= St. Louis Jain temple =

Structure constructed for the 1904 St. Louis World's fair

1904 St. Louis Jain Temple
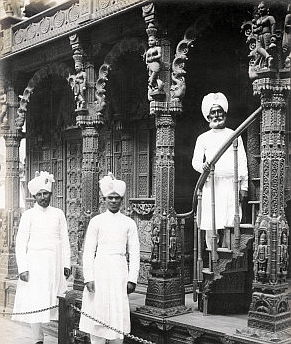
- Teak Jain temple in the India pavilion at the 1904 World's Fair

- Location within USA

Religion
- Affiliation: Jainism
- Governing body: Jain Center Of Southern California

Location
- Location: St. Louis, Missouri, United States
- Interactive map of 1904 St. Louis Jain Temple

Architecture
- Completed: 1904
- Temple: 1

Website
- www.jaincenter.net

The 1904 St. Louis Jain temple is a historic wooden structure that was constructed for the 1904 St. Louis World's fairs, termed "Louisiana Purchase Exposition". It was the first building in the United States designated as a Jain temple, since it intended to be a replica of a Jain temple in India, although there were no Jains in the United States at that time. It later stood in Las Vegas where some members of the Los Angeles Jain community discovered it in 1980. It now stands within the Jain Center of Southern California in Los Angeles.

== Louisiana Purchase Exposition ==
At the Louisiana Purchase Exposition it stood within the India pavilion. It was described thus:

"The pavilion, a reproduction of the famous mosque of Itmad-ul-Dowlah at Agra, India, was much admired, as were the interior decorations and exhibits. Rising from the center of the court was a Jain temple of teakwood .., being a copy of a white marble temple eight times as large at Palitana, Central India. The reproduction represented two years' work of sixty-five artists and was made expressly for the Louisiana Purchase Exposition.”

After the exposition, the temple was dismantled, but was not shipped back to India as originally planned. Note that Palitana is in the modern Gujarat state.

== Las Vegas ==
Hotelier Ben Jaffe, owner of the Castaways, acquired the temple and had it shipped to Las Vegas where it was reassembled by the hotel's pool for its opening on September 1, 1963. It was given the name Gateway to Luck. The image of the temple was widely used in the hotel's postcards and some of the casino token. The site is now occupied by The Mirage.

== In Southern California ==
The Jain Center of Southern California was established in 1979, with Mahendra Khandar as the President. In 1980, Lalit Shah and Shirish Seth visited Las Vegas and discovered the temple. In 1981, some of the Jains accompanied by Acharya Sushil Kumar and Chitrabhanu saw the temple, and agreed that the temple should belong to a Jain organization. Lalit Shah, then vice-president of the Jain Center of Southern California approached the Castaways manager Bill Friedman. He offered to have the value of the Temple appraised and sell it to them. The Jains instead requested the estate of Howard Hughes to donate it to them. In 1987, Castaways was bought by Steve Wynn. Castaways was demolished to make place for the new 3,044-room megaresort Mirage. The Temple was boxed up again and was acquired by the Jain Center of Southern California through the efforts of Dr. Manibhai Mehta, a former president. In 1995, the 1600 parts were transported to Buena Park.

In 2004, the Southern California Jain Center initiated reconstruction of the 42,000 square feet center. The wood temple has been carefully restored with the assistance of Manubhai Shah and MS International who carefully studied how the temple would be put together again. The coating put on it at Las Vegas was removed to restore the original teak look. The structure is 15 ft x 20 ft x 35 ft high and weighs nearly 10,000 lbs. It now forms the centerpiece of the center. In 2008 the new building was inaugurated.

== Artistic significance ==
The 1904 St. Louis temple is not only one of a kind in USA, but is a rare surviving example of Indian tradition of wooden architecture. It has been suggested that it was originally carved at the Ahmadabad Woodcarving Company jointly run by Muggenbhai Hutheesing of Ahmedabad and Lockwood de Forest, a painter, orientalist and interior architect of New York City.

== See also ==
- Jainism in America
- JAINA
- Jain Center of Southern California
- Brampton Jain Temple
