= Jain Center of Southern California =

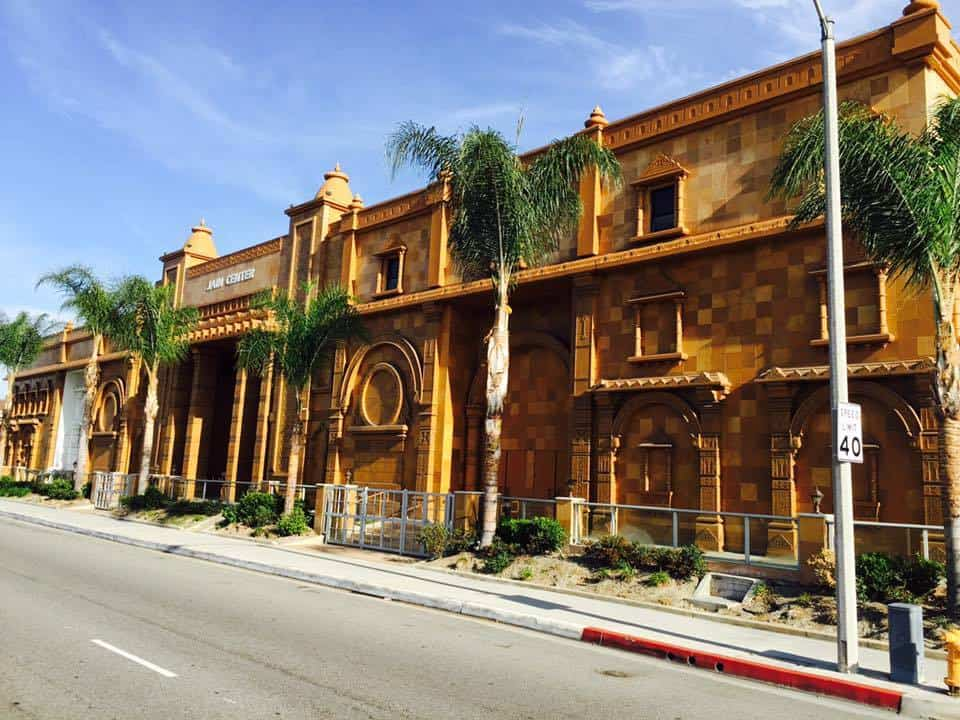
- Jain Center of Southern California in LA

Religion
- Affiliation: Jainism
- Governing body: Jain Center Of Southern California

Location
- Location: Buena Park, California, United States
- State: California

Architecture
- Established: 1979
- Temple: 1

Website
- www.jaincenter.org

Jain Center of Southern California (JCSC) is a leading Jain Center in America. It was founded on September 15, 1979. JCSC played a major role in founding of JAINA, the umbrella Jain organization of North America and hosted the first Jaina convention in 1981.

The temple is both non-regional and non-sectarian and thus includes Jains of all sects speaking various languages, as a result of conscious decisions made during the founding.

== Overview ==
The new facility includes a religious complex and a cultural complex and an educational complex. All these has been built at a total cost of about $20 million made possible by donations of the members.

The building houses the historic 1904 wooden Jain Temple structure carefully restored to its full glory. Initially constructed for the 1904 St. Louis World's Fair, it stood in Las Vegas for many years before being reassembled in 2008.

== History ==
In 1971, Chitrabhanu, Jain scholar and organizer, visited Los Angeles and assisted in a pratikramana hosted by Lalit Shah. Assisted by Mahendra Khandhar, he and other Jains conceived the idea of organizing a Jain institution locally and at the national level. In late 1970, dozens of Jains from cities around the Southland would come to a tiny house in Cerritos for prayer hosted by Manibhai Mehta. In 1979, 150 families participated in the founding of JCSC. It grew to about 700 families in 1996.

Initially the JCSC members met in various community halls. In 1988, the first temple termed Jain Bhavan, was constructed with a cost of 1988.

Today, the local Jain community has thousands of members, a massive new temple. Some members live near Buena Park, but others come from as far away as Bakersfield.

== Inclusive character of JCSC ==
At the founding, it was felt that the organization should be more than just a Jain shrine, and it should serve all of Southern California, not just Los Angeles. Thus, the name "Jain Center of Southern California" was selected.

Although the majority of the members were Gujarati, after some discussion it was decided that the institution would serve all Jains. While formal documents would use English, lectures could be in English, Gujarati or Hindi. Although majority of the Jains belonged to the Murtipujak Shvetambara tradition, it was decided that the sectarian differences prevailing in India should not be imported. While a family should use its own sectarian tradition at home, its use in organizational affairs would be divisive. A reasonable balance will be kept in to respect all the sects. While the majority would prevail, the minority would be heard, respected and accommodated.

== Jain Pathshala (Jain center Youth Council) ==
In 1981, a winter youth camp was organized in San Luis Obispo. Its success led to the formation of Jain center Youth Council as an auxiliary of JCSC. Initially it had 20 children and three teachers. For several years the classes were held at various residences, until the construction of Jain Bhavan in 1988, when the attendance had increased to about 70. By 2009, it had further increased to about 400 with 29 classes and 86 teachers. All the classes have been taught by volunteers.

== Jain Social Group ==
The Jain Social Groups (JSC) of Los Angeles is a cultural group that is informally associated with JCSC. Founded in 1984, it contributes to charities, the community as well as the JainCenter.

== Location ==
The temple is located in Buena Park, California

== See also ==
- Jainism in America
- Brampton Jain Temple
- St. Louis Jain temple
- Federation of Jain Associations in North America
- Siddhayatan
