= Jain Center of America =

First Jain temple organized and registered in America, in 1976

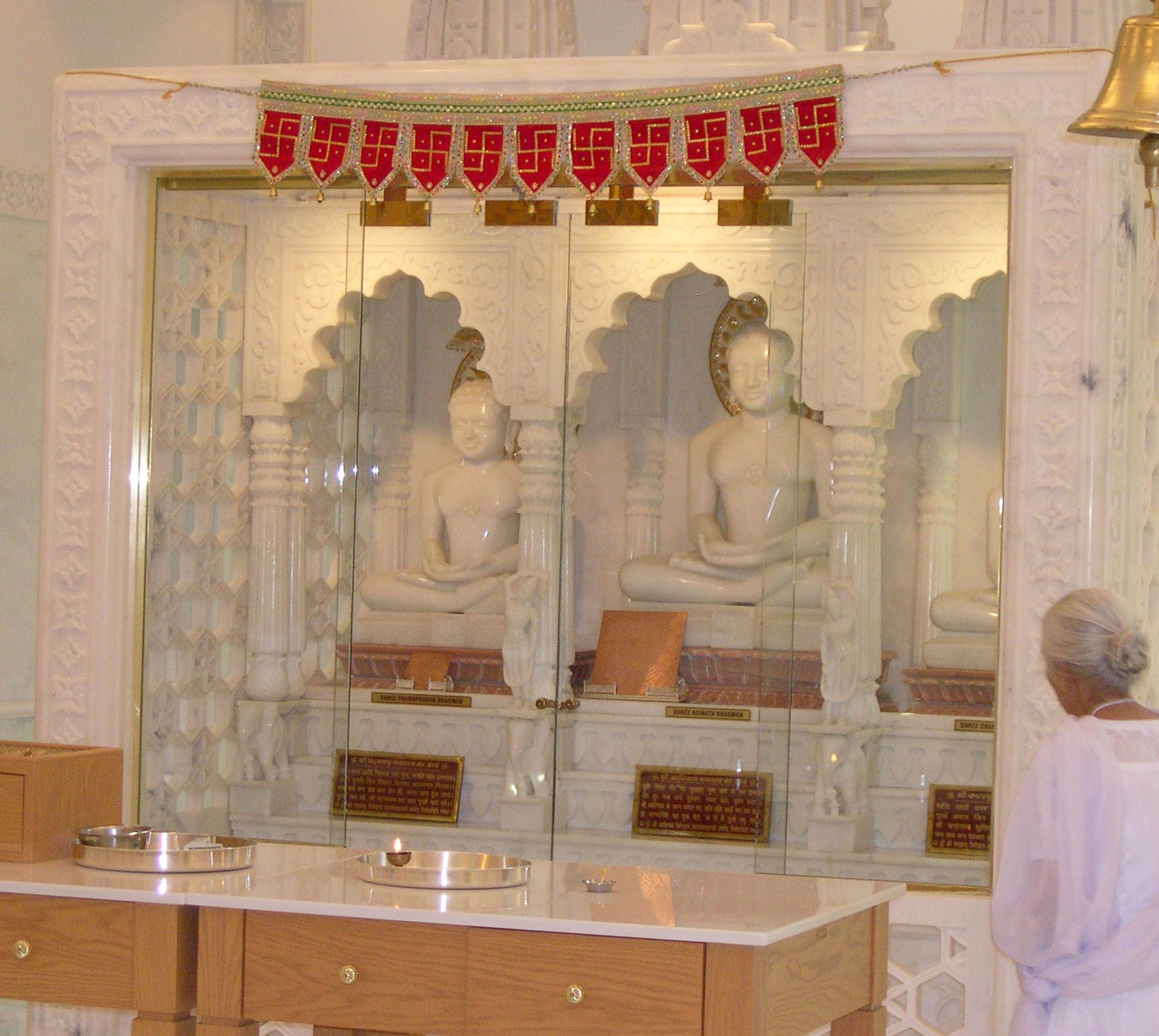
- The Jain Center of America, in Elmhurst, Queens, New York City

- Location within New York State Jain Center of America (New York) Jain Center of America (the United States)

Religion
- Affiliation: Jainism
- Governing body: Jain Center of America, Inc. New York

Location
- Location: 43-11 Ithaca Street; Elmhurst, Queens, New York City; U.S.
- Coordinates: 40°44′36.9″N 73°52′35.5″W

Architecture
- Established: 1973, 2005
- Temple: 1

Website
- www.nyjaincenter.org

The Jain Center of America (JCA) was the first Jain temple organized and registered in America, in 1976, and is the oldest Jain temple in the Western Hemisphere. The temple is located at 43-11 Ithaca Street, in Elmhurst, Queens, New York City. The temple houses shrines for Mahavira in the Śvētāmbara tradition, Rishabhanatha in the Digambar tradition, Upashraya in the Sthanakvasi tradition (who do not have pratimas) and a meditation hall for the Shrimad Rajchandra tradition.

JCA is a 16,625 square feet (1,544.5 m^{2}), with four stories and a cellar. The temple can accommodate over 500 people at one time. The most distinctive and unique feature of the JCA Temple is the manner in which it has managed to unite different sectarian traditions of the Jain faith under one roof, with each tradition having its own worshipping space, to preserve their unique tradition and identity and at the same time foster greater harmony and unity among all its members.

== History ==
The plans for a Jain temple, the very first in the western hemisphere, were announced in 1973 by Prof. Narendra Sethi, a professor of Management at St. John's University, then the president of the Jain Center of New York, at a Diwali celebration, where Gurudev Chitrabhanu was the main speaker. This was the year of 2500th Nirvana anniversary of Lord Mahavira; the temple's projected cost was to be $250,000.

The Jain Center of America - New York (JCA) was the first Jain Center registered in USA in 1976. In its early years, the JCA NY Center had no place to worship. In 1981, the center acquired its first temple building in the borough of Queens, New York. In June 2005, the JCA NY celebrated its Pratishta Mahotsav in the newly constructed temple at 43-11 Ithaca St, Elmhurst, Queens, NY, replacing the original 1981 structure.

The first western Jain sadhvi (nun) Nisha Kapashi, used to attend the lectures here. She took diksha in 2015 and is now known as Sadhvi Sanveg Prajna. Once fond of fashionable clothes and shoes, now she wears white and walks barefoot.

In November 2024, the Center celebrated the 50th anniversary of Bhagwan Mahaveer Swami’s pratima (statue) arriving in New York City.

== Gallery ==
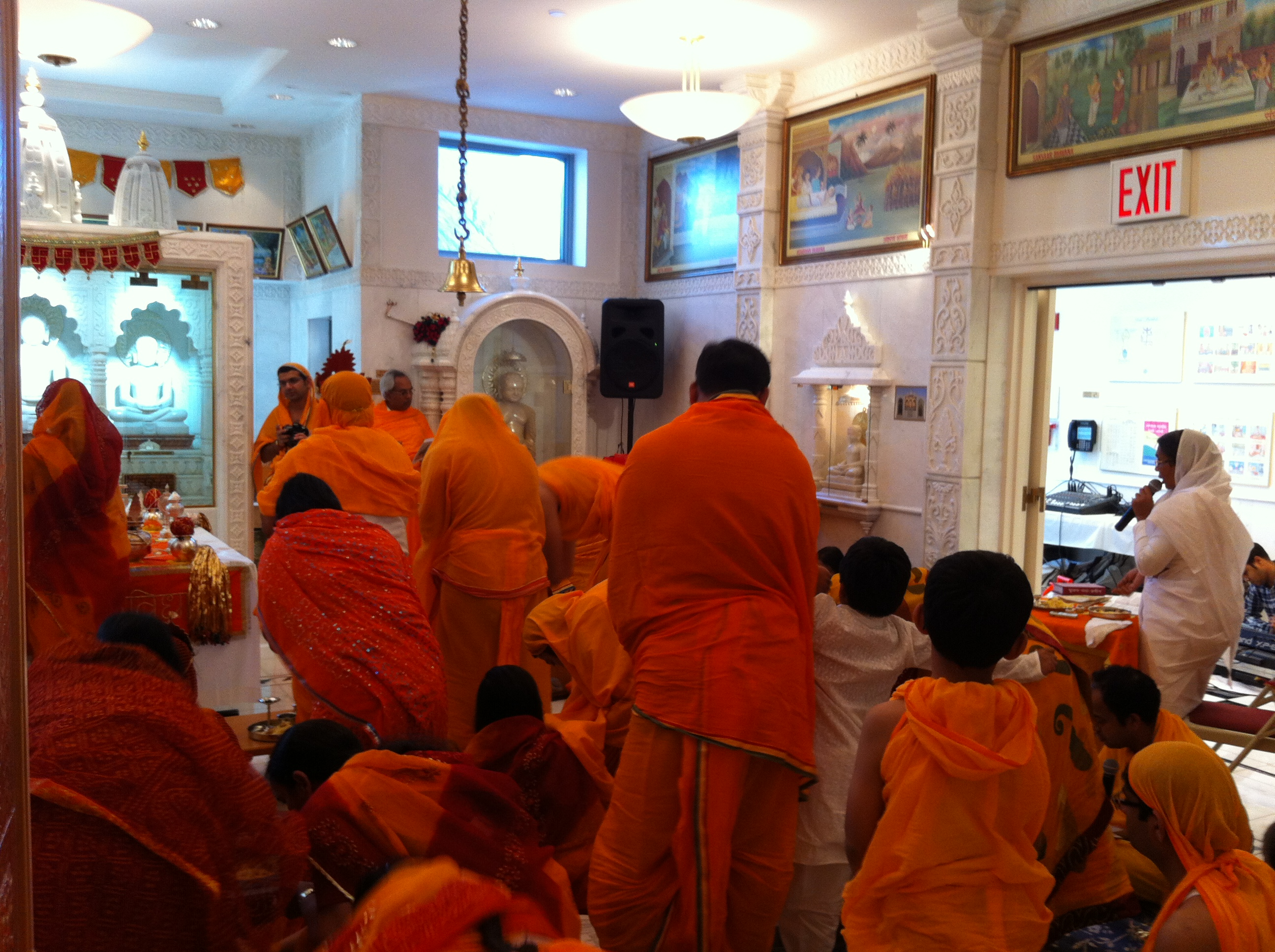
Das Lakshana (Paryushana) celebrations, Jain Center of America, New York City.

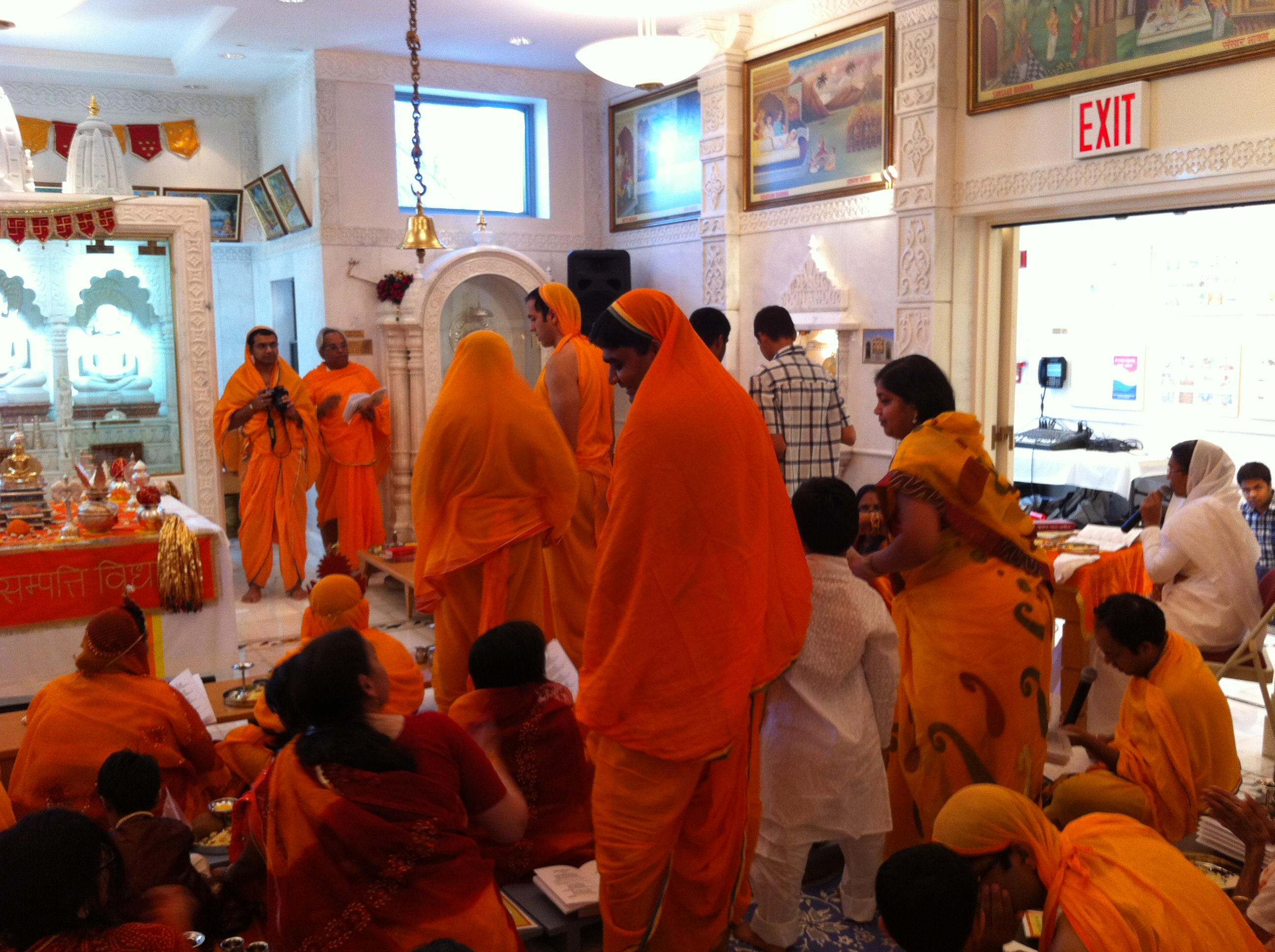
Das Lakshana (Paryushana) celebrations, Jain Center of America, New York City.

== See also ==
- Jainism in America
- Jain Center of Southern California
- JAINA
- Brampton Jain Temple
- Chitrabhanu
