= Jain house temple =

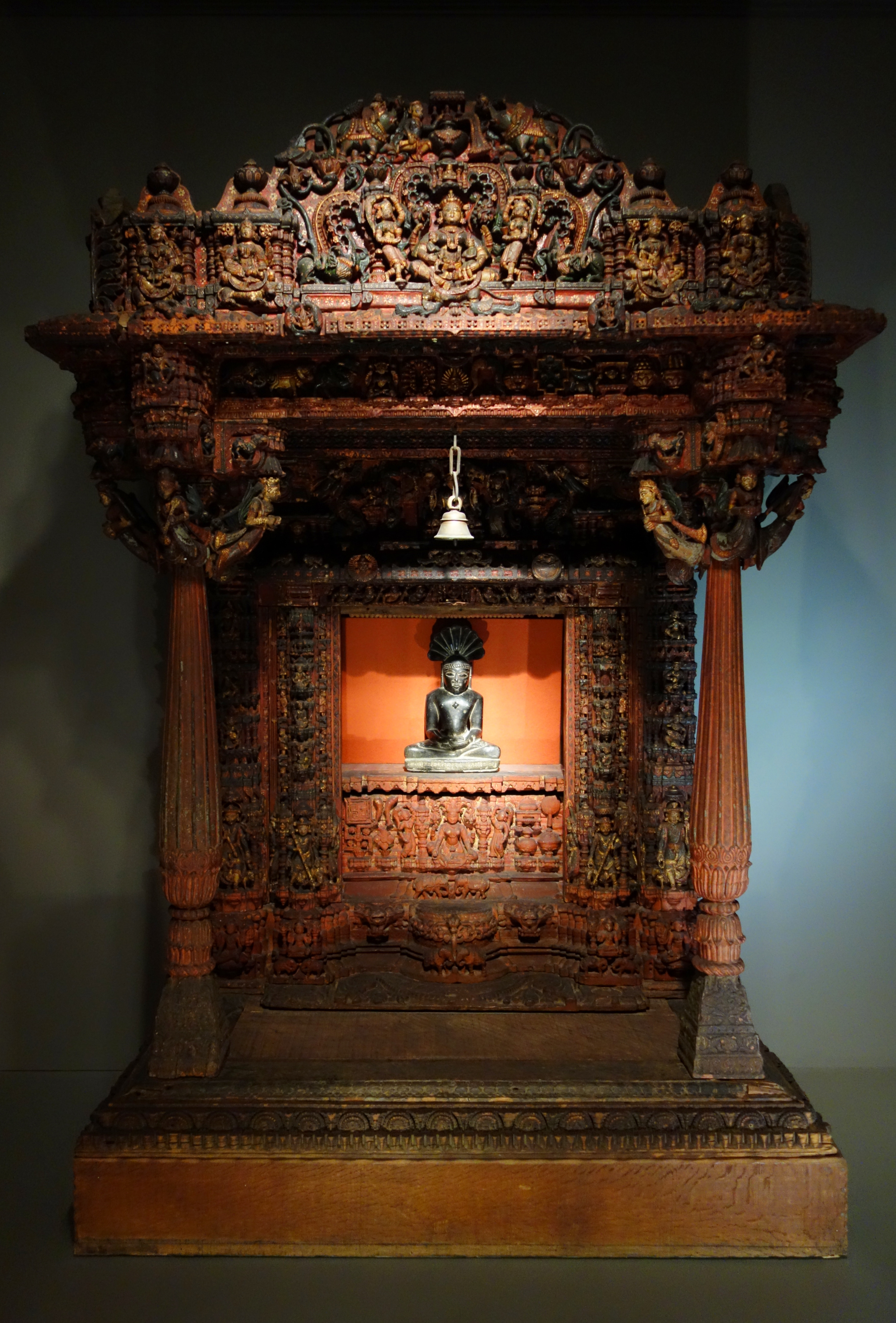
From Patan, Gujarat, India, early 17th century Cincinnati Art Museum, Cincinnati

A house temple (Ghar Derasar or Griha Chaityalaya) is a private Jain shrine that is placed within a personal residence. Sometimes it is separate room or structure in a compound.

Jain scholars prescribe that the height of a pratima in a house shrine should not exceed 11 aṅgulas, i.e. about 21 cm.

The formal communal temple is often referred to as a shikharbandi Jinalaya, i.e. with a shikhara. Sometimes a temple starts as a house temple, which grows into a formal shikharbandi Jinalaya when the community grows to be sufficiently large.

Jain author Haribhadra Suri states in one of his famous granthas, Sambodh Prakran that if a lay person has savings more than 100 rupees, then there must be a Ghar derasar at his/her home. Further he says that the house which does not have a Ghar derasar is not a home, it is a graveyard.

In that derasar, an image of a Tirthankara must be installed, on which the rituals of anjanashalaka (Panch Kalyanaka Pratishtha Mahotsava) must be done.

== See also ==
- Butsudan
