= Brampton Jain Temple =

- Bhagwan 1008 Adinatha Swamy Jain Temple
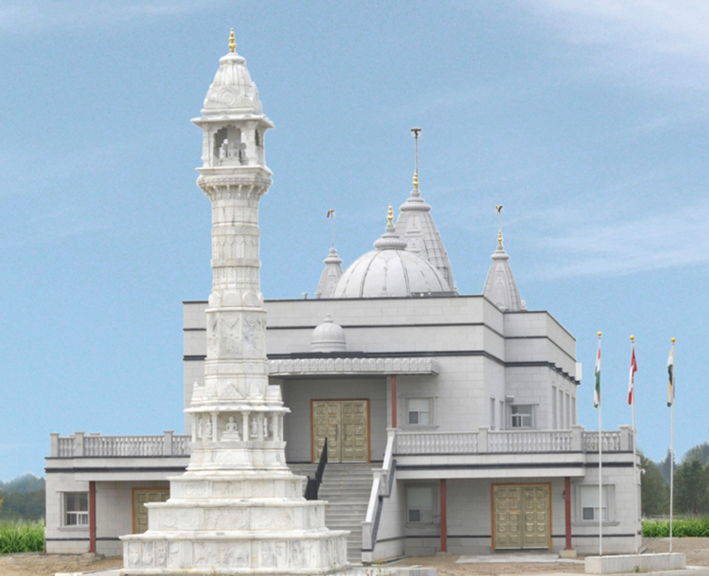
- Brampton Jain Temple in Brampton, Ontario

- Location within Canada

Religion
- Affiliation: Jainism
- Deity: Rishabhanatha
- Governing body: Gyan Jain, Shri SS Jain Sangh

Location
- Location: Brampton, Ontario, Canada
- Interactive map of Brampton Jain Temple
- Coordinates: 43°49′40.729″N 79°43′4.51″W

Architecture
- Established: 2011
- Temple: 1

Website
- jaintemplecanada.com

Brampton Jain Temple or the Bhagwan 1008 Adinatha Swamy Jain Temple, is the first Jain temple in Canada constructed using traditional Indian architecture. The temple is located at 7875 Mayfield Road in Brampton, ON Canada, L7E 0W1. The temple houses shrines for Rishabhanatha (also called Adinātha).

The Greater Toronto Area has the largest concentration of the followers of Jainism in Canada and has the highest number of Jain temples of all Canadian urban areas.

== History ==
There are about 10,000 Jains in Canada, mostly concentrated in one province. Two-thirds of the Jain community is concentrated in the metropolitan Toronto area. In 2011, the temple construction was overseen by Bhattarak Charukeerthi, Moodabidri from India. Many people brought their own bricks to lay for the foundation of the temple.

The temple celebrated its Pratishta Mahotsav in 2014. In 2015, 2000 people visited the temple for its anniversary celebrations, which were marked by religious discourses. MPP Dipika Damerla was present on the occasion to present Premier Kathleen Wynne's wishes to the Jain community.

== Architecture ==
The Jain temple is the first one in Canada to use traditional Indian architecture. The temple also has a Manastambh, the second Jain temple in North America to have one. A Manastambh, or Pride Pillar, indicates a loss of pride for the worshipper before entering the temple.

== See also ==
- BAPS Shri Swaminarayan Mandir Toronto
- Toronto Ontario Temple
- Toronto Zen Centre
- Hare Krishna Temple (Toronto)
- JAINA
- Jain Center of America
