= Chitrabhanu =

Leader and prominent figure in American Jainism

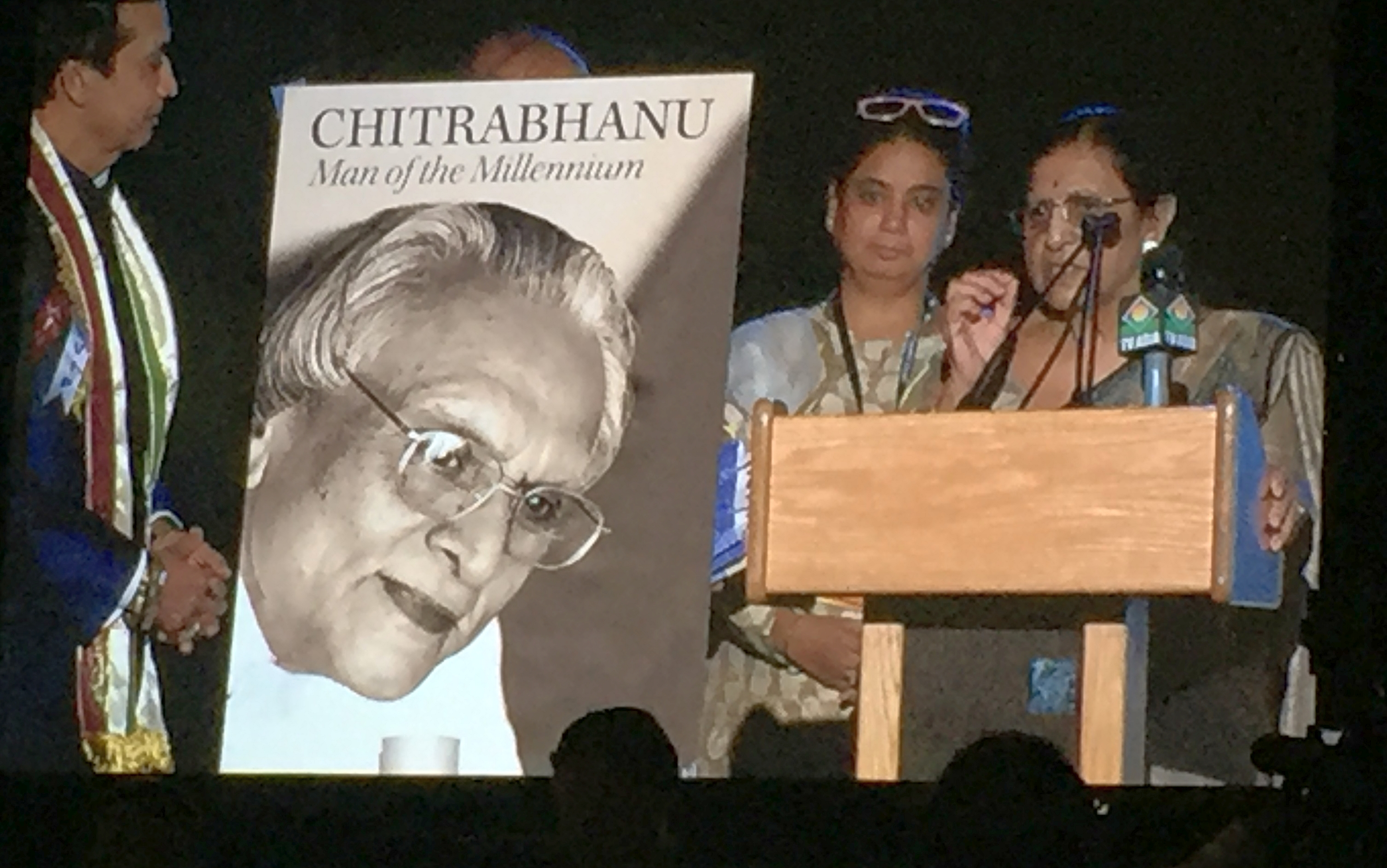
- Book Release on Chitrabhanu, JAINA 2017 at Edison NJ
- Born: Rup–Rajendra Shah; July 26, 1922; Rajasthan, India
- Died: April 19, 2019 (aged 96); Mumbai, India
- Other name: monk as Chandraprabha Sagar
- Education: Degree in Psychology
- Alma mater: college at Bangalore
- Occupations: Jain Spiritual leader, Jain philosopher, author
- Organization(s): Jain Meditation International Center in Manhattan, New York City
- Known for: First Jain Spiritual Leader travelled to US
- Notable work: Gujarati composition "Maitri Bhavanu Pavitra Jharanu", The Jain Path to Freedom
- Website: www.jainmeditation.org /www.chitrabhanuji.com

Gurudev Shree Chitrabhanu (July 26, 1922 – April 19, 2019) was a prominent figure in American Jainism. He was one of the co-founders of JAINA.

== Personal life ==
He was born as Rup-Rajendra Shah to parents Chhogala and Chunibai on July 26, 1922, in a small town Takhatgarh in Pali district of Rajasthan, India. His father had a cloth business in Tumkur, Mysore where Rup-Rajendra and his sister Magi were raised. When he was four years old his mother suddenly died and when he was 11 years old, his sister Magi died due to smallpox.

He studied psychology at Bangalore. He found Acharya Sagaranandsuri of Tapa Gaccha a sub sect of Śvetāmbara sect of Jainism as his Guru. He became a Jain monk on February 6, 1942, at the age of 20 at Palitana and was named Muni Chandraprabha Sagar for 29 years.

In 1970 he was invited to attend The Second Spiritual Summit Conference to be held in April in Geneva, Switzerland. Jain monks are traditionally not permitted to travel overseas. He gave up monkhood in 1970 to attend the Summit, and became an ordinary shravaka. He also married Pramoda Shah in 1971. He has two sons, Rajeev Chitrabhanu and Darshan Chitrabhanu.

He died in his Mumbai residence surrounded by family members on April 19, 2019.

== In Europe ==
After attending the conference in Geneva, Chitrabhanu travelled to France and the UK.

== In USA ==
After spending some time in Africa and Europe, he came to the US in 1971 to attend the Third Spiritual Summit at the Harvard Divinity School. His speech at the Third Spiritual Summit received good recognition and was dubbed as "Hit Speaker of the Day" by a local Boston newspaper. This resulted in many invitations across the east coast including churches, universities, and seminars.

In 1973, he founded the Jain Meditation International Center in Manhattan, New York City. A small marble statue Shri Mahavir Swami was installed and this became the first Jain place of worship in the US. He claimed to attain enlightenment in 1981 by the ocean at San Diego. In 1975 he met Jain Muni Sushil Kumarji to USA, the first practicing Jain monk on his visit to USA. Since being in the USA he has inspired the growth of 70 Jain centers in US and Canada.

He was among the early promoters of Yoga in USA. His disciple Beryl Bender Birch developed her own style of yoga.

== Establishment of JAINA ==
With his guidance, a federation of all Jain associations termed JAINA (Federation of Jain Associations in North America), was founded which became the umbrella organization with more than 100,000 members. For his unprecedented journey to bring the Jain tradition of ahimsa to the Western Hemisphere, Chitrabhanu received the Peace Abbey Courage of Conscience Award.

== Vegetarianism ==
Chitrabhanu argued that Jainism is more of an ethical philosophy than a religion and that Jains do not eat meat or eggs as they have reverence for life. His wife Pramoda cooked all of his food and offered vegetarian cooking classes. Chitrabhanu consumed a lacto-vegetarian diet of fruit, legumes, vegetables, nuts, seeds and spices with dairy products. In his later life, Chitrabhanu authored articles supportive of veganism.

== Selected publications ==
He wrote twenty-five books which mainly deal with the topic of self-realization. Some of these are:

- Twelve Facets Of Reality:The Jain Path To Freedom (PDF). Dodd, Mead & Co. 1980. ISBN 9780396079026.
- Realize What You are: Dynamics of Jain Meditation. Jain Publishing Co, U.S. 1995. ISBN 9780875730363.
- Miller, Lyssa, ed. (1979). The Psychology of Enlightenment: Meditations on the Seven Energy Centers. Dodd, Mead & Co. ISBN 087573037X.
- Rosenfield, Clare, ed. (1979). The philosophy of soul and matter. Jain Meditation International Center.
- Ten Days Journey into the Self. Jain Meditation International Center. 1974.
- The Miracle is You. Jain Meditation International Center. 1980.
- Reflections. 2010.

== See also ==
- Jain Center of America
- Jainism in America
