= Jain temple =

Place of worship for Jains, the followers of Jainism

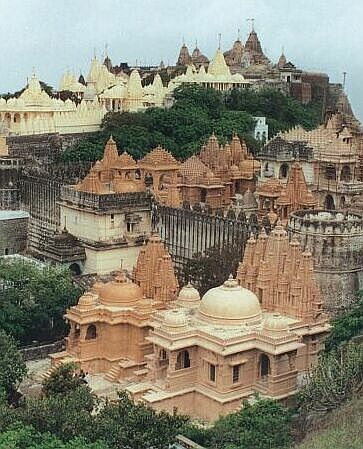
Palitana temples in Gujarat

A Jain temple, Derasar (Gujarati: દેરાસર) or Basadi (Kannada: ಬಸದಿ), is the place of worship for Jains, the followers of Jainism. Jain architecture is essentially restricted to temples and monasteries, and Jain buildings generally reflect the prevailing style of the place and time they were built.

Jain temple architecture is generally close to Hindu temple architecture, and in ancient times Buddhist architecture. Normally the same builders and carvers worked for all religions, and regional and periodic styles are generally similar. For over 1,000 years, the basic layout of a Hindu or most Jain temples has consisted of a small garbhagriha or sanctuary for the main murti or idol, over which the high superstructure rises, then one or more larger mandapa halls.

Māru-Gurjara architecture or the "Solanki style", is a particular temple style from Gujarat and Rajasthan (both regions with a strong Jain presence) that originated in both Hindu and Jain temples around the year 1000, but became enduringly popular with Jain patrons. It has remained in use, in somewhat modified form, to the present day, indeed also becoming popular again for some Hindu temples in the 20th century. The style is seen in the groups of pilgrimage temples at Dilwara on Mount Abu, Taranga, Girnar, Kundalpur, Sonagiri, Muktagiri and Palitana.

== Terms ==
There are many different terms used for Jain temples. Those originating from early scriptures, like the Agamas, were often ambiguous. In the early centuries CE, a single word might refer to cave temples, ascetics' dwellings, or religious schools, as their functions overlapped. It was only in later centuries, as buildings were constructed for specific purposes with unique designs, that a clearer and more accurate set of terms emerged. These terms helped differentiate the various structures and their distinct roles.

A temple is often referred to as chaitya, with its Prakrit form being cheia, which can also denote a religious idol. Another term is the Sanskrit balanaka (Prakrit balanaya), which seems to refer to only a part of the temple structure. In southern India, the word palli is widely used and can refer to a temple, a nun's residence, a cave, or even a school. Similarly, the term vihara, used for Jain temples, can also mean a monastery.

In contemporary usage, Jain temples in southern India — especially in Karnataka — are called basadi, basti, or similar terms. The historical use of basadi in North India is preserved in the names of the Vimala Vasahi and Luna Vasahi temples of Mount Abu. The Sanskrit word for vasahi is vasati, which implies an institution for residences of scholars attached to the shrine. In northern India, the names often combine jina with words meaning house, residence, or seat, resulting in terms like jinalaya, jina-mandir, jina-yatan, jinagruh, and jina-prasad. In Gujarat as well Rajasthan and in regions where Gujarati people have settled, Jain temples are typically known as derasar or dehrasar, which originate from the Sanskrit devagruha-vasara. Deri and dehra are its other variations.

Temples may be divided into Shikhar-baddha Jain temples, temple buildings dedicated to the public, normally with a high superstructure, (typically a north Indian shikhara tower above the shrine) and the Griha Chaityalaya (Ghar derasar), a private Jain house shrine. A Jain temple which is known as a pilgrimage centre is often termed as Tirtha.

The main idol of a Jain temple is known as the mula nayak. A Manastambha (column of honor) is a pillar that is often constructed in front of Jain temples. It has four 'Moortis' i.e. stone figures of the main god of that temple. One facing each direction: North, East, South and West.

== Architecture ==
Major pilgrimage and temple sites in Jainism

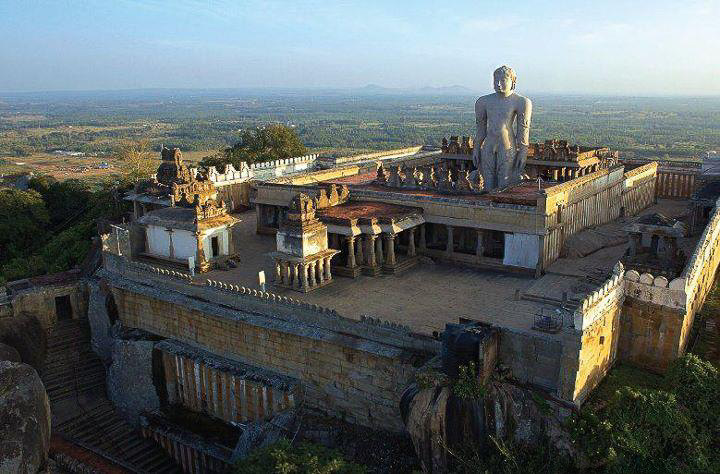
Jain Tirtha, Shravanabelagola, with the colossal Gommateshwara statue.

Jain temples are built with various architectural designs. Some of the earliest examples of Jain architecture are of the Indian rock-cut architecture tradition, whereby structures are produced by carving material out of solid rock. These traditions were initially shared with Buddhism, and by the end of the classical period, Hinduism. Jain temples and monasteries designed and constructed using rock-cut methods often share a site with those of the other religions, such as those at Udayagiri, Bava Pyara, Ellora, Aihole, Badami, Kalugumalai and Pataini temple. The Ellora Caves are a late site, which contains temples of all three religions, as the earlier Buddhist ones give way to later Hindu excavations.

Despite the similarity between different religions, Jainism is often known for placing large figures of one or more of the 24 tirthankaras in the open air rather than inside a shrine. These statues later began to increase in size, often in the form of standing nude figures in the kayotsarga meditation position (which is similar to standing at attention). The Gopachal rock cut Jain monuments, the Siddhachal Caves, and various single figures including the 12th-century Gommateshwara statue, the modern Statue of Vasupujya, and the Statue of Ahimsa, standing the tallest at 108 feet (33 meters) in height, all exemplify this similarity.

In recent times, the use of murti images has become controversial within Jainism, and some smaller sects reject them entirely, while others are selective in terms of which figures they allow images of. In sects which largely disapprove of images, the religious buildings are used instead.

Following the regional styles in Hindu temples, Jain temples in North India generally use the north Indian nagara style, while those in South India use the dravida style, although the north Indian Māru-Gurjara style or Solanki style has made some inroads in the south over the 20th century or so. For example, the Mel Sithamur Jain Math in Tamil Nadu has a large gopuram tower, similar to those of local Hindu temples.

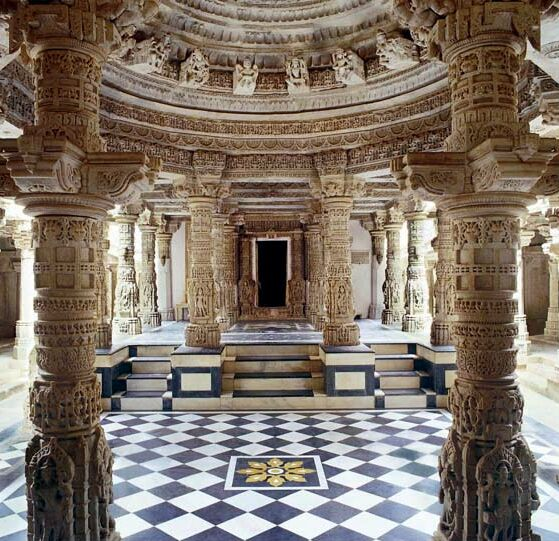
Temple interior, Dilwara

Characteristics of the original Māru-Gurjara style are "the external walls of the temples have been structured by increasing numbers of projections and recesses, accommodating sharply carved statues in niches. These are normally positioned in superimposed registers, above the lower bands of mouldings. The latter display continuous lines of horse riders, elephants, and kīrttimukhas. Hardly any segment of the surface is left unadorned." The main shikhara tower usually has many urushringa (subsidiary spirelets) on it, and two smaller side-entrances with porches are common in larger temples.

Later, with Dilwara in the lead, surrounding the main temple with a curtain of devakulikā shrines, each with a small spire, became a distinctive feature of the Jain temples of West India, still employed in some modern temples. These are fairly plain on the outer walls, and often raised on a very high platform, so that the outside of larger temples can resemble a fortress with high walls. However the entrance(s), often up high, wide steps, are not designed for actual defence, even though medieval Muslim armies and others destroyed many Jain temples in the past, often permanently.

Inside the temple, the Māru-Gurjara style features extremely lavish carving, especially on columns, large and intricately carved rosettes on the ceilings of mandapas, and a characteristic form of "flying arch" between columns, which has no structural role, and is purely decorative. Most early temples in the style are in various local shades of pink, buff or brown sandstone, but the Dilwara temples are in a very pure white marble which lightens the style and has become considered very desirable.

While, before British India, large Buddhist or Hindu temples (and indeed Muslim mosques) have very often been built with funds from a ruler, this was infrequently the case with Jain temples. Instead they were typically funded by wealthy Jain individuals or families. For this reason, and often the smaller numbers of Jains in the population, Jain temples tend to be at the small or middle end of the range of sizes, but at pilgrimage sites they may cluster in large groups - there are altogether several hundred at Palitana, tightly packed within several high-walled compounds called "tuks" or "tonks". Temple charitable trusts, such as the very large Anandji Kalyanji Trust, founded in the 17th century and now maintaining 1,200 temples, play a very important role in funding temple building and maintenance.

== Etiquette ==
There are some guidelines to follow when one is visiting a Jain temple:

- Before entering the temple, one should bathe and wear freshly washed clothes or some special puja (worship) clothes – while wearing these one must neither have eaten anything nor visited the washroom. However, drinking of water is permitted.
- One should not take any footwear (including socks) inside the temple. Leather items like a belt, purse etc. are not allowed inside the temple premises.
- One should not be chewing any edibles (food, gum, mints, etc.), and no edibles should be stuck in the mouth.
- One should try to keep as silent as possible inside the temple.
- Mobile phones should not be used in the temple. One should keep them switched off.

Prevailing traditional customs should be followed regarding worshipping at the temple and touching an idol. They can vary depending on the region and the specific sect.

== Gallery ==
=== India ===
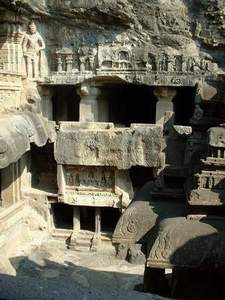
Ellora Jain cave basadi

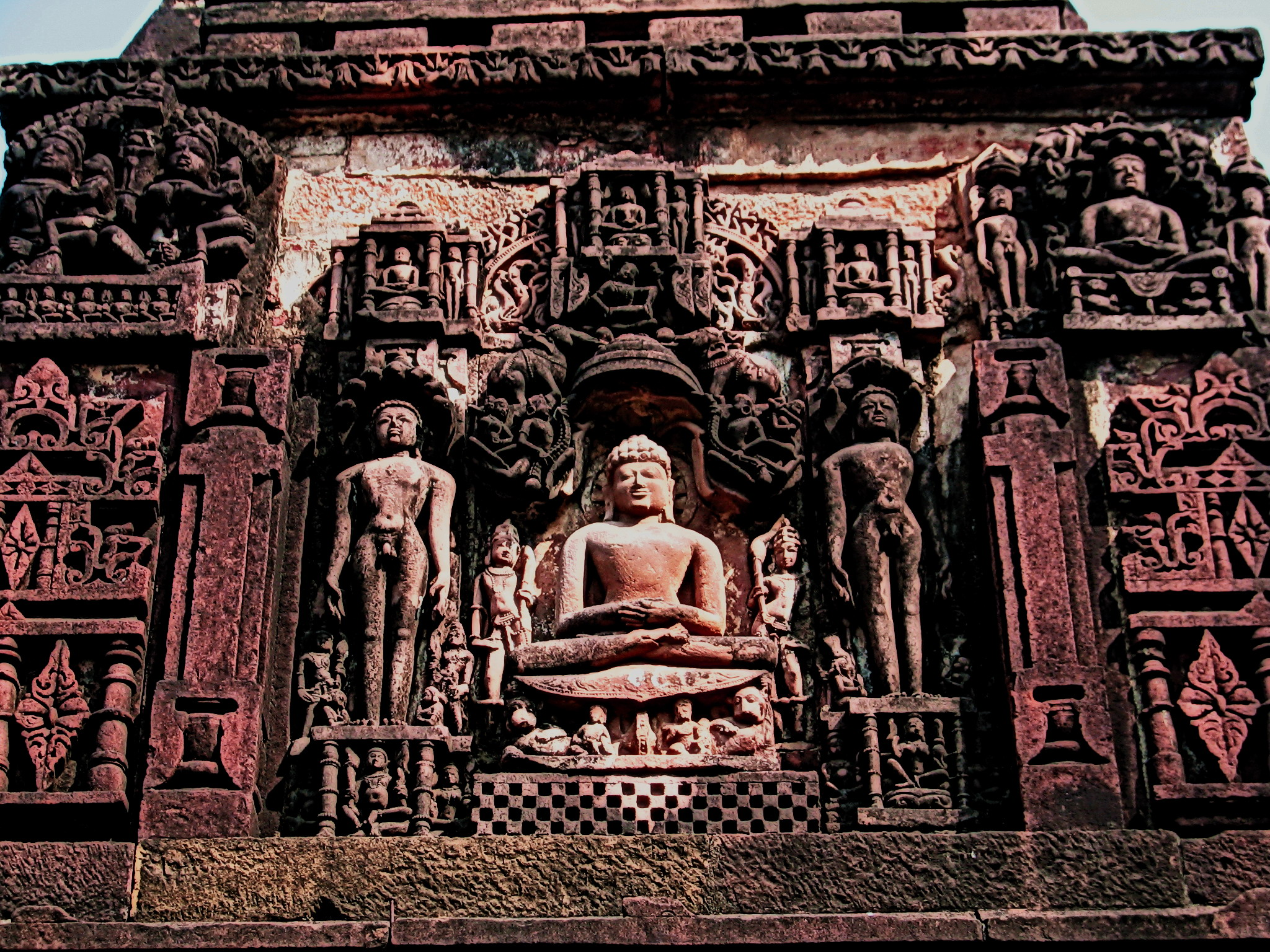
Jain Temple complex, Deogarh, Uttar Pradesh, before 862

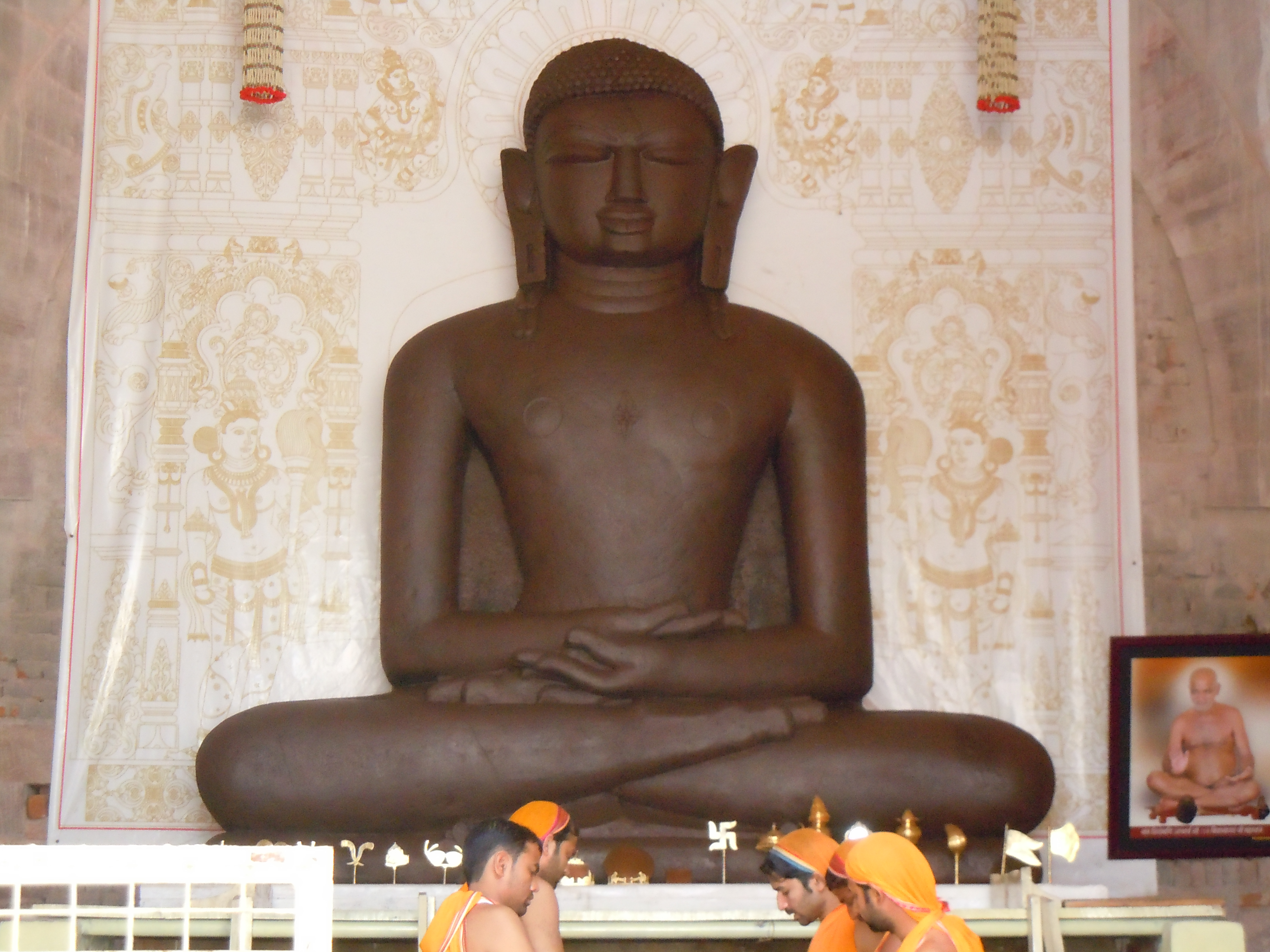
The "Bade Baba" idol inside Bade Baba Temple, Kundalpur, a representation of Rishabhanatha

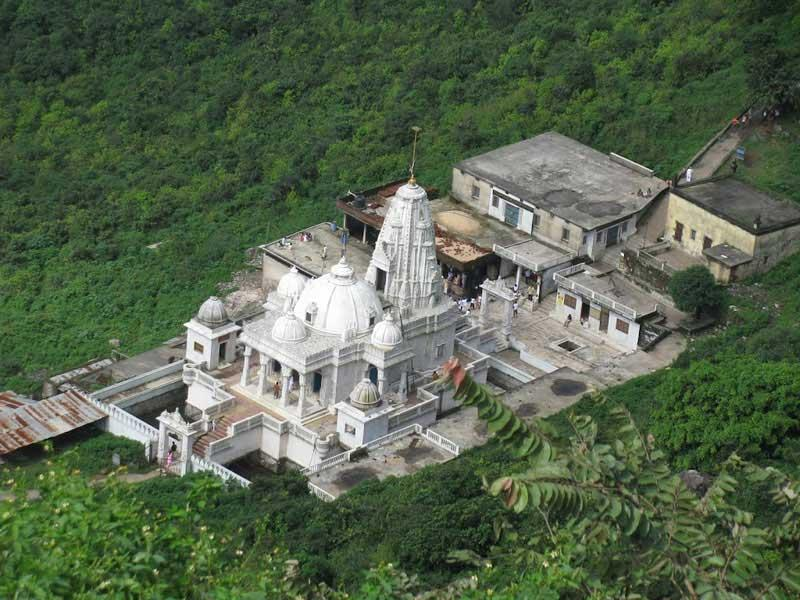
Jal Mandir, Shikharji

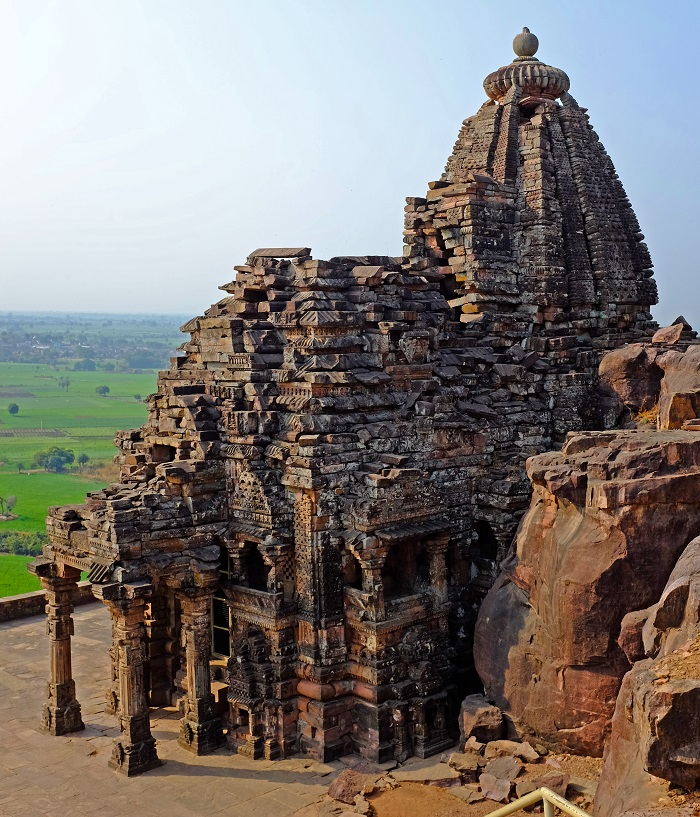
Maladevi temple, Vidisha

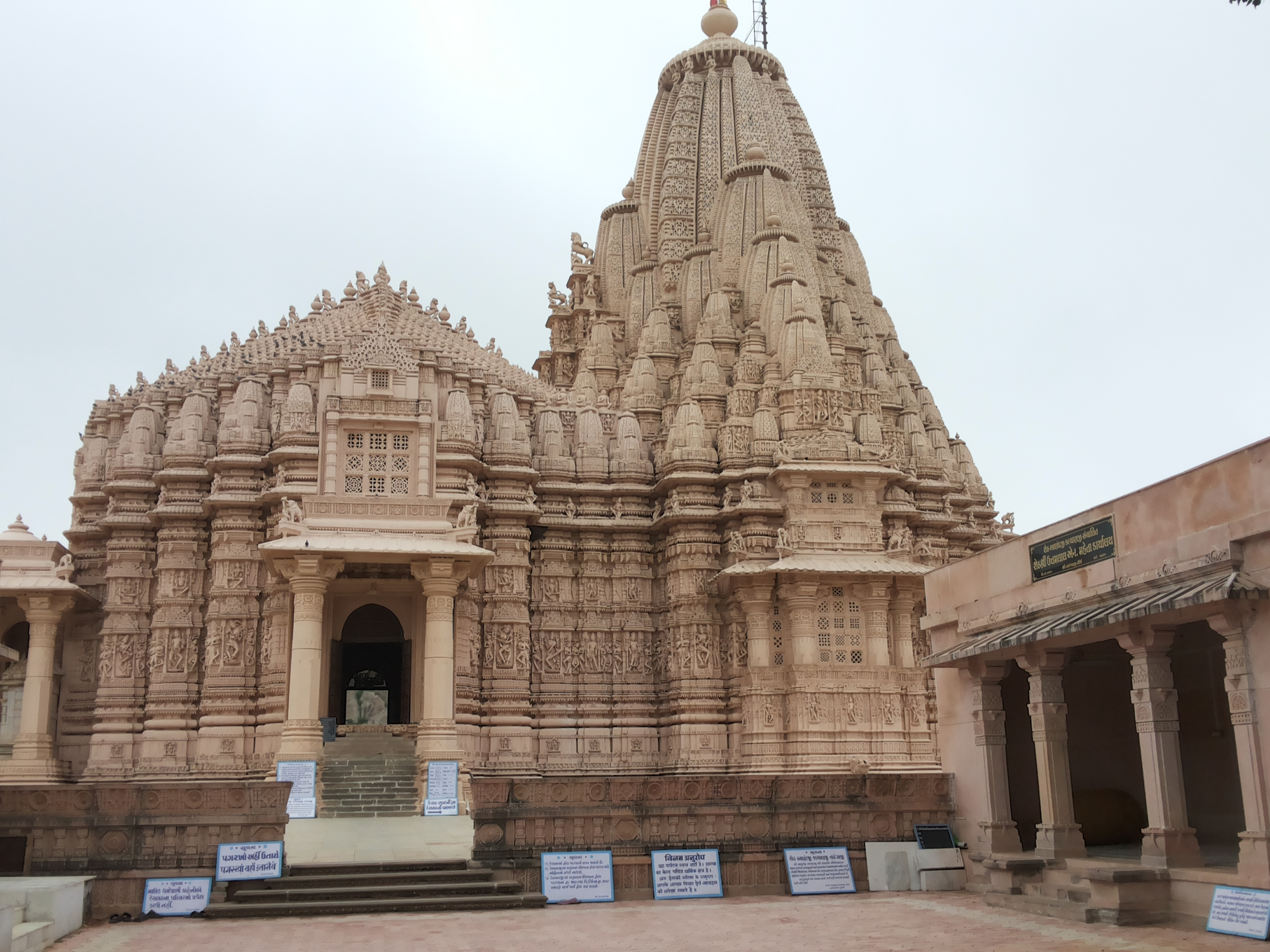
Taranga, Mehsana

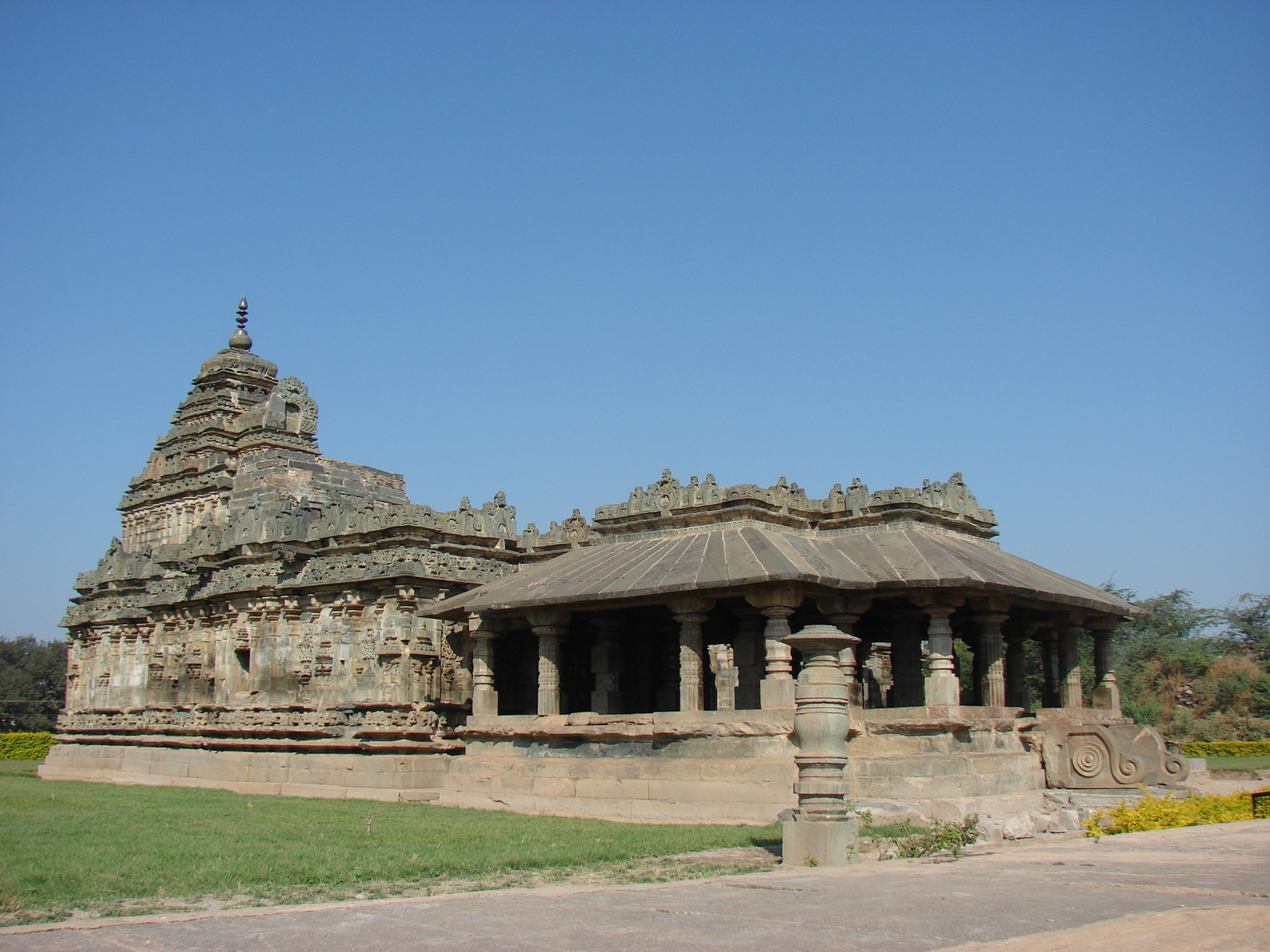
Brahma Jinalaya, Lakkundi, 11th century

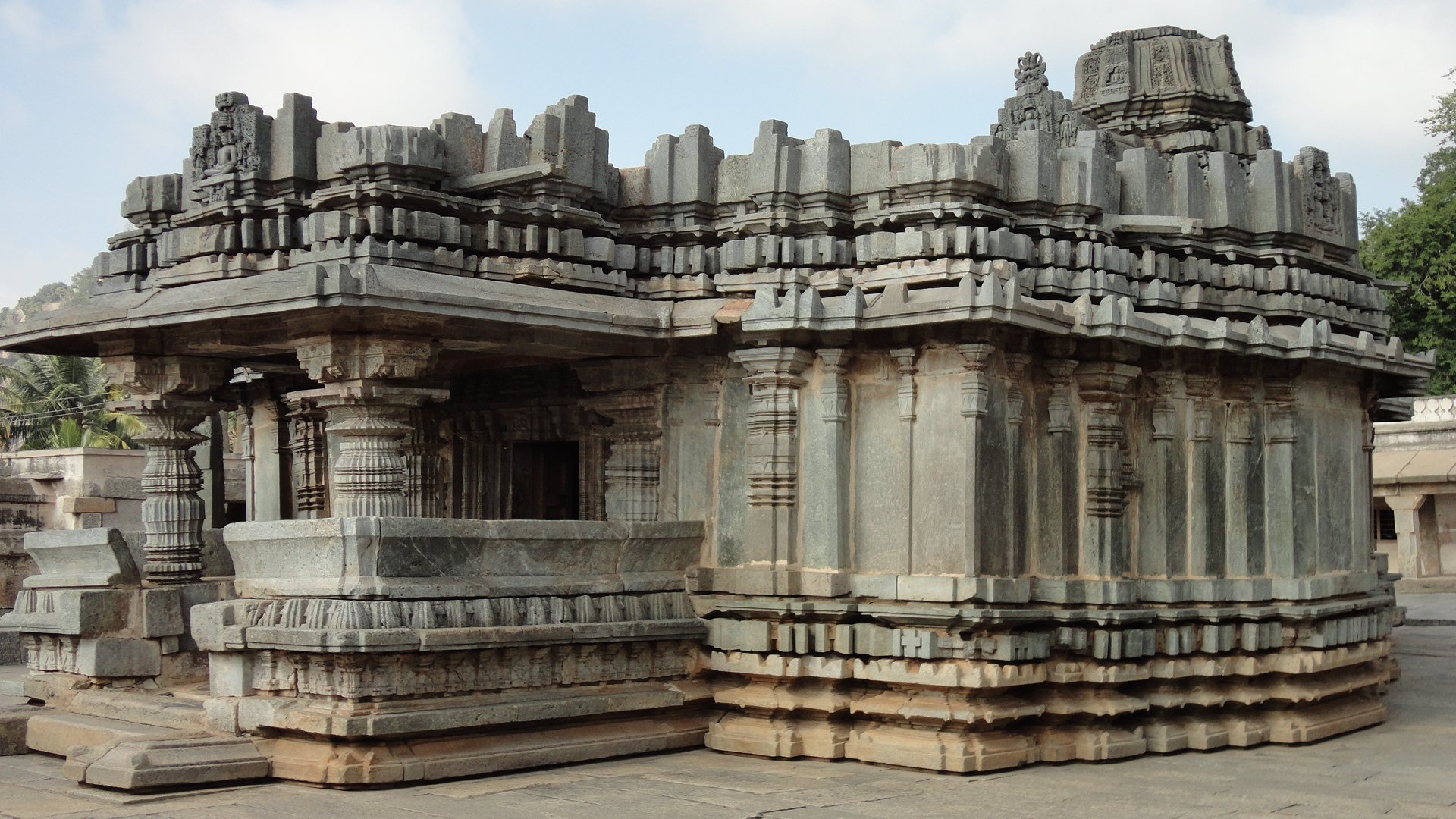
Akkana Basadi (1181) with lost superstructure.

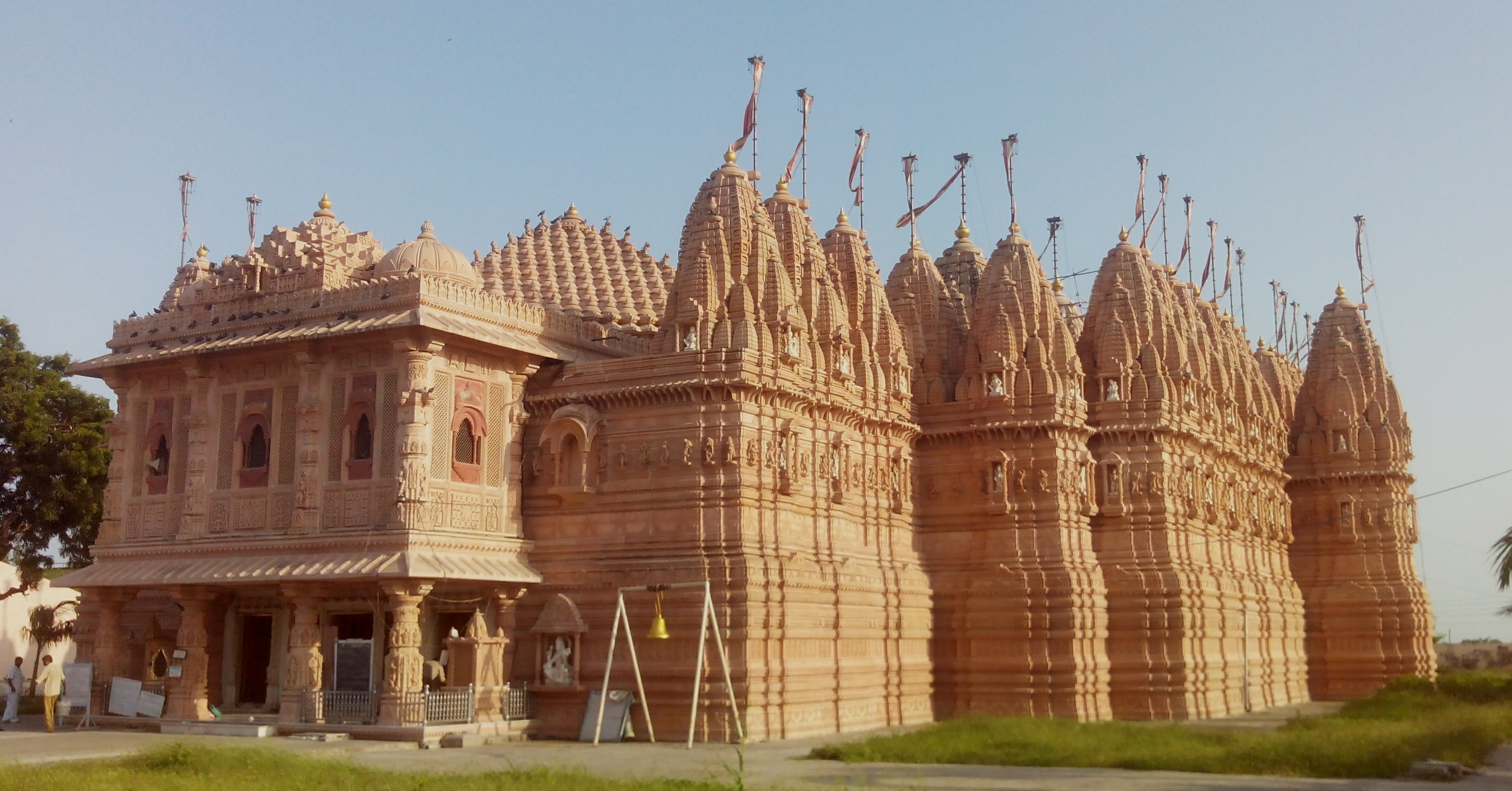
Vasai Jain Temple, Kutch, Gujarat

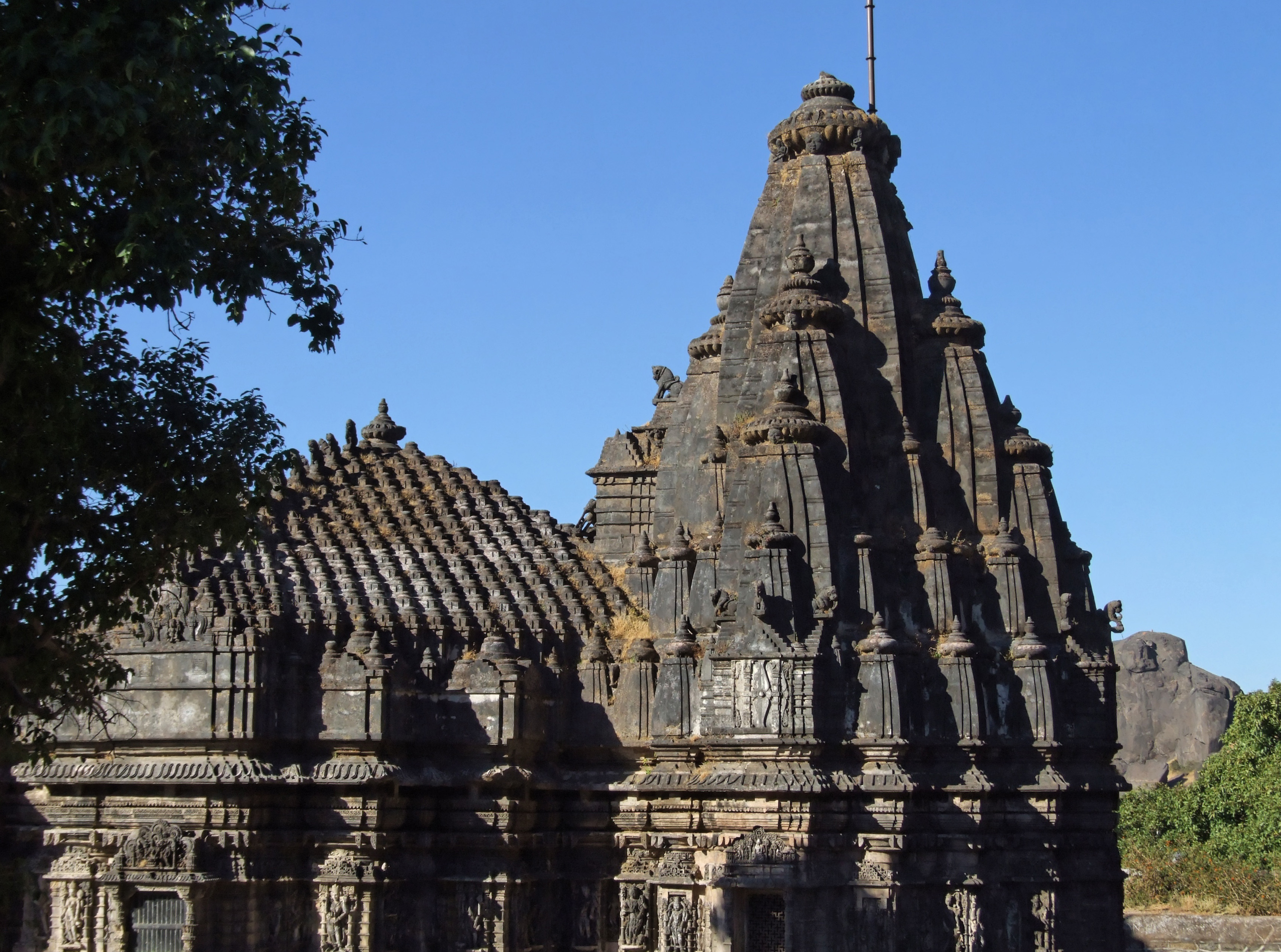
Girnar Jain temples

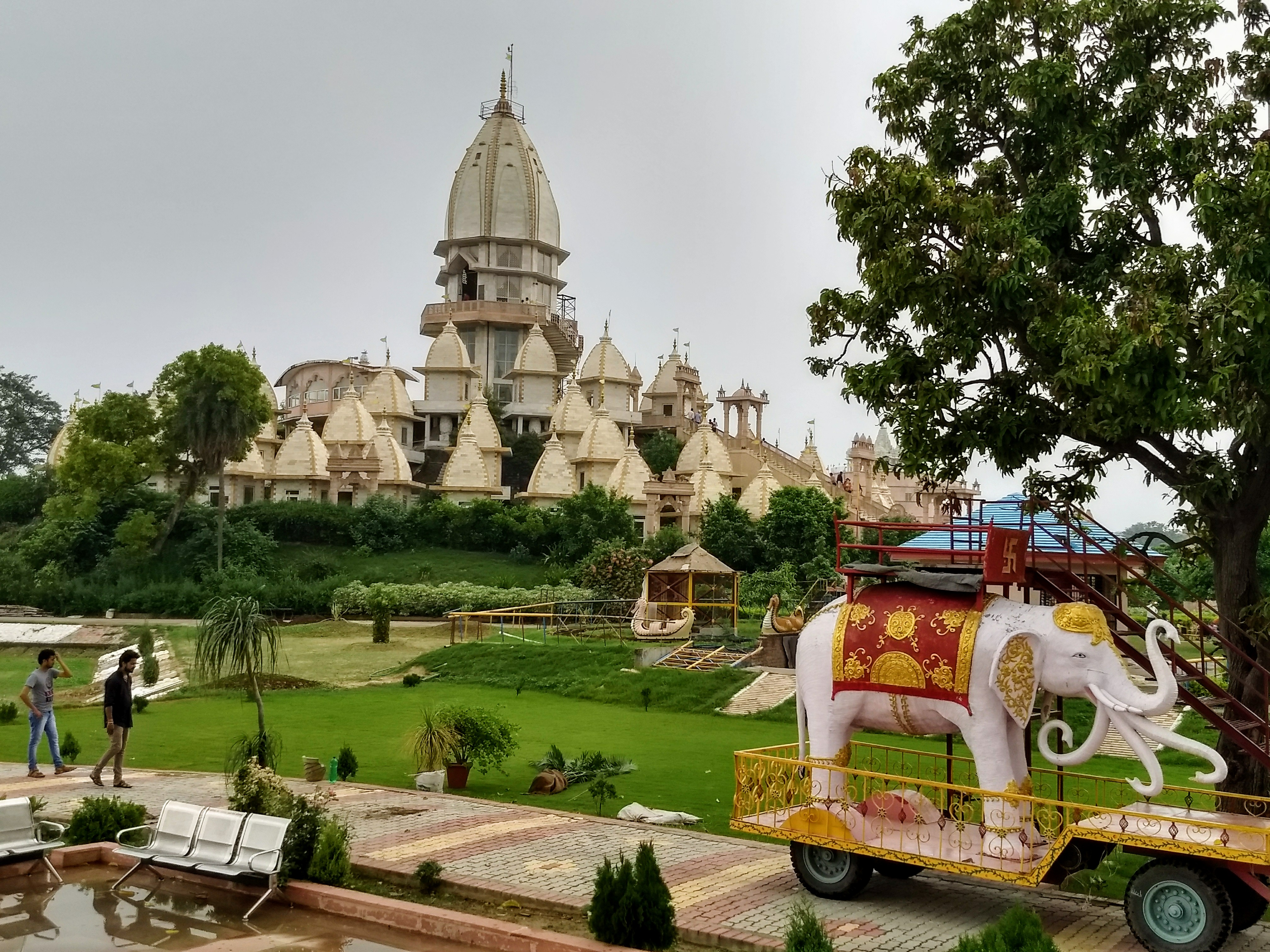
Kailash Parvat Rachna in Bada Mandir, Hastinapur

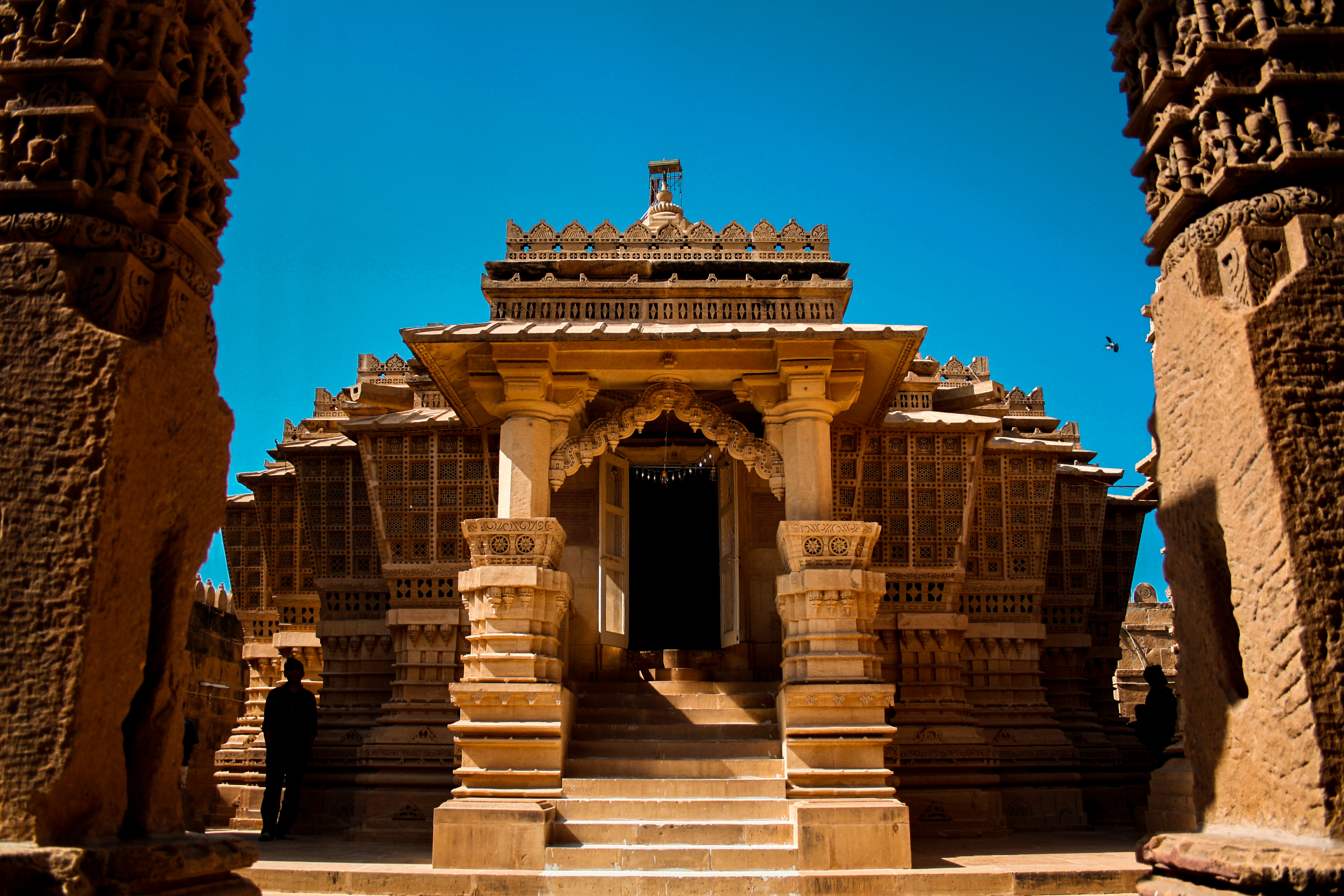
Lodhruva Jain temple

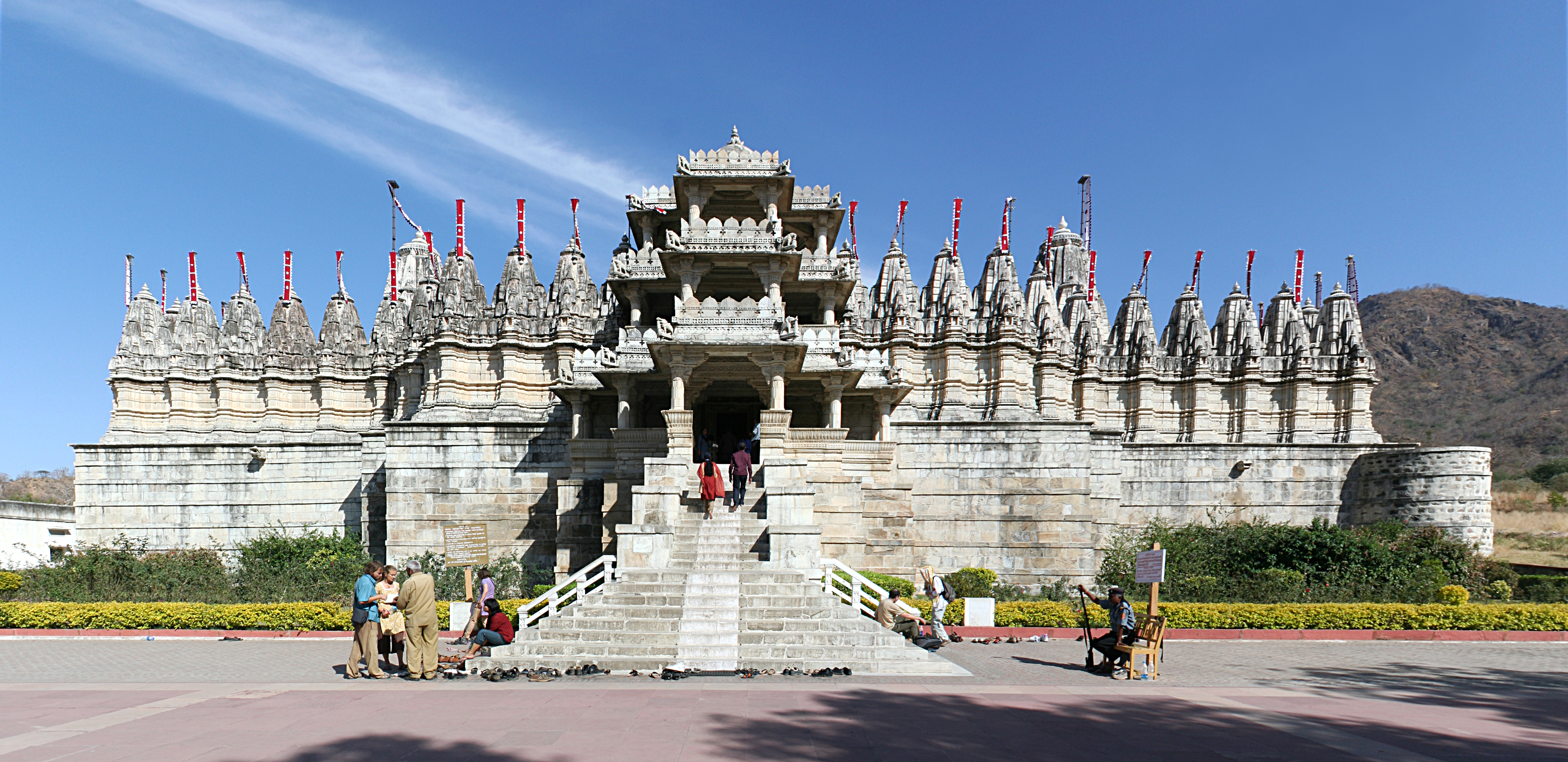
Ranakpur Jain temple, Ranakpur, Rajasthan

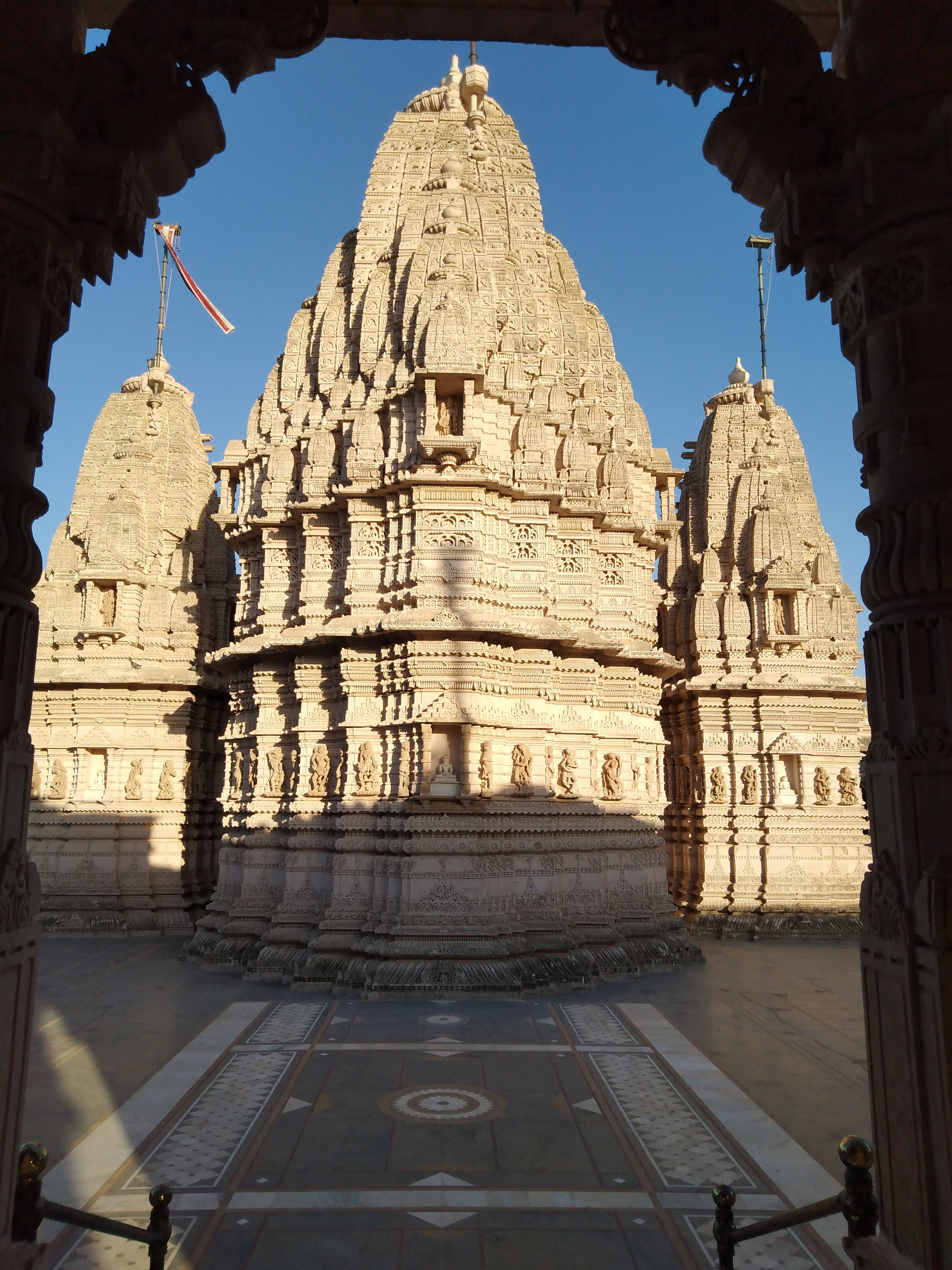
Vanki - Patri Jain temple, Kutch, Gujarat

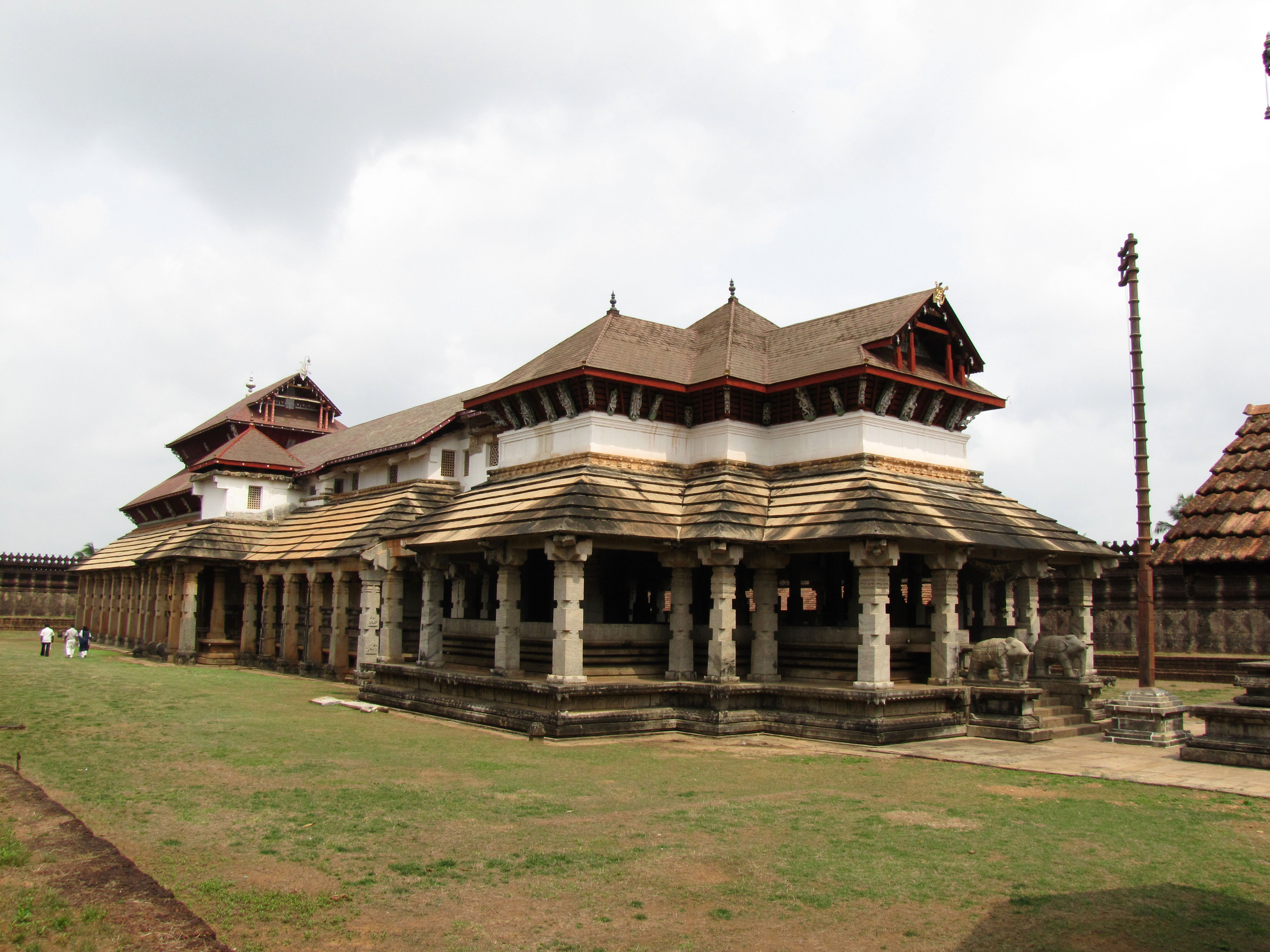
Saavira Kambada Basadi, Moodbidri, Karnataka

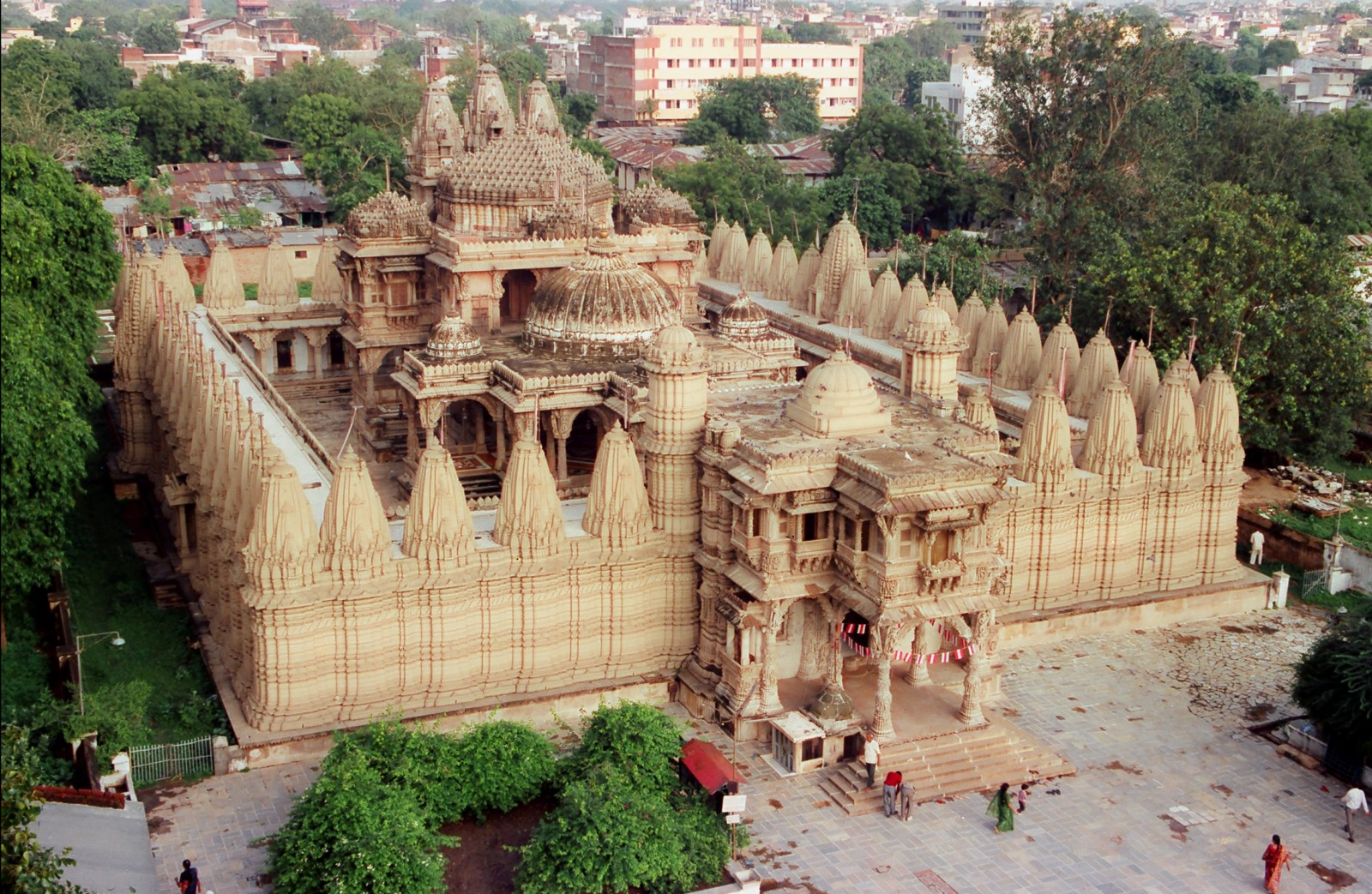
Hutheesing Jain Temple (1848)

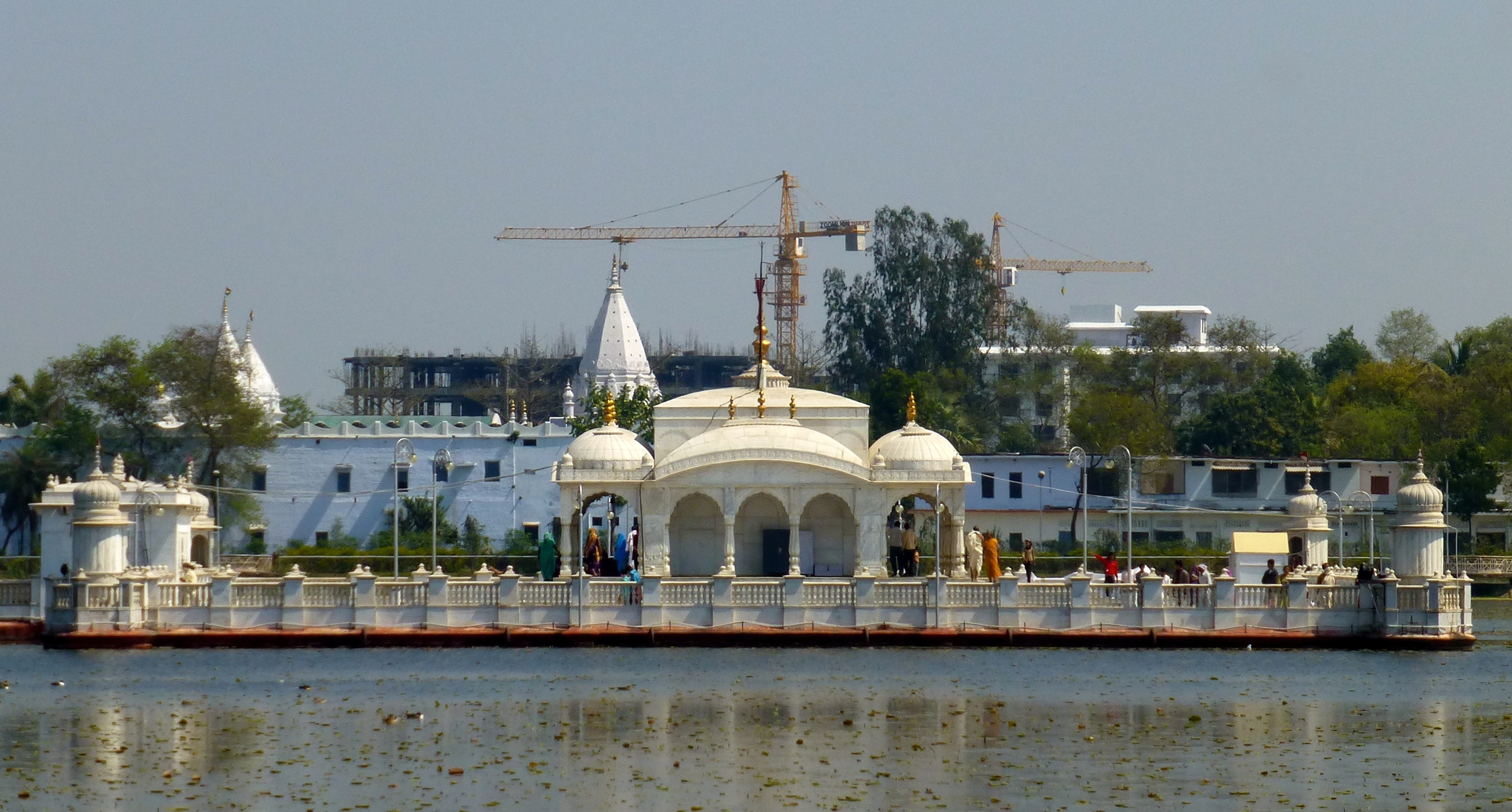
Jal Mandir, Pawapuri

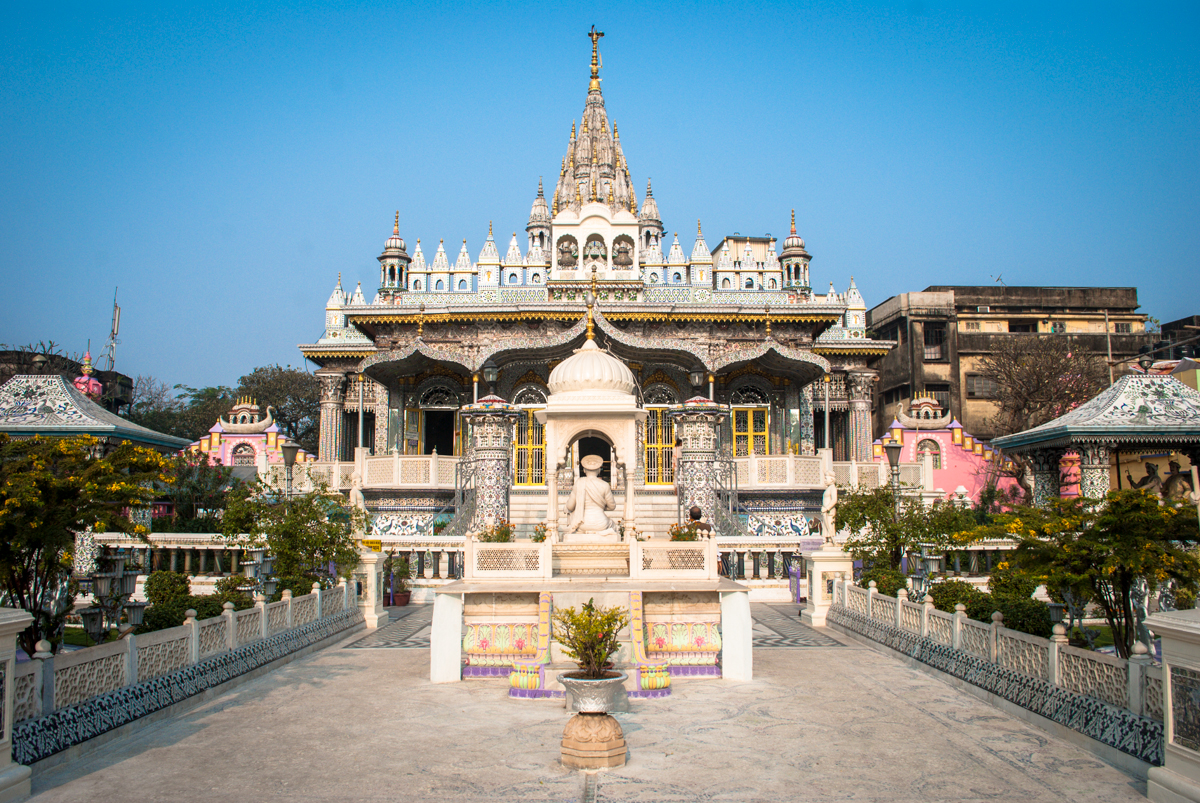
Calcutta Jain Temple in Calcutta (1867)

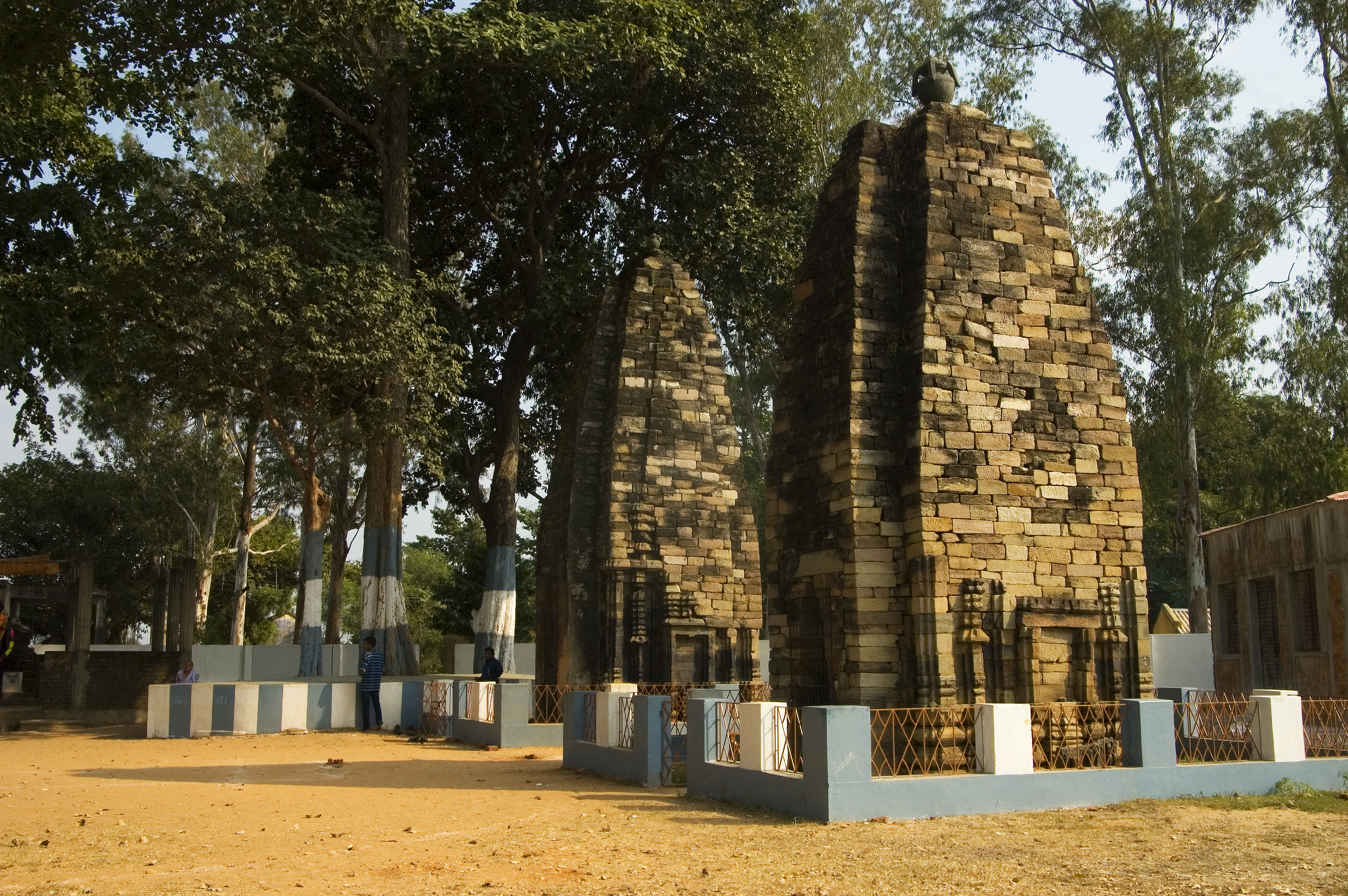
Pakbirra Jain temples, Purulia, West Bengal

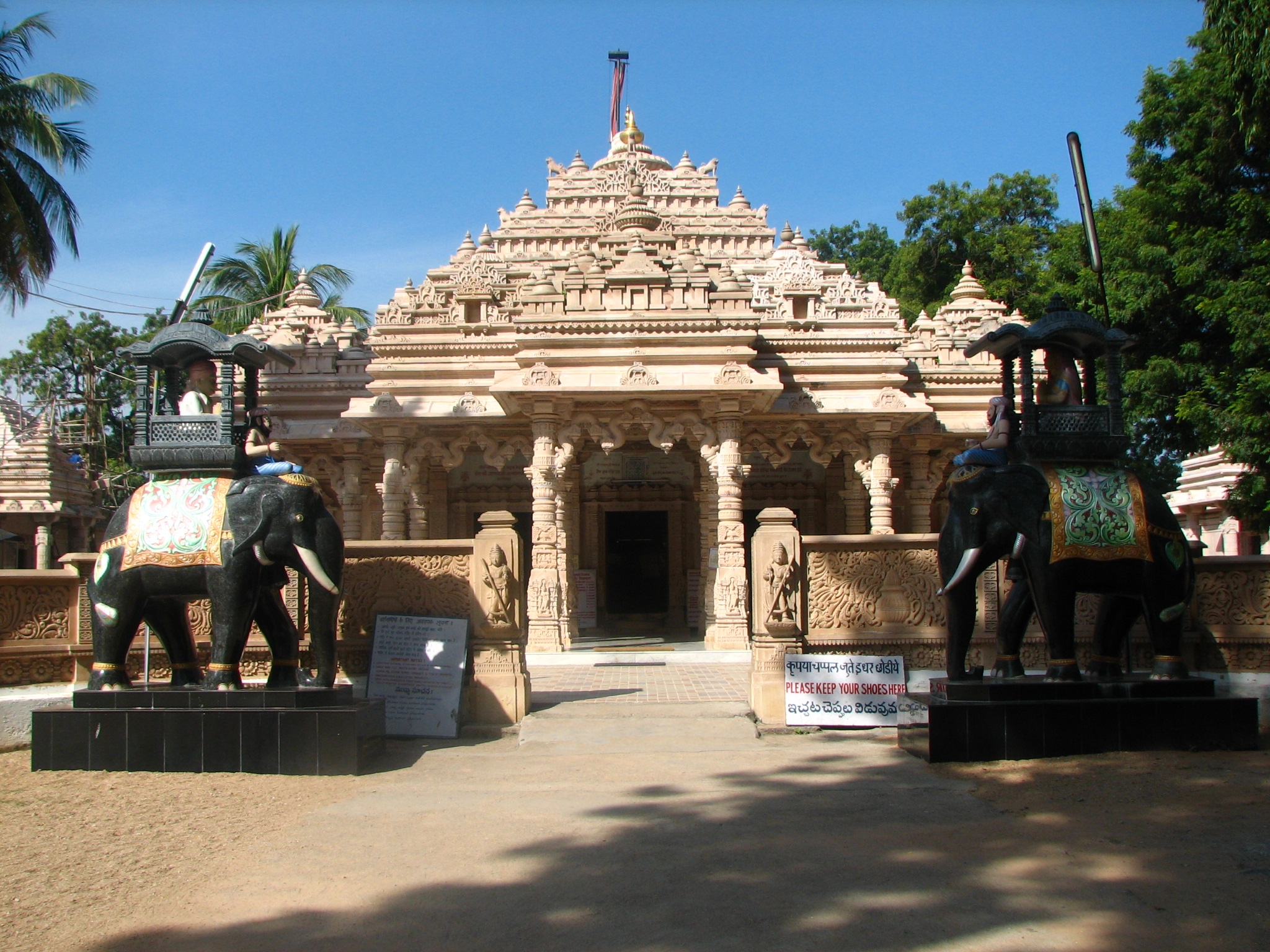
Kulpakji Temple at Nalgonda, Telangana, with dravida (southern style) tower

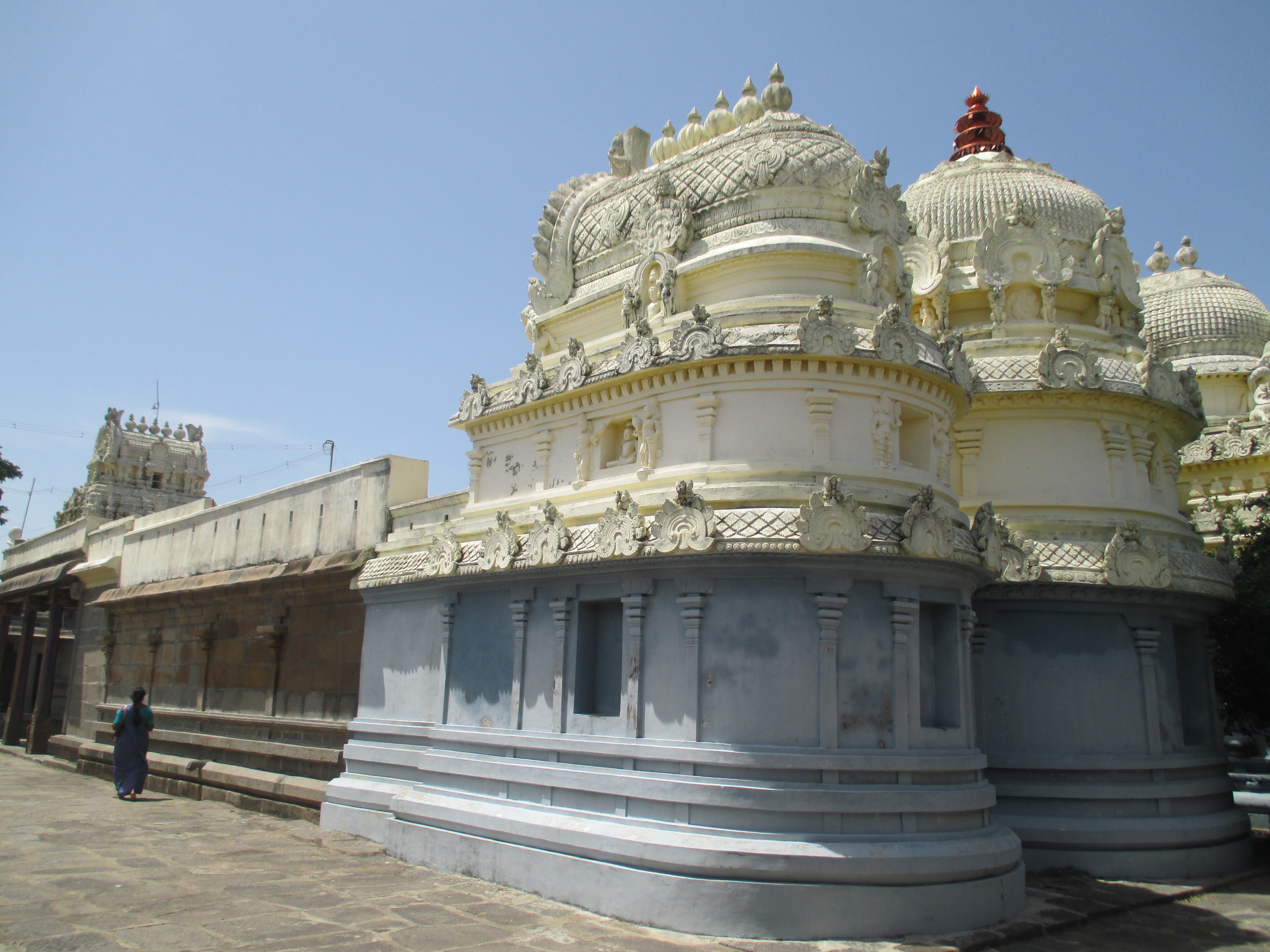
Trilokyanatha Temple in Kanchipuram an example of a Dravidian style Jain temple

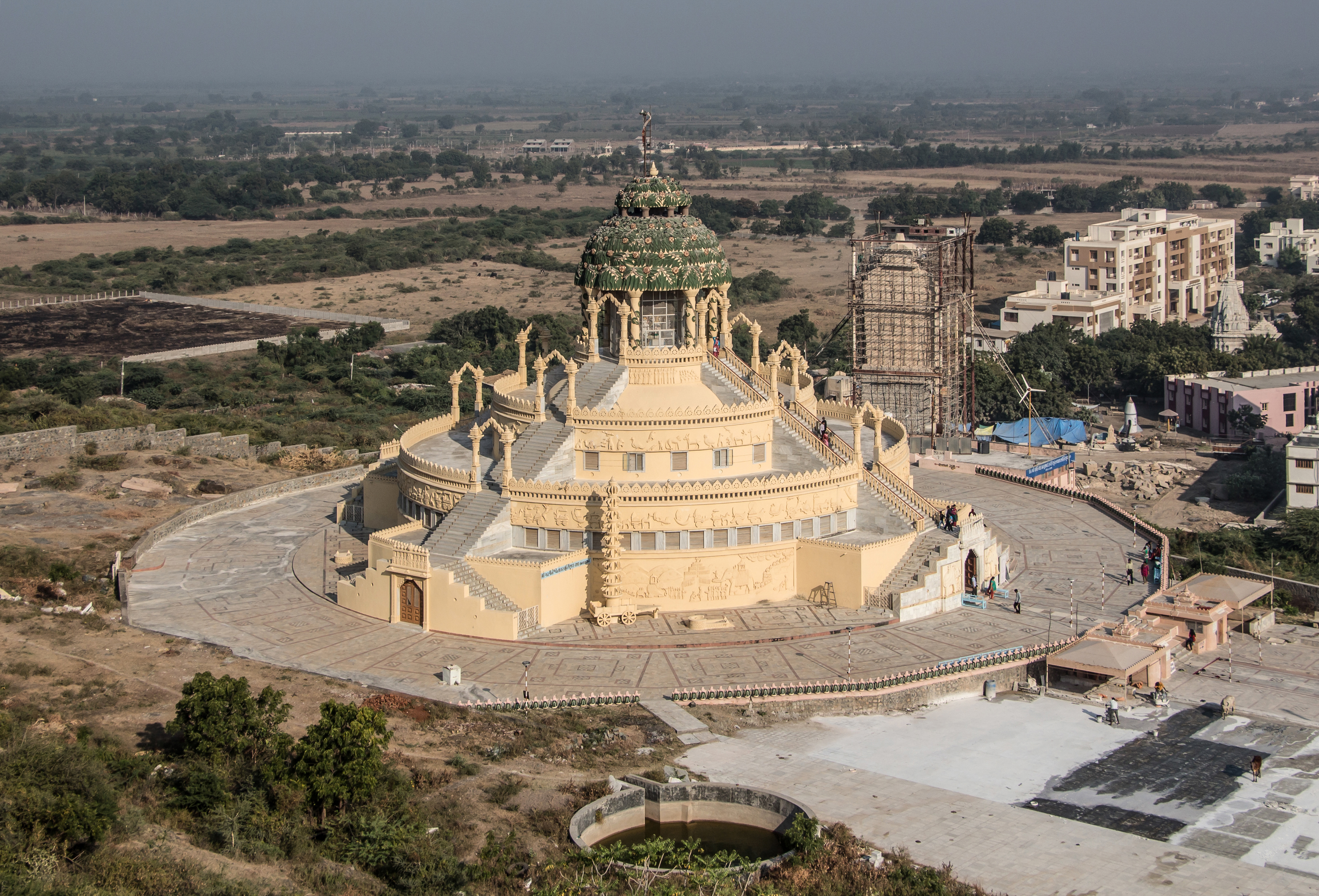
Samovsaran Mandir in Palitana, Gujarat

=== Outside India ===
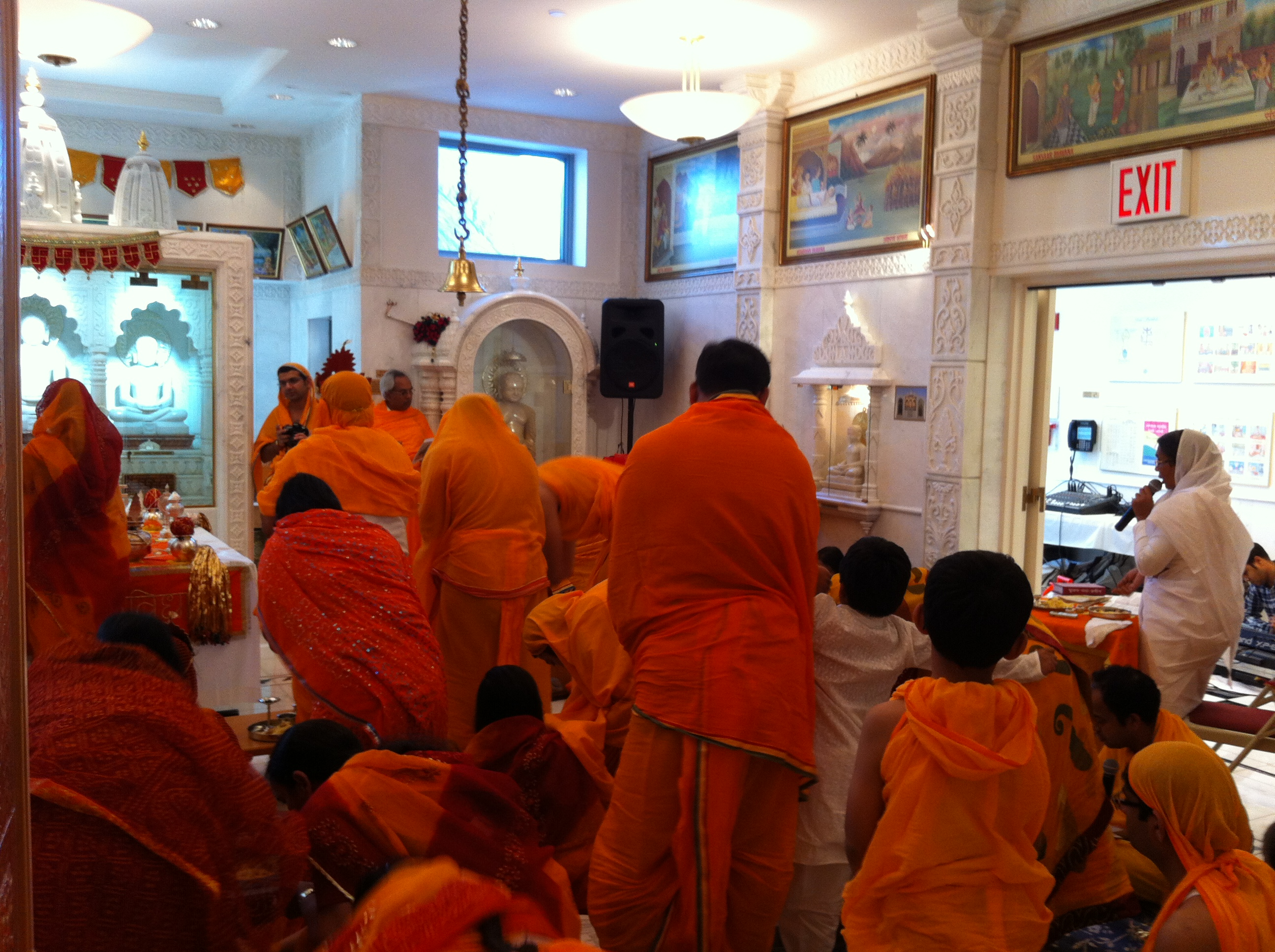
Das Lakshana (Paryushana) celebrations at the Jain Center of America, Queens, New York City, the oldest Jain temple in the Western Hemisphere

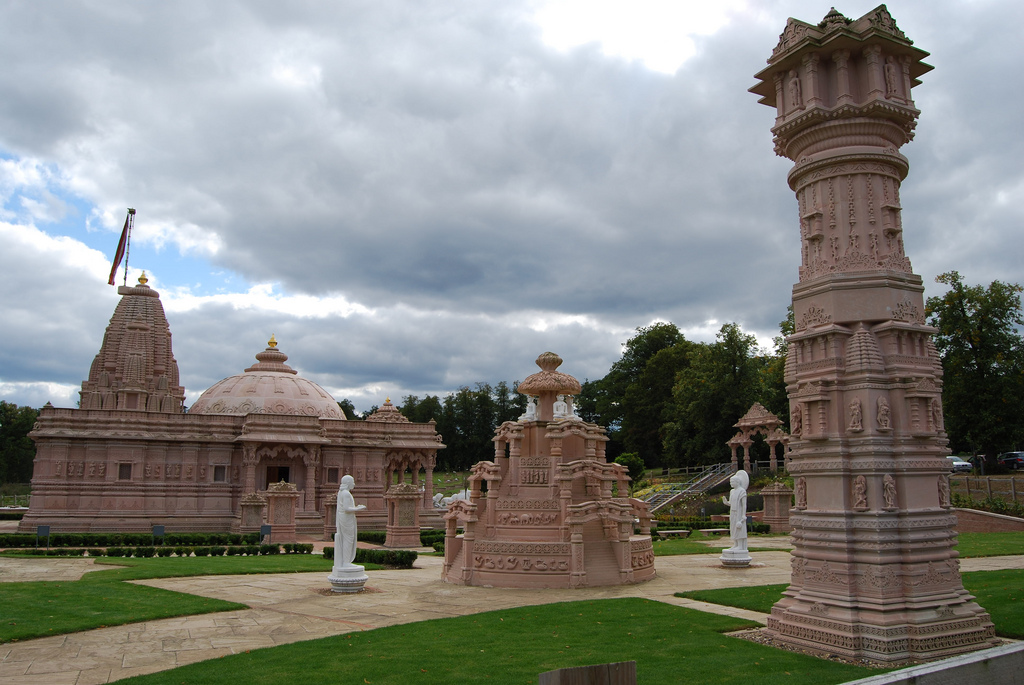
Jain Temple, Potters Bar, Hertfordshire

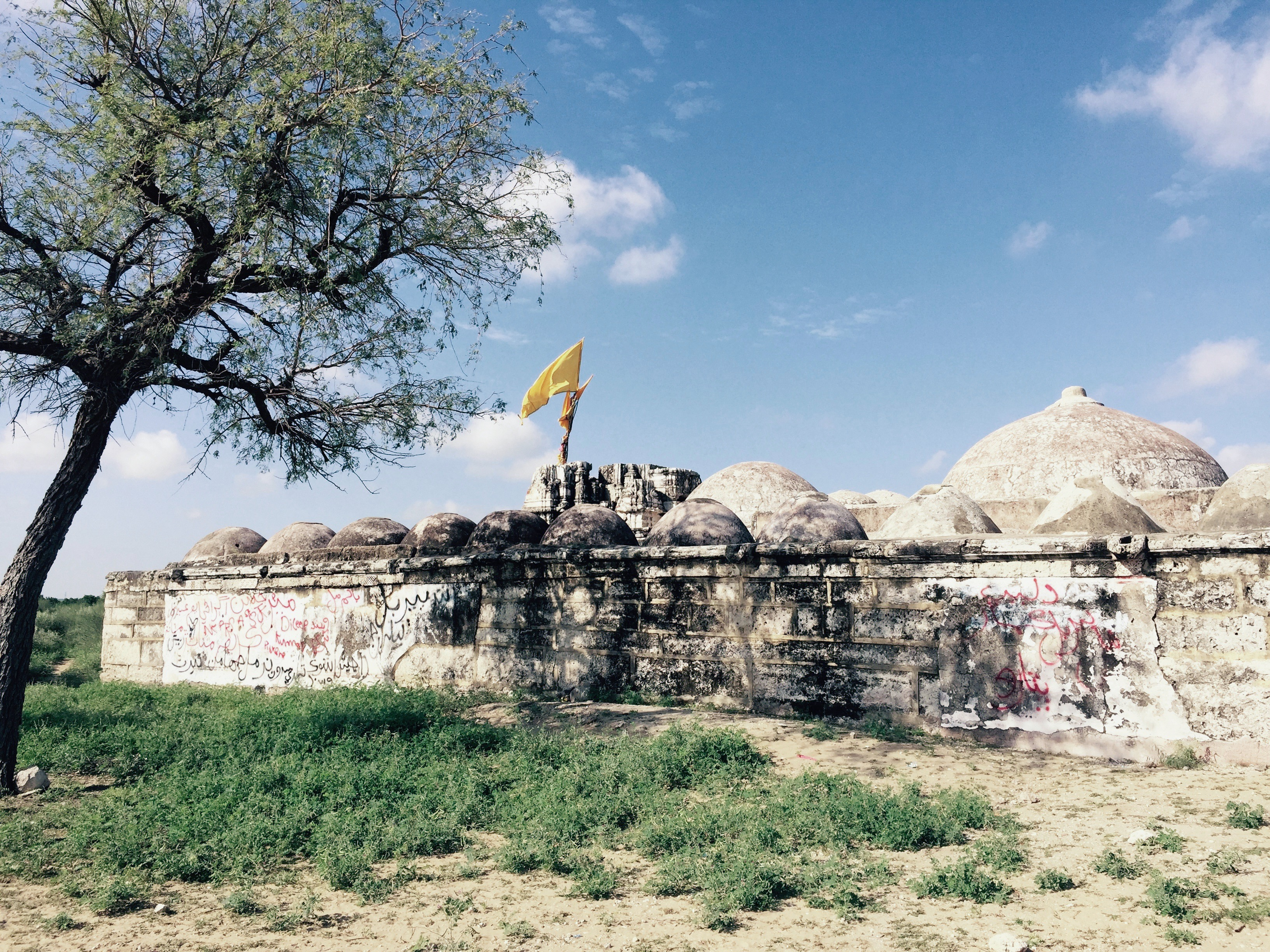
Godiji, Nagarparkar Temples, Pakistan

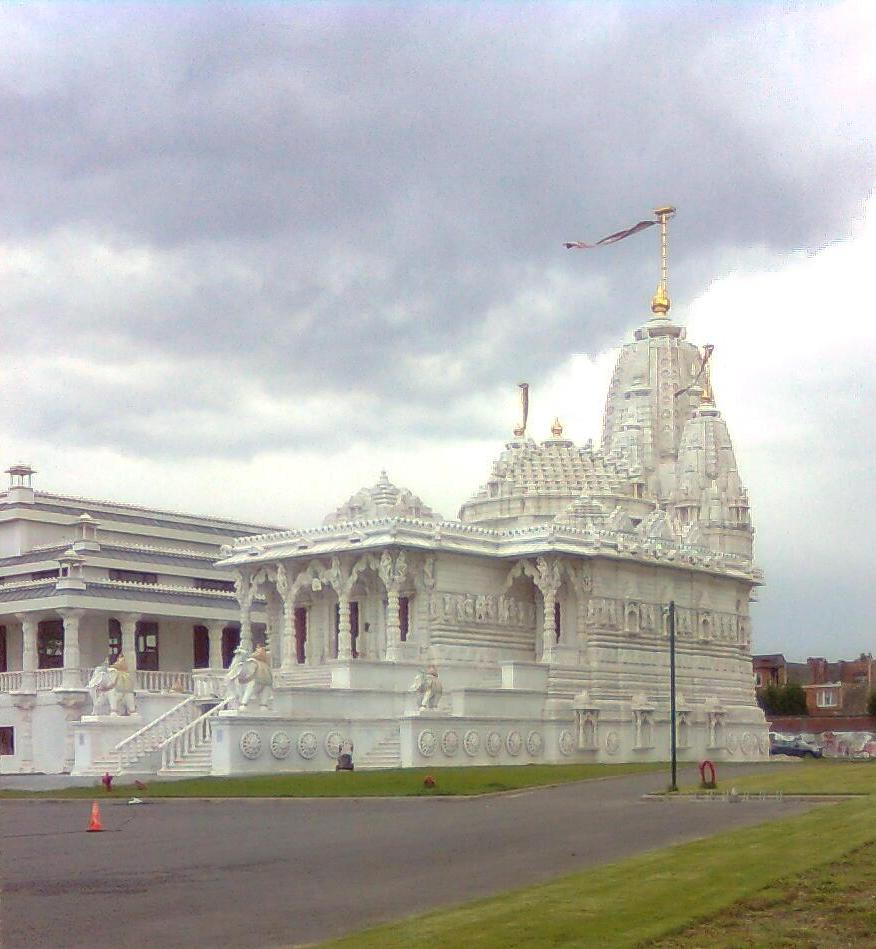
Jain temple, Antwerp, Belgium

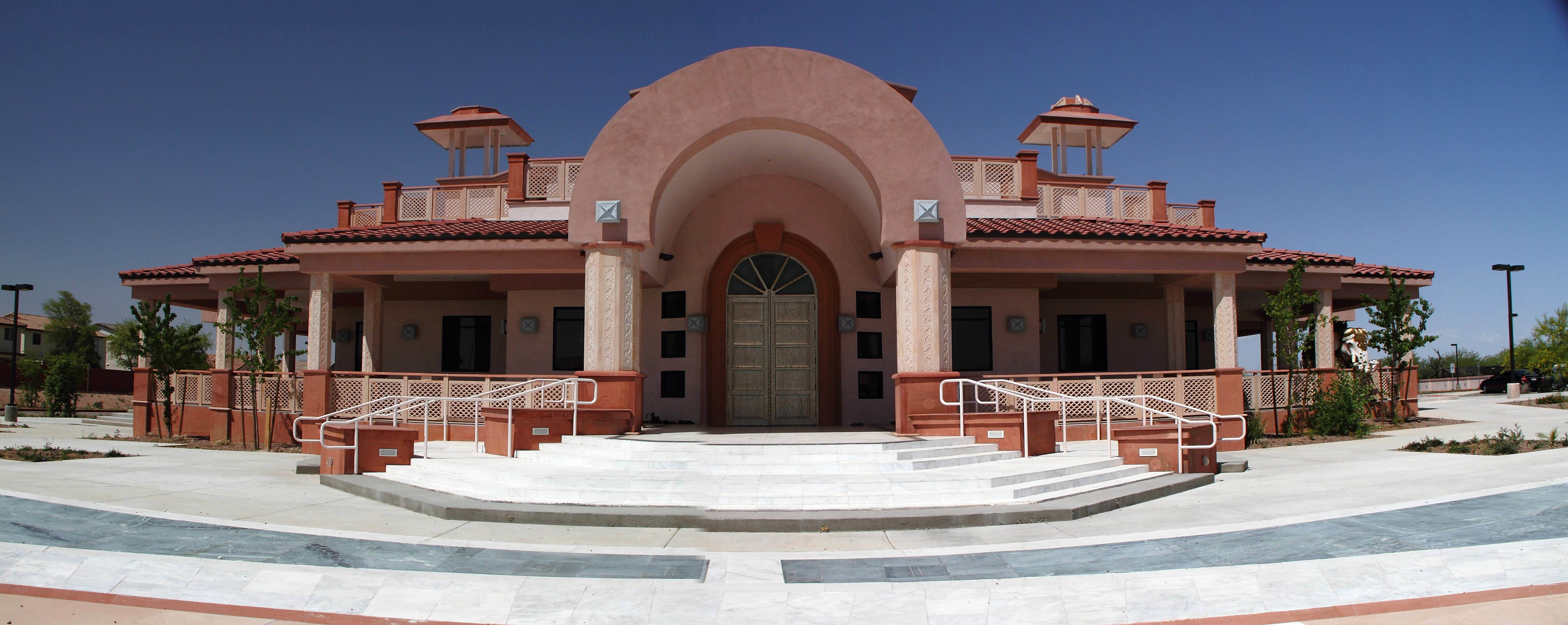
Jain Center of Greater Phoenix (JCGP), Phoenix, Arizona

== See also ==
- List of largest Jain temples
- List of Jain temples
- Jain art
- Jain Center of America
- Jain flag
- Jain house temple
- Jain sculpture
- Jain stupa
- Manastambha
- Tirtha (Jainism)
