= JAINA =

Jain religious organization in North America

Federation of Jain Associations in North America
- Formation: 1981
- Type: Jain religious organization
- Purpose: Religious, charitable, nonprofit
- Headquarters: New York City, United States
- Region served: United States, Canada
- Official language: English
- President: Haresh Shah
- Affiliations: Jain organizations in USA and Canada
- Website: www.jaina.org

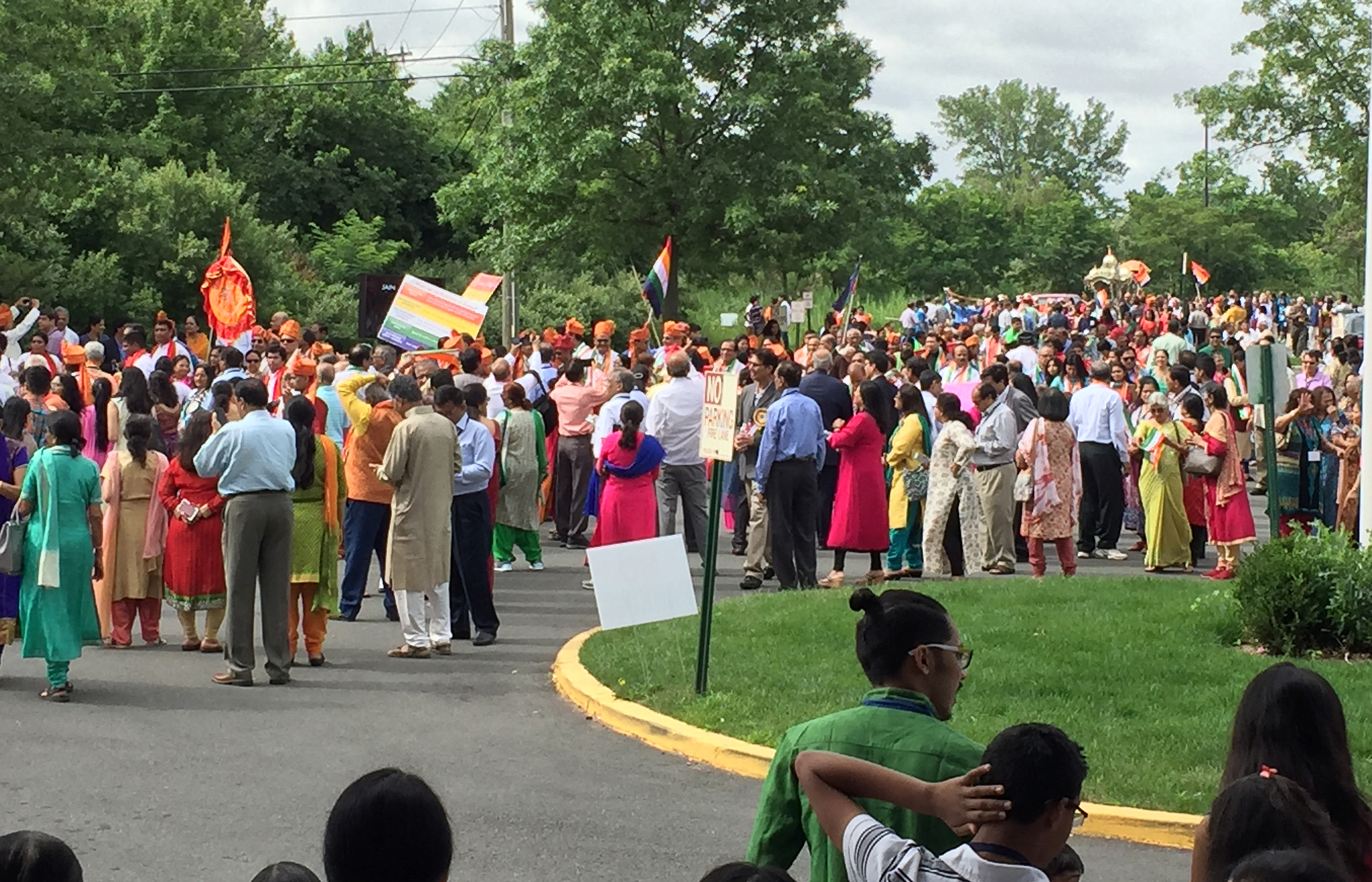
Procession at JAINA 2017 convention at Edison, NJ

JAINA is an acronym for the Federation of Jain Associations in North America, an umbrella organizations to preserve, practice, and promote Jainism in USA and Canada. It was founded in 1981 and formalized in 1983. Among Jain organizations it is unique in that it represents Jains of all sects, and thus effectively represents the entire Jain community in USA and Canada.

== History ==
The Jain Center of Southern California was founded in 1979. Lalit Shah, its Vice President in 1980, suggested establishment of an umbrella organization of all the Jain organizations in North America. At that time about 15 Jain organizations were in existence, including the Jain Center of America, Jain Meditation International Center founded by Chitrabhanu, International Mahavir Jain Mission founded by Sushil Kumar, and Jain centers in Boston and Chicago. The plan for JAINA was conceptualized at the first Jain Convention held in Los Angeles in 1981, and formalized at the second Jain Convention in New York in 1983, with the advice and approval of Chitrabhanu and Sushil Kumar.

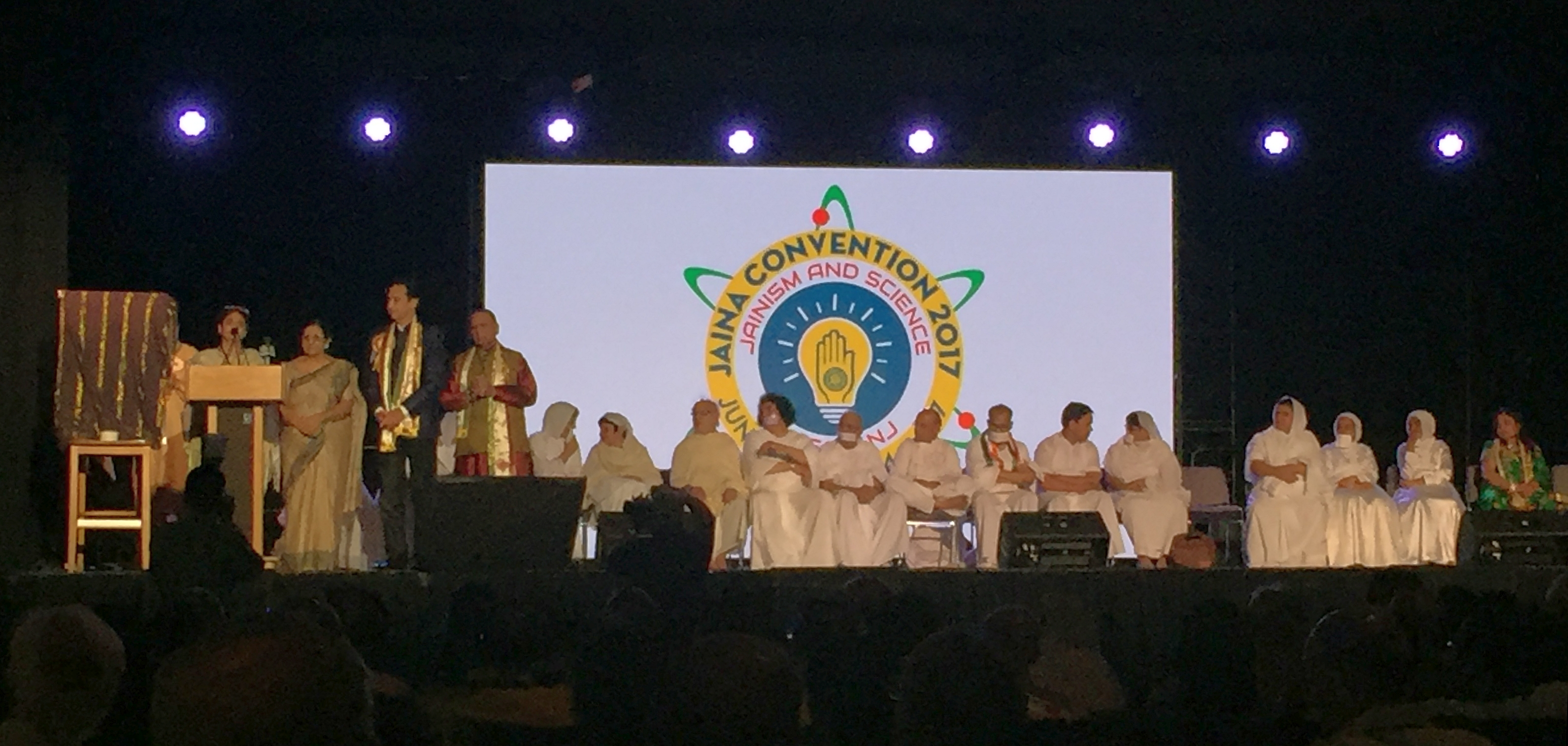
Stage with dignitaries at JAINA 2017 at Edison, NJ

The conventions are now termed JAINA Conventions, and have been held biennially in Los Angeles, New York, Detroit, Chicago, Toronto, San Francisco, Pittsburgh, Chicago, Toronto, Philadelphia, Chicago, Cincinnati, Houston, Detroit, Atlanta, New Jersey & Los Angeles. JAINA also publishes textbooks on Jainism, a calendar, and a monthly magazine, and operates an online Jain library.

== Overview ==
There are over 70 organizations that are part of JAINA. JAINA represents over 160,000 Jains in USA and Canada. It also has 32 subcommittees involved in different activities, including Young Jains of America(YJA), for ages 14–29.

=== JAINA symbol ===
The Federation of Jain Associations in North America uses a modified version of the standard Jain symbol, the Jain Prateek Chihna. It replaces the swastika with a Jain Aum because of the negative connotations associated with the swastika in the western world.

== Conventions ==
JAINA conventions draw thousands of representatives from Jain communities in the USA and Canada.

== JAINA committees ==
There are over 30 JAINA committees. Based on the needs, these committees are more or less active and are at times retired.

- YJA (Young Jains of America)
- Award Committee Standing
- Election Committee Standing
- Fund Raising Committee Standing
- JAINA Constitution & By-Laws as of January 15, 2009 18
- Interfaith Activities Committee Standing
- Jiv Daya Committee Standing
- Long Term Planning Committee Standing - Dipak Doshi(Chairman), Yogendra Jain (Immediate Past Chair)
- Publications Committee Standing
- Tirthoddhar Committee Standing
- Veerchand Raghavji Gandhi Scholarship
- Fund Committee Standing
- World Community Service Committee Standing
- Book Store Committee Operational
- Calendar Committee Operational
- Education Committee Operational
- Governmental & International
- Relations Committee Operational
- Jain Digest Membership Committee Operational
- Jain Networking Forum (JNF) Operational
- Marriage Information Services Committee Operational
- Membership Committee Operational
- Library Committee Operational
- Legal Advisory Committee Operational
- Media/Public Relations Committee Operational
- Media Production Committee Operational
- Patron Program Committee Operational
- Pilgrimage Committee Operational
- Public Affairs Council Operational
- Scholar Visitation Committee Operational
- Technology Committee Operational
- Web Site Committee Operational
- Academic Liaison Committee Ad Hoc
- Adhyatmic Committee Ad Hoc
- Assistance Program Committee Ad Hoc
- Constitution Review Committee Ad Hoc
- Exhibition Committee Ad Hoc
- Jain Centers Resources Committee Ad Hoc
- Jain Milan Committee Ad Hoc
- Jain Rituals Committee Ad Hoc
- North American Jain Families
- Assistance Program Committee Ad Hoc
- North American Jains History Committee Ad Hoc
- Senior Housing Committee Ad Hoc

== Interfaith and relief actions ==
JAINA has been involved in several interfaith actions. It also organizes relief activities.

== JAINA Ratna Award ==
The JAINA Ratna Award is the highest recognition awarded by the North American Jain community for major long term contributions. The first one was given in 1989 to Prof. Duli Chandra Jain for his pioneering editing and publication "Jain Study Circle" It is awarded irregularly after 2–6 years. So far nine JAINA Ratna Awards have been given. The JAINA Ratna award is distinct from the 26 Jain Ratna awards given by the Prime Minister of India Atal Bihari Vajpayee on the occasion of Lord Mahavira's 2600th birth anniversary celebrations.

== Young Jains of America (YJA) ==
Young Jains of America (YJA) is the youth arm of the Federation of the Jain Associations in North America (JAINA), a non-profit religious organization. YJA serves Jain youth from ages 14–29. YJA was first established in 1991, and held its first biennial youth convention in 1994, and having biennial conventions there on after.

== See also ==
- Jain Center of America
- Jainism in the United States
- Jainism in Canada
- Jain Center of Southern California
