= Outline of Jainism =

Indian religion

The following is an outline and topical guide of Jainism:

Jainism, also known as Jain Dharma, is an Indian religion.

== Five Vows ==
- Ahiṃsā (Non-violence)
- Satya (Truth)
- Asteya (Non-stealing)
- Brahmacharya (Chastity)
- Aparigraha (Non-possession)

== Beliefs ==
- Dravya
- Tattva
- Pramana
- Karma
- Saṃsāra
- Cosmology
- God
- Moksha

== Major schools ==
- Digambara (sky-clad)
- Śvetāmbara (white-clad)

== Jainism by location ==
=== Jainism by continent ===
- Jainism in Africa
- Jainism in Europe

=== Jainism by subregion ===
- Jainism in Southeast Asia

=== Jainism by country ===
- Jainism in Afghanistan
- Jainism in Australia
- Jainism in Bangladesh
- Jainism in Belgium
- Jainism in Brunei
- Jainism in Cambodia
- Jainism in Canada
- Jainism in Germany
- Jainism in India
- Jainism in Indonesia
- Jainism in Ireland
- Jainism in Japan
- Jainism in Kenya
- Jainism in Laos
- Jainism in Malaysia
- Jainism in Myanmar
- Jainism in Nepal
- Jainism in Pakistan
- Jainism in Poland
- Jainism in Singapore
- Jainism in South Africa
- Jainism in Thailand
- Jainism in the United Kingdom
- Jainism in the United States
- Jainism in Vietnam

=== Jainism by special administrative region ===
- Jainism in Hong Kong

=== Jainism by administrative division ===
- Jainism in Assam
- Jainism in Bengal
- Jainism in Bundelkhand
- Jainism in Goa
- Jainism in Gujarat
- Jainism in Haryana
- Jainism in Karnataka
- Jainism in Maharashtra
- Jainism in Nagaland
- Jainism in Rajasthan
- Jainism in Tamil Nadu
- Jainism in Uttar Pradesh

=== Jainism by city ===
- Jainism in Delhi
- Jainism in Mumbai

== Texts ==
=== The Śvētāmbara Siddhāntha ===
==== Angās (limbs) ====
- Āyāraṃga
- Sūyagaḍa
- Ṭhāṇaṃga
- Samavāyaṃga
- Viyāha-pannatti / Bhagavaī
- Nāyā-dhamma-kahāo
- Uvāsaga-dasāo
- Aṇuttarovavāiya-dasāo
- Anuttaraupapātikadaśāh
- Paṇha-vāgaraṇa

==== Twelve Upāṅgas (auxiliary limbs) ====
- Uvavāiya-sutta
- Rāya-paseṇaijja (also known as Rāyapaseṇiya)
- Jīvājīvābhigama
- Sūriya-pannatti
- Jambūdvīpa-pannatti
- Canda-pannatti
- Nirayāvaliyāo (also known as Kappiya)
- Kappāvaḍaṃsiāo
- Pupphiāo
- Puppha-cūliāo
- Vaṇhi-dasāo

==== Six Chedasūtras (Texts relating to the conduct and behaviour of monks and nuns) ====
- Āyāra-dasāo
- Bihā Kappa
- Vavahāra
- Nisīha
- Jīya-kappa
- Mahā-nisīha (Note: Only accepted as canonical by Mūrti-pūjaks)
- Four Mūlasūtras
- Dasaveyāliya-sutta
- Uttarajjhayaṇa-sutta
- Piṇḍa-nijjutti and Ogha-nijjutti (Note: Only accepted as canonical by Mūrti-pūjaks)
- Two Cūlikasūtras ("appendixes")
- Nandī-sūtra
- Anuyogadvāra-sūtra

== Tirthankaras ==
- Rishabhanatha
- Ajitanatha
- Sambhavanatha
- Abhinandananatha
- Sumatinatha
- Padmaprabha
- Suparshvanatha
- Chandraprabha
- Pushpadanta (also known as Suvidhinatha)
- Shitalanatha
- Shreyansanatha
- Vimalanatha
- Anantanatha
- Dharmanatha
- Shantinatha
- Kunthunatha
- Aranatha
- Mallinatha
- Munisuvrata
- Naminatha
- Neminatha (also known as Nemi and Ariṣṭanemi)
- Parshvanatha (also known as Pārśva and Pārasanātha)
- Mahavira (also known as Vardhamana)

== Jain symbols ==
- Ashtamangala
  - Parasol
  - Dhvaja
  - Kalasha
  - Fly-whisk
  - Mirror
  - Chair
  - Hand fan
  - Vessel
  - Srivatsa
  - Nandavarta
  - Vardhmanaka
  - Pair of fish
- Jain emblem
- Jain flag
- Om
- Swastika
- Symbol of Ahimsa

== Celebrated days ==
- Diwali
- Kshamavani (Note: Only celebrated by the Digambara (sky-clad) sect of Jainism)
- Paryushana

== Lists ==
=== Lists of Jains ===
- List of ancient Jains
- List of Digambara Jain ascetics
- List of Jain monks
- List of Jains

=== Lists of Jain temples ===
- List of ancient Jain temples
- List of Jain temples
- List of largest Jain temples

=== Timelines ===
- Timeline of Jainism

=== Indexes ===
- Index of Jainism-related articles

=== Other lists ===
- List of Jain inscriptions
- List of writers on Jainism

== Jainism and other religions ==
- Jainism and Buddhism
- Jainism and Hinduism
- Jainism and Islam
- Jainism and Sikhism

== Jainism and science ==
- Jainism and non-creationism

== Jainism and society ==
- Sexual differences in Jainism
