= Jain communities =

People who practice Jainism

The Jain community, or Jains, are the followers of Jainism, an ancient Indian religion. Although they constitute a small demographic minority—representing approximately 0.4% of the Indian population—the community is recognized as one of the most literate and wealthiest groups in the country. Jains are predominantly urbanized within India and maintain a notable global diaspora across regions such as North America, Europe, and East Africa.

Traditionally, the community is structured as a symbiotic "four-fold order" (chaturvidha sangha) that comprises male and female monastics (muni and aryika) alongside laymen and laywomen (śrāvaka and śrāvikā). Religiously, the community is primarily divided into two major sectarian traditions—the Digambara and Śvetāmbara—which split over historical differences in monastic discipline and canonical scripture. Socially, the Jain laity has historically organized itself around regional affiliations and the caste system (Jāti), with caste councils historically enforcing norms such as strict endogamy and dietary restrictions.

The distinct socio-economic profile of the Jain community is deeply intertwined with their rigorous application of core ethical vows, particularly nonviolence (ahimsa) and non-attachment (Aparigraha). Because strict interpretations of nonviolence prohibited professions that harmed living beings, such as agriculture or military service, the Jain laity historically gravitated toward trade, mercantile banking, and finance. This ethical restriction fostered a legacy of prominent Jain merchants who financed empires and played pioneering roles in India's modern industrialization. Furthermore, the ethic of non-attachment has cultivated a vast tradition of philanthropy, resulting in the continuous funding of public welfare institutions, animal sanctuaries (panjrapoles), ancient manuscript libraries, and monumental temple architecture across the Indian subcontinent.

== Sangha (The Four-fold Order) ==
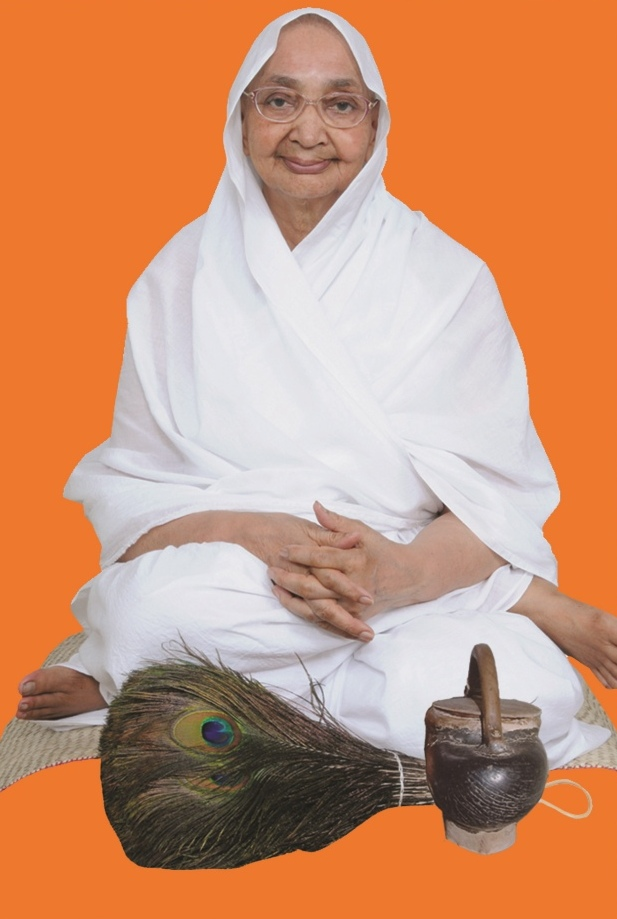
Gyanmati, a Jain Aryika (nun)

The Jain community, or Sangha, is traditionally described as a "four-fold order" (chaturvidha sangha). This structure consists of two main branches:

- The Renunciant Order: Comprising the muni (male monastics) and aryika (female monastics).
- The Lay Order (or Householders): Comprising the Śrāvaka (laymen) and śrāvikā (laywomen).

The relationship between these two branches is symbiotic and central to Jain society. The monastic community renounces all worldly possessions and focuses on asceticism and spiritual purification. In return, the lay community provides the monastics with material support (such as food, water, and shelter), for which they receive spiritual guidance and merit (puṇya).

The two orders follow the same five core vows, but at different levels of severity. Monastics adhere to the Five Great Vows (Mahavratas), which require complete renunciation, including absolute celibacy and non-possession. The laity follows the Five "Small Vows" (Anuvratas), which are a less-strict application of the same principles, designed to be compatible with a householder's life. This path allows the laity to practice core Jain ethics—such as non-violence (Ahimsa) and non-attachment (Aparigraha)—while remaining engaged in society, family, and professional life.

== Sects and traditions ==
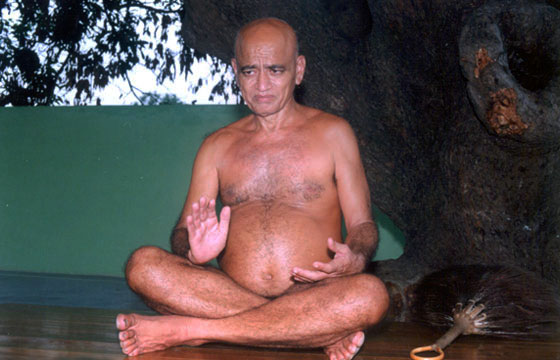
Acharya Vidyasagar, Digambara monk and social reformer

Jain identity is not based on a single criterion but on an overlapping set of religious and social affiliations.

=== Primary Sectarian Divisions (Sampradāyas) ===
The most profound schism in Jainism occurred historically over differences in monastic discipline, scripture, and doctrine. This led to two main traditions that function as distinct communities.

- Digambara: Meaning "sky-clad," the Digambara tradition holds that male monks (munis) must renounce all possessions, including clothing, to achieve liberation. They believe the original Agamas (scriptures) were lost and do not accept the Svetambara canon. Digambara theology also maintains that women must be reborn as men to attain moksha (liberation). This tradition is most prevalent in Southern and Central India.
- Svetambara: Meaning "white-clad," the Svetambara tradition permits monks and nuns (sadhvis) to wear simple, white robes. They preserve a large body of canonical scriptures, the Agamas, which they believe to be the teachings of Mahavira. Svetambaras also believe that women are capable of achieving moksha in their current birth and have a large, active order of nuns. This tradition is dominant in Western India (Gujarat and Rajasthan).

=== Major Sub-Sects and Monastic Traditions ===
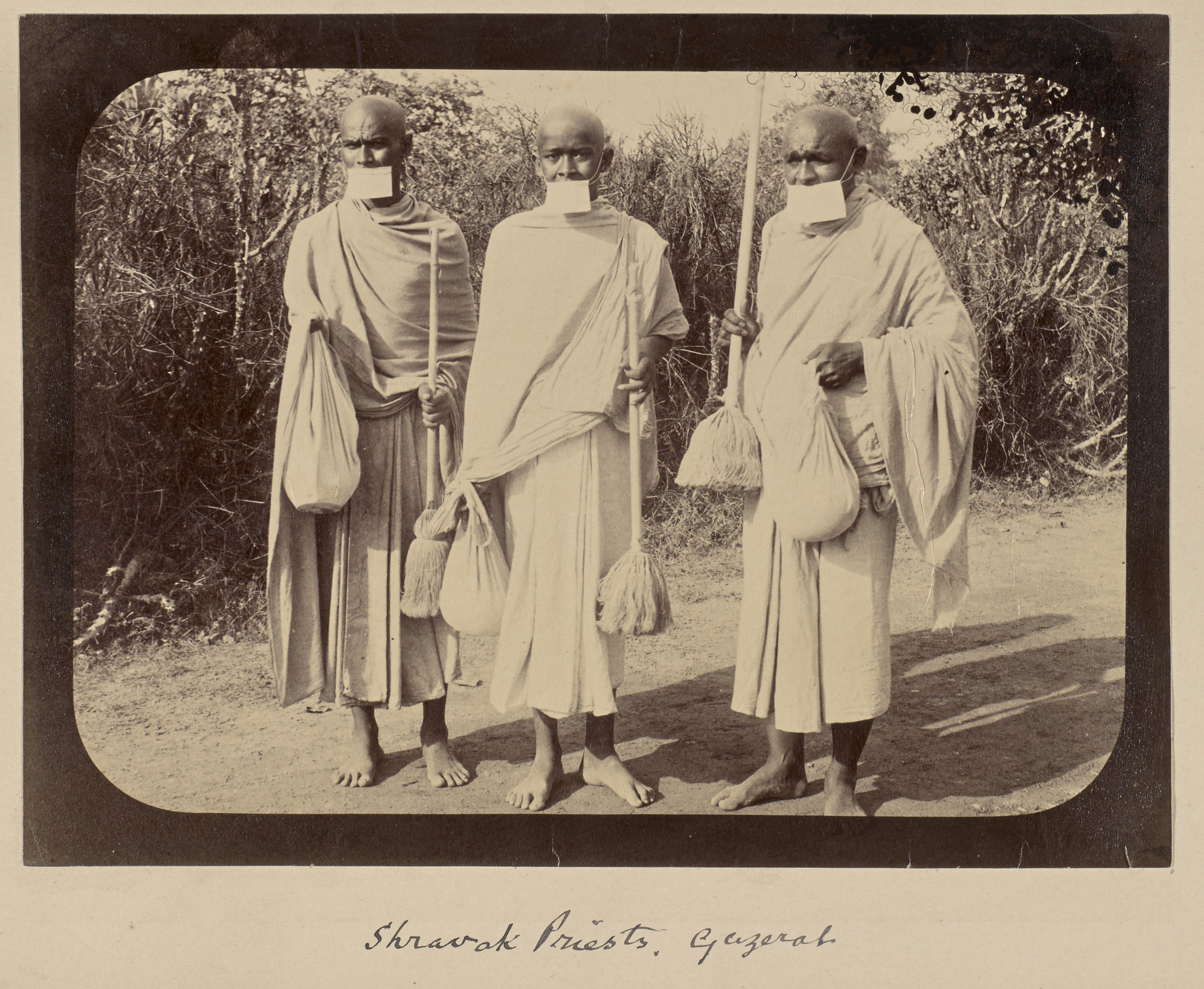
Sthānakavāsī monks from Gujarat

Over centuries, both major sects experienced reforms and further divisions, leading to the sub-sect communities that most Jains identify with today.

==== Svetambara Sub-Sects ====
- Murtipujak (or Deravasi): The largest Svetambara group. Their name, "idol-worshipper," signifies their central religious practice of devotional worship (puja) to idols of tirthankaras in ornate temples (derasars or mandirs).
- Sthānakavāsī: This reformist sect emerged in the 17th century from the Lonka Shah reforms. They reject idol worship and temples, instead performing their religious duties in simple prayer halls called sthanaks. They emphasize meditation and the study of the Agamas.
- Terapanthi: A reformist sect that split from the Sthanakvasi tradition in the 18th century under the leadership of Acharya Bhikshu. The Terapanth is a highly organized community with a single living Acharya as its supreme head, emphasizing discipline, simplicity, and non-idol worship.

==== Digambara Sub-Sects ====
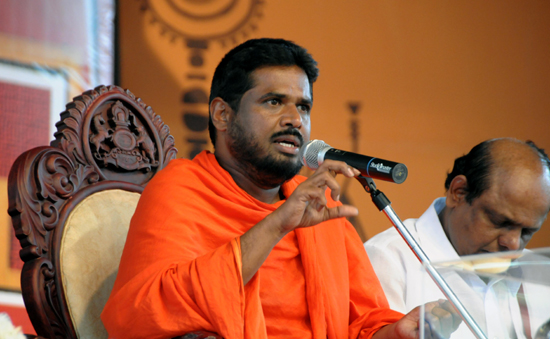
Bhattaraka Bhuvanakeerthi

- Bispanthi: This group follows the traditional Digambara practices, including the worship of tirthankara idols and the presence of Bhattarakas (monastic patriarchs who sometimes sit on thrones). Their pujas are often elaborate, involving flowers, fruits, and saffron.
- Terapanthi: This reformist sect emerged in the 17th century to oppose the authority of the Bhattarakas and the perceived ritual excesses of the Bispanthis. Their worship is simpler and more austere.
- Taranpanthi (or Samaiyapanthi): A 15th-century reformist sect that rejects idol worship entirely, focusing instead on the study of sacred texts written by its founder, Taran Svami.

== Social structure and governance ==
=== Jāti and the caste system ===
A central distinction in the sociology of Jainism exists between its religious philosophy and its historical social practice. While religious teachers (Jain Acharyas) and foundational scriptures rejected the hereditary class system (Varna) as a basis for spiritual advancement, the Jain lay community, in practice, adopted the "caste-bound" social structure of the regions in which it lived. This created a "great tension" where a non-Vedic philosophy co-existed with a conventional social system based on caste (Jāti).

For the Jain laity, the Jāti—not the religious sect—has historically been the primary unit of social identity and community. These Jātis are often regional in nature and frequently correspond to sub-divisions of larger Hindu merchant or Bania castes. For example, prominent northern Jātis such as the Agrawal, Oswal, Porwal, and Khandelwal include both Jain and Hindu Vaishnava members, with social identity and kinship ties often co-existing with religious affiliation. Similarly, distinct Jain castes exist in the Deccan (e.g., Saitwal, Chaturtha, Komati) and in Southern India (e.g., the traditional Jain communities of Karnataka), which have their own unique social histories.

=== Endogamy and community governance ===
The primary function of the Jain Jāti was to regulate the social life of its lay members. The most important rule enforced by the community was strict caste endogamy, which mandated marriage within one's own Jāti. This, along with other community norms such as dietary restrictions, occupational codes, and the resolution of commercial disputes, was historically enforced by a Caste Panchayat (council of elders). These Panchayats held significant power within the community, including the ability to ostracize members who violated the community's core social rules.

== Demographics and distribution ==
=== Population dynamics ===
While Jains constitute a small minority of India's population (approximately 0.37% per the 2011 census of India), the community is noted for its high literacy rate, wealth, and significant philanthropic impact. Scholars have extensively studied the community's distinct socio-economic profile, linking it to the rigorous application of core Jain ethical principles in daily life. According to the 2011 Census of India, there were 4,451,753 Jains in India. The community is largely urban, with a significant majority residing in states such as Maharashtra, Rajasthan, Gujarat, and Madhya Pradesh.

The Jain population in India according to 2011 census is 0.54% i.e. 4,451,753 (Males 2,278,097; Females 2,173,656) out of the total population of India 1,210,854,977 (males 623,270,258; females 587,584,719). The tabular representation of Jain population in the major states of India as per 2011 Census data released by the government is:

| S. No. | State | Persons (total) | Persons (rural) | Persons (urban) | Male (total) | Male (rural) | Male (urban) | Female (total) | Female (rural) | Female (urban) |
|---|---|---|---|---|---|---|---|---|---|---|
| 1 | India | 4,451,753 | 904,809 | 3,546,944 | 2,278,097 | 467,577 | 1,810,520 | 2,173,656 | 437,232 | 1,736,424 |
| 2 | Maharashtra | 1,400,349 | 269,959 | 1,130,390 | 713,157 | 140,476 | 572,681 | 687,192 | 129,483 | 557,709 |
| 3 | Rajasthan | 622,023 | 166,322 | 455,701 | 317,614 | 84,649 | 232,965 | 304,409 | 81,673 | 222,736 |
| 4 | Gujarat | 579,654 | 44,118 | 535,536 | 294,911 | 22,357 | 272,554 | 284,743 | 21,761 | 262,982 |
| 5 | Madhya Pradesh | 567,028 | 109,699 | 457,329 | 291,937 | 57,431 | 234,506 | 275,091 | 52,268 | 222,823 |
| 6 | Karnataka | 440,280 | 220,362 | 219,918 | 225,544 | 113,598 | 111,946 | 214,736 | 106,764 | 107,972 |
| 7 | Uttar Pradesh | 213,267 | 30,144 | 183,123 | 110,994 | 15,852 | 95,142 | 102,273 | 14,292 | 87,981 |
| 8 | Delhi | 166,231 | 192 | 166,039 | 85,605 | 94 | 85,511 | 80,626 | 98 | 80,528 |
| 9 | Tamil Nadu | 89,265 | 10,084 | 79,181 | 45,605 | 5,044 | 40,561 | 43,660 | 5,040 | 38,620 |

The Jain population in United States is estimated to be about 150,000 to 200,000.

In Japan, there are more than 5,000 families who have converted to Jainism and the religion is growing there.

=== Regional communities in India ===
Jains are found in almost every part of the continental Indian subcontinent. There are about 100 different Jain communities in India. They can be divided into five groups based on historical and current residence:

==== Central India ====
- Jainism in Bundelkhand
- Jainism in Madhya Pradesh

The Jain population in Central India is heavily concentrated in the historical region of Bundelkhand and across the modern state of Madhya Pradesh. Bundelkhand remains one of the most vital strongholds for the Digambara sect, characterized by a high concentration of prominent Digambara jātis such as the Parwar, Golapurva, and Golalare communities. The social structure here revolves heavily around local pilgrimage centers and the patronage of vast temple complexes, which have historically unified the regional lay communities.

==== Western India ====
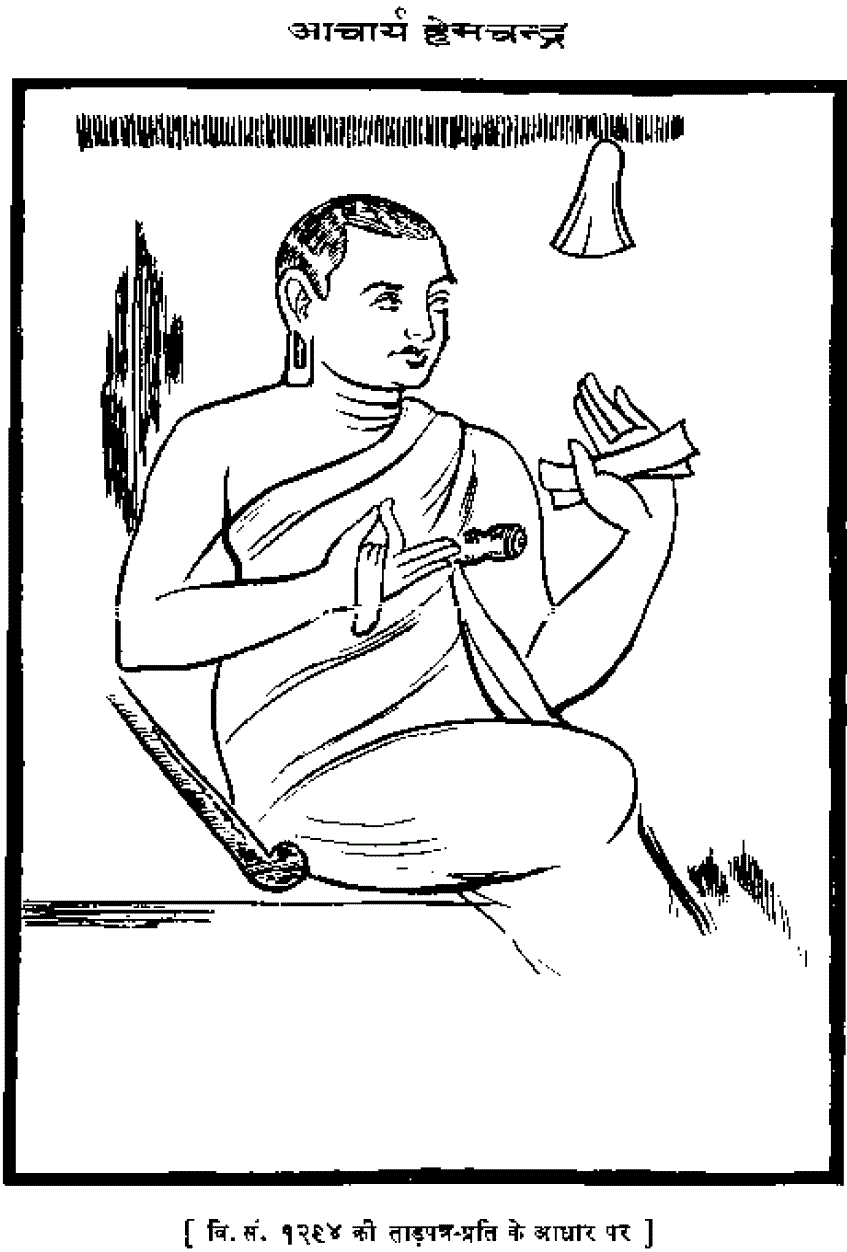
Hemachandra, Jain monk

- Jainism in Gujarat (Gujarati Jain)
- Jainism in Rajasthan (Marwari Jain)
- Jainism in Sindh (Pakistan)

The socio-religious landscape of Western India was profoundly shaped by royal patronage, most notably during the 12th century under the Chaulukya dynasty (Solanki dynasty). Under the spiritual guidance of the polymath monk Hemachandra, King Kumarapala instituted Jain ethical principles across his kingdom, banning animal slaughter and establishing Jainism as a central pillar of the state's cultural identity. This era of royal support solidified Gujarat and Rajasthan as permanent strongholds for the Jain community.

==== Northern India ====
- Jainism in Punjab
  - Jainism in Western Punjab (Pakistan)
- Jainism in Haryana
- Jainism in Delhi
- Jainism in Uttar Pradesh

==== Southern India ====
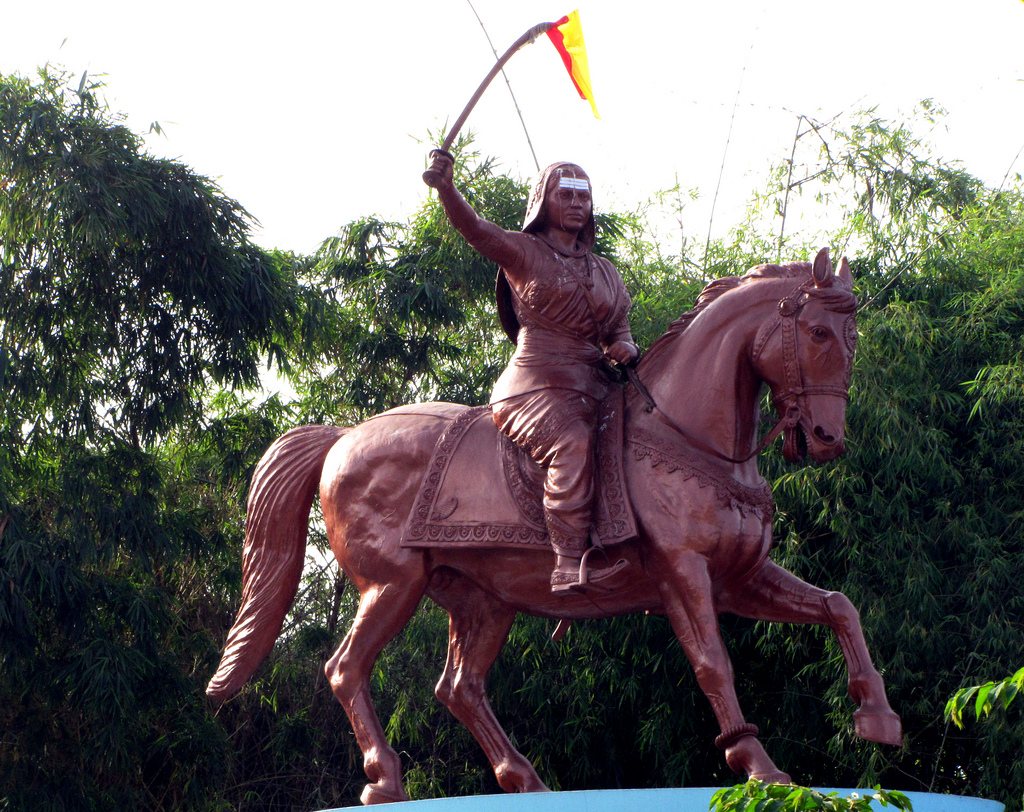
Kittur Chennamma, 19th-century Jain queen

- Jainism in Maharashtra (Marathi Jain)
  - Jainism in Mumbai
- Jainism in Goa
- Jainism in Karnataka
  - Jainism in North Karnataka
  - Jainism in Tulu Nadu
- Jainism in Kerala
- Jainism in Tamil Nadu (Tamil Jain)

In Southern India, the Jain community flourished through centuries of continuous patronage from major imperial dynasties, including the Western Gangas, Rashtrakutas, and Hoysalas. The 9th-century Rashtrakuta Emperor Amoghavarsha I was a devout practitioner who patronized prominent Jain scholars, including his chief preceptor Jinasena, and is credited as a primary author of the foundational Kannada literary text, the Kavirajamarga.

Royal women in Southern India wielded significant administrative and financial power, acting as paramount patrons of Jain institutions. Queen Shantala Devi, the senior queen consort of the Hoysala Empire (12th century), was a devout Jain who heavily financed the construction of Jain temples (basadis) and patronized the arts in the capital of Halebidu, even as her husband, King Vishnuvardhana, followed Vaishnavism. Similarly, prominent female nobles like Attimabbe (known as "Dana Chintamani") utilized royal grants during the Western Chalukya era to commission 1,500 Jain manuscripts and build extensive temple complexes across Karnataka.

==== Eastern India ====
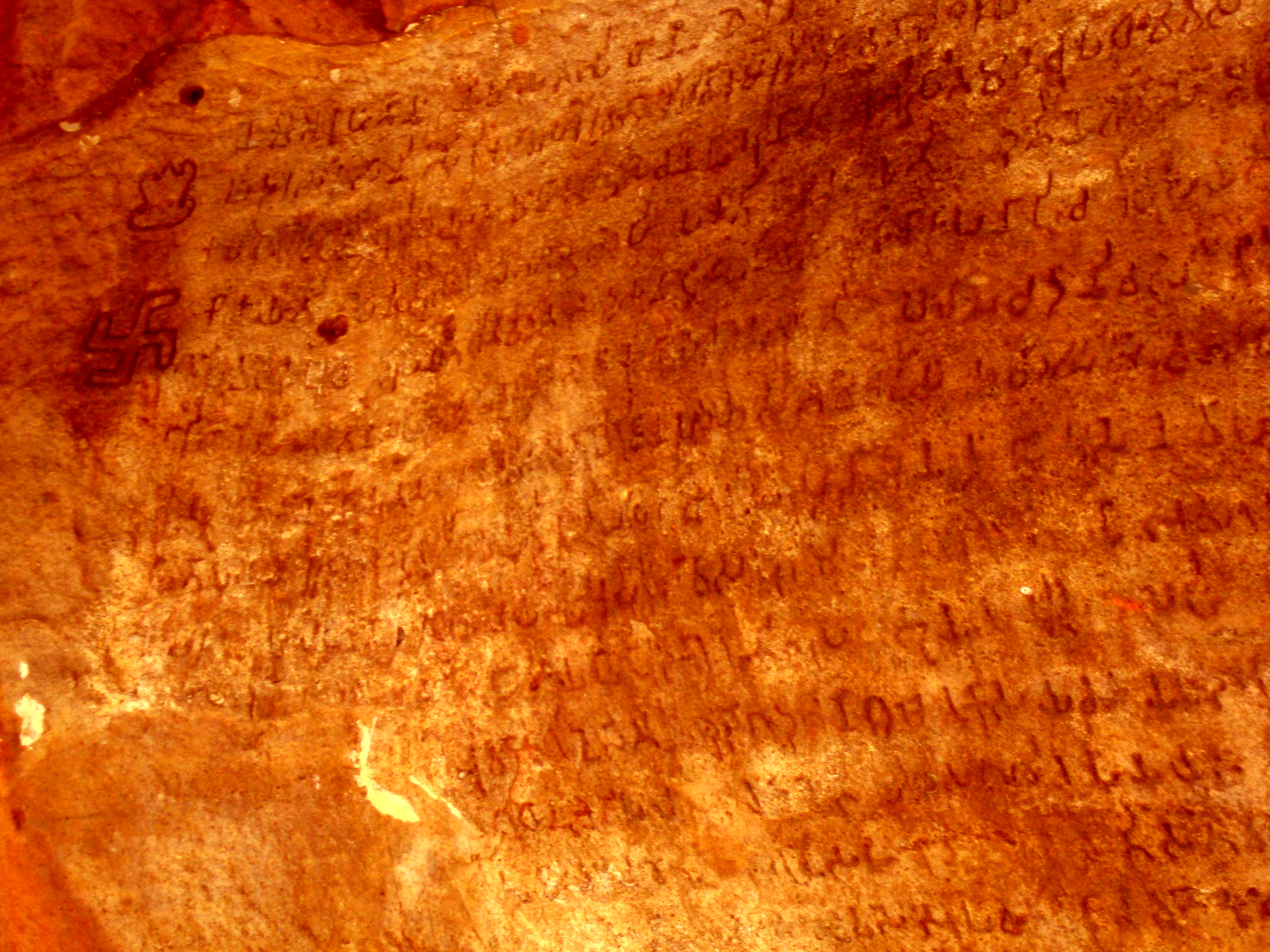
Namokar Mantra inscribed at Hathigumpha inscription by Kharavela c. 20 BCE

- Jainism in Bengal
- Jainism in Nagaland

The historical foundation of the Jain community in Eastern India was heavily bolstered by Emperor Kharavela of the Mahameghavahana dynasty in the 2nd century BCE. According to the Hathigumpha inscription, Kharavela was a Jain monarch who patronized ascetic communities, expanded rock-cut monastic caves at Udayagiri, and victoriously reclaimed the sacred "Kalinga Jina" idol from the Nanda Empire of Magadha.

=== Global diaspora ===
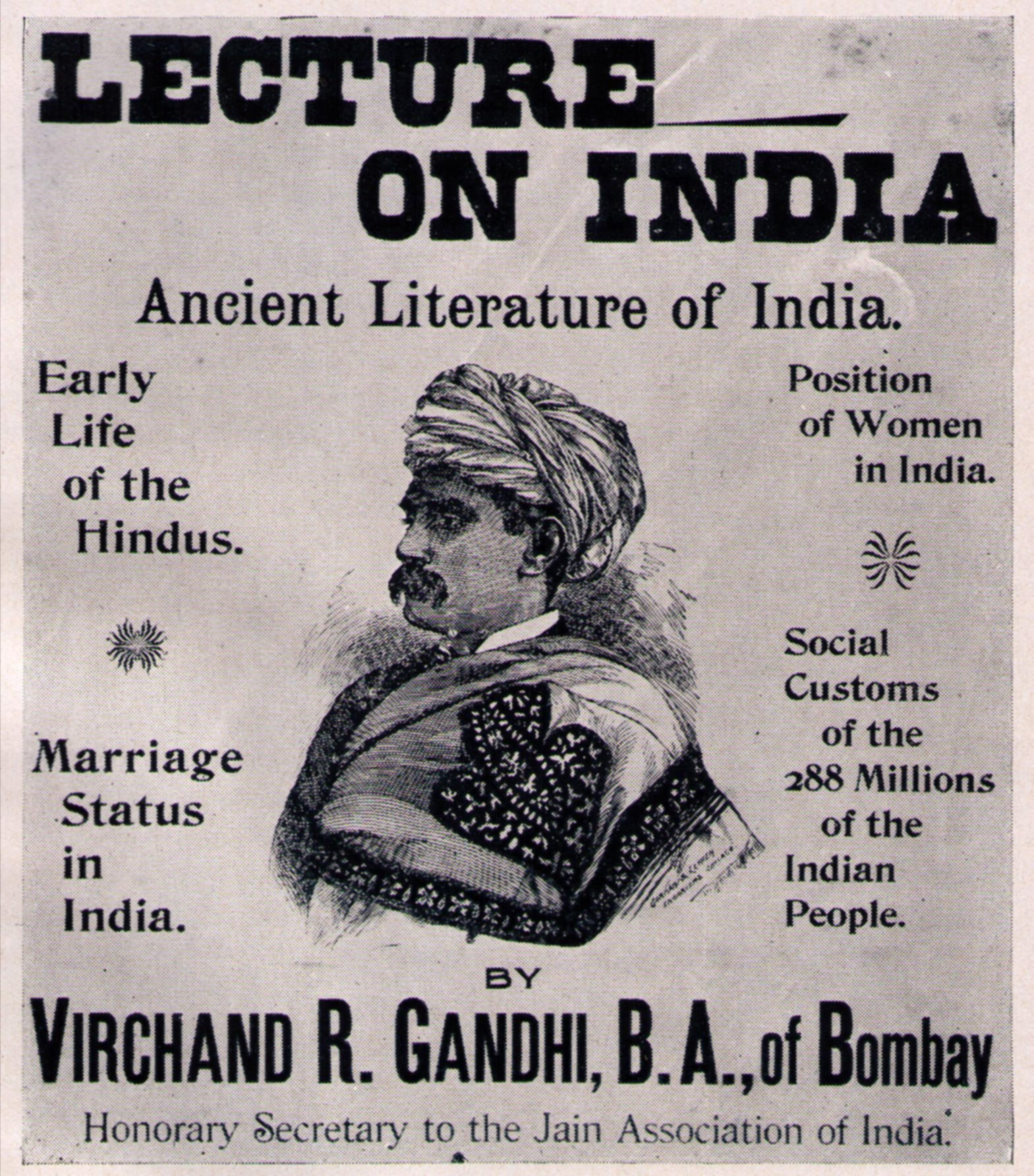
Virchand Gandhi poster for presentation at the Parliament of the World's Religionsin Chicago in 1893

Virchand Gandhi made a presentation of Jainism at the Parliament of the World's Religions in Chicago in 1893, marking one of the earliest appearances of Jainism outside India. The World Jain Congress was held in Leicester in 1988.

- Jainism in Europe
- Jainism in Canada
- Jainism in the United States
- Jainism in Australia
- Jainism in Southeast Asia
- Jainism in East Africa - One of the oldest Jain overseas diaspora. Their number was estimated at 45,000 at the independence of the East African countries in the early 1960s. Most members of the diaspora belonged to Gujarati speaking Halari Visa Oshwal Jain community originally from the Jamnagar area of Saurashtra.
- Jainism in West Africa

== Socio-economic profile ==
=== Education and wealth ===
The Jain community has the highest literacy rate of any religious community in India. The 2011 census recorded a Jain literacy rate of 94.9%, far exceeding the national average of 74.04%. This high literacy extends to women, with the female literacy rate among Jains being 92.1%, compared to a national female average of 65.46%.

Jains are also the wealthiest community in India. Data from the National Family Health Survey (NFHS-4) in 2018 revealed that 70% of Jains were in the highest wealth quintile of the country.

=== Medieval and early modern commerce ===
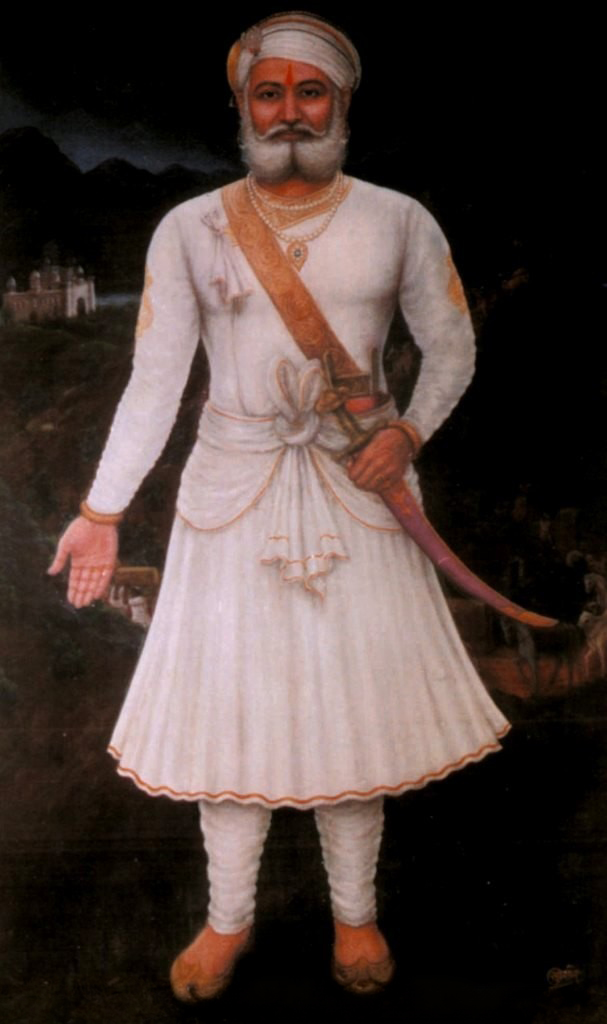
Bhama Shah of Mewar, Rajasthan, who financed Maharana Pratap's military campaigns against the Mughal Empire

Scholars attribute this distinct socio-economic profile to the rigorous application of core Jain ethical principles. The strict interpretation of non-violence ethically prohibited Jain laypersons from engaging in professions that harmed living beings, such as agriculture or military service. Consequently, the community historically gravitated toward trade, mercantile banking, and gemology.

During the medieval period, Jain merchants like the 13th-century shipping magnate Jagadu Shah amassed vast fortunes through maritime trade and utilized their wealth for extensive public works and famine relief. In the 16th century, the Oswal Jain merchant and minister Bhamashah famously financed Maharana Pratap's military campaigns against the Mughal Empire with his immense personal fortune.

During the Mughal era, Jain bankers and merchants wielded immense political and economic influence. In the 17th century, Shantidas Jhaveri (c. 1590s–1659) served as the paramount jeweler and financier to the Mughal court. During the same period, the Jain merchant Virji Vora of Surat was recognized as one of the wealthiest men in the world, extensively financing the British East India Company.

Banarasidas, a 17th-century Shrimal Jain merchant, authored the Ardhakathanak, providing historians with a rare, detailed autobiographical account of Jain mercantile networks in early modern India. By the 18th century, the Jagat Seth family—notably Fateh Chand and Mahtab Chand—became the most powerful banking house in Bengal, effectively controlling the regional economy and royal mints.

=== Industrial and modern financial leadership ===
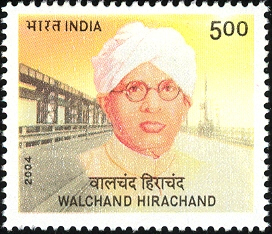
Walchand Hirachand on 2004 stamp of India

During the 19th and 20th centuries, Jain merchants played a pioneering role in India's transition from traditional banking to modern industry. In the 19th century, Premchand Roychand emerged as a dominant financier and became a founding member of the Bombay Stock Exchange. In the early 20th century, Walchand Hirachand pioneered the Indian shipping, aviation, and automobile industries.

In Gujarat, textile and pharmaceutical manufacturing were heavily driven by Jain industrial families, most notably Ambalal Sarabhai and Kasturbhai Lalbhai, the latter founding Arvind Mills. The Dalmia-Jain group, led by Ramkrishna Dalmia and Sahu Shanti Prasad Jain, built a massive conglomerate that included The Times of India media empire. In the technology and agriculture sectors, figures like Narendra Patni, who pioneered India's IT services export industry, and Bhavarlal Jain, who revolutionized micro-irrigation systems, established significant modern enterprises.

This prominent economic legacy continues in the contemporary era, with Jain billionaires such as Gautam Adani of the Adani Group and Dilip Shanghvi of Sun Pharmaceutical, Sudhir and Samir Mehta of the Torrent Group, and real estate developer Mangal Prabhat Lodha leading major global conglomerates.

=== Philanthropy and Patronage ===
The Jain community's approach to wealth is shaped by the principle of non-attachment (Aparigraha), one of the five main vows. This ethic encourages limiting one's possessions and viewing accumulated wealth not as a personal end, but as a resource to be used for the welfare of all living beings (jīva-dayā).

This principle, combined with the tradition of charity (Dāna), has resulted in a long and well-documented history of philanthropy. The community is known for funding and managing public institutions, including schools, hospitals, and, most notably, panjrapoles—extensive animal sanctuaries that care for sick, injured, and aged animals, reflecting the ethic of Ahimsa.

This tradition also extended to the patronage of art and architecture. Unlike many of India's great monuments commissioned by kings or emperors, some of the most intricate Jain temples were funded by wealthy lay merchants and ministers. The most famous examples are the Dilwara Temples at Mount Abu, commissioned by the minister Vimal Shah, and the Ranakpur Jain Temple, funded by a local merchant. This practice of translating personal wealth into timeless public art and spiritual merit is a hallmark of the community's socio-economic legacy.

This philanthropic tradition also served as a primary vehicle for preserving India's broader cultural and literary heritage. Wealthy Jain merchants historically funded and maintained manuscript libraries (jnana bhandaras) across Western India, which successfully preserved tens of thousands of ancient Jain, Hindu, and secular secular texts from destruction during medieval political upheavals. Furthermore, their architectural patronage went beyond individual shrines to create massive, fortified sacred temple-cities, such as Palitana and Girnar, which remain central to India's architectural heritage. The community's continuous financial support for monastic scholars also fundamentally shaped the classical development of several regional Indian languages, particularly Kannada, Apabhramsha, and Gujarati.

== See also ==
- Legal status of Jainism as a distinct religion in India
- List of Jains
- Sarak
