= Jainism in Japan =

Japanese Jains
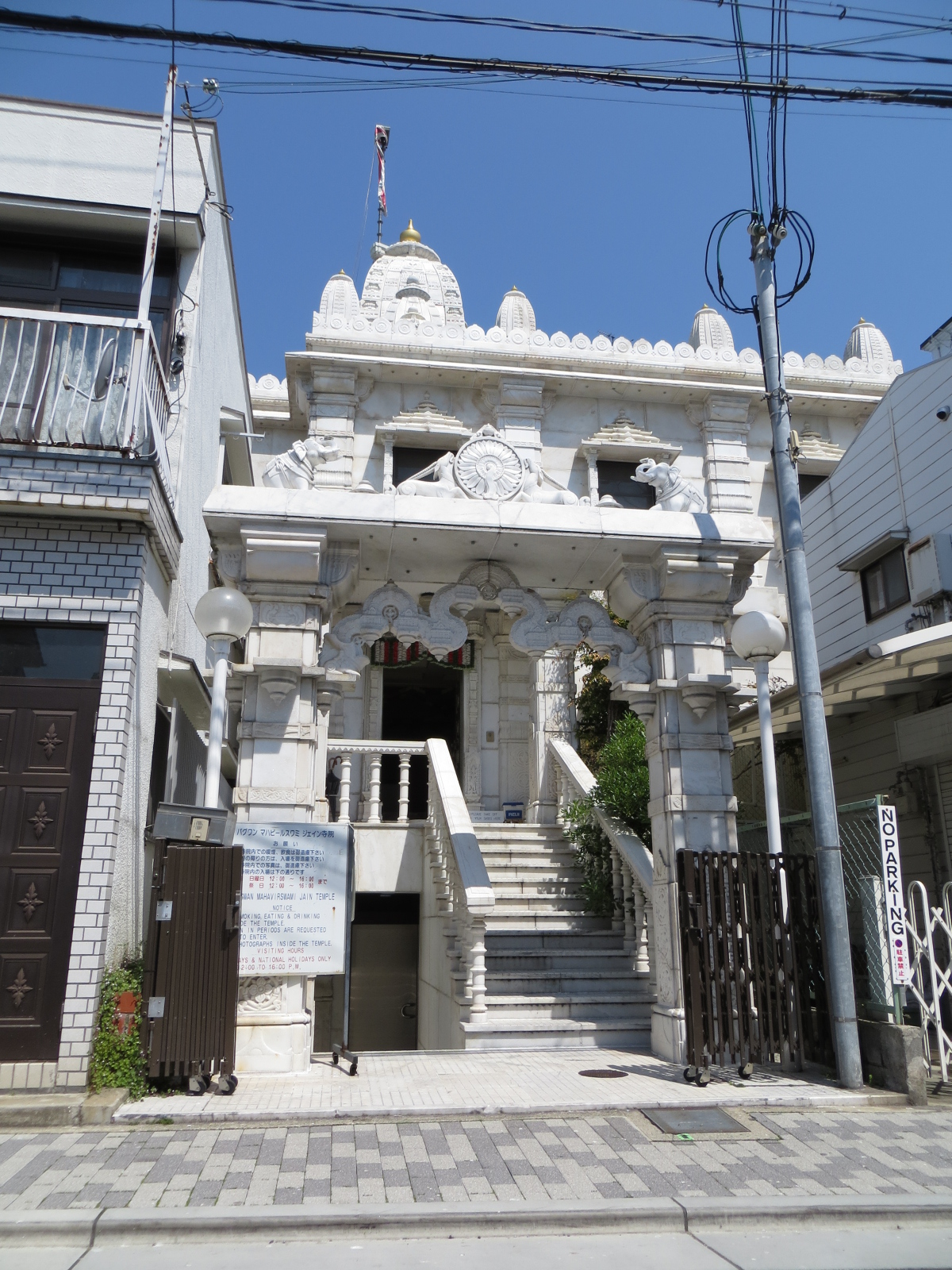
- Mahavir swami Jain Temple in Kobe

Languages
- Japanese Languages; Indian Languages

Religion
- Jainism

Jainism, unlike the closely related Buddhism, is a minority religion in Japan. At present, there are three Jain temples in Japan.

== See also ==
- Jainism in Canada
- Jainism in Europe
- Jainism in Hong Kong
- Jainism in Singapore
- Jainism in the United States
