= Jainism in Australia =

Australian Jains
Total population
- 5,851

Regions with significant populations

Languages
- English; Indian Languages

Religion
- Jainism

The history of Jainism in Australia is relatively short when compared to the history of Christianity on the same continent. There are four Jain centres in Australia. The Jain population in Australia was counted in the 2016 census to be 4,047, of whom 38% lived in Greater Sydney, 31% in Greater Melbourne, and 15% in Greater Perth. The states and territories with the highest proportion of Jains are Western Australia (0.025%) and Victoria (0.022%), whereas those with the lowest are Queensland (0.006%) and Tasmania (0.001%). As per the latest census (2021), the Jain population in Australia is 5,851, which is a 44.5% increase between 2016-2021.

== History ==
The Jain community established itself in Australia through immigration. A Jain society has been formed in Sydney.

Exodus of Asians from Uganda in 1972 due to Idi Amin's policies, forced some Jains to migrate elsewhere, like Australia.

== Jain Centres ==
Jain centres and/or societies have been established in Sydney, Perth, Brisbane, Canberra, Adelaide, and Melbourne. Most of the centres practice Jain unity by making sure every Jain sect comes and prays together. The first two Jain Tirthankars in Australia were established in Hindu temples in Sydney and in Canberra. First Jain association in Australia was formed in Sydney and named Sydney Jain Mandal. Another Jain association in Sydney is known as Vitraag Jain Shwetambar Sangh There is also a community-driven centre — AAJ (meaning 'Today' in Hindi) that serves Jain community in Australia.

== See also ==
- List of Jain temples
- Jainism in Europe
- Jainism in Hong Kong
- Jainism in India
- Jainism in the United States
