= Terapanth =

Terapanth or Tera Panth may refer to:

- Digambara Terapanth, a sect of the Digambara tradition of Jainism
- Śvetāmbara Terapanth, a sect of Śvetāmbara Jainism

== See also ==
- Taran Panth, another Digambar Jain sect, should not be confused with Terapanth
