= Jainism in Southeast Asia =

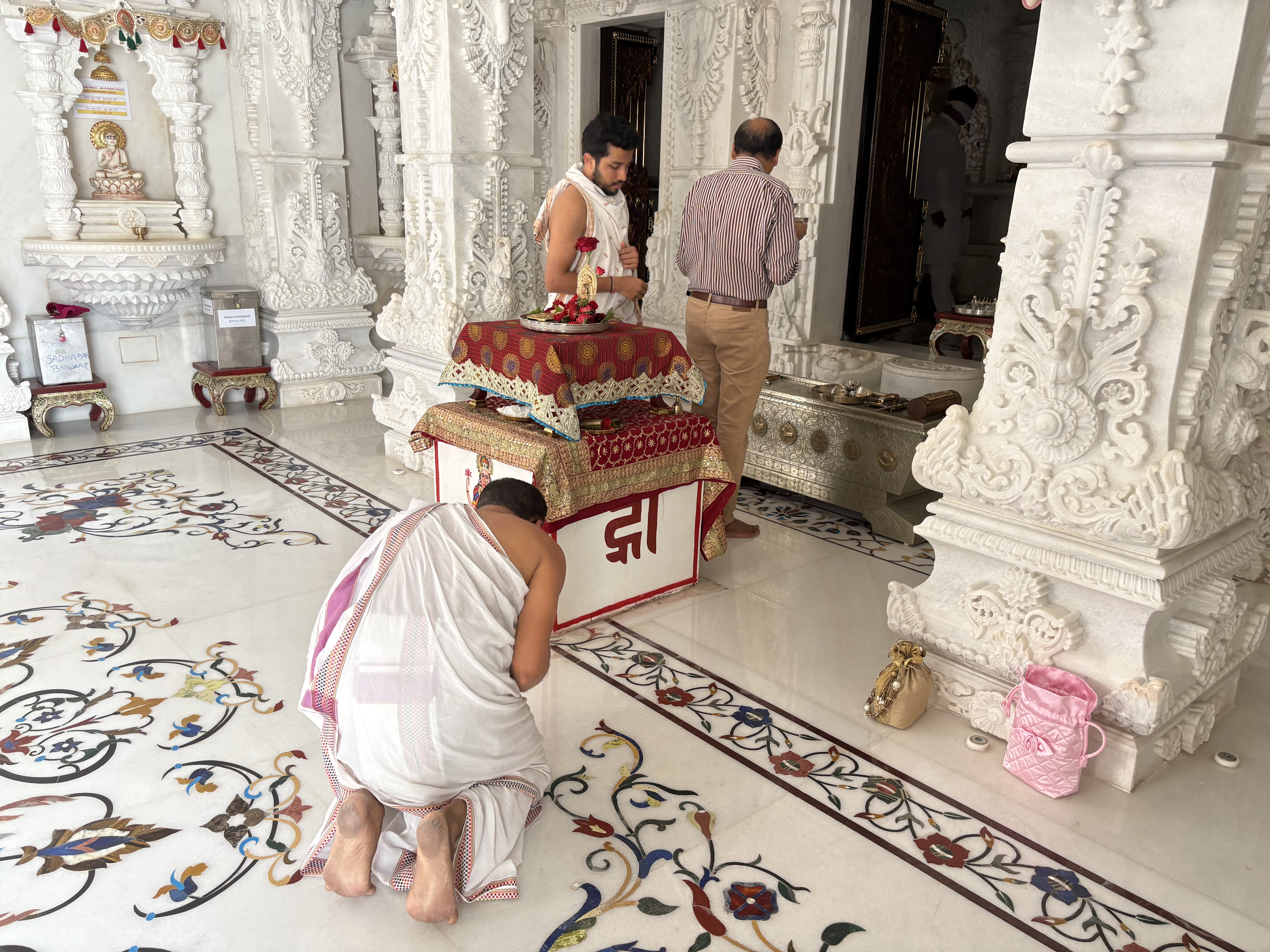
Shree Shitalnath Jain Temple
Bangkok, Thailand

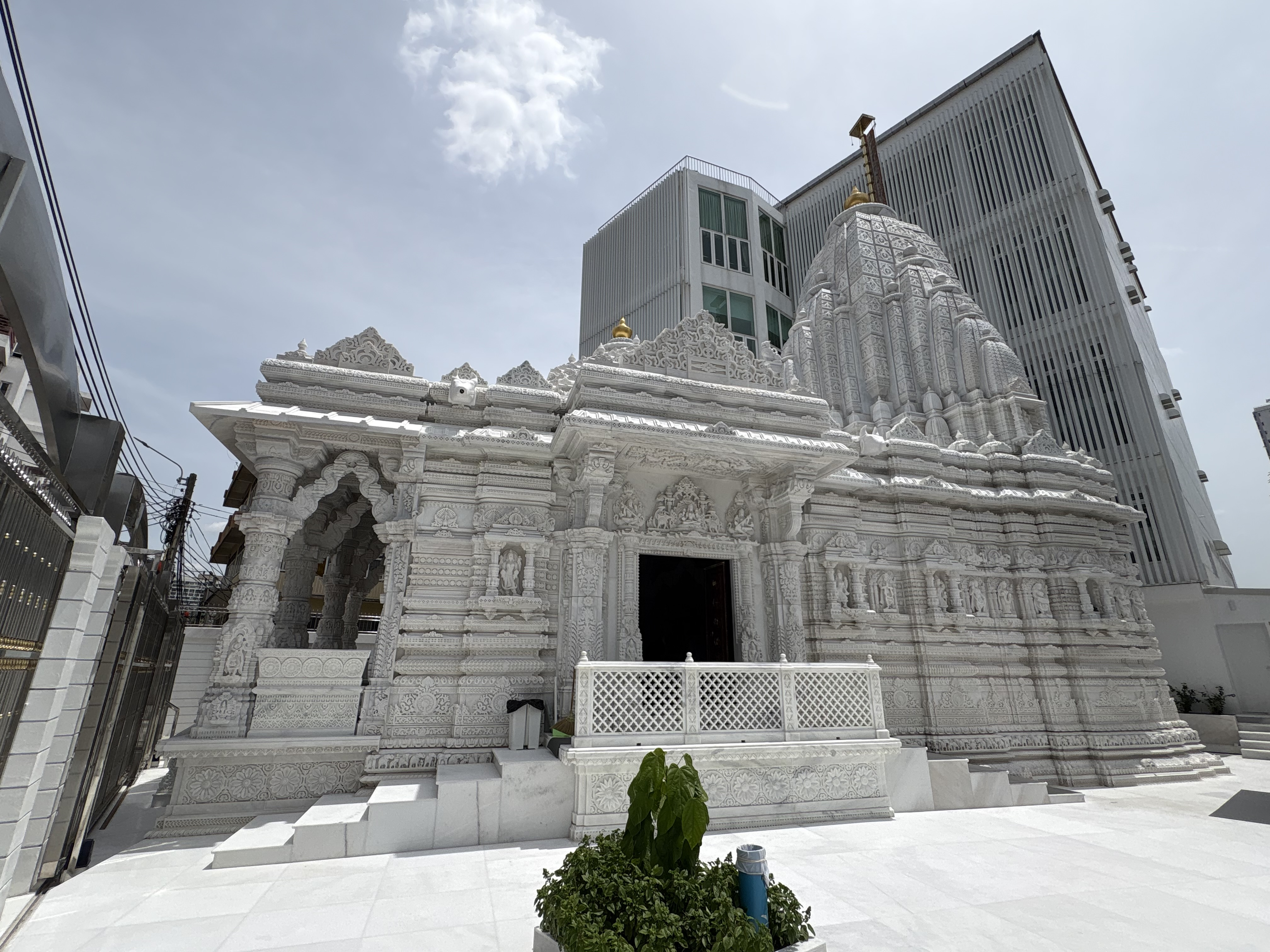
Shree Shitalnath Jain Temple
Bangkok, Thailand

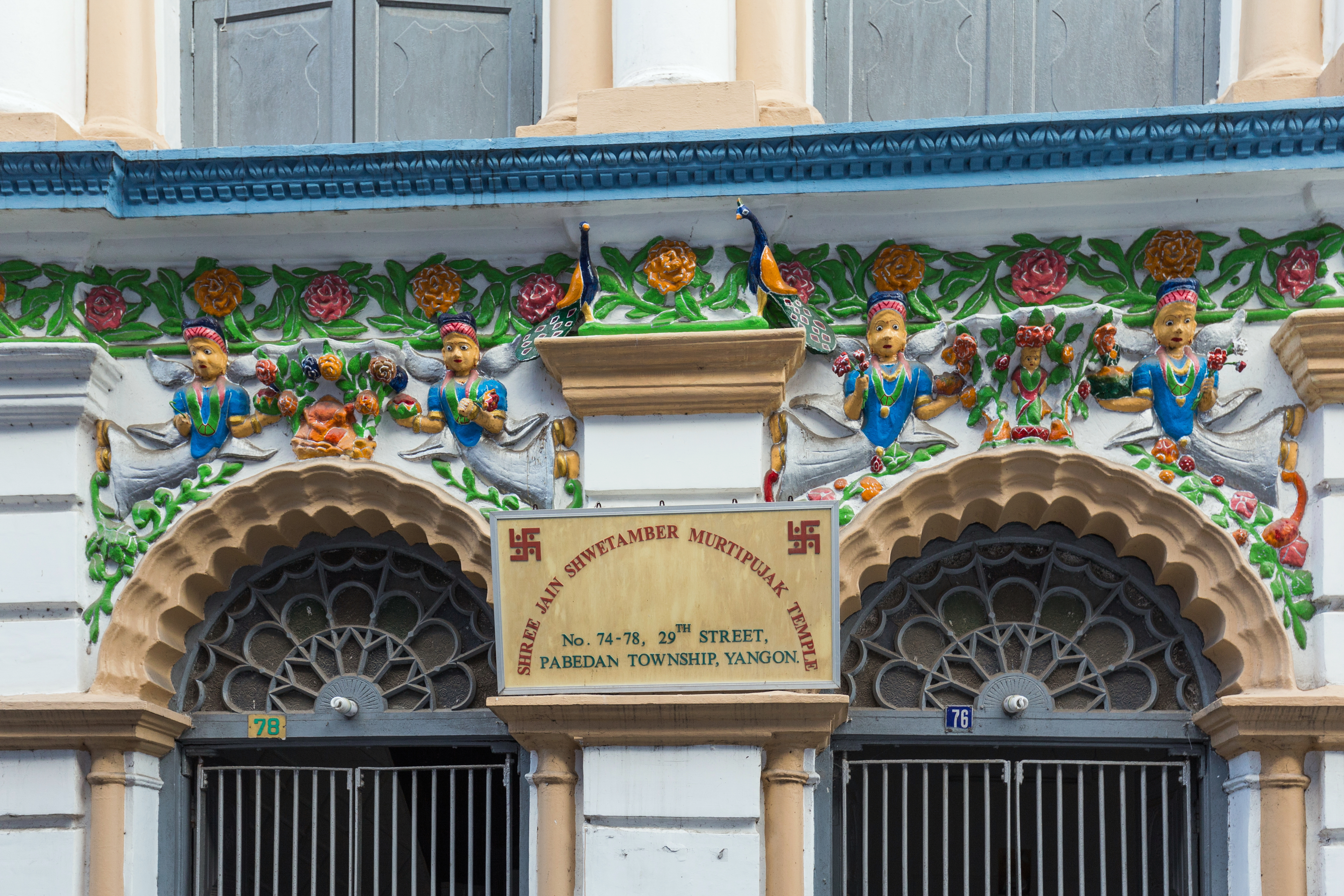
Shree Jain Shwetamber Murtipujak Temple
Yangon, Myanmar

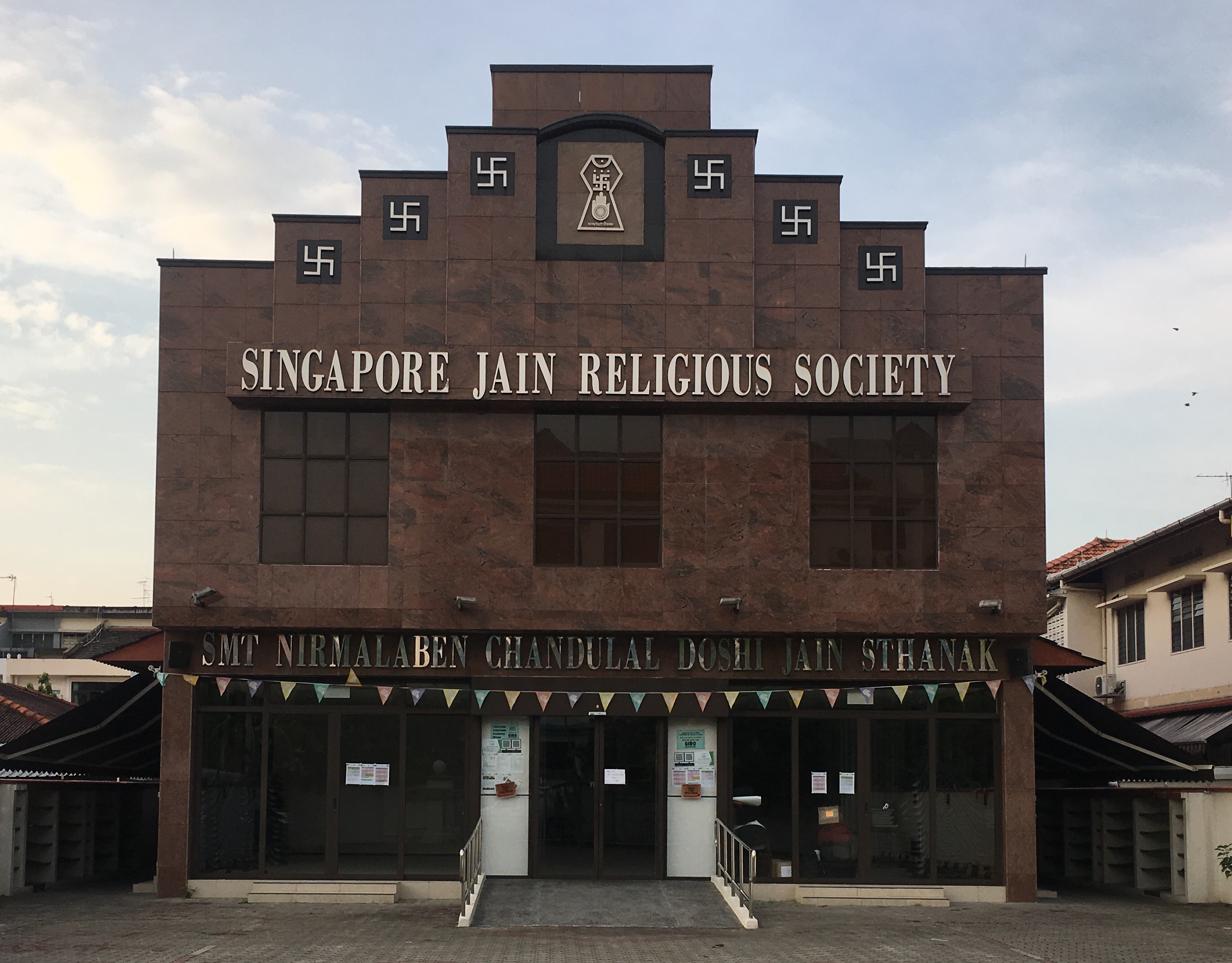
Singapore Jain Religious Society
Singapore

There are select references to Southeast Asia in Jain literature. Suvarṇabhūmi or, "The Golden Land" is speculated to be referring to Southeast Asia as geographical landmark. As, this term can be found in texts such as Harivamsa, Uttara, and Ādi Purāṇas.

Prominent Jains (e.g., Jain monk Kshullaka Prayatna Sagar) from India have visited South East Asia for the purpose of representing Jainism and to guide the local Jain community. As well as, fostering connections with other non-Jain individuals of the region(s).

== Regions ==
=== Myanmar (Burma) ===
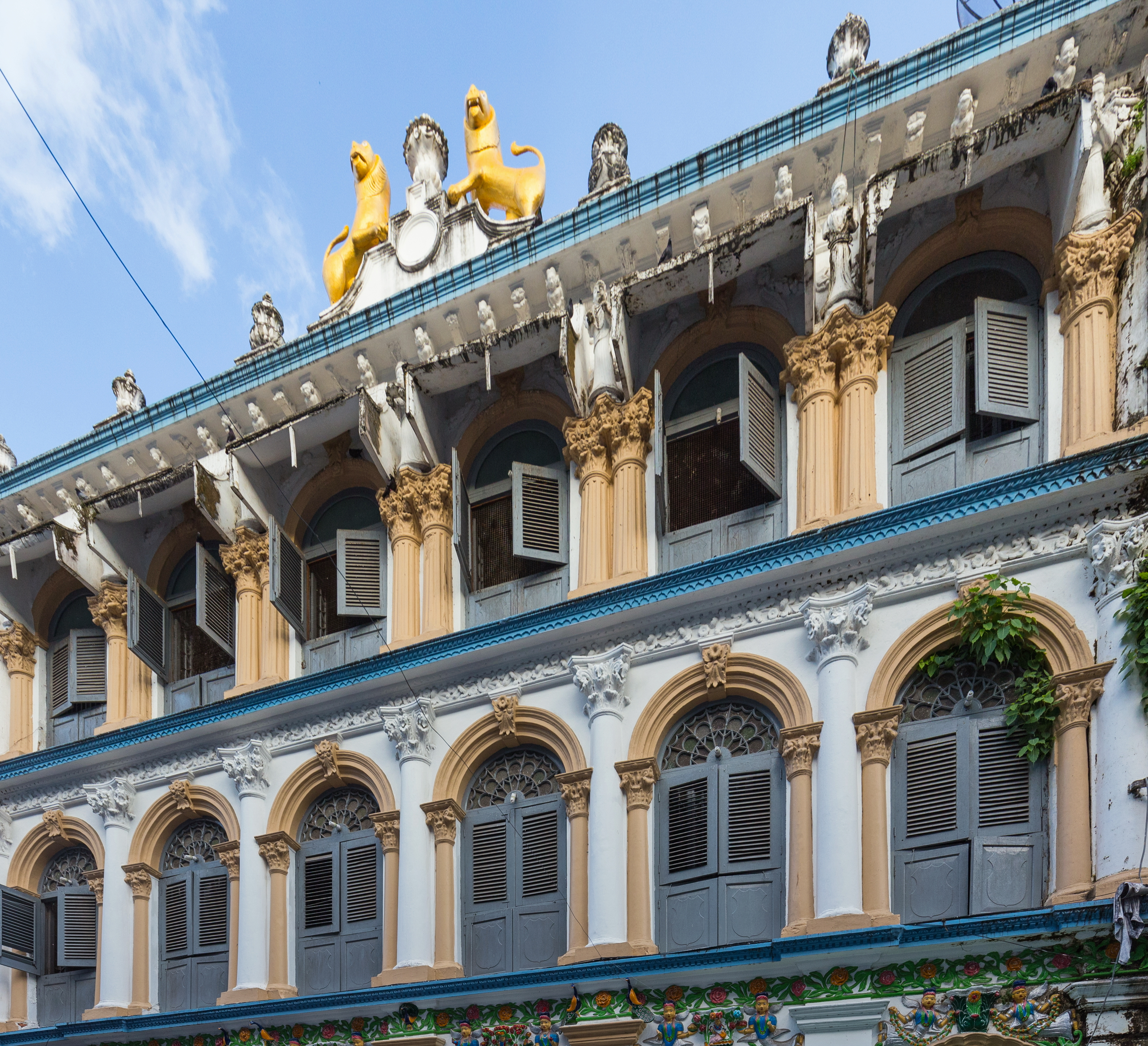
Shree Jain Shwetamber Murtipujak Temple, Yangon, Myanmar

Prior to the mass exodus of Burmese-Indians in 1942, estimates place the Jain community in Myanmar at up to ~5,000 families, though some figures from the period reach as high as ~10,000 individuals across sources. The present day population of Jains residing in Myanmar is difficult to measure. However, in Yangon there is a Jain temple (The Shree Jain Shwetamber Murtipujak Temple) that was established in 1914; which continues to serve the local community. The temple exterior displays pillars and a variety of religious carvings; blending Jain and Burmese design. The Yangon Heritage Trust has been lobbying to preserve this temple, along with other prominent landmarks of Old Rangoon.

=== Hong Kong ===
As of 2009, there are ~500 Jain families residing in Hong Kong. Currently, there is one temple, "Shri Jain Sangh Hong Kong" founded in 1996 which serves the Jain community of Hong Kong.

=== Indonesia ===
A small Jain community exists in Indonesia, mostly in Jakarta and Medan. The community organizes various Jain festivals in Jakarta. The community organization is called Jain Social Group, Indonesia.

=== Malaysia ===
There are about 2,500 Jains in Malaysia. It is believed some of them came to Malacca in the 15th or 16th century.

The first Jain temple in Malaysia is located at Ipoh, Perak and was consecrated in 2012. There is also a Jain temple in Kuala Lumpur. The temple is located in the Bangsar locality of Kuala Lumpur and was built using 4000 kilograms of marble from India. Malaysia's Human Resources Minister Subramaniam Sathasivam was present during the inauguration of the temple in 2011.

The Jain community actively celebrates Jain festivals like Paryushan.

=== Philippines ===
A small Jain community resides in the country, most are Indian expatriates and live within or around Manila.

=== Singapore ===
Jains have been settled in Singapore since just before the First World War (1910 – 1914). As of 2006, there were 1,000 Jains in Singapore.

=== Thailand ===
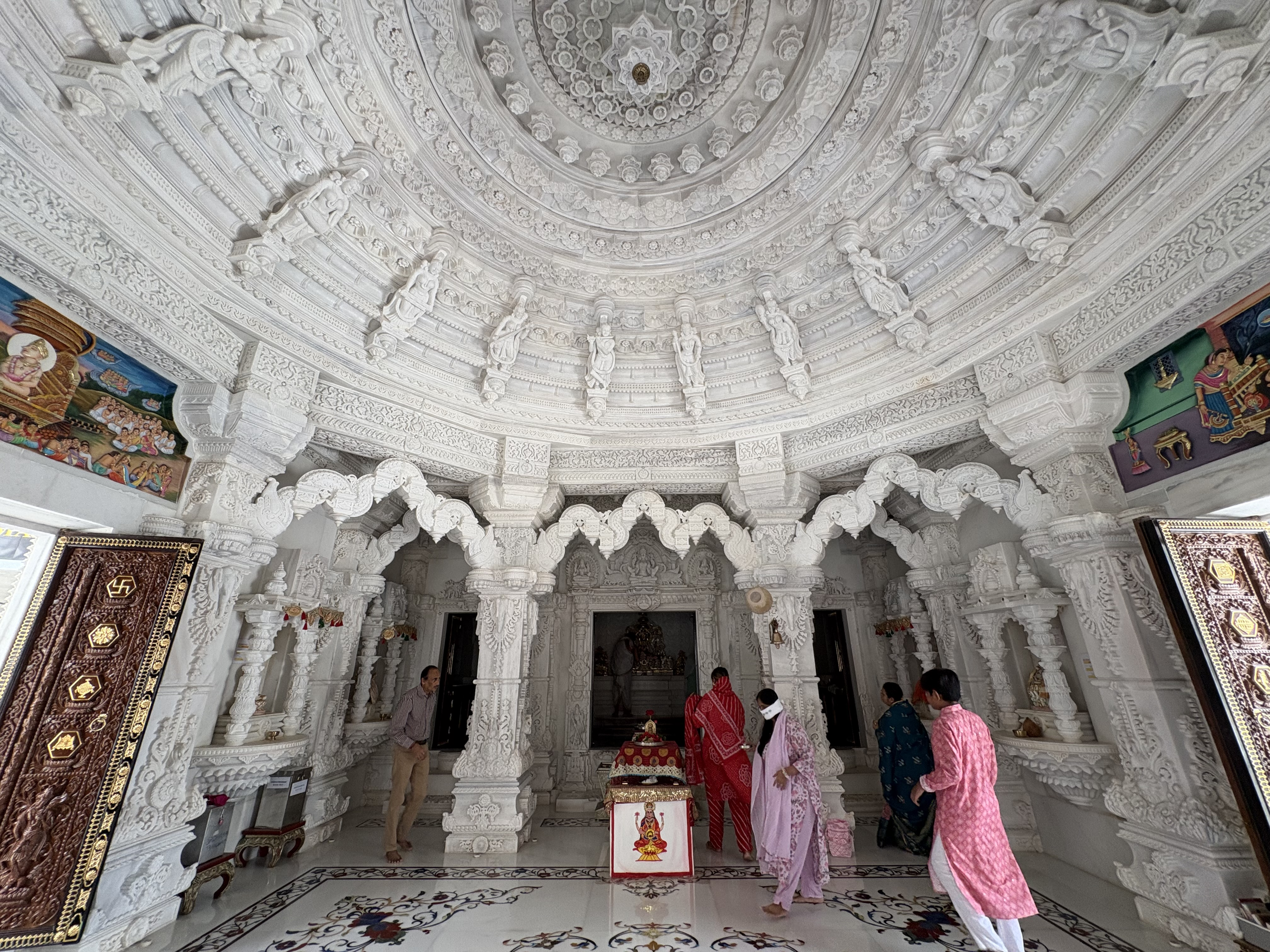
Shree Shitalnath Jain Temple in Khet Yan Nawa, Bangkok

Historically, Jain monks took Jain images to Thailand via Sri Lanka. A digambar Jain image is worshiped as an image of Buddha at Chiangmai. However, due to a rigid emphasis on austerity, Jainism did not take root in Thailand.

As of 2011, there are about 600 Jain families in Thailand, mainly in Bangkok. The Jain community in Thailand in not united, unlike the Jain communities in Singapore, the United States, and some other countries. Separate Jain temples exist for the Digambara and the Svetmabara Jain communities. The Digambar Jain Foundation was established in 2007.

The Jain community also sponsors local Thai PhD students to pursue higher studies in Jainism. Some restaurants in Thailand serve Jain food.

A majority of the diamond cutting and polishing business in Bangkok is handled by the Jain community.

== See also ==
- Indian religions
  - Hinduism in Southeast Asia
  - Jainism in the United States
  - Jainism in the United Kingdom
  - Jainism in Africa
