= Sexual differences in Jainism =

The global Jain community is broadly divided into 2 major lineages/sects (and related sub-lineages) whose differences trace back to the practices of ascetics. These include the Digambara, meaning "sky-clad", sect based on the nudity of male monks, and the Śvetāmbara, or "white-clad", sect referring to a simple white fabric worn by both male and female ascetics. Both of the groups share largely the same cosmology, belief structure, and ethical outlook, but differ in some aspects of practice.

== Debates on women ==
One of the most fundamental distinctions between Śvetāmbara and Digambara Jains is their respective views on women as mendicants, or nuns, that originated over their debates regarding nudity. The general consensus between the two sects is that the Jinas, and especially the last Tīrthaṅkara Mahāvīra, practiced naked asceticism. Digambara Jains claims that it is necessary for all mendicants to conduct their renunciation without clothing. For them, this represents the idealized practice of aparigraha, or non-attachment, in which a mendicant renounces all property and possessions, including clothing. Śvetāmbara Jains, however, claim that nudity as the exemplary mode of asceticism is impossible in this period of the cosmic age, and as such, it is "deemed inappropriate". For the Śvetāmbaras, the white robes commonly associated with them are not a source of attachment, but merely interpreted as tools that enable the religious life of restraint

The debate on nudity would translate into a concern about the renunciant and soteriological potential of women. For Digambaras, since women cannot be fully nude, which was seen as "an essential component of the path to liberation", their renunciation was only partial. Moreover, many Jain texts describe women as unsuited toward mendicant life due to their being inherently weaker, passion-filled, and because their physical bodies "generate and destroy life-forms within their sexual organs ... thus repeatedly infringing nonviolence". Women's breasts, underarms, menstruation, and vaginas, were described in some early mendicants debates as the source of killing innumerable living beings, and this inherent violence meant that women were exempt from spiritual liberation because their bodies consistently broke the cardinal rule of ahiṃsā. The Śvetāmbaras also accepted the premise that naked nuns would be inappropriate; however, because they viewed clothing as auxiliary to religious pursuits, the issue of female mendicants was resolved by having all individuals wear simple white robes. Śvetāmbara Jains argued that women were not exempt from spiritual liberation, given that there is nothing within Jain scriptures that precludes such.

The debates haunt the discussion of gender, and particularly women, in Jainism, as the mendicant tradition is seen as one of the most significant features of Jain religious practice and its embodied philosophy. Yet, simply because the Śvetāmbaras do not preclude spiritual liberation for women, women can still by viewed in both positive and negative ways - as shown by the Jain literary tradition.

The scripture states that Uttara, Sivabhuti (Founder of Digambara sect as per Śvetāmbara)'s sister, adopted nudity and joined him. However, society thought of her as a prostitute, so Sivabhuti prevented nuns from staying nude. The courtesans of the town believed that nobody would come to them if they saw women in such a state. A condition was enforced that since women possess clothes in the Digambara tradition, they are not fit to attain Moksha or liberation. This aligns with the current-day Digambara belief regarding women attaining salvation.

== Perception of women in Jainism ==
As sociologist Manisha Sethi observes: "There is no single archetype but a heterogeneity of ideals that appear sometimes to buttress women's claim to independent spiritual life, and at other times, to erode this pursuit." Sethi's point illuminates the fact that the broader Jain literary tradition has stories that both inspire and demonize Jain nuns and laywomen.

=== Jain Goddesses ===
Within Jainism there are goddess beings such as the yakṣī snake goddess Padmāvatī, who can intercede on behalf of "the non-salvational needs of their Jaina devotees, needs which cannot be met by the aloof, unresponsive, and totally-transcendent Tīrthaṅkaras". Sethi notes that there are a hierarchy of three categories of Jain goddesses. At the top are goddesses who reside in the top realm (urdhvaloka), for example, Vedic goddesses Saraswati and Lakshmi. In the middle are goddesses who reside in the middle realm (madhyaloka). These are Tantrik vidyadevis. Yakṣīs like in the lower realm (adholoka).

=== Revered Jain Women ===
There are also stories about early Jain women whose chastity and righteousness eventually lead to their liberation, such as Rājīmatī, wife of the 22nd Tīrthaṅkara Neminātha. When getting changed in a cave, Rajimati is unaware that her brother-in-law, Rathanemi, was meditating in the same cave. Seeing her naked, Rathanemi is overcome with sexual desire. Rajimati successfully convinces him to maintain his observance of chastity rather than succumb to his desires. She is thus revered for preventing 'the moral downfall and spiritual degradation' of Rathanemi, an ascetic.

Sethi states that Chandabala is the 'most feted' of all Jain female renunciants as the first initiate of Mahavira.

Additionally, Mayna Sundari, a Jain princess devoted to the Goddess Chakreshvari, is also revered. Through her piety and austerities she is said to have cured her husband of leprosy.

=== Women as obstacles ===
Yet at the same time, women - be they laywomen or nuns - are sometimes viewed in texts as sexual temptresses with nefarious goals. Indeed, while Jain monks are meant to control their sexual desires via their ascetic practices, the Sūtṛakrtāṅga-sūtra details how "a woman will tempt [a monk] to a comfortable couch or bed" by seductive means. Women are sometimes presented in texts as cat-like predators who prevent Jain monks from achieving their lofty spiritual goals. Unlike their lay counterparts, references to Jain nuns within the texts about monastic conduct are notably absent. This lack of representation of female mendicants in the textual tradition, argues Sethi, is an act of historic erasure that denies women equal opportunity in renunciate activities and leaves the Jain spiritual worldview solely within the domain of male practitioners. Ironically, while nuns are sometimes characterized as being dangerous sexual agents in Jain texts, the same women must also protect their chastity from "potential molesters and rapists as well as her own self".

Still, in spite of these negative representations of women, there remain many other examples of women as heroic mothers, wise and nonviolent goddesses, and chaste exemplars within the literary tradition that offers an alternative, and positive, vision of women within Jainism.

== Mallī/Mallinātha ==
Among the numerous figures within Jain texts, an important discussion is to be had regarding the 19th Tīrthaṅkara Mallinātha, who represents a unique case study in the debates and figurations of Jain women. For Śvetāmbara Jains, Mallinātha represents the capacity of women to achieve spiritual liberation, given that Mallinātha is depicted as a woman known as Mallī Devi. Mallī was a king in her previous life known as Mahā-bala, who, along with his six friends, decided to become a mendicant after hearing an ascetic preach. They all agreed to fast together, but Mahā-bala secretly desired to outperform his friends in their fasts. After they completed the life-ending fast known as sallekhanā, Mahā-bala's friends were reborn as gods and then kings; however, Mahā-bala was reborn as a woman because of his deceitful desire to be better than his friends, which is considered to be a characteristic of women. Thus, despite the fact that Mallī rises to the occasion of Tīrthaṅkara, her gender is still a karmic defect or failure unlike the case of male Tīrthaṅkaras. Digambara Jains reject the view that Mallinātha was a woman, as this would mean that he would have developed breasts and menstruated, both of which are sources of great violence that would prevent any Jina-to-be from shedding all karmas. The exact gender of Mallinātha is more complicated than this, as all but one Śvetāmbara image – "The 'Meditating Female'", which is a 10th–11th century image from Uttar Pradesh, actually represents Mallī as an "asexual being with the absence of the diacritical [accent] marks of her sex". In terms of Mallinātha's presence in the lives of Jain nuns and laywomen, Sethi observes that very few view Mallinātha as a role model for women, and in the Śvetāmbaras' case, "her presence in the Tīrthaṅkara pantheon [was] 'an exception and a wonderment' ... likely to be never repeated again".

== Roles of women in Jainism ==
According to the Kalpa-sūtra, after the death of the Tīrthaṅkara Mahāvīra, the community that he organized "contained a body of female ascetics two and half times as large as the number of male ascetics". Further, the respected Candanbālā, a Jain female renouncer during the time of Mahāvīra, is said to have led a sangha of 36,000 female ascetics. These annotations highlight the fact that, while there was lively discussion and debate regarding female mendicants, women have been a part of the Jain monastic tradition for a long time, which was not always the case with rival communities. Women have continued to play important roles in the Jain tradition even unto modern times, where Sethi observes that the number of female ascetics within Jainism is far greater than that of male ascetics.

Arguably, given that Jainism offers the possibility of liberation to women, women are seen as "legitimate aspirants and agents of salvation", where in other traditions - such as views of women in Hindusim or women in Buddhism - this is not always the case. Despite the propensity of female ascetics in Jainism, this does not ignore the fact that aspiring mendicant women may still find themselves within a hierarchical system wherein male ascetics are viewed more positively. This is to say, the Jain mendicant hierarchy "is structured through the gendered ideology of domesticity, with the patriarchal authority, consolidated in the figure of the ācārya/gacchādhipati, presiding over" the various mendicant orders. Thus, the highest rank of female mendicants fails to have the same prestige or recognition as the highest rank of male mendicants, the ācārya. Female ācāryas are a theoretical possibility, and two mendicant groups in the 1970s are known to be the exceptional cases where women have been given this status rank.

== Gender and the third sex ==
One of the consequences of debating whether or not women could be mendicants was an inquiry made by the Jains regarding who was a part of their larger community. To wit, the Jains accepted the pan-Indian idea of a third sex, who existed on the fringes of the wider Indian society; however, given that the Jains were investigating whether or not women could become mendicants or attain spiritual liberation, they were simultaneously concerned about what it meant to be a man, woman, or neither/both.

The Jains rejected the Brahmanical view of gender as indicated by "the presence or absence of certain primary and secondary characteristics" and instead, Jain texts "revalorized" the term veda, which referred to both biological sex and sexual feelings. What became important to the Jains was less the features or markers of gender, but rather, sexual behavior itself as seen by one's role in intercourse. This sexual behavior can be focused toward men, women, or both sexes, and it is exactly this bisexual quality of the third sex that was accepted by Śvetāmbara and Digambara Jains. However, the bisexuality of the third-sex became accepted not as an identity in itself, but rather, as a third form of sexual desire that can be possessed by male, female, or third-sex gendered people. That is, a biological female could have male, female, or third-sex desire, and likewise for biological males or intersex individuals. Thus, by the 5th century, the Jains distinguished what they viewed as biological sex and psychological desire/sexuality, which allowed the possibility of "a biological male (dravyapuruṣa) [that] need not necessarily be a male psychologically (bhāvapuruṣa), that is, endowed with male sexuality [desire], but he may in fact experience female or third-sex sexuality [desire], and the same will be true, mutatis mutandis, for the two other sexes as well".

The third-sex, known as napuṃsaka, was an important consideration because there was a social stigma attached to such individuals. As Leonard Zwilling and Michael J. Sweet explain, the fear was that the broader populace would make incorrect assumptions about Jain mendicants if the napuṃsakas were ordained as monks or even if mendicants accepted alms from them. Thus, another reason why it was important to determine who was a part of the third-sex was to enforce mendicant conduct and public opinion. However, over time, this ban grew lax, especially if third-sex people were especially well-connected to local people or they were seen as being especially able to control their sexuality; such third-sex individuals could participate in mendicant life or even serve as doctors for mendicants.
