= Jainism in Africa =

African Jains
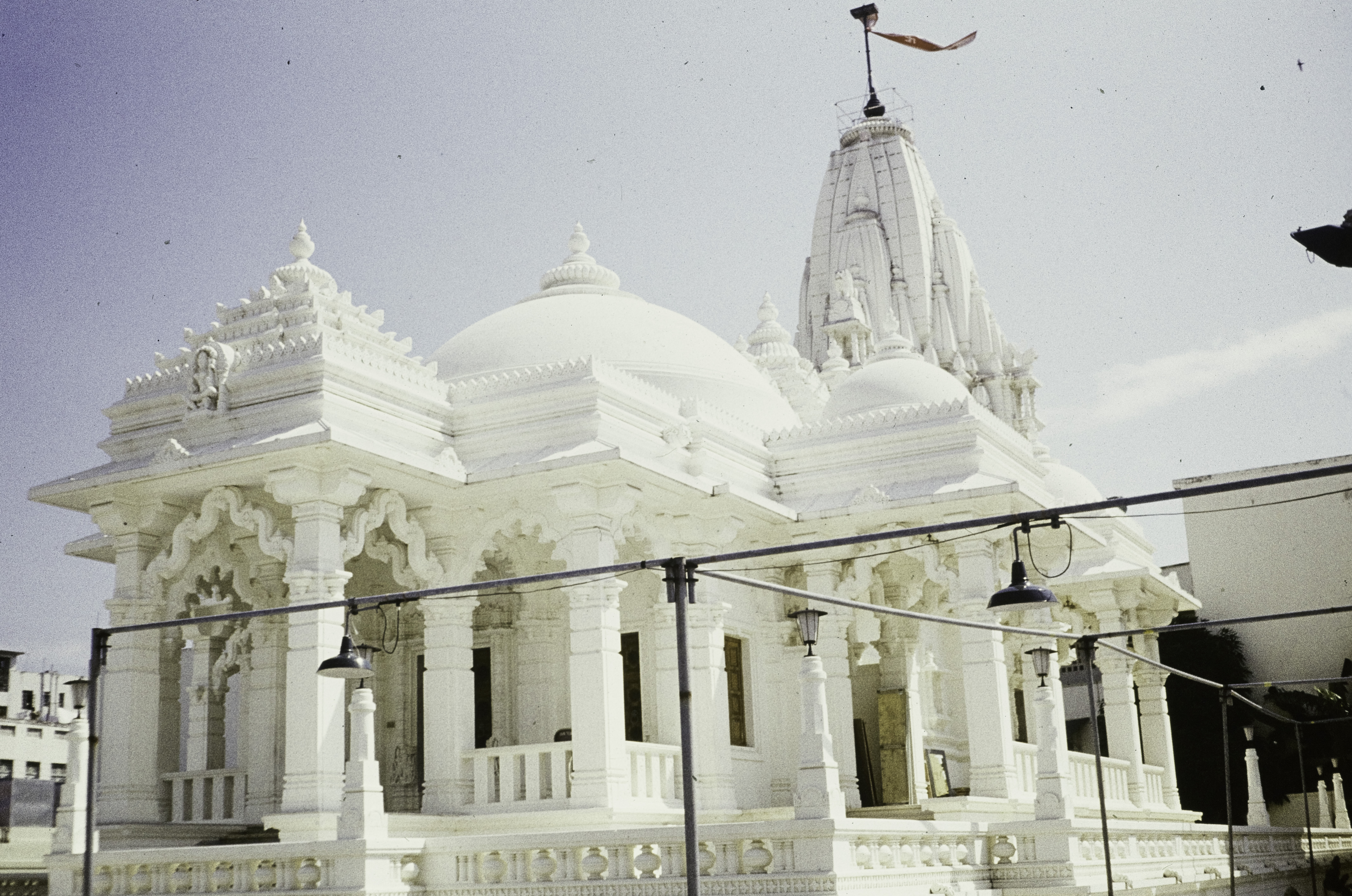
- Jain temple, Mombasa

Total population
- 20,000

Regions with significant populations

Languages
- African Languages; Indian Languages

Religion
- Jainism

The history of Jainism in Africa is relatively short when compared with the histories of Judaism, Christianity and Islam on the same continent. There are about 20,000 Jains and around 10 Jain organizations in Africa.

== History ==
Jainism entered Africa during the late 19th century, when Jains first emigrated from India to Kenya, and then to Uganda, Sudan and Tanzania.

An exodus of Asians from Uganda in 1972 due to Idi Amin's policies forced some Jains to migrate elsewhere, like Australia, North America and Europe.

== Jainism in Kenya ==
Jainism in Kenya has been present for about 100 years. It is practiced by a small community that actively organizes Jain conventions, film festivals and other community programs.

There are Jain temples in Nairobi and Mombasa. Jains are among the most successful and prosperous businessmen in Nairobi and other bigger towns.

== Jainism in South Africa ==
Jains emigrated to South Africa under British colonial rule in India and South Africa, and were successful in trade and business. Due to the high number of Jain tourists, in addition to the resident Jain community, many South African restaurants offer Jain food.

== See also ==
- List of Jain temples
- Jainism in Europe
- Jainism in Hong Kong
- Jainism in India
- Jainism in the United States
- Brampton Jain Temple
