= Jainism in Canada =

Canadian Jains
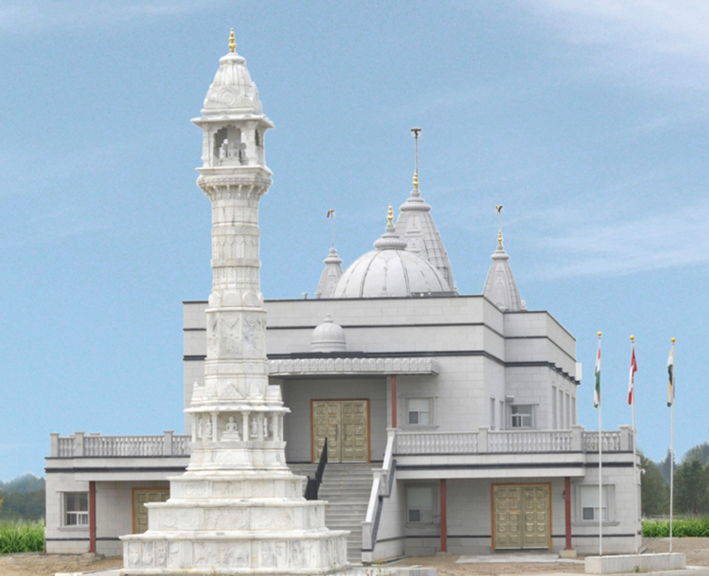
- Adinath Digambar Jain Temple in Brampton, Ontario

Total population
- 8,275

Languages
- Canadian English, Canadian French; Indian Languages

Religion
- Jainism

Jain Canadians number 8,275, composing 0.02% of Canada's population. Adherents of Jainism first settled in Canada in small numbers in the late 19th century. The number of Jains in Canada later increased, leading to the establishment of Jain temples in Canada. The type of Jainism in Canada later exhibited several differences from Jainism in India.

== History ==
The number of Jains in Canada greatly increased in the 1970s due to the liberalization of Canada's immigration laws. This has allowed for a community of Jain immigrants to become established in Canada, where they have formed a unique spiritual and cultural identity. Most Canadian Jains now live in Ontario, particularly Toronto.

== First temple ==
The first Jain society in the Toronto area was formed in 1974. At that time, there were approximately 150 Jain families in the region. A Jain religious centre was first officially established in Toronto in 1988 when the Jain society purchased a Church building and converted it into a temple. The temple served both the Śvetāmbara and Digambar communities, whose theology and religious practice differs in some aspects.

Jain Temple at Scarborough, Toronto is the largest Jain temple. There are almost 165 Jain Temples across Canada.

== Themes in Canadian Jainism ==
Canadian Jainism differs from Jainism in India in part due to the lack of Jain ascetics. In India, ascetics often provide more guidance on Jainism and correct way of practice.This difference has led to less opportunities for Canadian Jains to learn from the directly from ascetics. However, Jains in Canada try their best to learn through other sources and keep themselves knowledgeable. Canadian Jains respect all religions but maintain their principles and identity as Jains. Jains have supported and served together with many other communities especially Hindus in various community projects.

Many Canadian Jains actively promote vegetarianism, meditation, and interfaith dialogue.

== See also ==
- Brampton Jain Temple
- Jainism in the United States
- Jainism in Europe
- Jainism in Hong Kong
- Jainism in Singapore
