= Jainism in Goa =

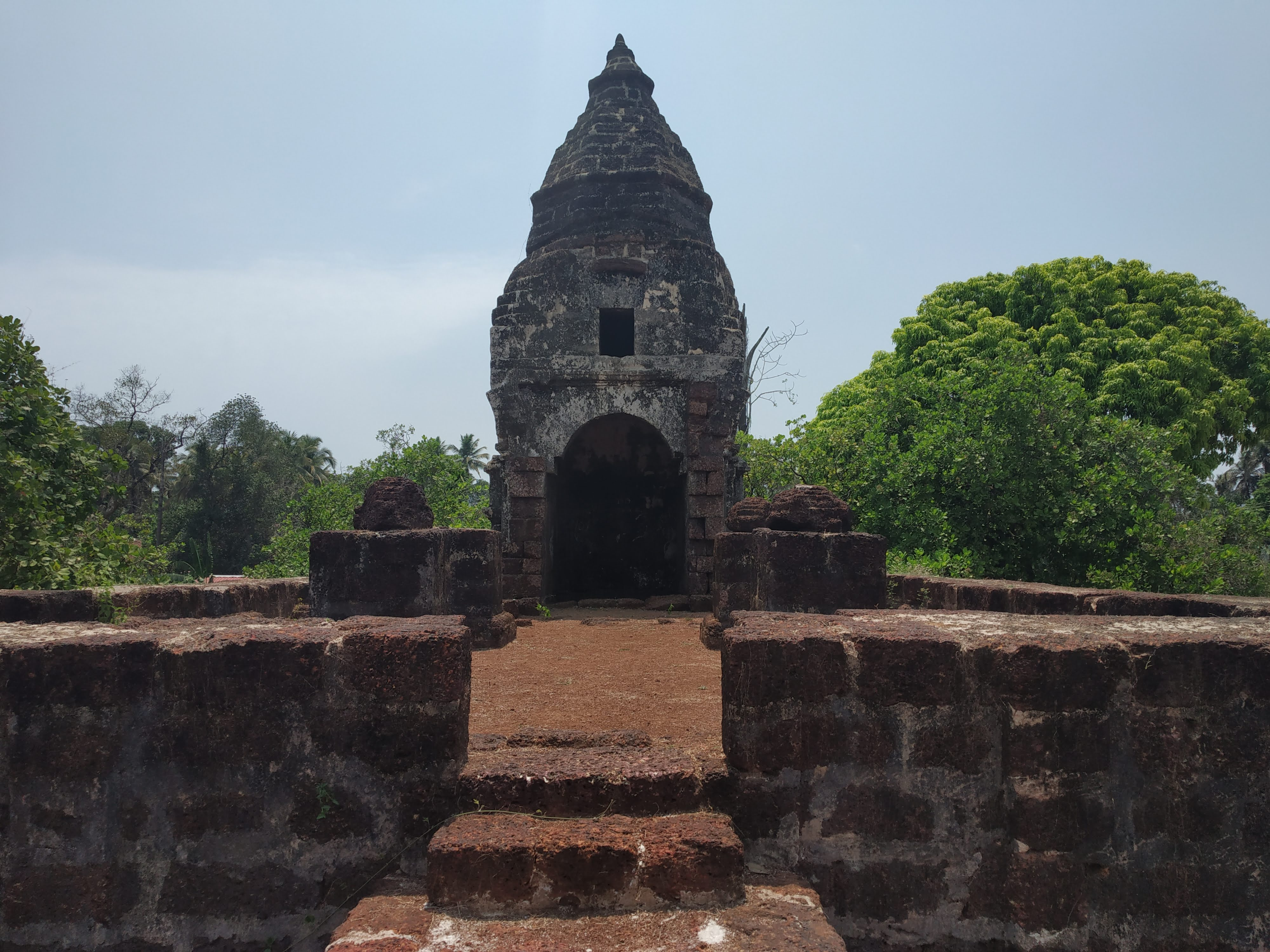
Cudnem Jain temple

Jainism flourished in Goa during the rule of Kadamba dynasty of Karnataka. Broken sculptures of the Jain Tirthankara Suparshvanatha, belonging to the period of the Goan Kadamba ruler Shivachitta Permadi Dev, were discovered in an old Jain temple in Jainkot, Naroa.

== Demographics ==
There were 864 Jains in Goa according to the 2001 census: 456 male and 408 female. The number increased to 1,109 in 2011 census.

== History ==
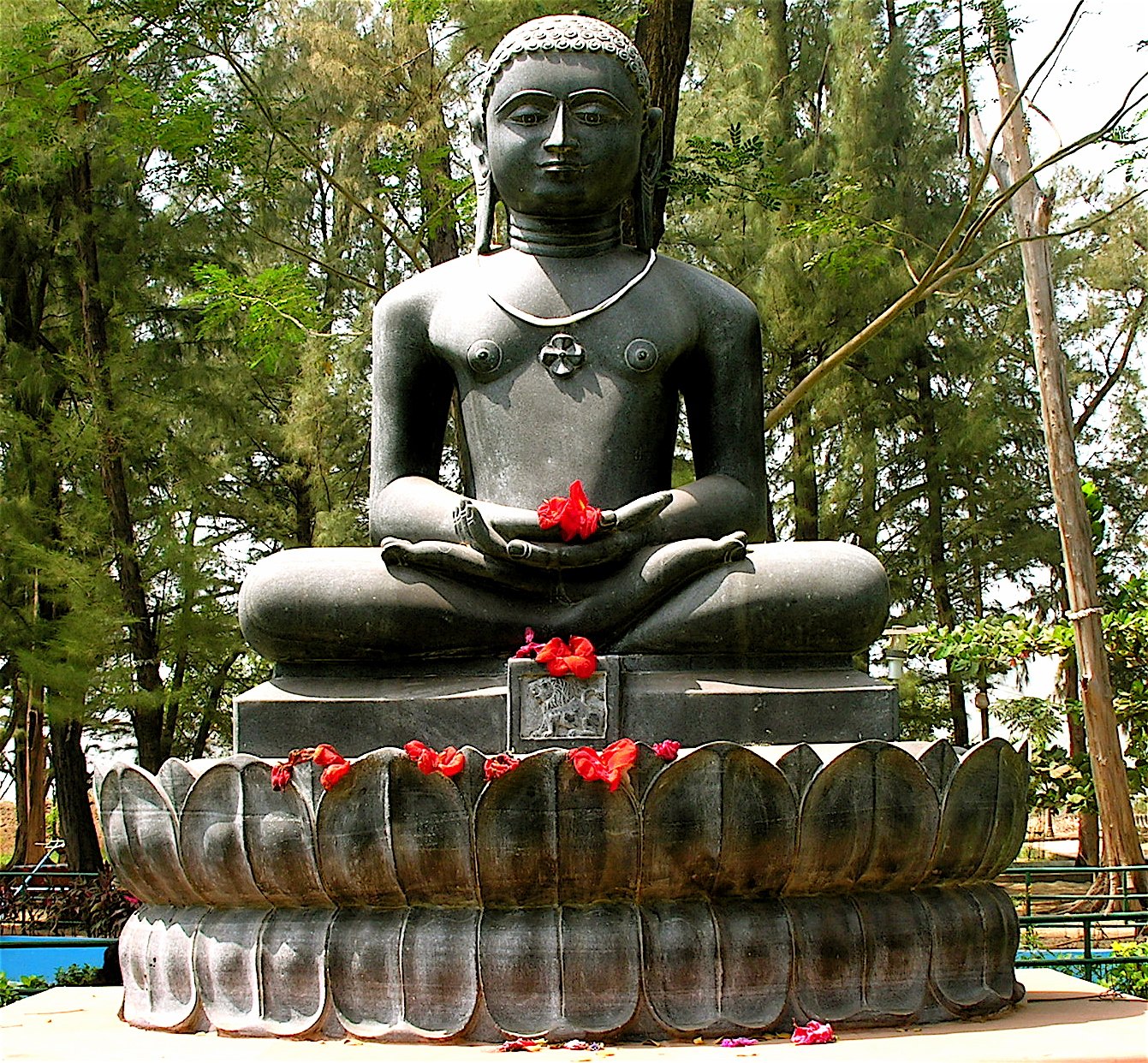
Statue of Mahavira inside Campi gardens, Panaji

Though present-day Goa has a minuscule population of Jains today (almost all immigrants from other states of India), it was once a hub for Jainism. The rich cultural heritage of this religion is slowly on its way to oblivion, since the government has failed to make any planned efforts to protect it after Liberation. Korgao, Cudnem, Bandivade, Chandor, Cothambi, and Naroa are places related to Jainism. All these villages are on river banks. Since ancient times, Goa has been one of the important centres of trade and commerce. During the Kadamba period, the rulers rarely opposed other religions and cults, and due to this, Jainism flourished.

Chandrakant Bhoje Patil from Ponda says, “Once Goa had Jain settlements. The sculptures, temples, inscriptions found in various parts tell us how Jainism flourished here. Most of the vestiges of the Jain heritage are lying neglected now. We have submitted a memorandum recently (as noted in year 2014) to chief minister Manohar Parrikar to take steps for the protection and conservation of these assets of our history.”

The ancient Jain temple of Cudnem village dedicated to Rishabhanatha was constructed by Gurjara community in tenth century. It went to ruins in fifteenth century. Broken idols of Tirthankara were discovered during an excavation in 1986 by the directorate of archaeology and archives.

Gurjaras also constructed the Jain temple at Narve, Bicholim in 1150 AD. The sculpture of Parshvanatha, the 23rd Tirthankara was discovered in Hindolewada, Narve.

Another ancient Jain temple of twenty-second Tirthankara Neminatha in Bandora, Goa built by King Sripala. The Kannada inscription discovered in Bandivade of Ponda mentions that king Sripala established this village and built the Jain temple of Neminath which is presently in ruins.

The idols of Tirthankara were also found in Chandreshwar temple in Kothambi village, situated on the right bank of the River Mandovi.Kothambi, here the sculptures of Kuber, Yakshi and the broken idol of Tirthankar were lying neglected. The idols of Yakshi and Kuber have been housed at the Goa state museum but the idol of Tirthankar is still (as noted on 2014) left unattended to fight the sunlight and rains.

The first Jain sculpture (belonging to the early southern Shilahara Dynasty) in Salcete, Chandor was discovered by Father Henry Heras during one of his expeditions.
