= Jainism in Hong Kong =

Hong Kong Jains
- The Jain symbol that was agreed upon by all Jain sects in 1974

Total population
- 500

Languages
- English, Cantonese; Indian languages

Religion
- Jainism

There are about 500 Jains in Hong Kong, who immigrated to Hong Kong later than most other Indian groups. They originate mostly from the Indian states of Rajasthan, Gujarat and other states. Some Jains belong to Hong Kong originally by mixed ancestry and have Asian features. A small group of people who belonged to Hong Kong by ancestry converted to Jainism under the influence of other Jains. Their community grew rapidly during the 1980s. The Jains are most prominent in the diamond trading business. In 1996, members of the community founded a Jain temple, Shree Hong Kong Jain Sangh, in Tsim Sha Tsui.

When the community was small, the Jains did not build separate religious institutions but allied themselves with the Hindus and participated in building ecumenical Hindu temples, with space set aside for their own images within them.

== See also ==
- Jainism in Canada
- Jainism in Europe
- Jainism in Singapore
- Jainism in the United States
