= Jainism in Europe =

The Jain symbol that was agreed upon by all Jain sects in 1974.

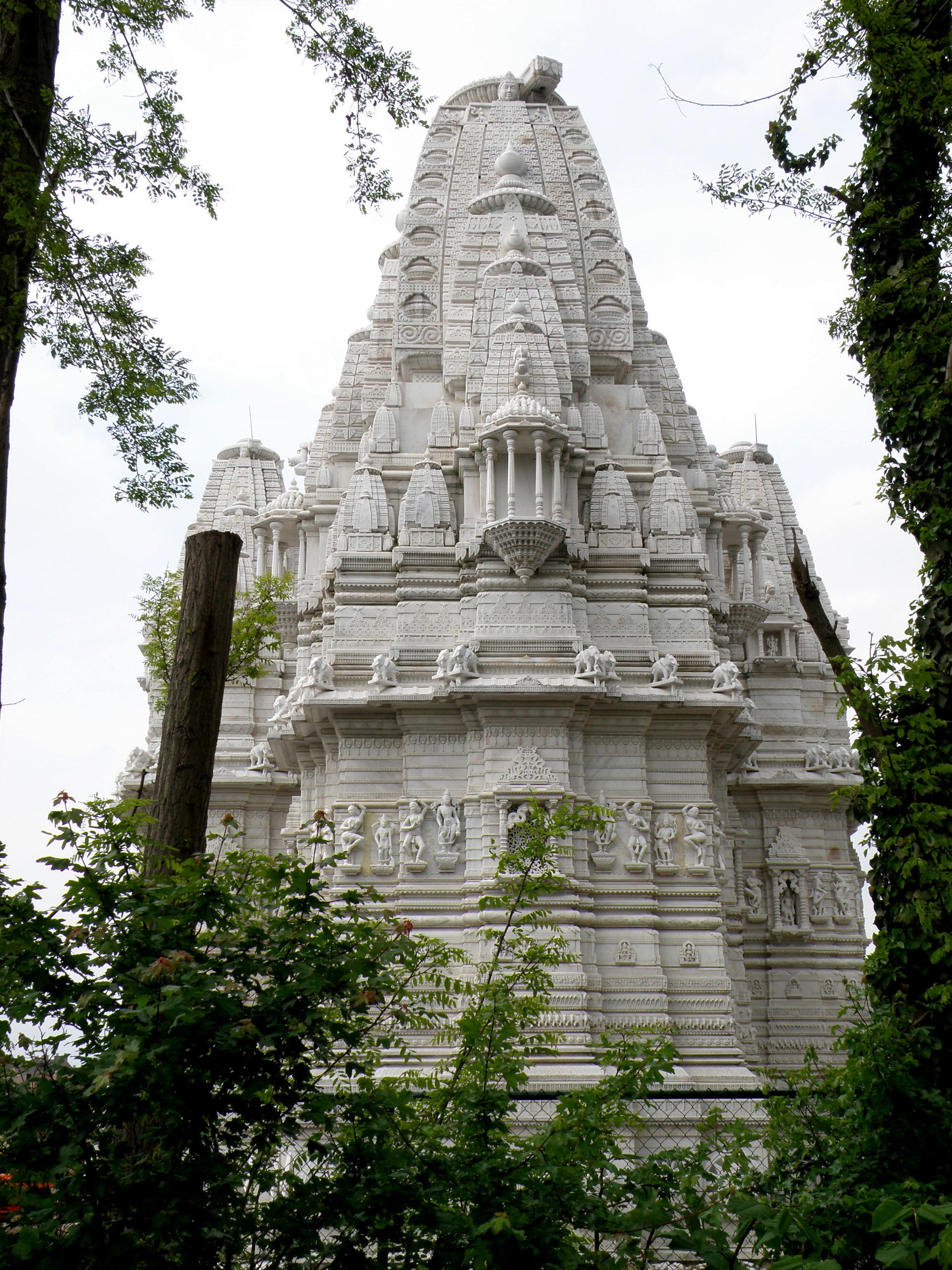
Jain temple in Antwerp, Belgium

The introduction of Jainism to the West is credited to a German scholar, Hermann Jacobi, who translated some Jain literature and published it in the series 'Sacred Books of East' in 1884. In Europe, the largest Jain communities are in Belgium and the UK.

Jains living outside India belong to various traditions: Digambara, Śvetāmbara, Terapanthi, Sthanakvasi, Shrimad Rajchandra are all represented. In many cases, they gather and worship together in spite of sectarian differences.

== Jainism in Ireland ==
The Jain community in Ireland is involved across different occupations. The Jains in Ireland are estimated to be around 1000 people. The majority live in and around Dublin but a few families are spread across other parts of Ireland, including Northern Ireland. Jains in Ireland are a well settled and respected community. Jain Samaj Ireland includes members of all different panths within Jainism.

Jain Samaj Ireland aspires to build a Jain Temple in Ireland and is actively seeking support and guidance from various other Samaj in India and across the world.

== Jainism in Germany ==
There are no Jain temples in Germany. However, there are a few people living in Germany who practice Jainism. Additionally, the Museum of Asian Art in Berlin houses an intricately carved wooden 'Jain house temple'. To support and practice Jainism, there are a few organizations or associations.

== Jainism in Belgium ==
The Jain community in Europe, especially in Belgium, is mostly involved in the diamond business. A small group of Jains also settled in Belgium in the 1970s, having left Africa as political refugees.

The Gujarati Jains in Belgium are estimated to be around 1500 people. The majority live in Antwerp, working in the wholesale diamond business. Belgian Indian Gujarati Jains control two-thirds of the rough diamonds trade and supplied India with roughly 36% of their rough diamonds. A major temple, with a cultural centre, has been built in Antwerp (Wilrijk), the diamond capital. Their spiritual leader is a full-fledged member of the Belgian Council of Religious Leaders, which he joined on 17 December 2009.

== Jainism in Poland ==
The Jain community in Poland is involved across different occupations and Jains in Poland to estimate below 200 people, where majority of people are scattered around Warsaw, Krakow and few other cities. As on March 25, 2023 establishment of the statute of Shri 1008 Mahavir Swami (Digambar) was successfully completed by Jain Community of Poland in “Hindu Bhavan Temple” / "Świątynia Hindu Bhavan" in Warsaw, Poland and marked as second temple in Europe after Antwerp, Belgium where devotees can offer their prayers daily. Jain Samaj Poland includes members of all different paths with Jainism.

== Jainism in the United Kingdom ==
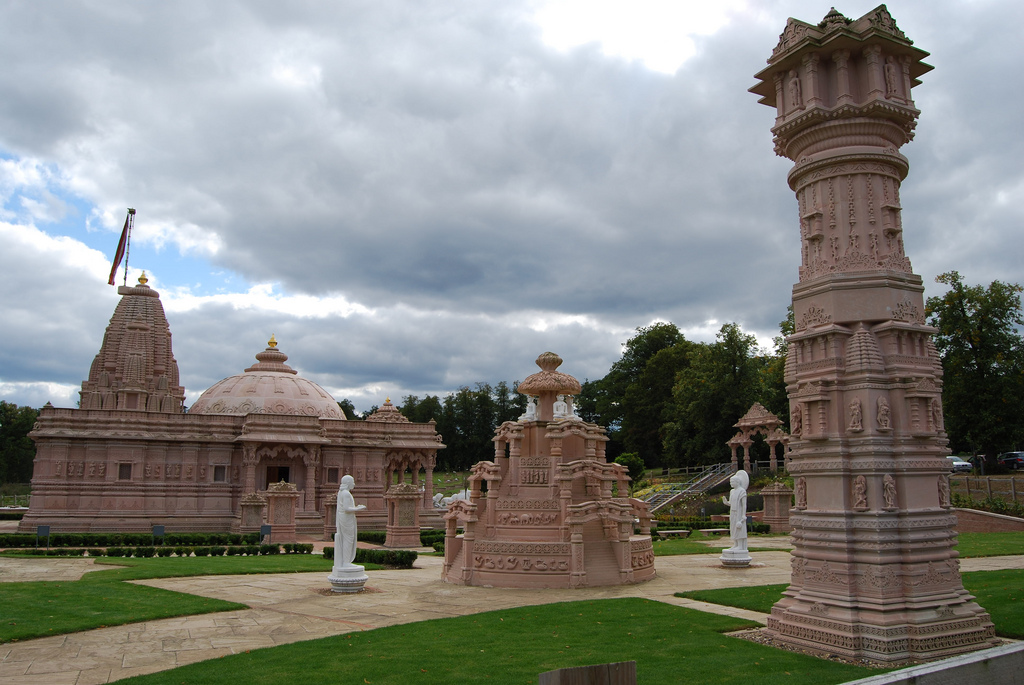
Jain Temple, Potters Bar, Hertfordshire

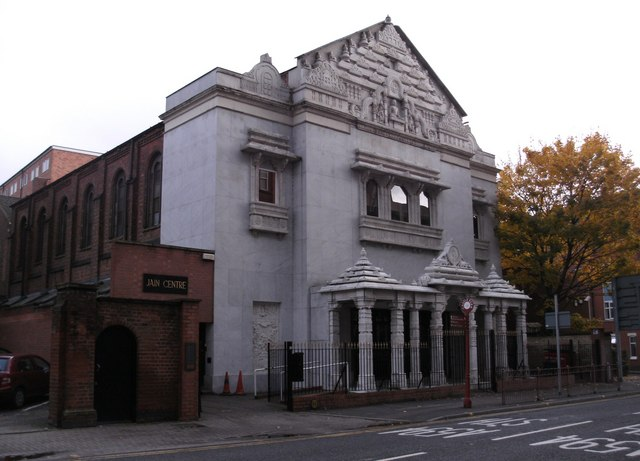
The Jain centre on Oxford Street

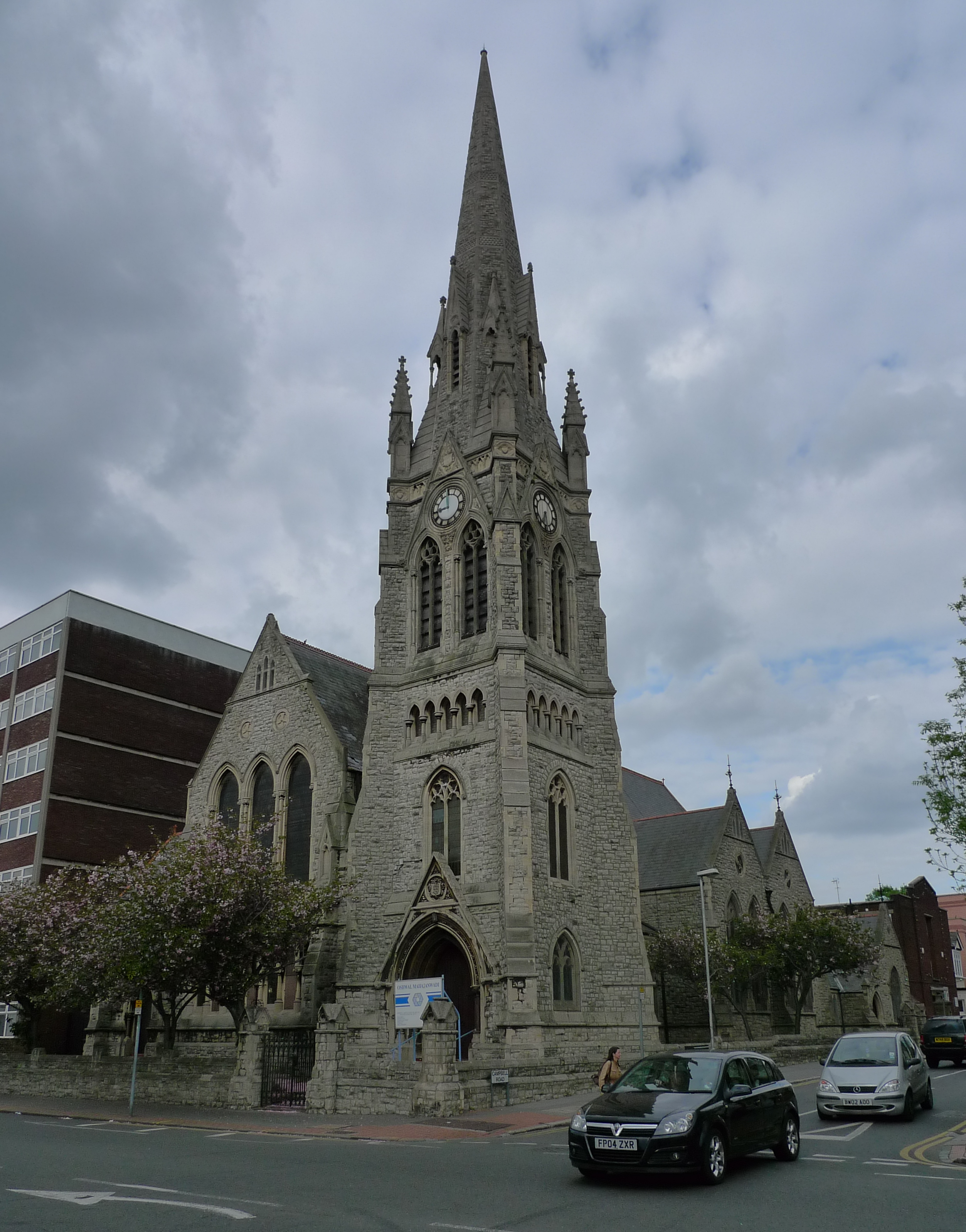
Oshwal Mahajanwadi, Croydon

As of 2016, there are around 35,000 Jains in the United Kingdom.

One of the first Jain settlers, Champat Rai Jain, was in England during 1892–1897 to study law. He established the Rishabh Jain Lending Library in 1930. Later, he translated several Jain texts into English.

Leicester houses one of the world's few Jain temples outside of India. There is an Institute of Jainology at Greenford, London.

The last decade has seen the growth of the Jain community in Greater London. Currently the Jain Network have a derasar in Colindale and The Mahavir Foundation has a temple at Kenton Road, Kenton. It has consecrated images of Shri Mahavir Swami, Shri Parshvanath, Aadinathji, Shri Simandhar Swami and Shri Munisuvrata Swami. It also has Shri Gautam Swami and Padmavati Mata. There is a separate shrine of Manibhadra Vir, Ghantakarna Mahavir and Nakoda Bhairavji.

Shrimad Rajchandra Mission Dharampur also have UK centres in Leicester, London and Manchester.

== Timeline ==
- 1847: Vegetarian Society established in UK.
- 1873: Hermann Jacobi encounters Jain texts in London. He later visited India to further study and translate some of them.
- 1891-1901: M.K. Gandhi in London corresponds with Shrimad Rajchandra regarding questions raised by missionaries.
- 1893 : Virchand Gandhi captivates western world with his participation in First ever World religion Parliament at Chicago. And thereafter had huge fan followings from US and Europe.
- 1892: Champat Rai Jain (C.R. Jain) in England during 1892–1897, to study law. He established a Jain library. Later he translated several Jain texts into English.
- 1906-1910: Jugmandar Lal Jaini (J.L. Jaini) at Oxford as a law student.
- 1909: J. L. Jaini created the Jain Literature Society in London together with F. W. Thomas and H. Warren.
- Hemchandra's "Yogaśāstra" was first translated into Japanese in the 1920s!
- 1930: the Rishabh Jain Lending Library was established by Champat Rai Jain.
- Tattvartha Sutra and the Dashavaikalika Sutra were translated in the 1940s.
- 1949: The World Jaina Mission, founded in London, by M. McKay, W. H. Talbot, F. Mansell, and Mrs. K. P. Jain.
- Forty Japanese students were sponsored by the Government of India in the early 1950s to live and study in India – some of them studied Navinaya in Varanasi and Gujarat, which led to new interest in the study of Jainism in Japan; one of the accomplishments was the first Japanese book by Minakata Kumagusu to simplify and translate the concepts of Jainism into Japanese for use by the common people in Japan.
- 1971: Idi Amin expelled Indians from Uganda. Jains from Eastern Africa started migrating to UK.
- 1973: Jain Samaj Leicester was formed.
- 1979: An old church building in Oxford Street, in heart of Leicester was bought and named the Jain Centre.
- 1980: The Jain Samaj was expanded as a European body.
- 1980: First Digamber Temple outside India established in Kenya.
- In the early 1980s, the Jain Society of Toronto was founded and the first Jain Center was established in that city
- 1982: Jain Samaj opened an office in London, The All India (Overseas) Jinalaya Samiti, was created to complete the temple according to the plans drawn by the architects from Leicester, Bombay and Ahmedabad.
- 1983: On 10 November, Shilanyas ceremony the laying of the foundation stones for the first fully consecrated Jain Temple in the western world, was performed.
- 1984 : On 14 December, the Anjanshalaka ceremony was carried at Pali (Rajasthan) for the images of Shree Shantinath, Shree Mahavirswami and Shree Parswanath.
- 1985 : On 25 August, the above images were placed in the Jain Centre, Leicester.
- 1988 : On 8 July, images were entered in Garbagriha (permanent place of adobe) and the Pratistha Mahatosova was celebrated for 16 days starting from 8 July 1988 to 23 July 1988.
- 1992 The Jain Cultural Centre of Antwerp VZW was formed with 12 committee members and 52 founder members. And land for Jain temple and meditation centre (upashray) was purchased.
- 1997 Mahavir Foundation was registered as a Charity Organisation.
- 2001 Construction of Antwerp Jain temple and meditation hall began.
- 2007 Antwerp Jain idols Anjanshalaka took place on 31 January in India and was performed by 'Jain Saints Acharyashri Subodhsagarji, Acharyashri Manohar KiritiSagarsuriji, Acharyashri Udaykirtisagarsuriji ' and also Shri Narendra Hiralal.
- 2008 On 25 August the idols were brought to Antwerp soil by air, followed by a huge procession.
- 2010 On 27 August in Antwerp the idols pratistha was performed

== Photo gallery ==
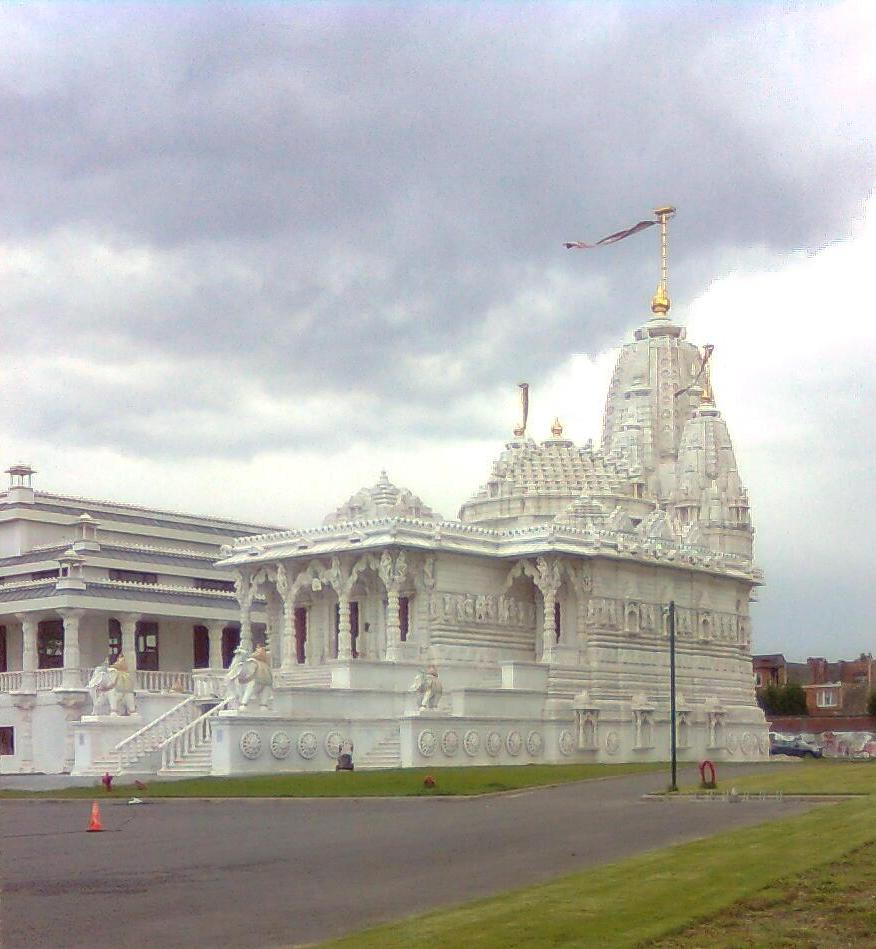
Jain temple in Laarstraat, Antwerp

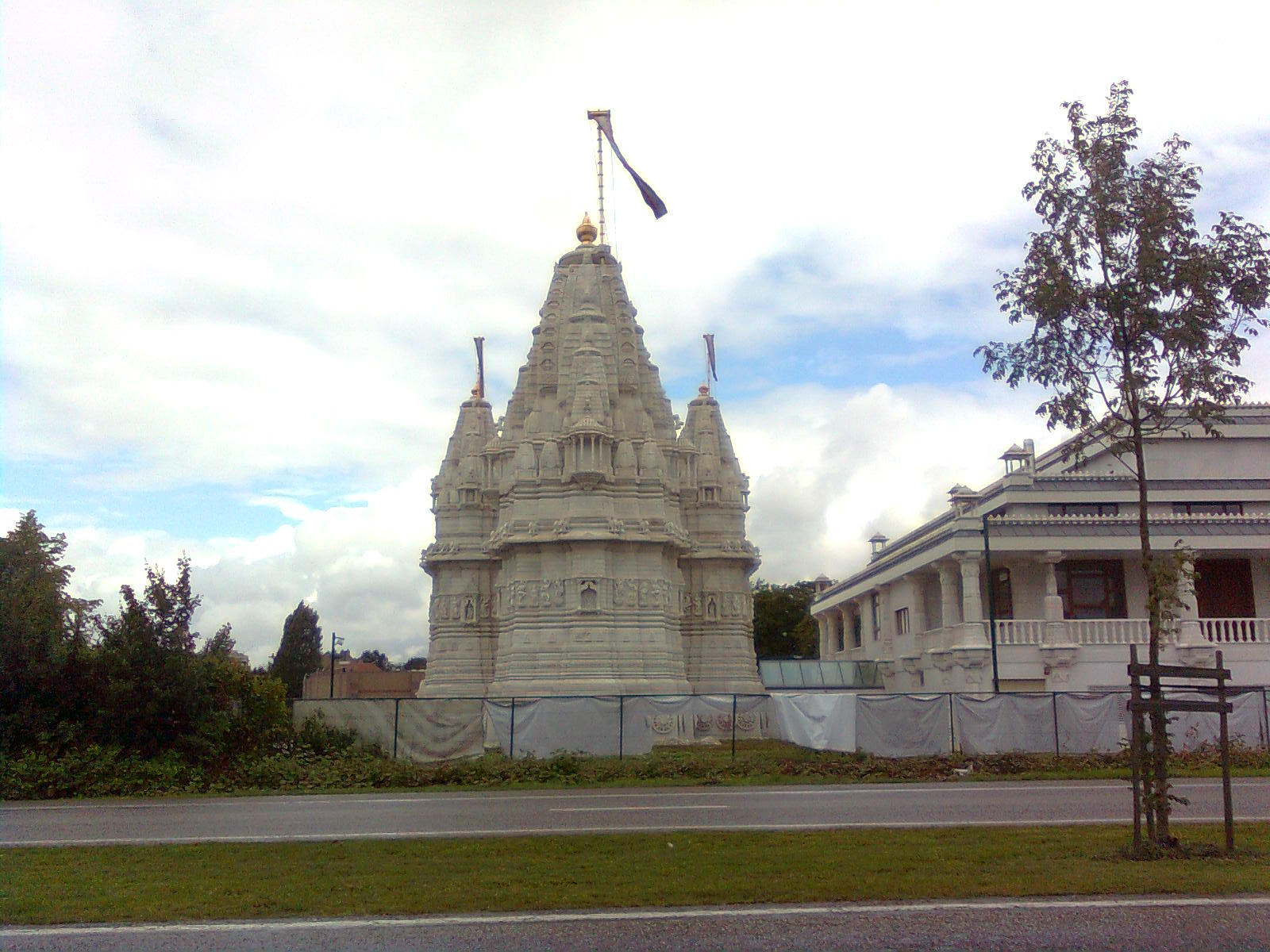
Jain temple in Laarstraat, Antwerp

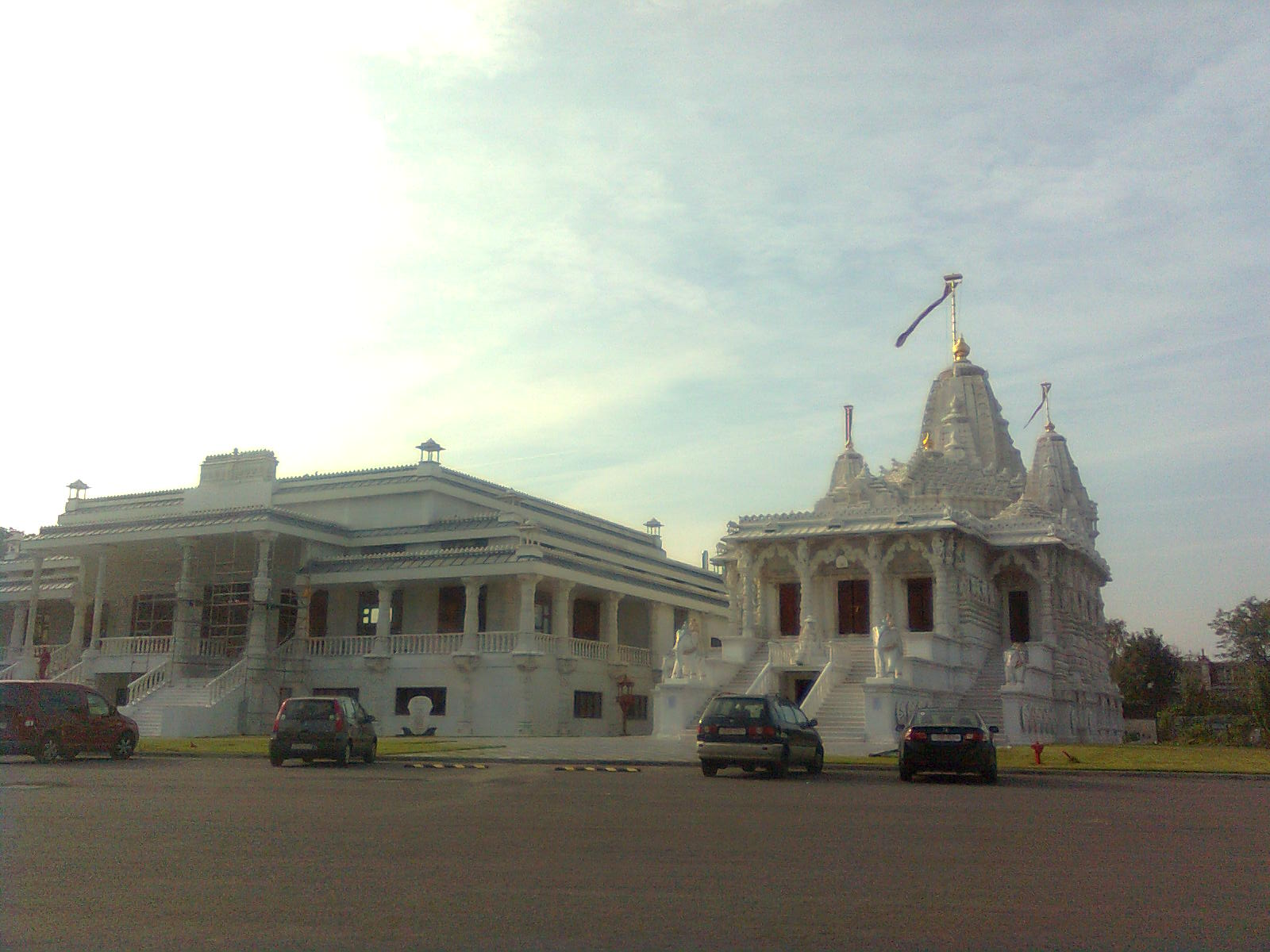
Jain temple in Laarstraat, Antwerp

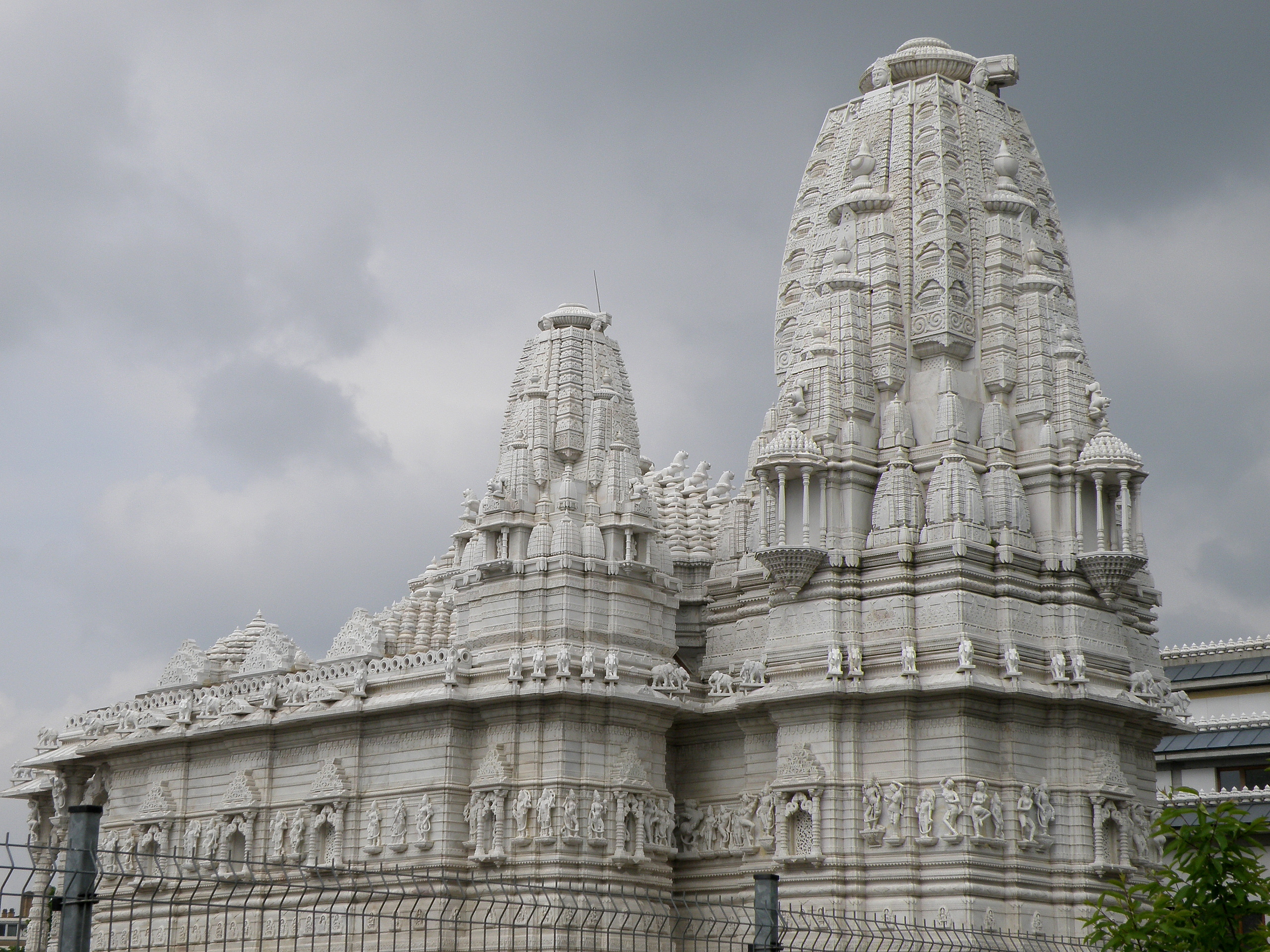
Jain temple in Laarstraat, Antwerp

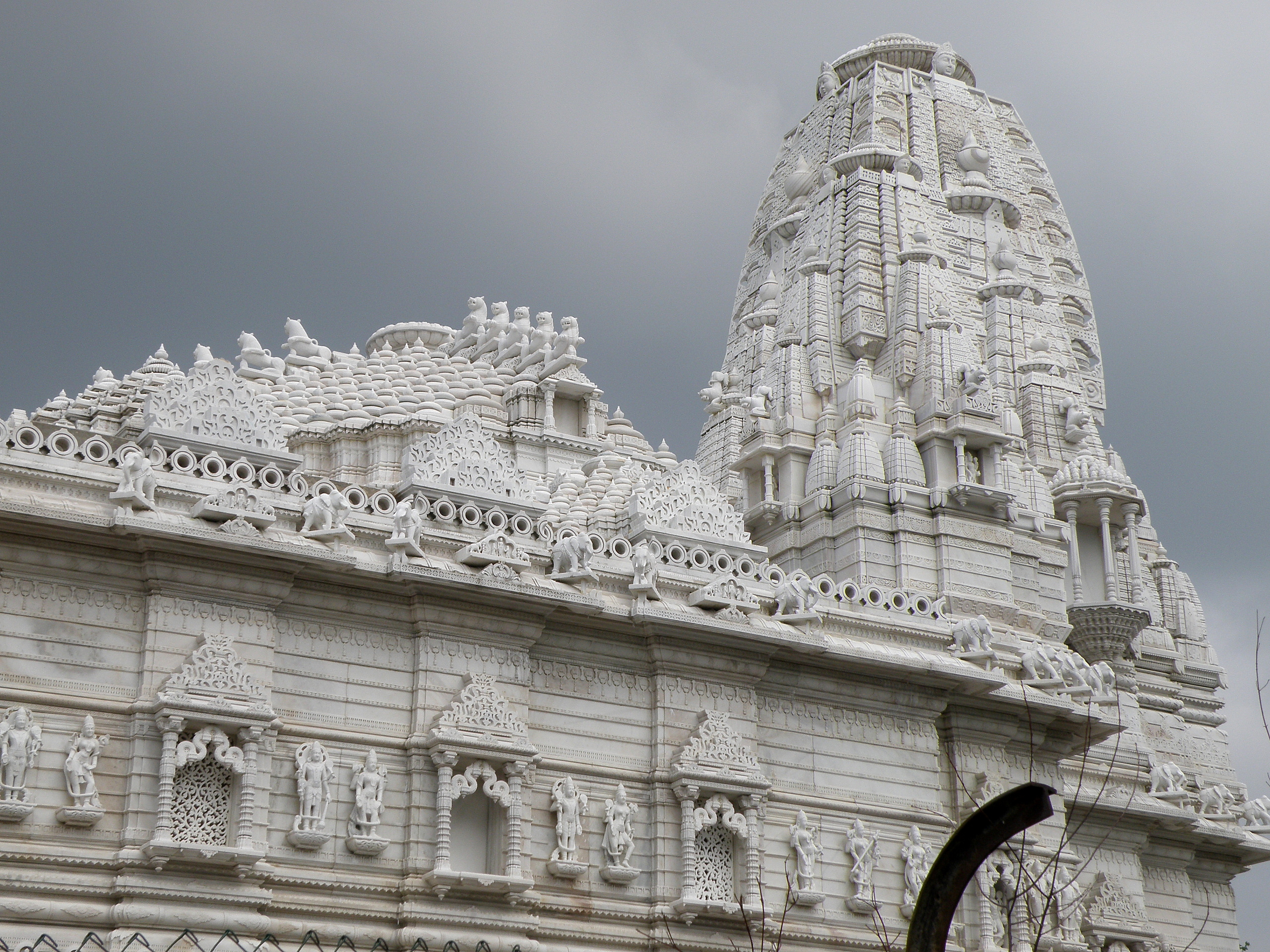
Jain temple in Laarstraat, Antwerp

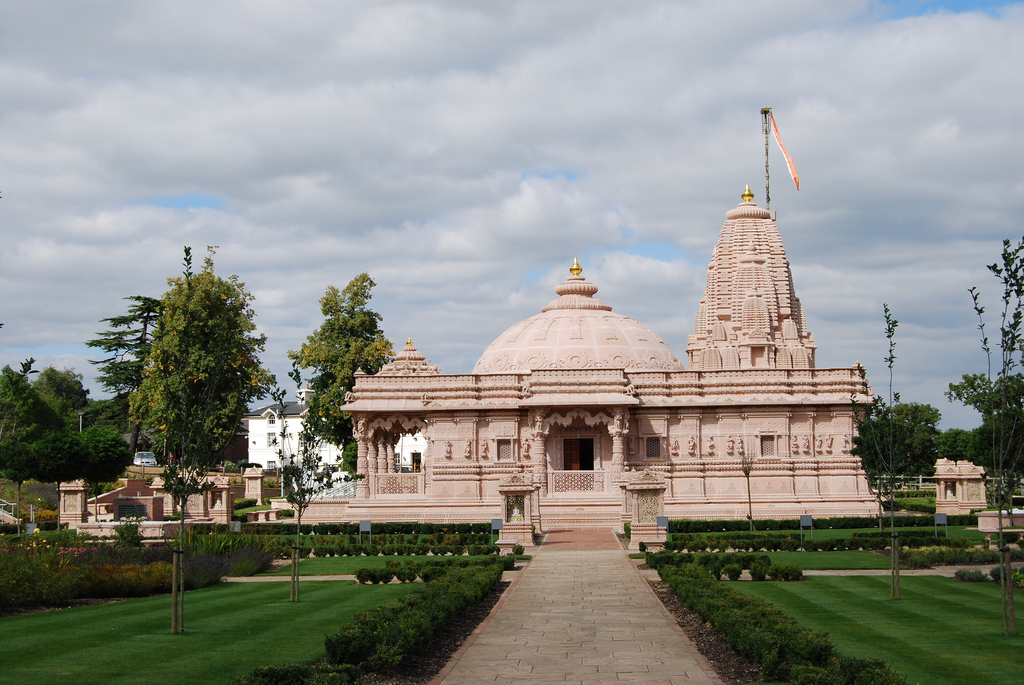
Jain Temple, Pottersbar, Hertfordshire

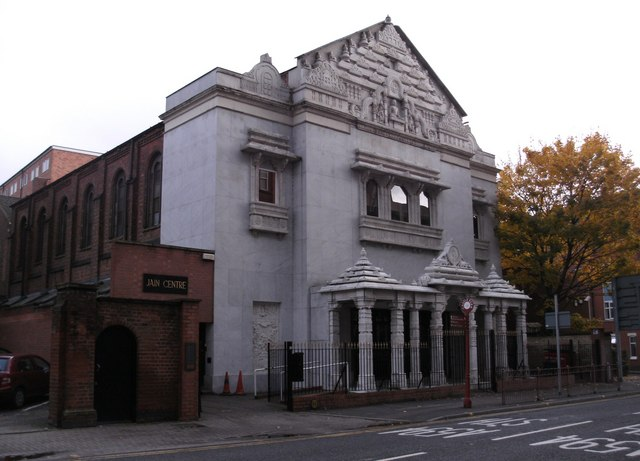
Jain Centre in Oxford Street, Leicester

== See also ==
- Jainism in Canada
- Jainism in Hong Kong
- Jainism in Singapore
- Jainism in the United States
