= Jainism in Singapore =

Singaporean Jains
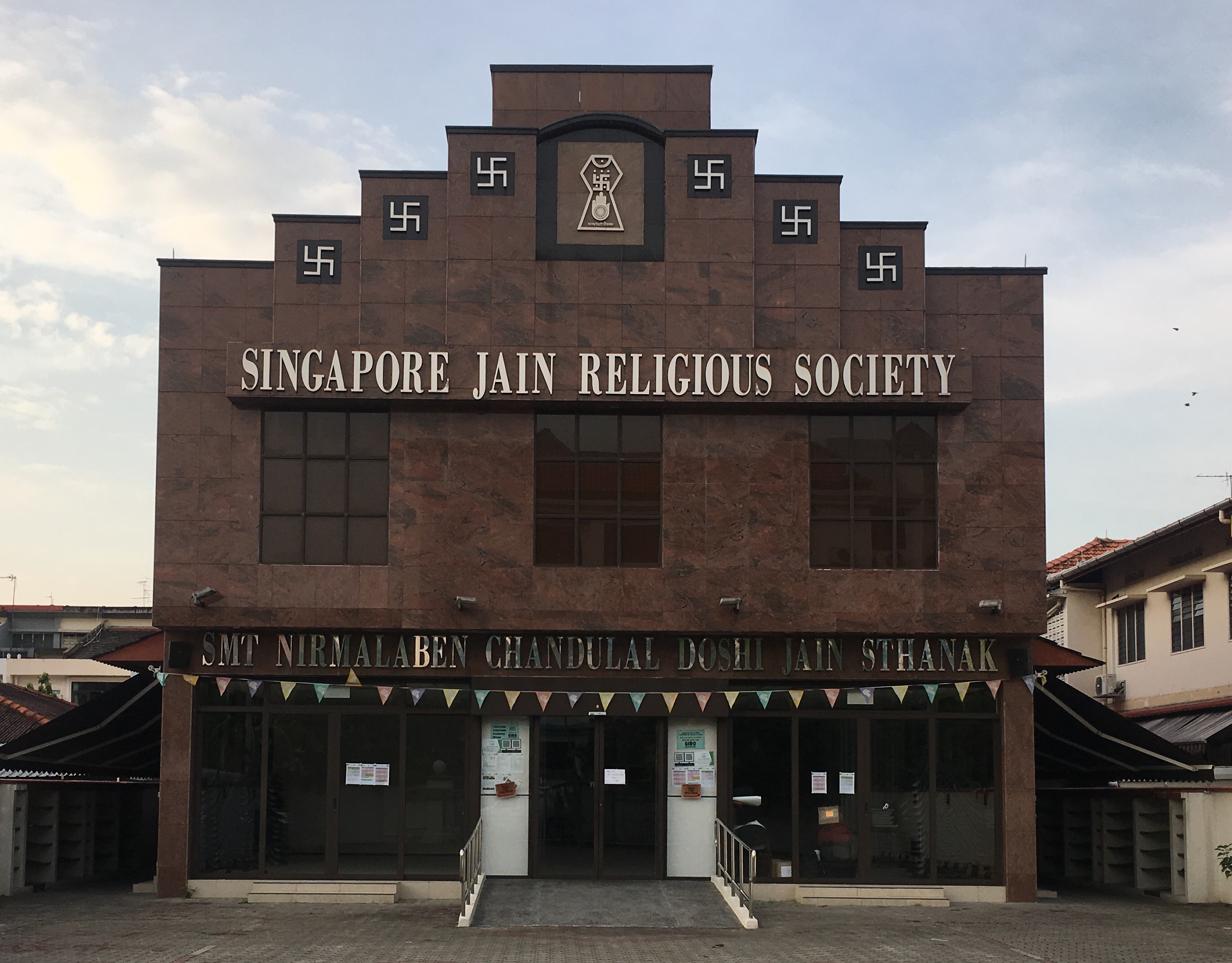
- The Singapore Jain Religious Society on Jalan Yasin in Singapore.

Total population
- 1,500 (resident (Note: In Singapore, the term "resident" refers to both citizens and permanent residents (PRs).) population)

Languages
- Languages of Singapore; Indian Languages

Religion
- Jainism

The Jain community celebrated a presence of 100 years in Singapore marking the occasion by rededicating the "Stanak" and consecrating the idol of Mahavira. This brings together the two main sects of Jains - Śvetāmbara and Digambara. The Singapore Jain Religious Society engages in keeping traditions and practices alive by transmitting Jain principles to the next generation. It also has a strong history of community involvement. The community has no temple, but the Singapore Jain Religious Society has a building at 18 Jalan Yasin.

As of 2010, there are 1,500 Jain residents in Singapore.

== History ==
Jains have settled in Singapore since the beginning of this century just before or after the first world war (1910 – 1914).

== Jain unity ==
According to the Singapore Jain Religious Society's constitution, any Jain whether Śvetāmbara or Digambar, speaking any language could become a member and carry out Jain religious activities, keeping to fundamental principles of Jainism.

== Singapore Tamil Jains Forum ==
Singapore has a huge population of Tamils and thus also has a small community of Tamil Jains. The Tamil Jains in Singapore congregate under the banner of Singapore Tamil Jains Forum. The forum is headed by Dharmanathan Varthamanan.
