= Timeline of Jainism =

Jainism is an ancient Indian religion belonging to the śramaṇa tradition. It prescribes ahimsa (non-violence) towards all living beings to the greatest possible extent. The three main teachings of Jainism are ahimsa, anekantavada (non-absolutism), and aparigraha (non-possessiveness). Followers of Jainism take five main vows: ahimsa, satya (not lying), asteya (non stealing), brahmacharya (chastity), and aparigraha. Monks follow them completely whereas śrāvakas (householders) observe them partially. Self-discipline and asceticism are thus major focuses of Jainism.

== Before Common Era (BCE) ==
- 584,979–574,979 BCE: Naminatha, 21st Tirthankara
- Neminatha, 22nd Tirthankara: According to Jain beliefs, he lived 84,650 years before the 23rd Tirthankara, Parshvanatha. He existed in the Mahabharata era and was the cousin brother of Krishna.
- 877–777 BCE: Parshvanatha, 23rd Tirthankar of Jainism. He is the earliest Jain tirthankara who can be reliably dated.
- 9th-8th century BCE Avakinnayo Karakandu or 'Karakanda' was a powerful Jain monarch of Kalinga.
- 847 BCE: Tirthankar Parswanath attained enlightenment at Ahichchhatra at the age of 30.

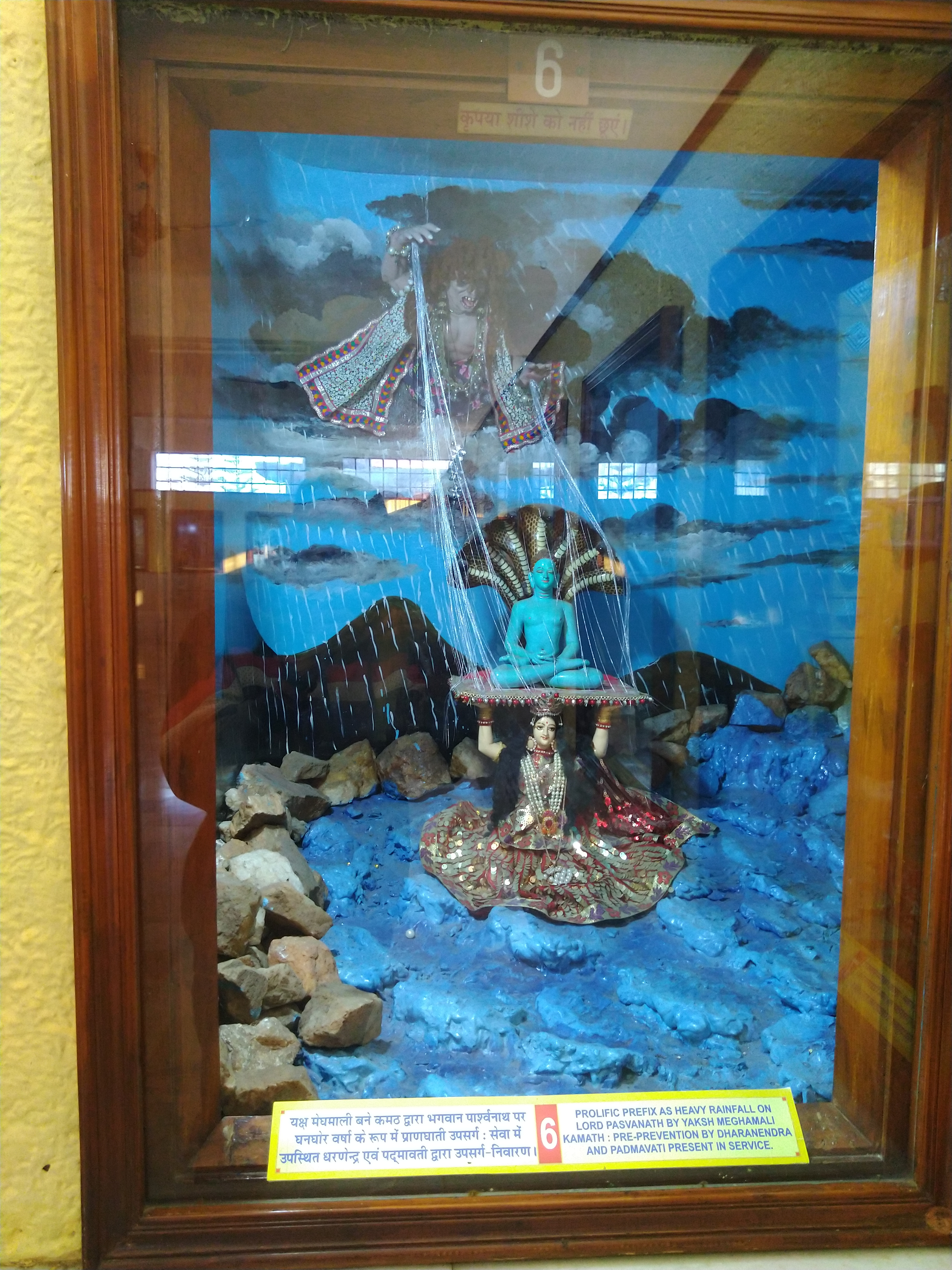
A diorama in Jain Museum of Madhuban, Giridih depicting the event at Ahichchhatra

- 599–527 BCE: Mahavira, 24th and last Tirthankar of this era.
- 607-507 BCE: Ganadhar Sudharma Swami
- d. 470 BCE:establishment of the Śrīmali and Porvāl clans by Swayambrabhasuri of Upkesa Gaccha's.
- 5th century BCE: Establishment of the Oswāl clan by Ratnabrabhasuri of Upkesa Gaccha of Śvetāmbara Jains.
- d. 443 BCE: Barli Jain inscriptions.
- d. 357 BCE: Acharya Bhadrabahu
- d. 270 BCE: The tamil brahmi inscriptions mentions that workers of Neṭuñceḻiyaṉ I, a Pandyan king of Sangam period, (c. 270 BCE) made stone beds for Jain monks. inscription shows that Kaṭalaṉ Vaḻuti, a worker of Neṭuñceḻiyaṉ, made a stone bed for the Jain monk Nanta-siri Kuvaṉ.
- 3rd century BCE: Lohanipur torso a damaged statue of Jaina Tirthankara Rishabhdev.
- 3rd century BCE: The inscriptions at Vaddamanu indicates Vaddamanu as a Jain center during the 3rd century BCE.
- 2nd century BCE:Sithanavassal a 2nd-century BCE Tamil Jain cave complex.
- d. 162 BCE: Hathigumpha inscription mentions the Namokar Mantra and Jain monarch Kharvela.
- 2nd century BCE: Namokar Mantra epigraphically attested in Maharashtra. Pale cave is one of the oldest Jain cave in Maharashtra, which is believed to be from 200 BCE. Here the Namokar Mantra is written in Brahmi script.
- 2nd century BCE: Thiruparankundram hill in Tamil Nadu is home to ancient Jain beds with Tamil Brahmi Jain inscriptions dated to 2nd century BCE.
- 2nd-1st Century BCE:Samanar Malai has several very old Tamil-Brahmi Jain cave inscriptions, likely the early centuries of the common era.
- 2nd Century BCE - 1st Century CE: Bronze Images of Pārśvanātha now stored at Chhatrapati Shivaji Maharaj Vastu Sangrahalaya
- 150 BCE to 1023 CE: Inscriptions of Kankali Tila dated to 150BCE

== Common Era (CE) ==
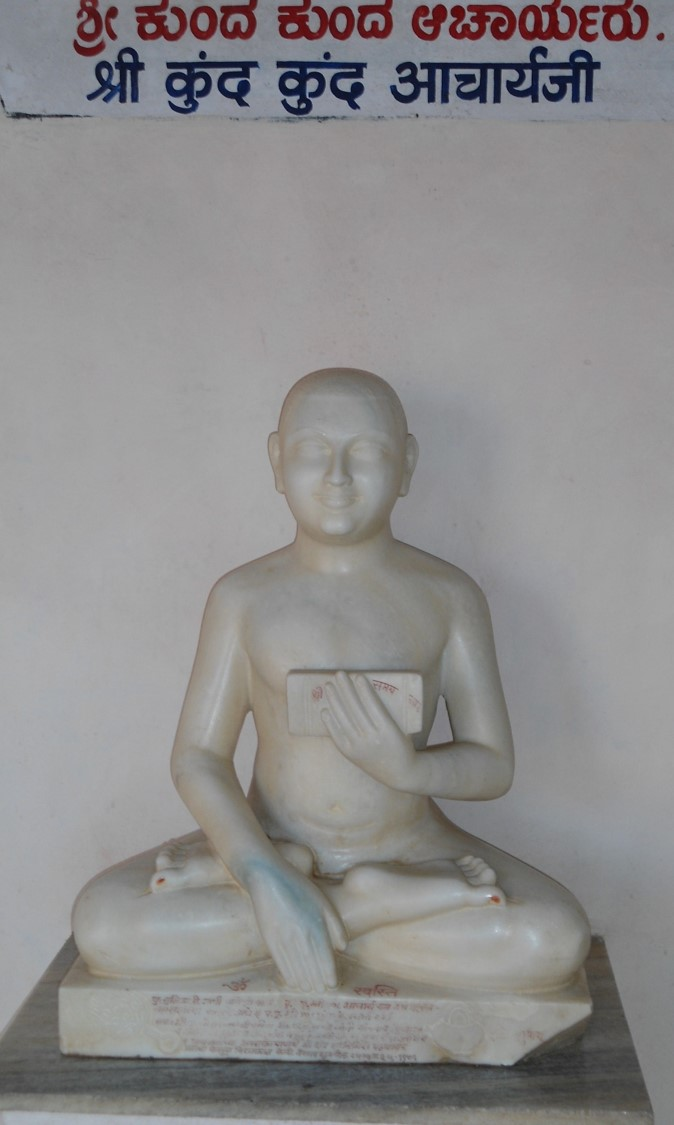
Sculpture depicting Acharya Kundkund

- 1st century CE: Acharya Kundkund
- 87 CE: Pushpadanta starts to write Shatkhandagam.
- 156 CE: Acharya Bhutabali completes writing of Shatkhandagam.
- 454 CE: Devardhigani compiles Jain Agamas.
- 5th century CE: first mention of the Mula Sangh order
- 5th century CE: Pataini temple, Kahaum pillar and Kanakagiri Jain tirth were constructed.

== Middle Ages ==
- 9th century
  - The Tirumalai complex in Tamil Nadu is established.
- 10th century
  - Life of Nemichandra, a famous Jain author.
  - Jain temple of Gurjiwada, Cudnem, Bicholim, Goa was constructed.
  - 982: Monolithic statue of Bahubali erected at Shravana belagola
- 12th century
  - Kashtha Sangh
  - 1172: Acharya Hemachandra
  - 1194: Tristutik
- 13th century
  - 1229: Tapa Gachchha
- 15th century
  - Ancient Jain temple of Gurjiwada, Cudnem, Bicholim, Goa was in ruins.
- 17th century
  - 1664: Digambar Terapanth
  - 1658: Digambara Jain Lal Mandir temple in Delhi built.
- 18th century
  - 1760: Swetembar Terapanth
  - 1780: Sthanakvasi and Terapanthi orders

== British India ==
- 1868: Jain temple in Mumbai
- 1880s: Reform movement of Acharya Rajendrasuri
- 1888–1896: Mathura Kankali Tila excavation led by Dr. A.A. Führer, documented by Vincent A. Smith establishing Mathura as major ancient center of Jainism.
- 1893: Virachand Gandhi participates in Chicago's World Parliament of Religions& Won Silver Medal.
- 1904: Jain temple at the Louisiana Purchase Exposition
- 1927: Madras High Court in Gateppa v. Eramma and others recognizes "Jainism as a distinct religion"

== Post-Partition ==
- 1970s: Significant presence of Jainism in the United States.
- 1972: Aacharya Shri Vidyasagar Maharaj elevated to the Acharya status.
- 1975: Acharya Sushil Kumar (Jain monk) ji travels to USA. The first Jain muni to travel by air out of the Indian subcontinent.
- 1975: Monolithic statue of Bahubali is installed at Dharmasthala, Karnataka, India under the auspices of D. Rathnavarma Heggade and Mathrushree D. Rathnamma Heggade, members of Dharmasthala's Jaina lineage who also manage the local Shivaite temple. Carving work began in 1966 under the sculptor Rejala Gopalkrishna Shenoy of Karkala.
- 1976: In Arya Samaj Education Trust, Delhi & Others v. The Director of Education, Delhi Administration, Delhi & Others (AIR 1976 Delhi 207), the Court referred to Heinrich Zimmer's Philosophies of India describing Jainism as "a heterodox Indian religion" and J. N. Farquhar's Modern Religious Movements in India describing Jainism as "a rival of Hinduism."
- 1981: First Jain convention in Los Angeles
- 1983: Formal organization of JAINA (Jain Associations in North America)
- 1990: Temple Pratishtha, The Jain Sangh Cherry Hill, New Jersey
- 1990: Temple Pratishtha, Jain Society of Metropolitan Washington
- 1991: Founding of Siddhachalam, the Jain tirtha
- 1991: Death of Jain Acharya Shri Ramchandra Surishwarji
- 1993: Temple Pratishtha, Jain Society of Metropolitan Chicago
- 1995: Temple Pratishtha, Jain Center of Cincinnati and Dayton
- 1998: Temple Pratishtha, Jain Society of Greater Detroit
- 2000: Temple Pratishtha, Jain Center of Northern California (JCNC)
- 2000: Jain Vishwa Bharati Orlando
- 2005: the Supreme Court of India declined to grant Jains the status of a religious minority throughout India, leaving it to the respective states to decide on the minority status of Jainis.
- 2006: the Supreme Court opined that "Jain Religion is indisputably not a part of the Hindu religion" (Para 25, Committee of Management Kanya Junior High School Bal Vidya Mandir, Etah, U.P. v. Sachiv, U.P. Basic Shiksha Parishad, Allahabad, U.P. and Ors., Per Dalveer Bhandari J., Civil Appeal No. 9595 of 2003, decided On: 21.08.2006, Supreme Court of India.)
- 2008: Delhi city government declares Jain community a minority per the Supreme Court Orders.
- 2014: Jain community is designated a minority at the national level.
- 2024: Death of Jain Acharya Vidyasagar ji Maharaj in February 2024

== See also ==
- History of Jainism
- Jain philosophy
- Śramaṇa
