= Jain Center of Central Ohio =

Jain temple in Ohio, United States

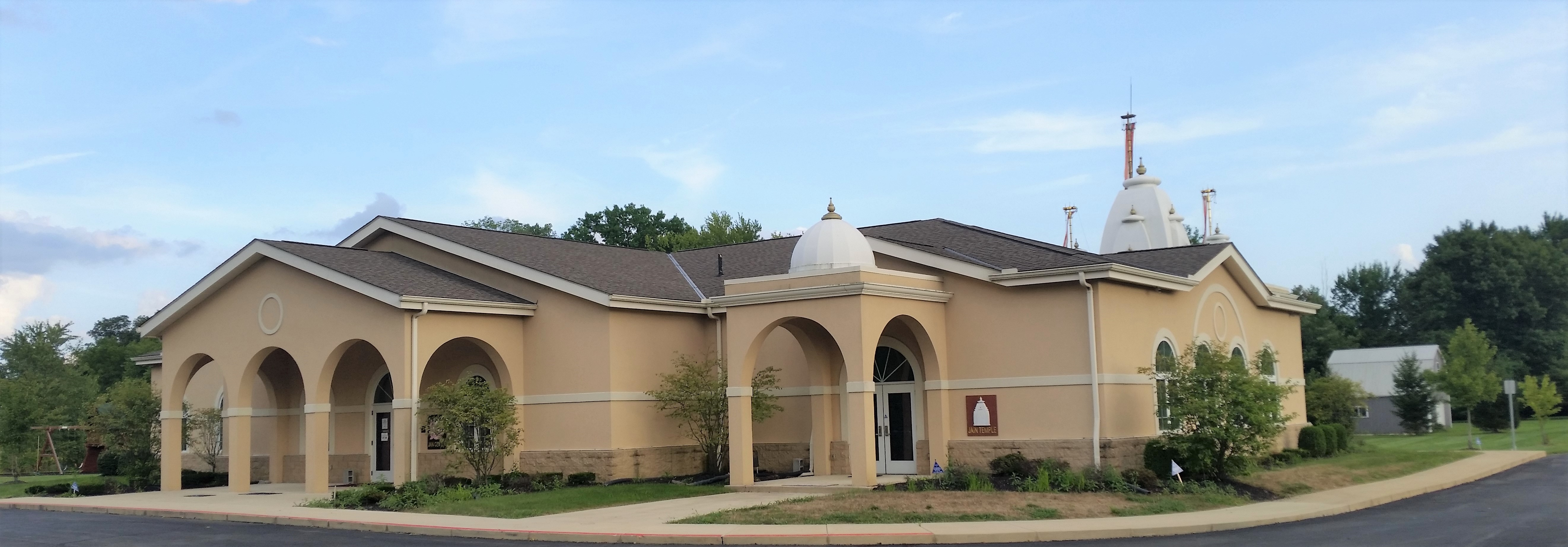

- Location in Ohio

Religion
- Affiliation: Jainism
- Deity: Mahavira
- Status: Open

Location
- Location: 6683 South Old State Road, Lewis Center, Ohio 43035
- Country: United States
- Coordinates: 40°11′04″N 82°59′25″W

Architecture
- Founder: Jain Center of Central Ohio
- Completed: 2012

Website
- jcoco.org

The Jain Center of Central Ohio is a Jain temple in Lewis Center, Ohio. It opened in 2012 and is the first Jain temple in the Columbus metropolitan area. Its significance has been recognized with an Ohio Historical Society marker.

== History ==
In the 1980s, a group of Columbus-area Jains started meeting for worship. They first gathered in their homes, and later in local Hindu temples. In 1991, they founded the Jain Center of Central Ohio organization with the goal of building a temple. In 1992, the group started raising funds to construct the temple. Temple construction began on October 15–16, 2011. The temple was dedicated and opened to the public on July 19–23, 2012. The opening ceremonies included blessings from religious leaders, cultural programs, a lamp lighting, a procession, and other rituals. Around 700 people attended the inauguration.

== Architecture ==
The temple is a steeple-and-dome building lined with large windows. It has marble floors and 7,600 square feet of interior space. It contains a main sanctum with statues of deities, a secondary worship area, classrooms, a library, a multi-purpose area, and a yoga/meditation area.

== See also ==
- Jainism in America
