= Saman Suttam =

1974 religious text

Information
- Religion: Jainism
- Period: 1974

Saman Suttam is the religious text created in 1974 by a committee consisting of representatives of each of the major sects of Jainism, Digambaras and Svetambaras, to reconcile the teachings of the sects. After a gap of about nearly two thousand years following composition of Tattvartha Sutra by Acharya Umasvati this was the first text to be recognized by all Jain sects. At Umaswati's time, although multiple orders existed, there was no clear sectarian division. By the 20th century however, Jainism had gradually been divided into several sects. For someone to compile a text at this time, and for it to be approved by all sects, was an exceptional event.

Kshullak Jinendra Varni compiled a book, drawing from the original Prakrit (Ardhamagadhi etc.) texts, and as a result of efforts undertaken by Vinoba Bhave. It was critically examined by several monks of different orders including Muni (now Acharya) Vidyanandaji, Muni (later Acharya) Sushil Kumarji, Muni Janakavijaya, Muni Nathamal (later Acharya Mahaprajna), as well as scholars like A.N. Upadhye, Darbari Lal Kothia, Agarachand Nahta, et al. Finally in an assembly on 12 December 1974 it was approved by all.

The text of Saman Suttam (its title referring to sayings of Sramans) includes 44 chapters with topics such as Mangal Sutra (on auspiciousness), Atma Sutra (on the soul), Moksha Marga Sutra (on the path to liberation), and is divided into four sections. Its 756 verses are compiled from Jain scriptures. Whence, as sourced, the textual content originates from the same age as the scripture it consolidates (printed over the years in English, Gujarati, Hindi, and Italian).

Whether it has been widely distributed and taught among sects, in place of traditional texts (which vary to the extent an oral tradition has been considered lost or not), Jain scholars have maintained that this work embodies essential principles of the Jain religion and philosophy, comprehensive as a textbook (though relatively brief as a body of work), the Saman Suttam (like the Tattvartha Sutra) is universal to the Jain religion, for what its followers share in common.

Contents (Saman Suttam, 2nd ed. 1999)

Part I, Source of Illumination

1. Precepts on the Auspicious
2. Precepts on the Jina's Teachings
3. Precepts on the Religious Order
4. Precepts on the Scriptural Exposition
5. Precepts on the Transmigratory Cycle
6. Precepts on the Karmas
7. Precepts on the Wrong faith
8. Precepts on the Renunciation of Attachment
9. Precepts on the Religion
10. Precepts on the Self-restraint
11. Precepts on the Non-possessiveness
12. Precepts on the Non-violence
13. Precepts on the Vigilance
14. Precepts on the Education
15. Precepts on the Soul

Part II, Path of Liberation

16. Precepts on the Path of Liberation
17. Precepts on Three Jewels
18. Precepts on Right Faith
19. Precepts on Right Knowledge
20. Precepts on Right Conduct
21. Precepts on Spiritual Realization
22. Precepts on the Two Paths of Religion
23. Precepts on Householder's Religion
24. Precepts on Religion of Monks
25. Precepts on Vows
26. Precepts on Carefulness and Self-Control
27. Precepts on Obligatory Duties
28. Precepts on Penance
29. Precepts on Meditation
30. Precepts on Reflection
31. Precepts on Soul-colouring
32. Precepts on Spiritual Progress
33. Precepts on Passionless Death

Part III, Metaphysics

34. Precepts on Fundamental
35. Precepts on Substance
36. Precepts on Universe

Part IV, Theory of Relativity

37. Precepts on Non-absolutism
38. Precepts on Valid Knowledge
39. Precepts on View-point
40. Precepts on Theory of Relativity and Seven Predictions
41. Precepts on Reconciliation or Synthesis
42. Precepts on Installation
43. Conclusion
44. Hymn to Mahavira
