= Jain Center of Greater Phoenix =

Jain temple in Phoenix, Arizona

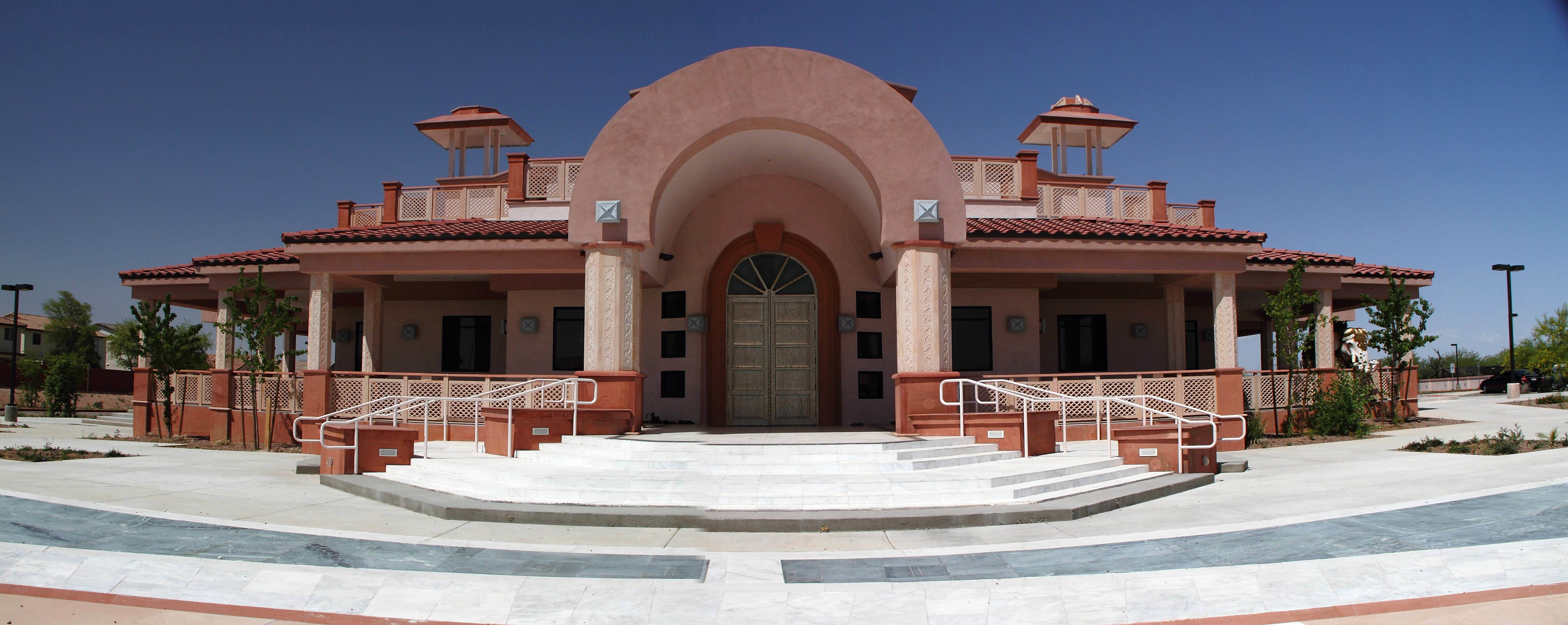
- Jain Center of Greater Phoenix

- Location within Arizona

Religion
- Affiliation: Jainism
- Deity: Mahavira, Rishabhanatha
- Governing body: Jain Center of Greater Phoenix

Location
- Location: Phoenix, Arizona, United States
- Coordinates: 33.38960921°N 112.10774657°W

Architecture
- Established: 2008
- Temple: 1

Website
- www.jcgp.org

Jain Center of Greater Phoenix (JCGP) is a Jain temple in Phoenix, Arizona. It was established in 2008. It represents about 150 families in the Phoenix metro area.

== History ==
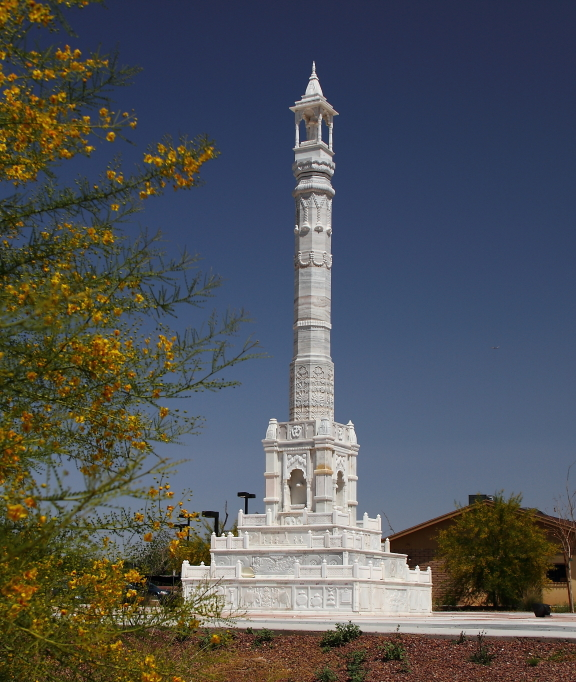
Manastambha at Jain Center of Greater Phoenix (JCGP)

Of the total Jain population in Phoenix, about half live in the East Valley. Most arrived in the 1980s, at which time they did not have a permanent meeting place and met in local elementary schools.

In 2005, JCGP acquired 4 acres of land for building a Jain Temple in Phoenix. Pratistha event was held from December 20 to December 26, 2008. The temple is located at 6250 S. 23rd Ave. The Hindu community also has a temple on another four acres next to the Jain Center, known as the Shree Nathji temple.

== Architecture ==
The building uses white Makrana marble on the inside. The primary deities have been brought in from India, 51-inch high statues of Mahavir and Adinath. Behind the primary deities, 24 inches have been carved out to include 15-inch-high statues of tirthankars. Above the sanctum sanctorum, a 61 feet pinnacle or shikhara has been constructed.

The entrance of the temple includes a sandstone archway and a 41-foot Manastambha (nonviolence monument) stands outside the temple.

== Gallery ==
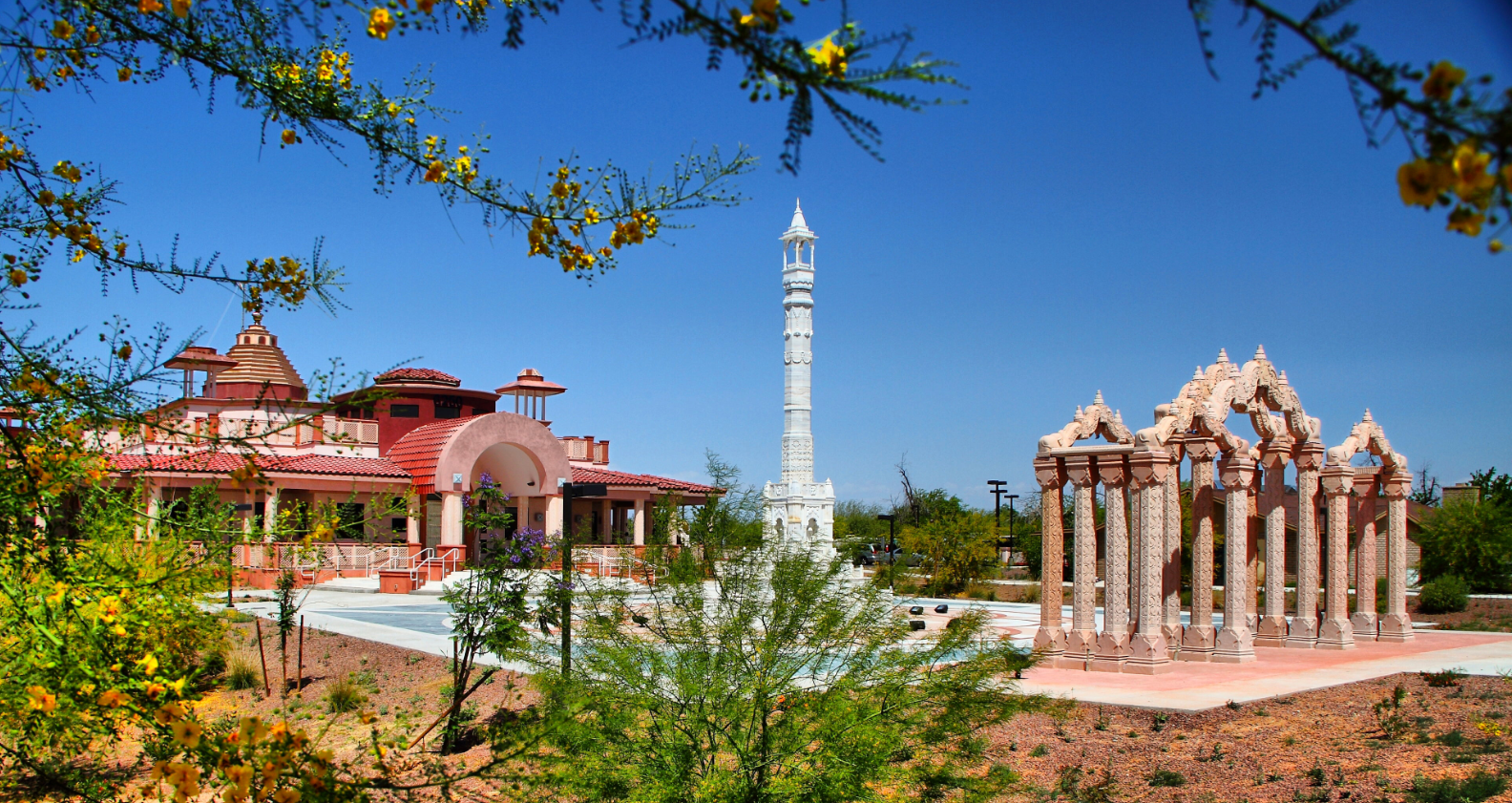
Exteriors of the Jain temple in Phoenix, Arizona

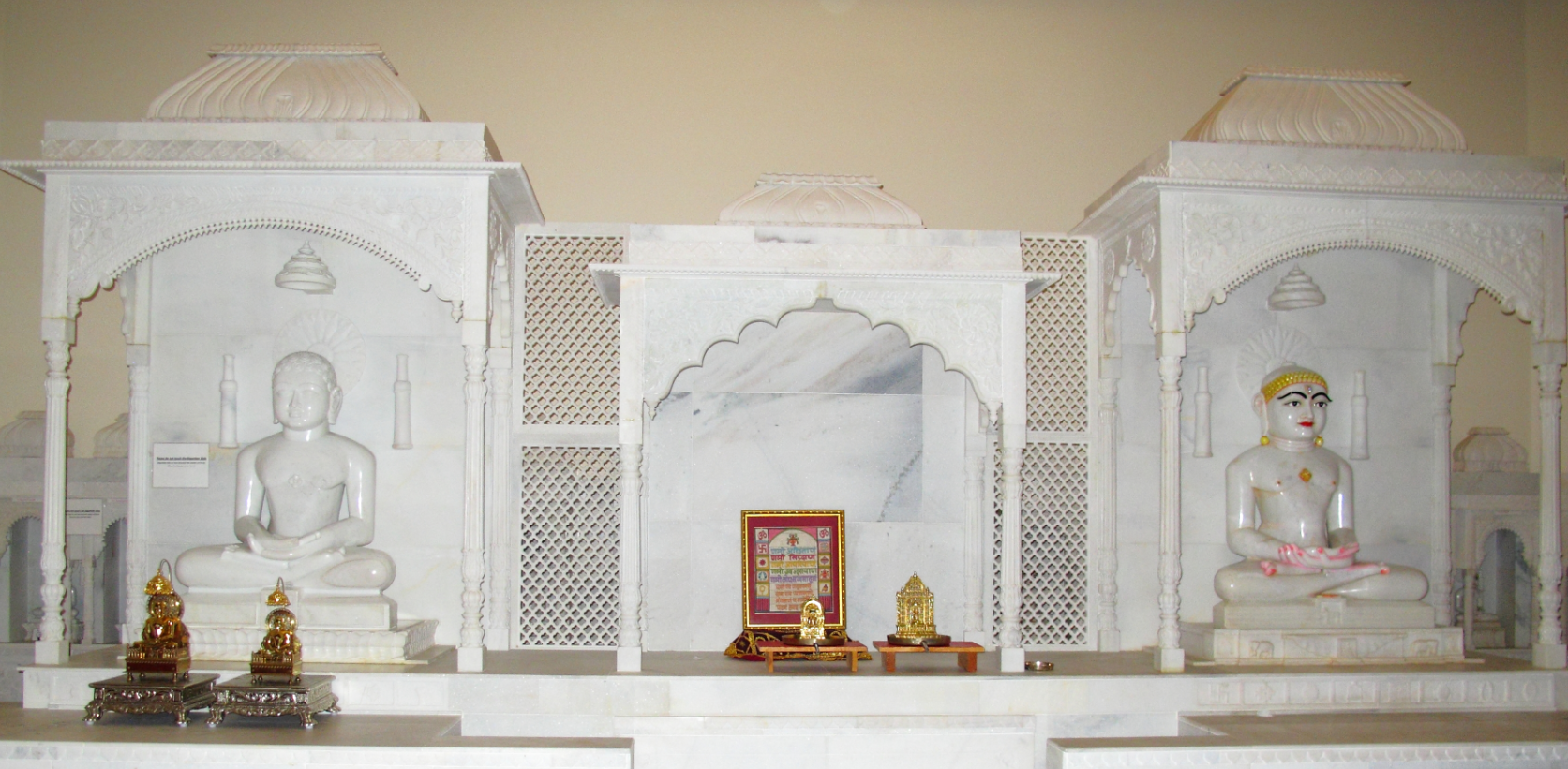
Both Digambar and Śvetāmbara statues are placed in the same sanctum sanctorum

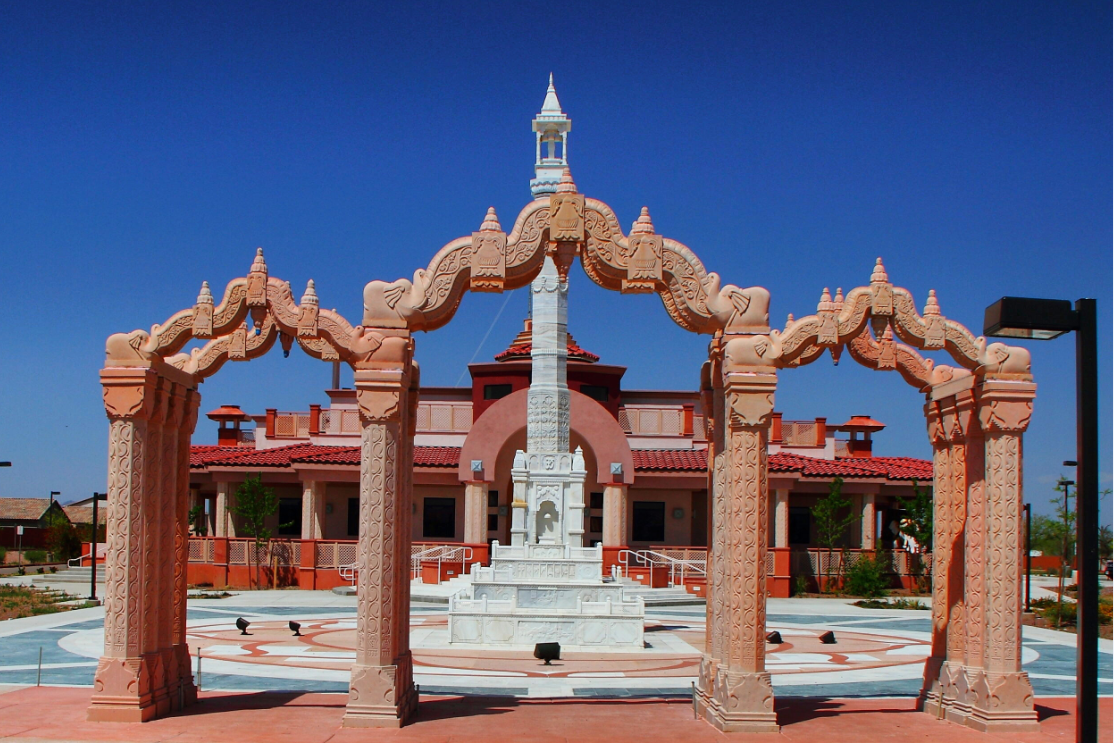
Front entrance of the Jain temple

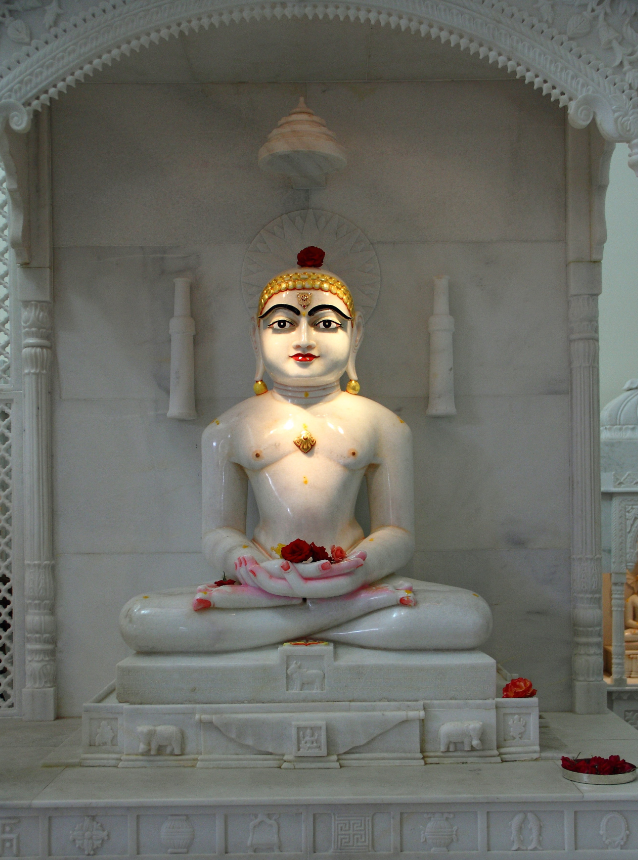
Rishabhantha idol

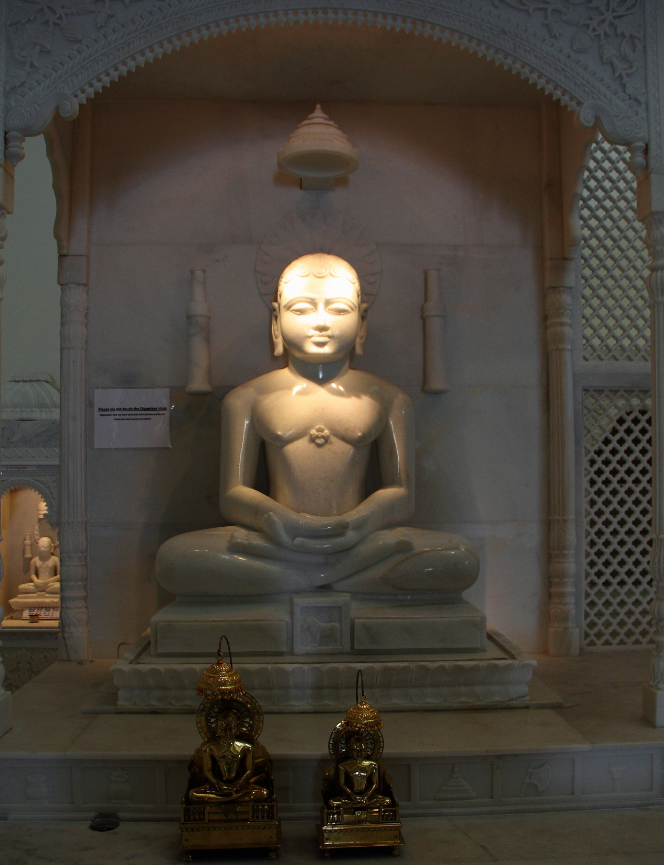
Mahavir Swami idol

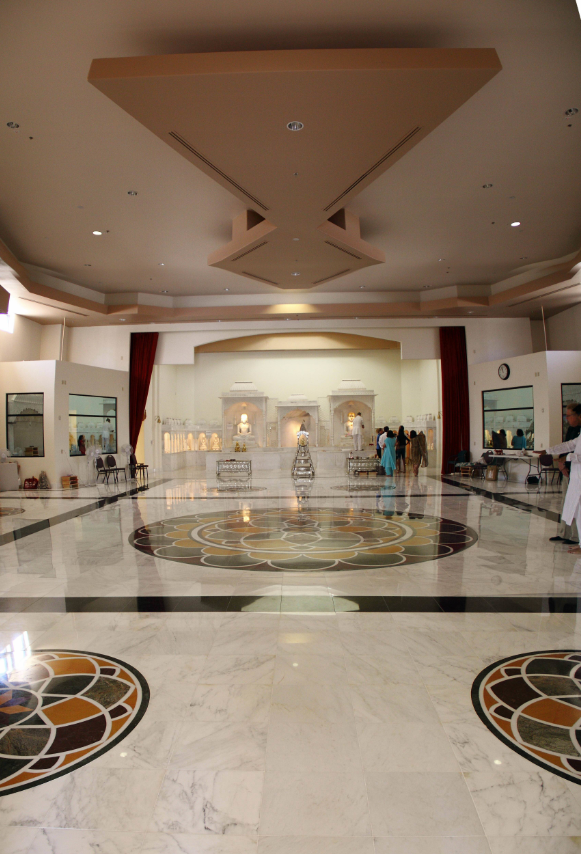
Main vedi

== See also ==
- Jainism in America
- Jain Center of America
- Brampton Jain Temple
