= Sushil Kumar (Jain monk) =

Indian Jain monk

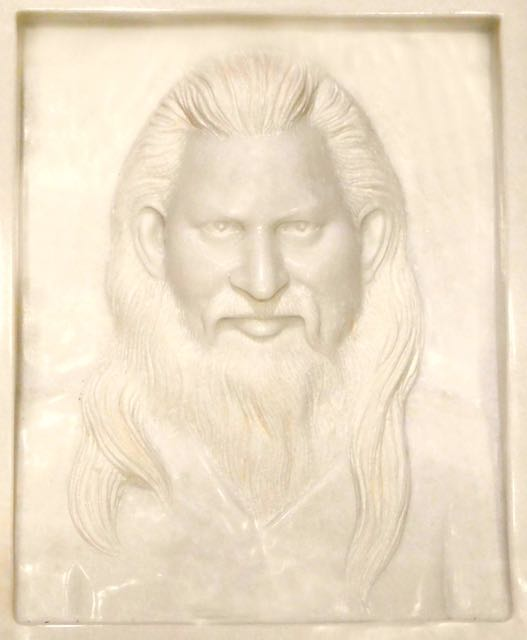
- Picture of a marble plaque showing Sushil Kumar

Personal life
- Born: 15 June 1926
- Died: 22 April 1994 (aged 67)

Religious life
- Religion: Jainism
- Sect: Śvētāmbara; non-sectarian Sthānakavāsī; Arhat Sangh

Sushil Kumar (15 June 1926–22 April 1994), known as Guruji by his devotees) was a Sthānakavāsī Jain teacher, monk, and Acharya (instructor in religious matters). He was a self-realised master who devoted more than 50 years to promoting non-violence, peace, and knowledge of the self.

== Early life and education ==
Kumar was born into a Brahmin household on 15 June 1926 in Sikhopur, a small foothill village in Haryana, India, although the village was later named Sushilgarh in Kumar's honor. At the age of seven he left his home to live with Shri Chotelalji Maharaj, who later became his religious guru.

According to Kumar, when he was a young boy a yogi and Jain master named Roop Chandji Maharaj appeared to him in spirit and told him to become a monk. Later, when he was 15 years old, he became a Jain Muni (monk) in the Swetamber Sthānakavāsī sect, where his knowledge was realised through direct experience and his powers were awakened through the grace of past lives.

During his academic career in India he mastered the classical studies of Indian religious and yogic philosophies and passed through a number of examinations such as Shastri, Sahitya-Ratna, Vidya-Ratna, and Acharya, being declared an "Acharya" (master) of Arhat Sangh of the Jain tradition on 1 March 1980.

== Life as a monk ==
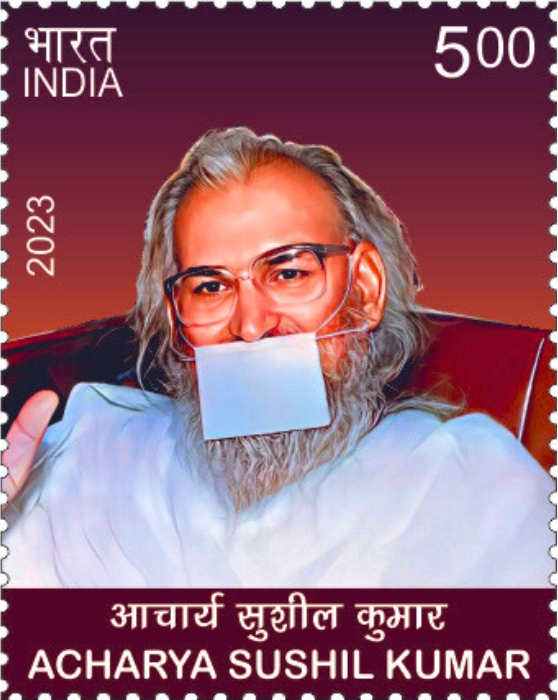
Sushil Kumar on a 2023 stamp of India

As a Jain monk Kumar travelled thousands of miles on foot across the length and breadth of India. Initially he represented the Sthānakavāsī Jain tradition in the making of Saman Suttam, a compilation of Jain principles that was acceptable to all sects of Jainism.

Kumar was a master of meditation and he used Arhum yoga as his teaching system. An ancient system of the mastery of the inner self through watchfulness and direct perception, Arhum yoga encompasses all aspects of philosophy and yogic practice in the Arihant spiritual tradition. Kumar was also a master of the science of sound and discovered and mastered the secrets of the sounds behind the Namokar Mantra, writing a book on the subject entitled Song of the Soul which is central to Jains.

Although Kumar was ordained as a monk in the Sthānakavāsī Jain tradition he regarded himself to be non-sectarian, and in 1979 he formed Arhat Sangh, a syncretic non-sectarian group within Jainism.

== International travel ==
For as long as historical records have been available, Jain monks did not use any mechanical means for travel. However, on 17 June 1975 Kumar decided to travel outside India by plane, saying that he had been prompted to do so by the 12th-century Acharya, Dadaguru Manidhari Jinchandra Suriji Maharaj, during meditation. Dadaguru had asked him to travel to faraway lands to spread Bhagwan Mahavir's message of Ahimsa (non-injury) and Anekantavada (belief that no one has a monopoly on truth). His decision caused some controversy in the Jain community, but allowed other Jain monks and nuns to begin to use mechanical means of travel, including internationally.

Kumar subsequently travelled and taught extensively, spreading the message of non-violence and self-awareness across the globe. He founded many ashrams and centres in both the East and West, establishing the International Mahavira Jain Mission in 1983 in Blairstown, New Jersey to manage Siddhachalam, his primary ashram in North America. This made Kumar one of the founding fathers of American Jainism, with Siddhachalam regarded as the first Tirtha (site of pilgrimage) outside India.
