= Siddhachalam =

First Jain pilgrimage site located outside of India

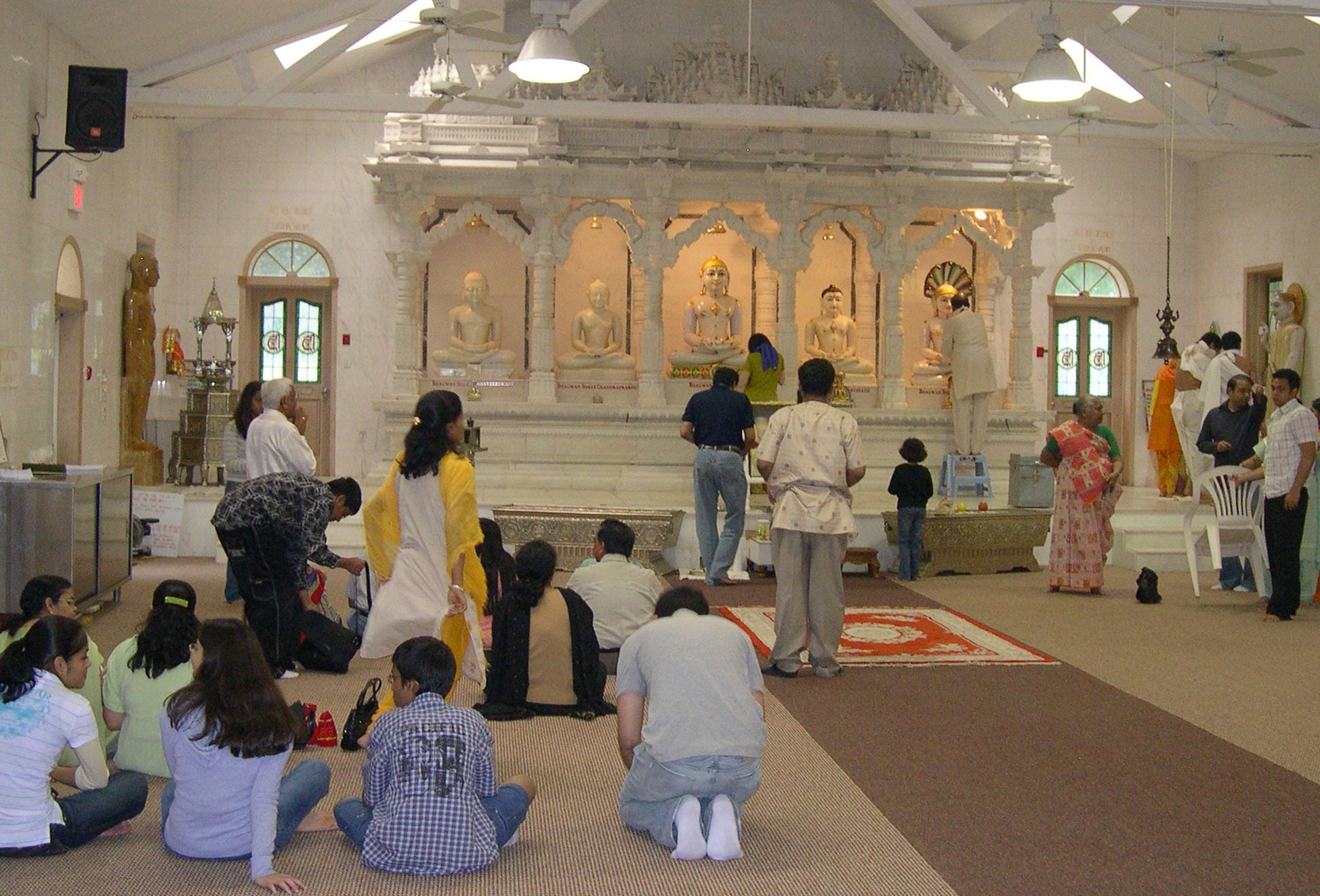
- The main temple at Siddhachalam, Digambara on the left and Śvētāmbara on the right

- Location within New Jersey Siddhachalam (the United States)

Religion
- Affiliation: Jainism
- Festival: Mahavir Jayanti

Location
- Location: 65 Mud Pond Road, Blairstown, New Jersey, United States
- Coordinates: 40.95478°N 74.95188°W

Architecture
- Creator: Sushil Kumarji
- Established: 1983
- Temple: 2

Website
- www.siddhachalam.org

Siddhachalam is the first Jain Tirtha (pilgrimage site) located outside of India. Founded in 1983 by Sushil Kumar, it is located on a 108-acre (44ha) site in rural New Jersey, United States. Siddhachalam (Hindi: siddha, liberated souls; achal, a permanent place, as a mountain) literally means the abode of liberated souls.

== History ==
In 1980, Sushil Kumar encouraged his disciples to acquire a long-abandoned children's summer camp and founded an ashram there to teach ahimsa. Kumar reportedly engaged there in extended samadhi meditation. Twelve years later, he encouraged the community to establish temples in homage to Jinas. The ashram maintains the only Jain monastery outside India. Siddhachalam has become an important center of Jain conferences and an important Jain pilgrimage. The center houses idols from all Jain sects, given that American Jains have sought to not bring in sectarian differences from India.

In 2012, Siddhachalam became the site for the world's first full-scale, complete replication of Shikharji, the most important place of pilgrimage for the Jains. Shikharji at Siddhachalam is the first Jain place of pilgrimage outside India.

The main temple has marble idols of the tirthankaras Rishabha, Pārśva, Mahāvīra, Chandraprabha and Shantinatha. There is also a small temple where the main idol is Pārśva.

The ashram is also a nature preserve and wildlife sanctuary.

== See also ==
- Brampton Jain Temple
- Jainism in the United States
