= Jainism in the United States =

American Jains
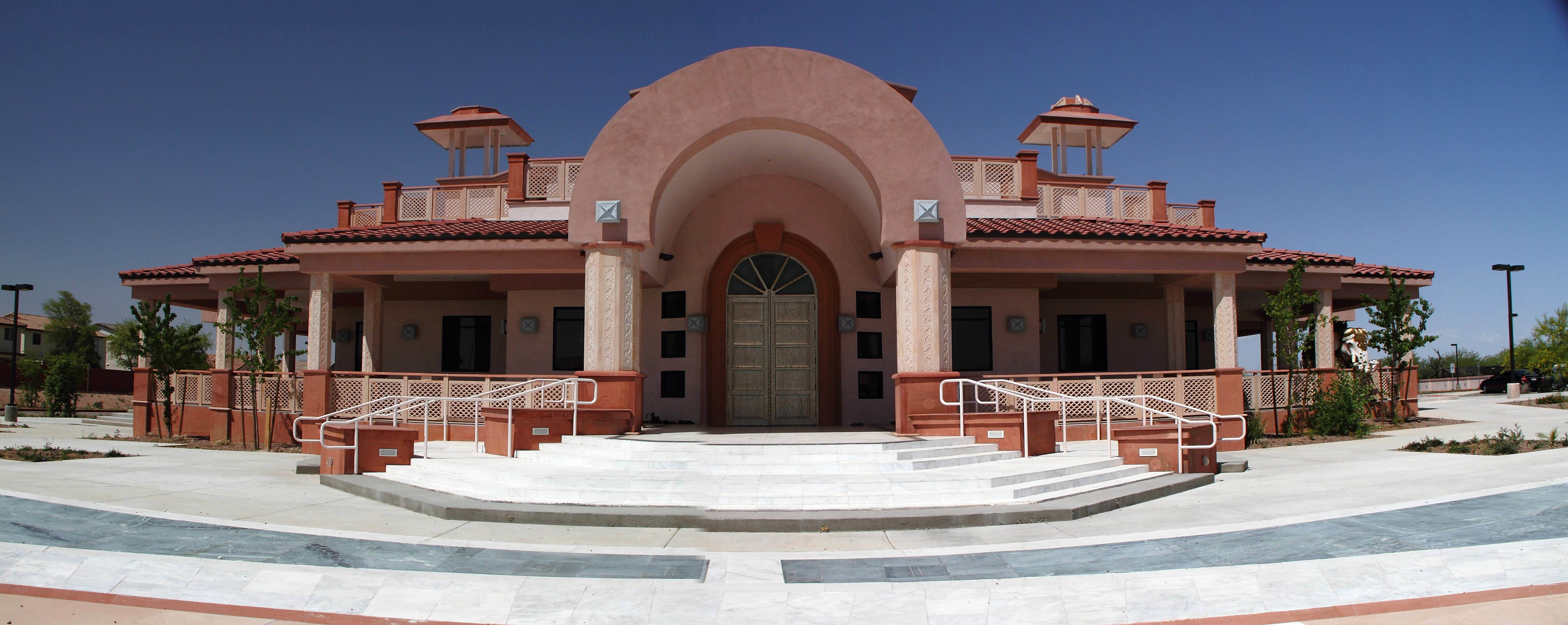
- Jain Center of Greater Phoenix

Total population
- 150,000

Religions
- Jainism

Languages
- American English; South Asian Languages

Related ethnic groups
- American Hindus; American Buddhists; American Sikhs

Adherents of Jainism first arrived in the United States in the 20th century. Jain immigration began in earnest in the late 1960s and continues to the present day.

== History ==
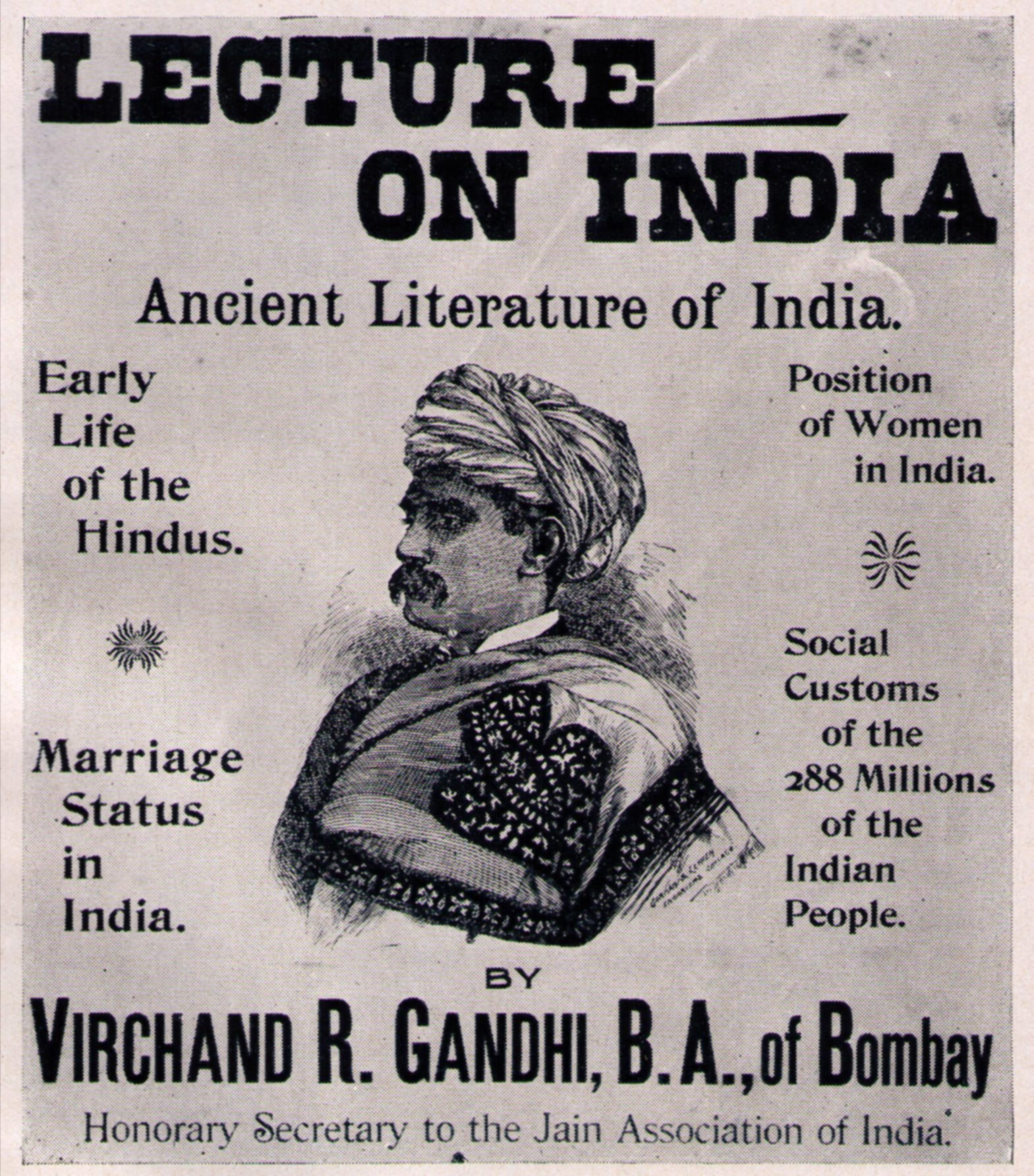
Poster announcing lecture by Virchand Gandhi

In 1893, Virachand Gandhi became the first Jain delegate to visit the United States, representing Jainism in the first ever Parliament of World Religions. As the first practicing Jain to speak publicly in the United States on Jainism, he is a key figure in the history of American Jainism. The first St. Louis Jain temple in the United States was built for the St. Louis World's Fair in 1904. After the fair, the temple moved to Las Vegas and later to Los Angeles. It is now owned by the Jain Center of Southern California. Adherents of Jainism first arrived in the United States in 1944. Jain immigration began in earnest in the late 1960s after the passage of the Immigration Act of 1965. The United States has since become a center of the Jain diaspora.

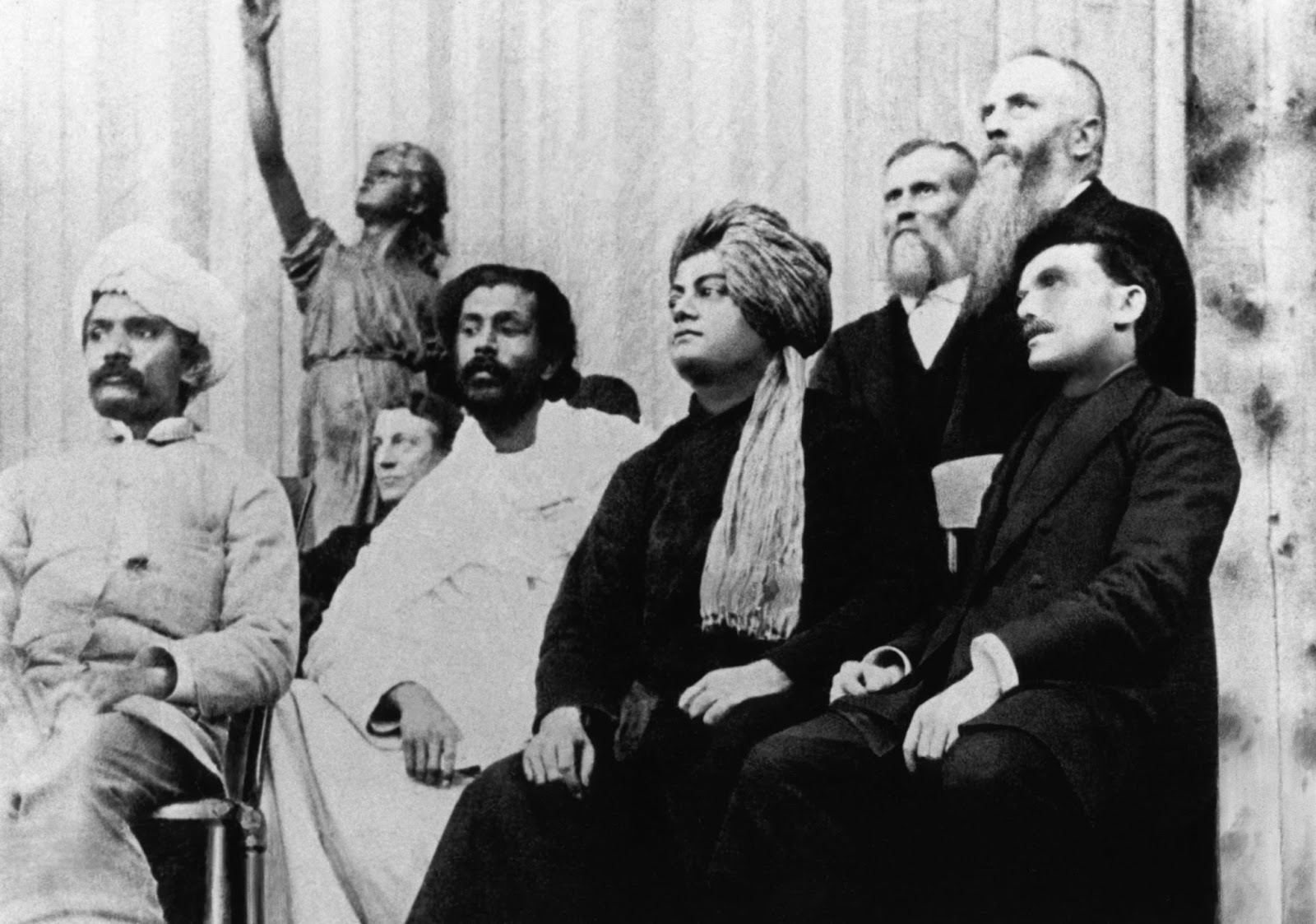
From left to right: Virchand Gandhi, Hewivitarne Dharmapala, Swami Vivekananda, and (possibly) G. Bonet Maury

The first former Jain monastic to travel to the United States, Chitrabhanu, arrived in 1971. He gave several lectures about Jainism at Harvard University and established a Jain center in New York City. The first monk who traveled outside India by use of mechanical means was Acharya Sushil Kumar who arrived in the United States in 1975. He established multiple Jain centers, including International Mahavira Jain Mission popularly known as Siddhachalam. In the 1980s, he and Chitrabhanu inspired the founding of Federation of Jain Associations in North America to support the Jain community in the United States and Canada.

As of 2010 the United States contained the most Jain temples of any country in the Jain diaspora. At least one-third of the Jains living outside India live in the United States, numbering close to 150,000. Jain temples in the United States, which numbered 26 as of 2006, frequently incorporate marble and arches in a style reminiscent of Rajasthan architecture. There are almost 100 distinct Jain congregations in the United States.

Many Jains in the United States are professionals. They also frequently volunteer at animal welfare organizations. Many Jains also attend Hindu temples and Hindu events.

== Jain sects ==
According to The Pluralism Project at Harvard University, "Most American Jains agree that the sectarian streams of Jainism that have been significant in India for 2,000 years are fast losing their currency in 20th century America...The sectarian divisions of the Jain tradition have been left behind as Jain Americans concentrate on the difficult task of appropriating the tradition in a new environment." As noted below, many Jain temples in the United States contain images from both the Digambara and Śvētāmbara traditions. Jain conventions and gatherings in America feature teachings from both sects.

== Federation of Jain Associations in North America and Siddhachalam ==
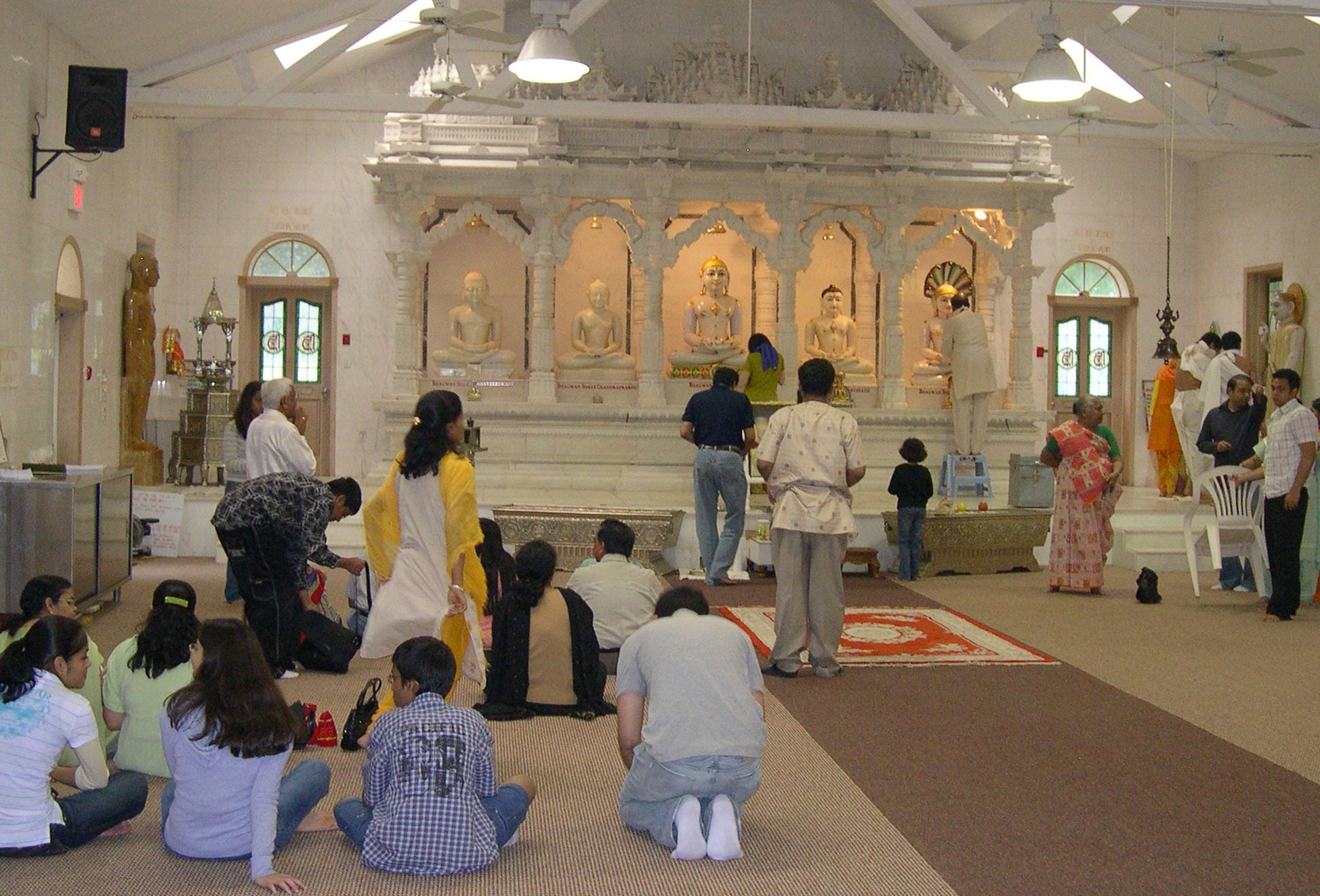
Main temple at Siddhachalam Jain center at New Jersey. Images of the tirthankaras Mahavira, Chandraprabha, Rishabha, Shantinatha and Parshvanatha.

The Federation of Jain Associations in North America is an umbrella organization of local American and Canadian Jain congregations to preserve, practice, and promote Jainism and the Jain way of life. Siddhachalam in New Jersey is the first pilgrimage site for Jains outside India, bringing together all Jains in one place for worship, study and reflection.

=== Jain symbols ===
The Federation of Jain Associations in North America uses a modified version of the standard Jain symbol, the Jain emblem. It replaces the swastika with an om because the former is not considered a pious symbol in the western world.

== Jain studies ==
Florida International University hosts the Bhagwan Mahavir Professorship in Jain Studies, the first Jain Studies chair at a North American university. In 2016, the Jain Society and Rice University signed a memorandum of understanding to establish a post-doctoral fellowship in Jain studies.

== American Jain centers ==
Category:Jain temples in the United States

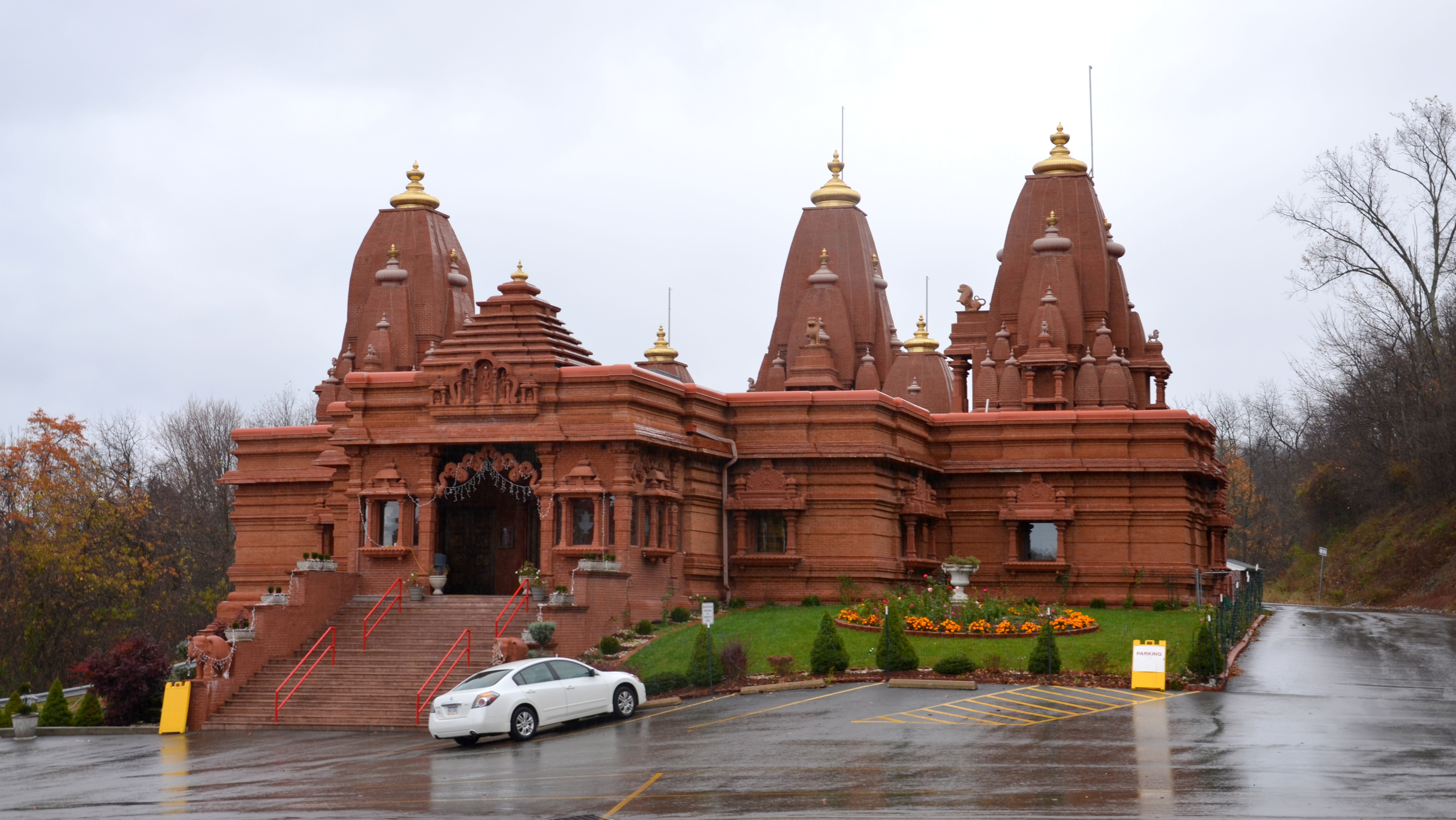
Jain temple in Monroeville, Pennsylvania

The Jain Center of America was the first Jain center in the United States. It opened in New York City in 1982. Since then, over 100 Jain centers and temples have opened in America. Most Jain centers are complexes that include a main temple housing Digambara and Śvētāmbara images, libraries, meeting rooms, guest rooms, and so forth.

=== Arizona ===
- Jain Center of Greater Phoenix

=== California ===
- Jain Center of Northern California
- Jain Center of Southern California
- Jain Center of Greater Sacramento
- Jain Society of San Diego
- Jain Center Of Los Angeles

=== Colorado ===
- Jain Samaj of Colorado, Denver

=== Connecticut ===
- Jain Center of Connecticut

=== Florida ===
- Jain Vishwa Bharati of USA, Orlando, Florida
- Jain Society Inc. of Tampa Bay
- Jain Society of Central Florida, Inc.
- Jain Center of South Florida
- Jain Association of North East Florida

=== Georgia ===
- Augusta Jain Community
- Jain Society of Greater Atlanta

=== Illinois ===
- Jain Society of Metro Chicago

=== Indiana ===
- Jain Center of Central Indiana

=== Kansas ===
- Kansas City Jain Sangh

=== Kentucky ===
- Jain Temple of Louisville

=== Louisiana ===
- Jain Center of Northwest Louisiana

=== Maryland ===
- Jain Society of Metro Washington

=== Massachusetts ===
- Jain Sangh of New England, Burlington, Massachusetts
- Jain Center of Greater Boston, Norwood, Massachusetts

=== Michigan ===
- Jain Society of Greater Detroit, Inc.
- Jain Society of Greater Lansing

=== Minnesota ===
- Jain Center of Minnesota

=== Missouri ===
- Jain Center of Greater St. Louis

=== Nevada ===
- Jain Center of Las Vegas

=== New Jersey ===
- Jain Center of New Jersey
- Jain Sangh of Atlantic City - NJ
- The Jain Sangh Inc. NJ (Cherry Hill Jain Sangh)
- Jain Vishwa Bharti, Iselin, New Jersey
- Siddhachalam, New Jersey

=== New York ===
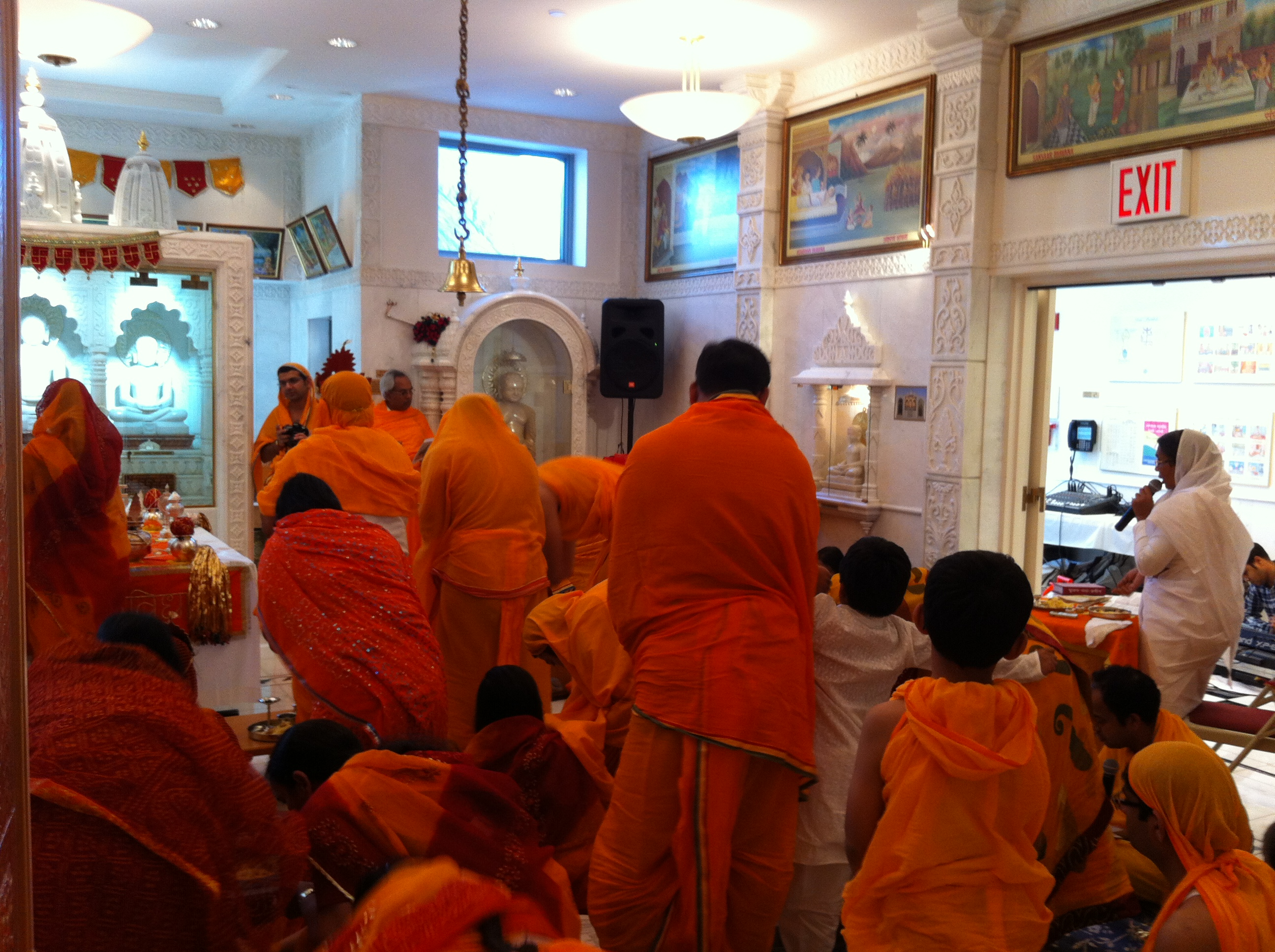
Das Lakshana (Paryushana) celebrations at the Jain Center of America, Queens, New York City, the oldest Jain temple in the Western Hemisphere

- Jain Center of America
- Jain Community of Buffalo
- Jain Sangh of Hudson Valley
- Jain Society of Capitol District-Albany
- Jain Samaj of Long Island, NY
- Jain Temple of New York

=== North Carolina ===
- Jain Center of Greater Charlotte
- Jain Study Center of N. Carolina

=== Ohio ===
- Jain Center of Central Ohio, Columbus
- Jain Center of Cincinnati/Dayton
- Jain Society of Greater Cleveland
- Jain Society of Toledo

=== Oklahoma ===
- Tulsa Jain Sangh

=== Pennsylvania ===
- Jain Center of Allentown
- Jain Samaj of South Central PA
- Jain Society of Pittsburgh
- Samarpan Jain Sangh Philadelphia

=== Tennessee ===
- Jain Society of Middle Tennessee

=== Texas ===
- Jain Society of Houston
- Jain Society of N. Texas/Dallas
- Jain Sangh of Greater Austin TX
- Siddhayatan

=== Virginia ===
- Jain Society of Central Virginia - Richmond
- Jain Temple of Virginia

=== Washington ===
- Jain Society of Seattle
- Jain Center of Washington

=== Wisconsin ===
- Jain Religion Center of Wisconsin

== Gallery ==
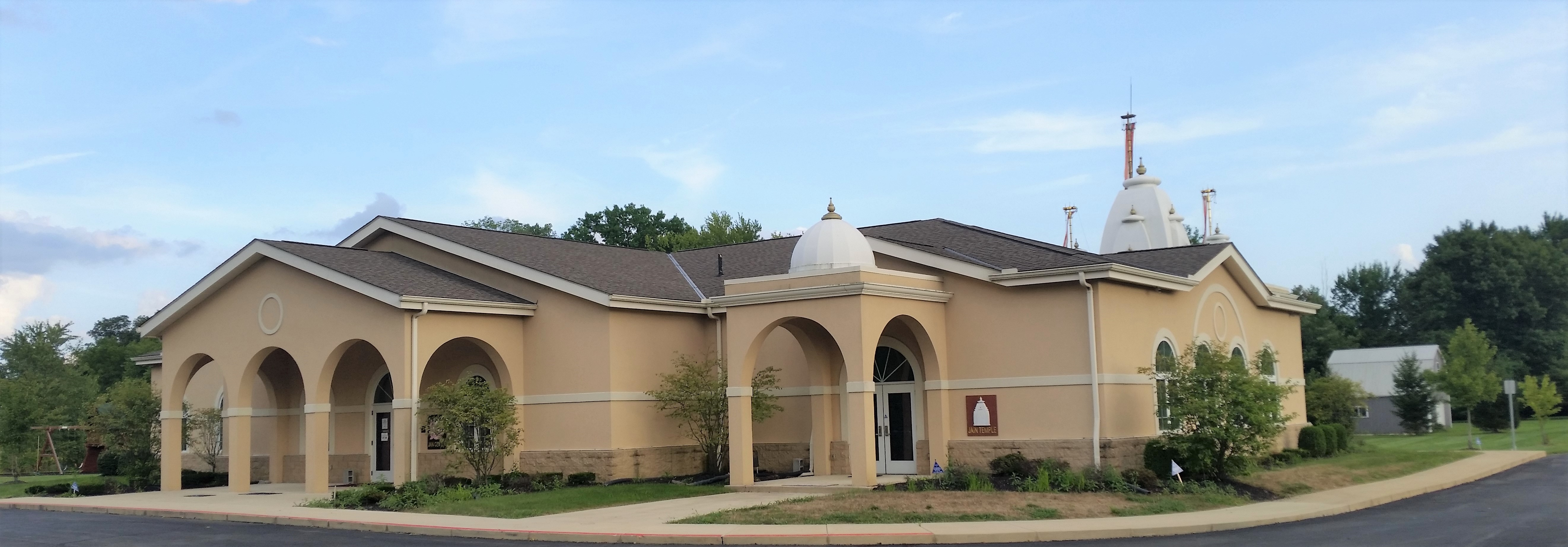
Jain Center of Central Ohio, Columbus, Ohio

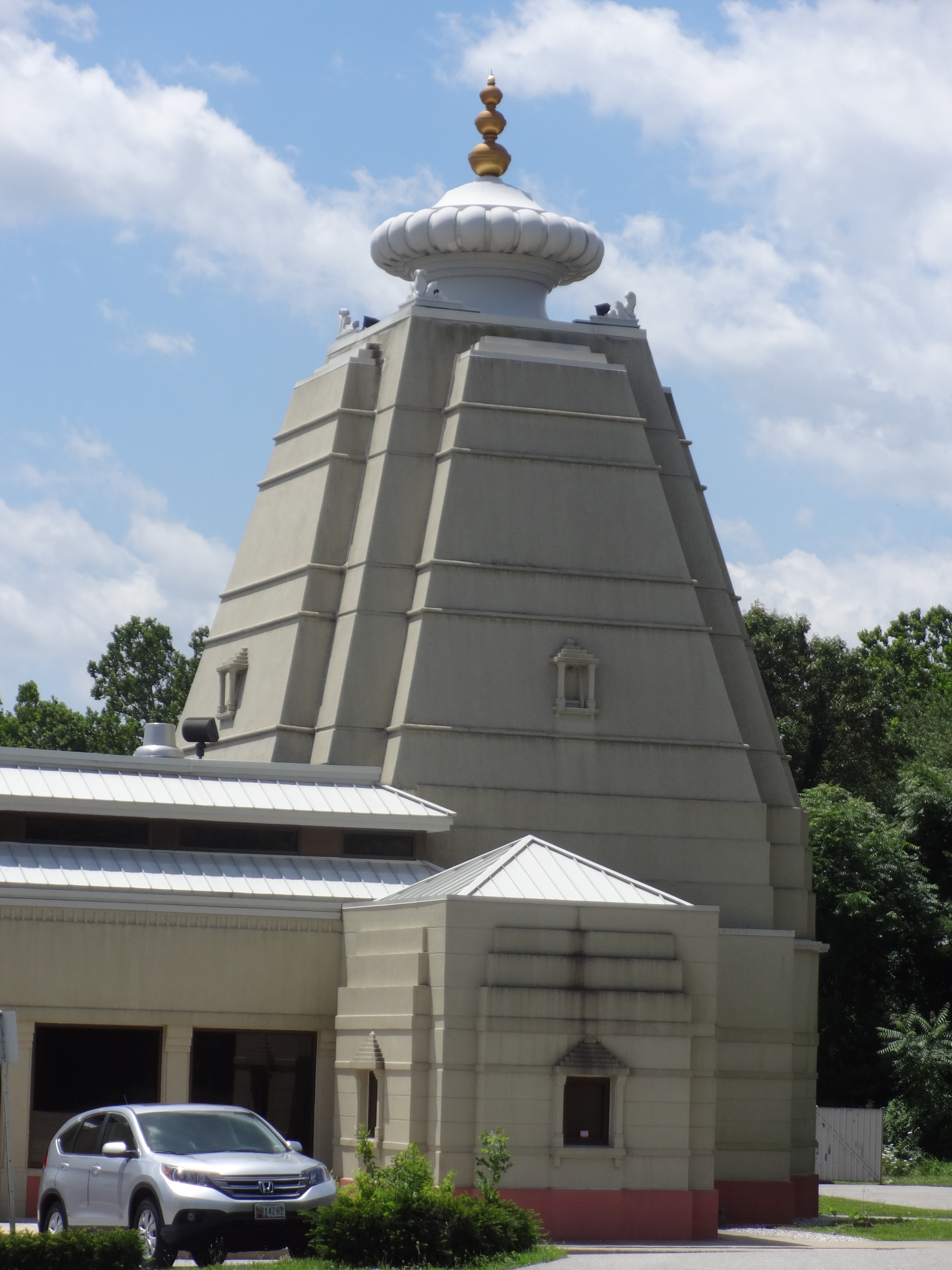
Greater Baltimore Jain Temple

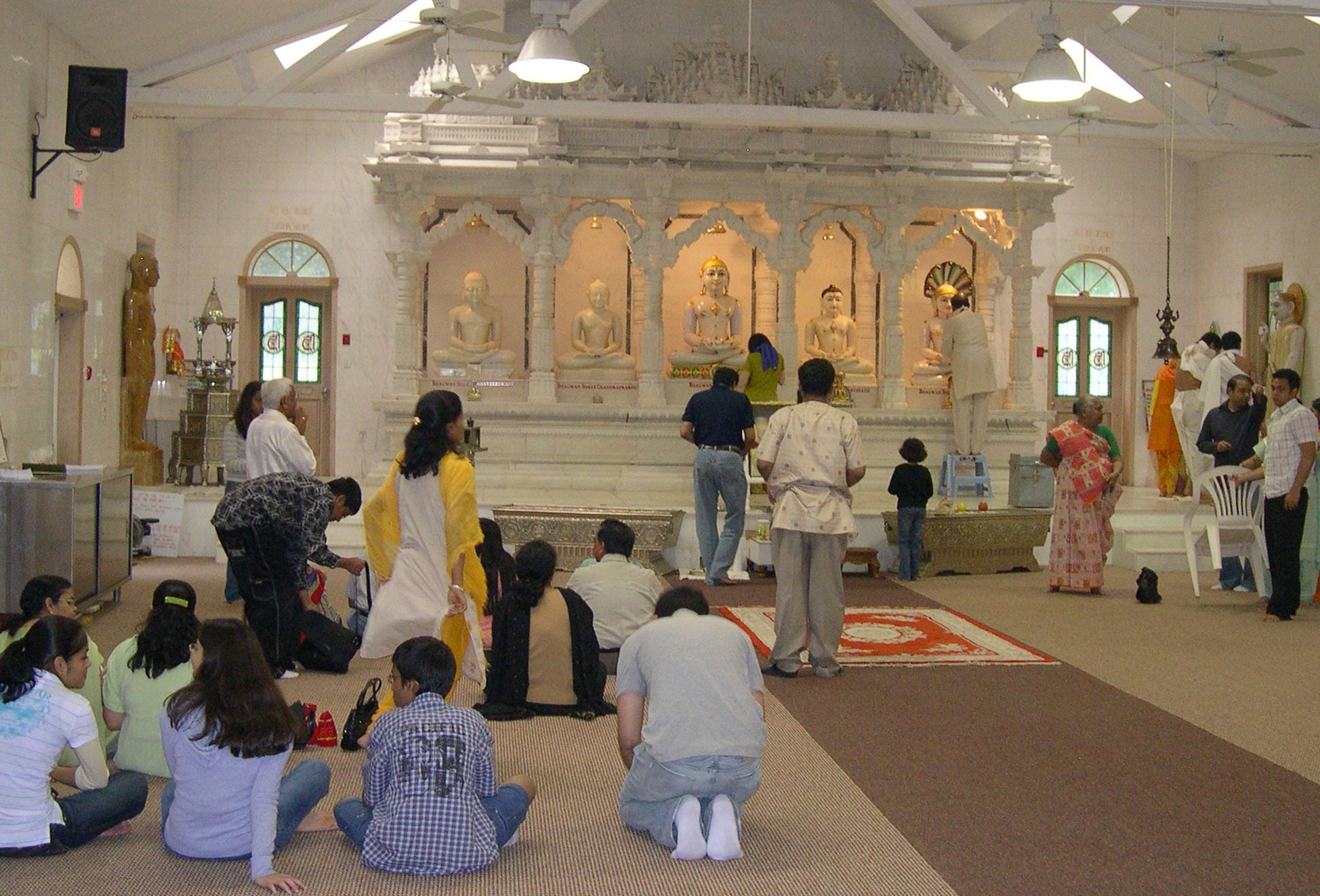
Main shrine at Siddhachalam Jain Center, New Jersey

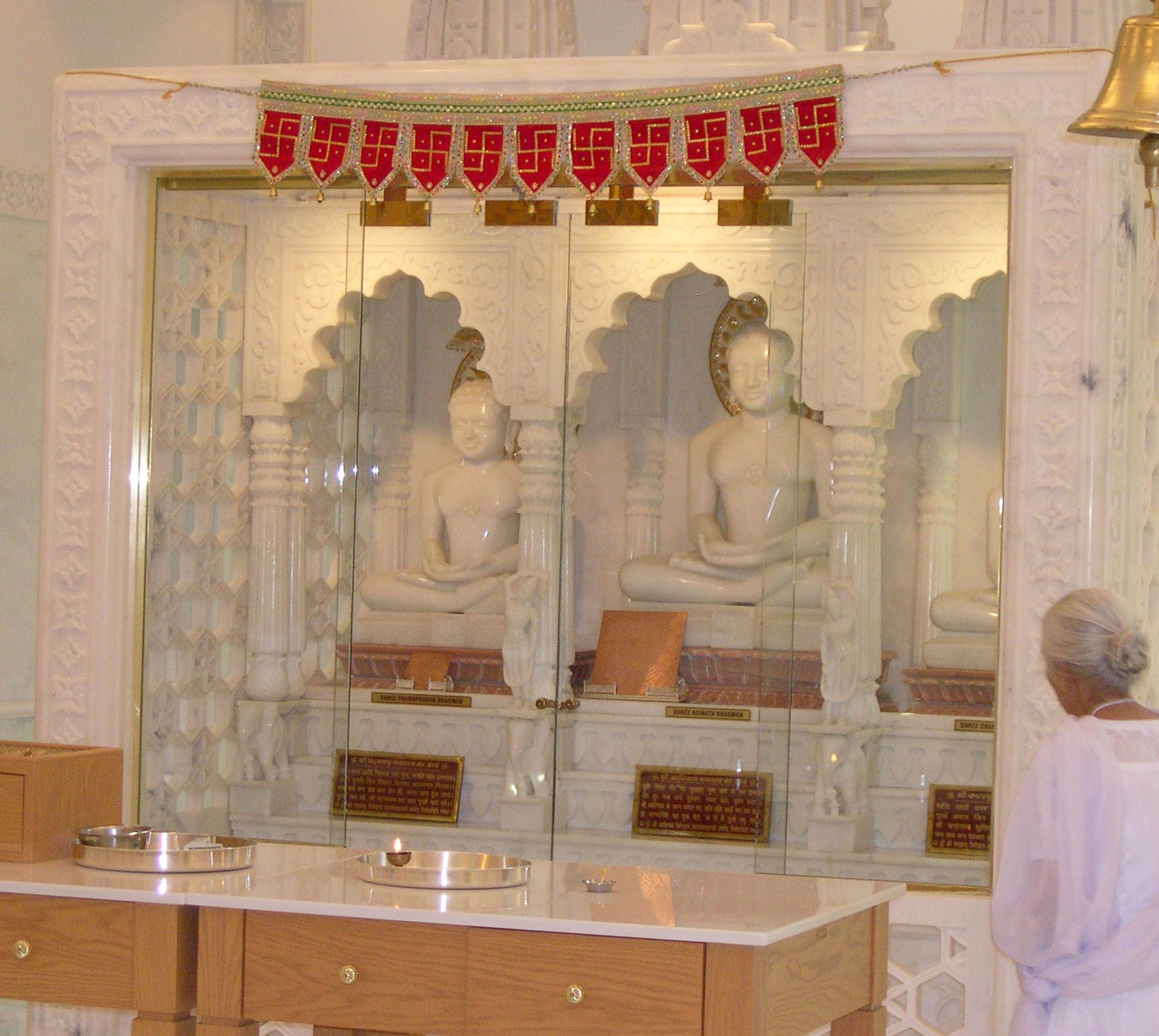
Jain Center of America in New York City with images of Tirthankaras

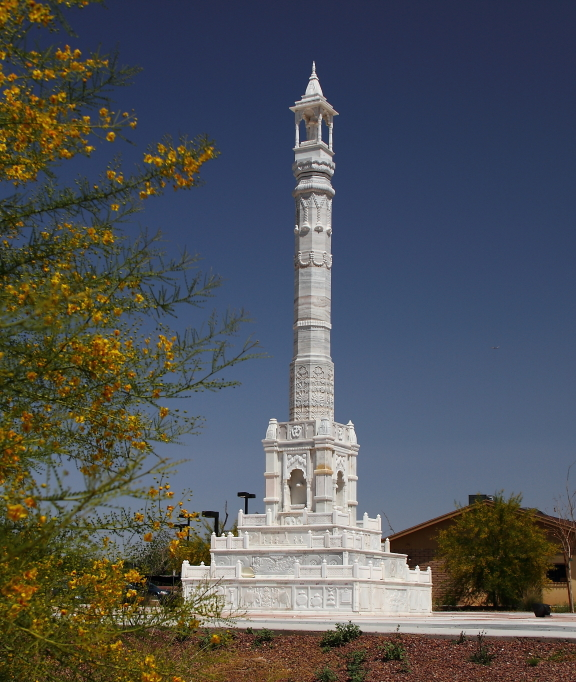
Manastambha at Jain Center of Greater Phoenix

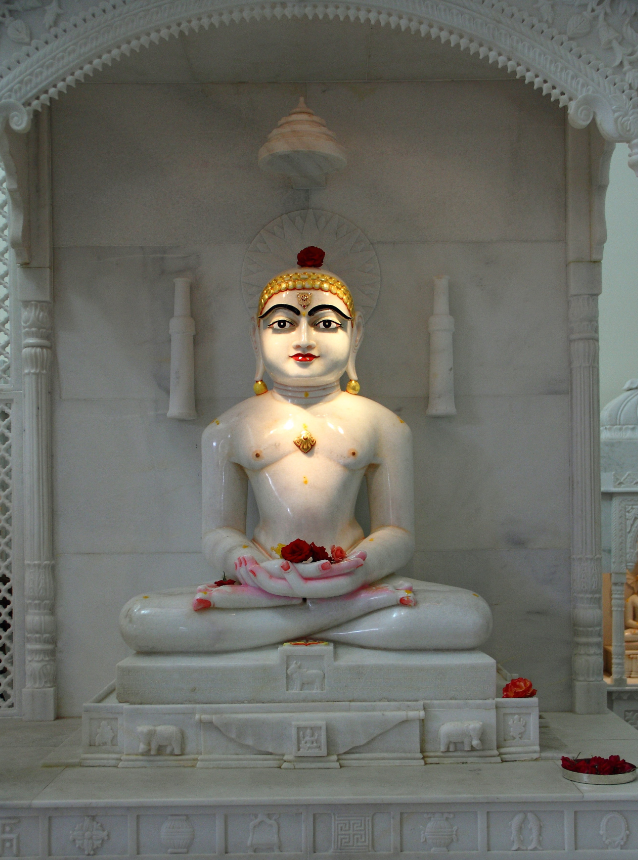
Rishabhantha idol at Jain Center of Greater Phoenix

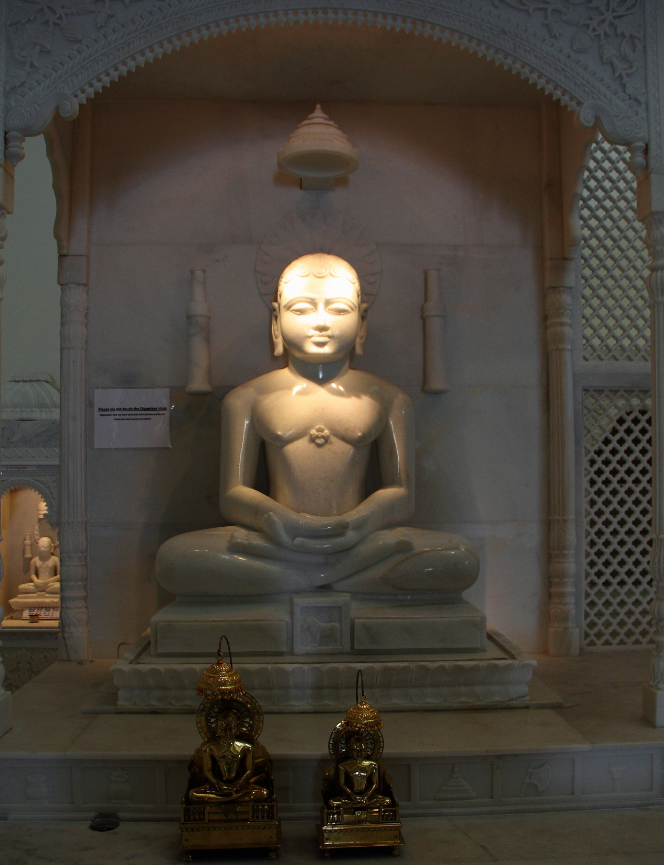
Mahavira idol at Jain Center of Greater Phoenix

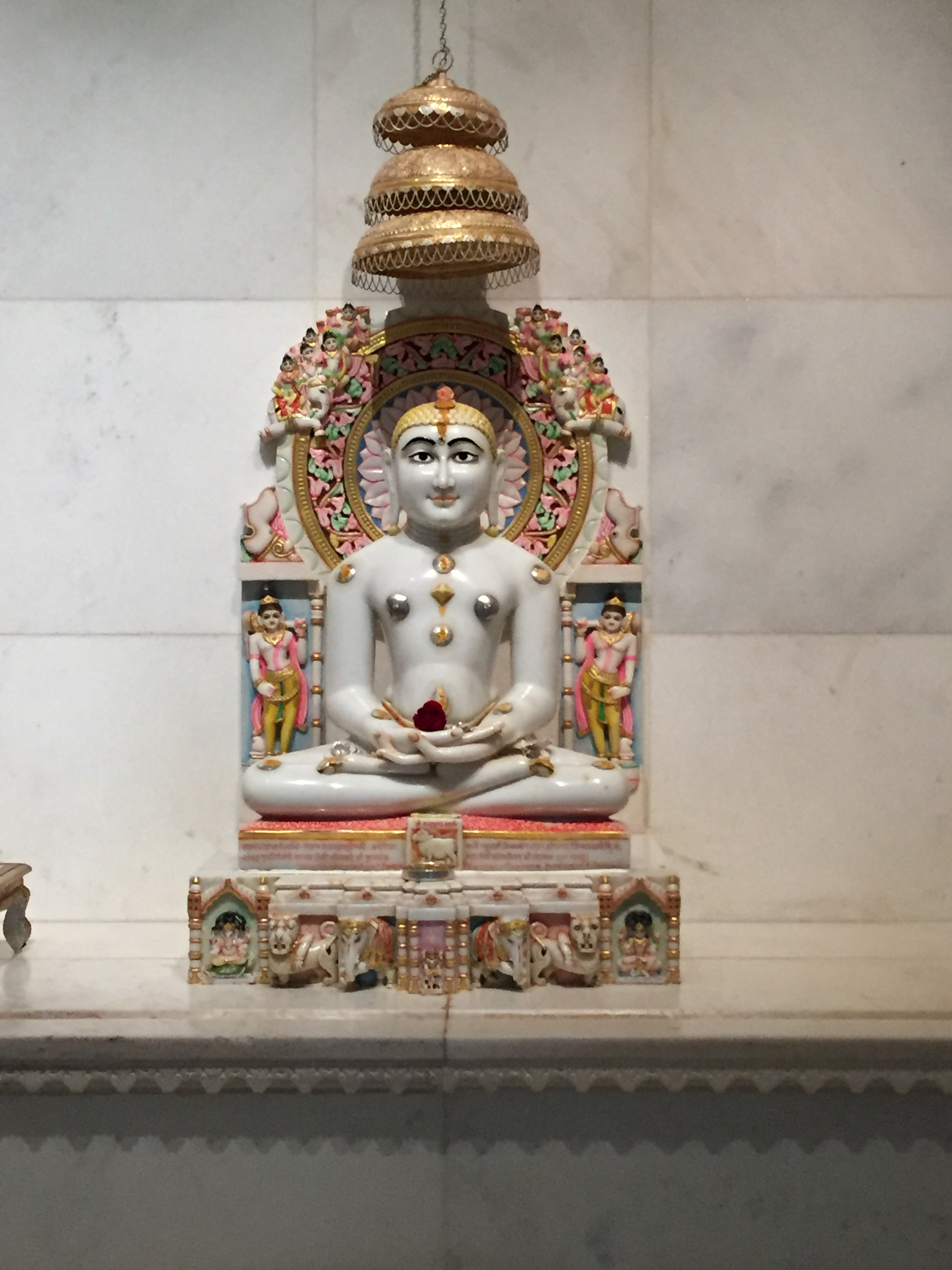
Adinatha at the Franklin Township Derasar

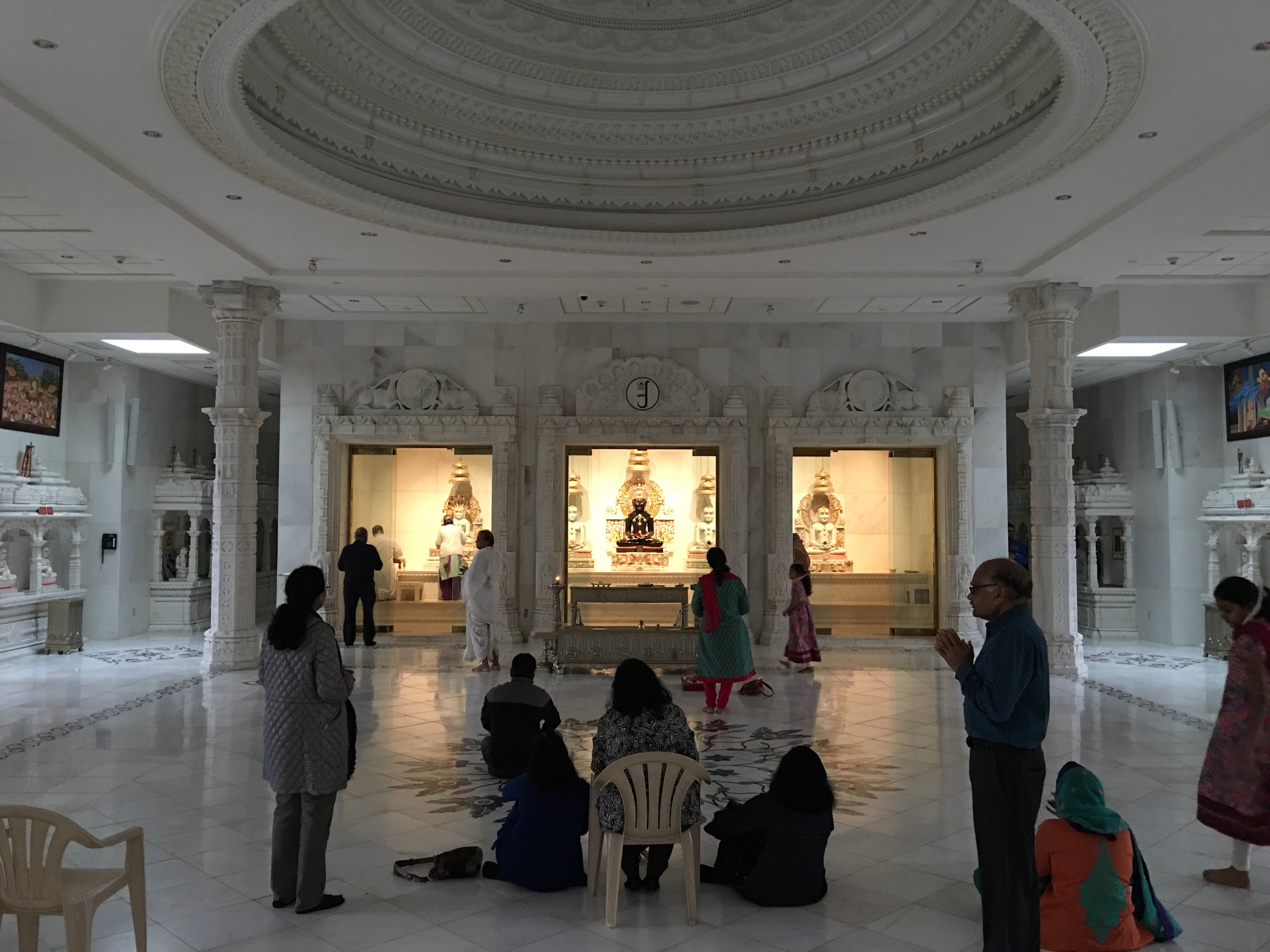
Main vedi at the Franklin Township Derasar

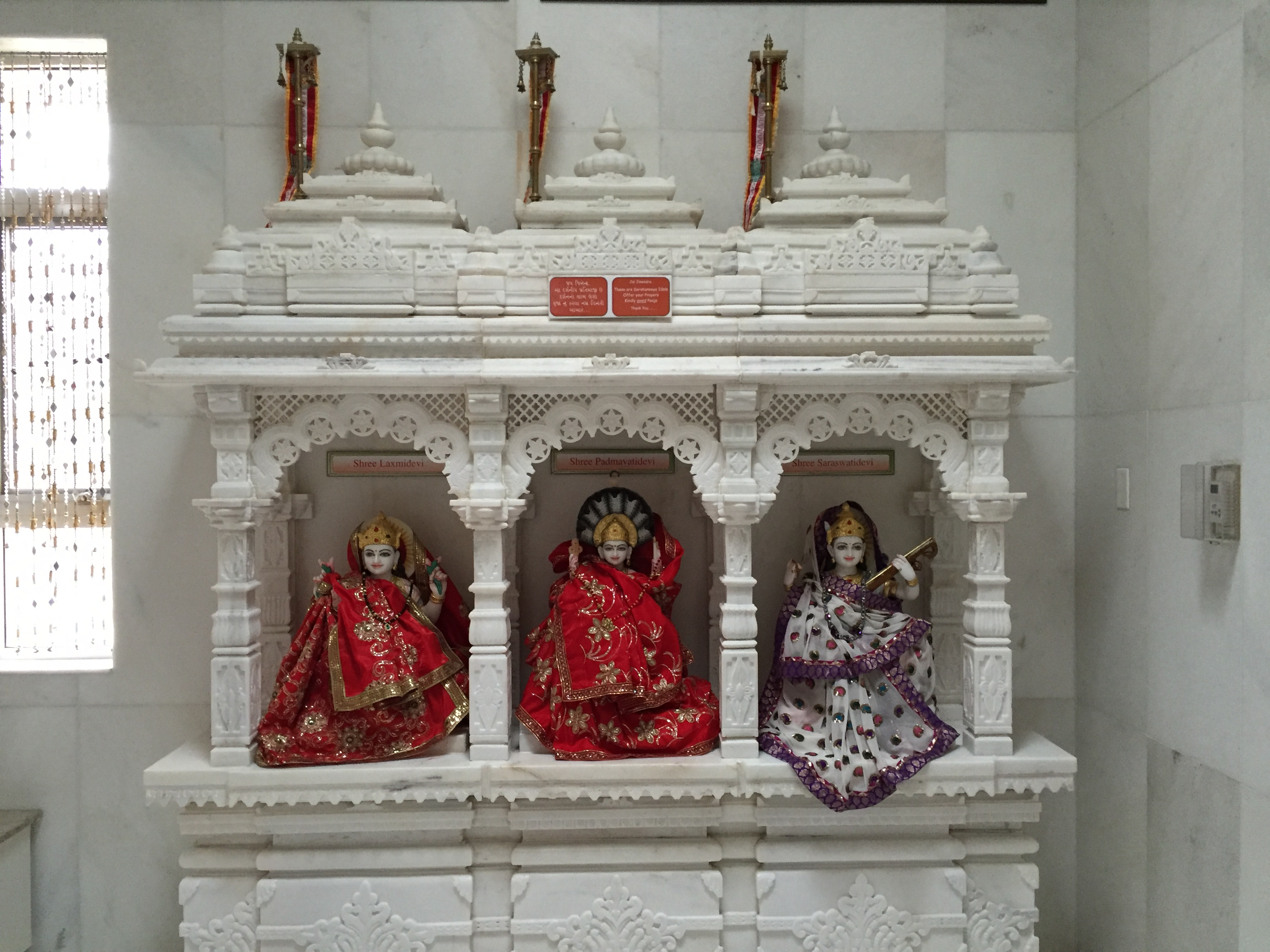
Idol of Devi at the Franklin Township Derasar

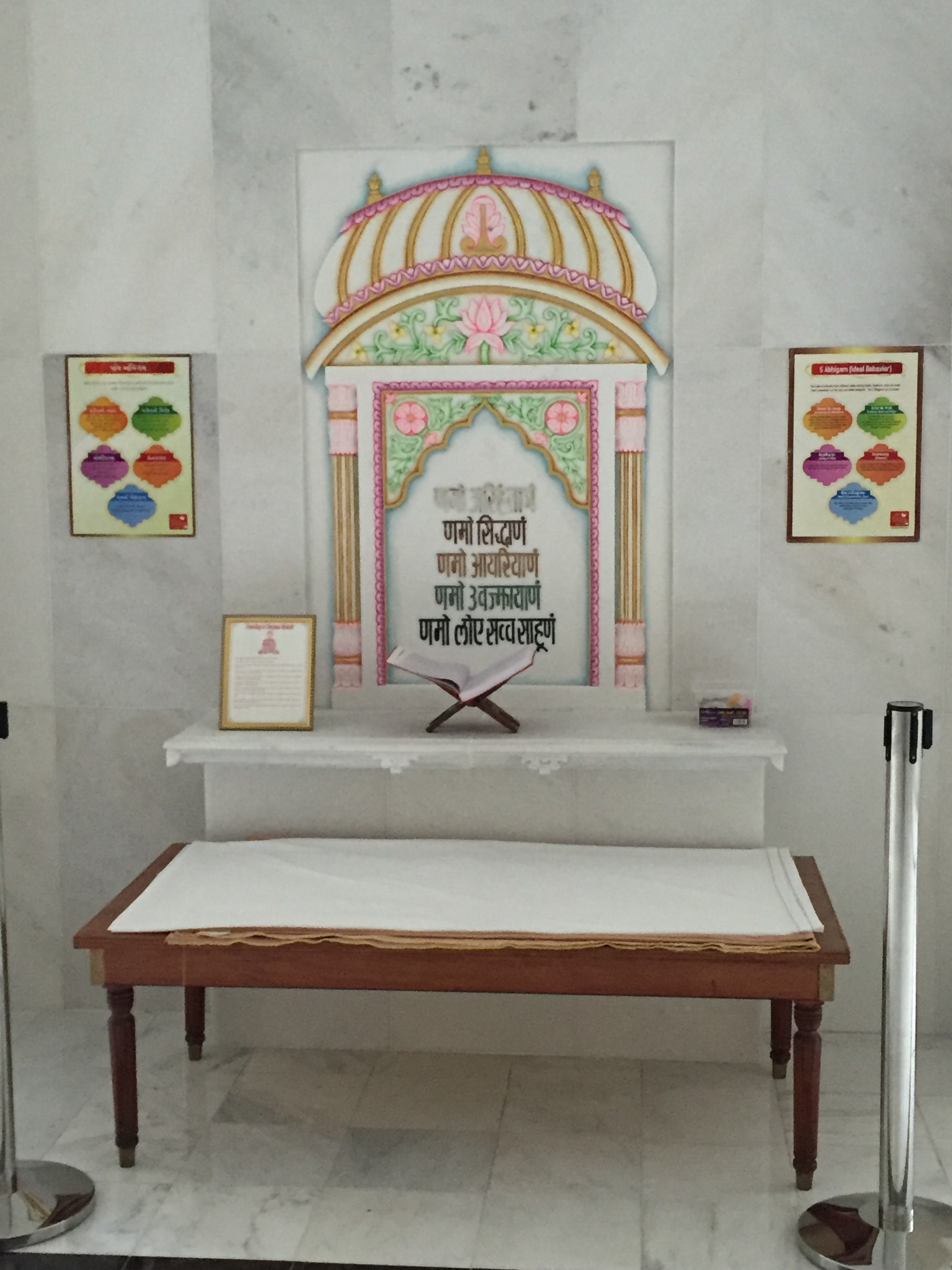
Namokar Mantra at Terapanti shrine of Franklin Township Derasar

== See also ==
- Jainism in Canada
- Jainism in Europe
- Jainism in Hong Kong
- Jainism in Singapore
- Jainism in Southeast Asia
