= Great Midwest Trivia Contest =

Annual trivia contest

The Great Midwest Trivia Contest, or Midwest Trivia Contest, is held once a year in Appleton, Wisconsin, broadcast over Twitch. It has a claim as the longest-running college bowl trivia contest. From 2006 to 2020, the contest was livestreamed by WLFM, Lawrence University's internet radio station, which ceased FM broadcasting in 2006.

== Contest ==
The contest begins at 10:00:37 p.m. on the Friday of the last full weekend in January. It ends at around midnight on Sunday for a total of approximately 50 consecutive hours. Students are appointed "trivia masters" and they administer the contest. Every year, a new lead trivia master, called the "Head Master," is appointed by the previous Head Master. The Head Master has the final say on any disputes.

About 12 Trivia masters make up the questions, and teams are given 3 minutes to answer each question, which is done via telephone and Discord. Students volunteer to answer phones during all 50 hours of the contest. All teams that answer the question receive its points. Most questions are worth 5 points each. In the early years of the contest, teams researched using massive numbers of books; now teams find answers using computers on the internet. At the end of the contest, several difficult questions called garrudas are asked. Teams are given 10 minutes for the first two garrudas. The final, most difficult question – dubbed the "Super Garruda" – is worth 100 points and teams are given 30 minutes. The endeavor is governed by the Trivia Credo: "Trivia is meant to be entertainment and should be perceived solely in that light." The teams with the highest scores are declared the winners in on-campus and off-campus categories, receiving prizes such as pink plastic flamingos and stainless-steel bedpans. The Great Midwest Trivia Contest is known as the "World's Longest Running Trivia Contest" because of its custom of having the university's president ask the previous year's Super Garruda as the first question of the next year's contest.

Questions used in the past include "What was Holden Caulfield's middle name?" and "In 2004, which nation drank the most coffee per capita?" (The answers are "Morrisey" and "Finland," respectively.) The 2009 Super Garruda was "Who was going to be married next to what was the "World's Largest Cedar Bucket" in Murfreesboro, Tennessee in June 2005, before it mysteriously burned down the week before the wedding date?" (answer: James Walters and Jaki Neubauer). In modern times, internet access has changed the way questions are written. Examples from the 2024 contest include "This primate was named after an anarchist critical of a linguist who shares a surname with the Simpsons character who said "steamed hams". What was the longest sentence the primate ever said?" and "This state house's original dome was metal-plated by the founding father who rides alongside the protagonist of Assassin's Creed III. What lies in its House of Representatives chamber, whose speaker pro tempore shares a last name with the ring name of the wrestler who had a cameo in Rocky III?" ("Give orange me give eat orange me eat orange give me eat orange give me you" and "Sacred Cod," respectively) On-campus teams are occasionally asked to do special action questions such as composing a love song or doing a dance routine based on a theme.

== History ==
The contest was founded in 1966 by James Bailey deRosset as an alternate for a serious academic retreat with professors (called "Encampment Weekend"). deRosset visited his girlfriend at Beloit College; he was disappointed with Beloit's trivia contest and had ideas on how he wanted to improve on their contest. deRosset spoke with his friend, Junior Dave Pfleger, who worked at WLFM and arranged airtime. The first contest consisted of questions in four categories (television, rock 'n' roll music, comic books, and movies) that were written by deRosset and his friends. The first question asked in 1966 was "Who was Superman's father?" (answer Jor-El). The first winners received a broken refrigerator as their prize.

It may be the oldest college-based radio trivia contest in the United States. Lawrence's inaugural edition on April 29, 1966, predates both the presumed May debut of the biannual Williams College Trivia Contest by a week or so and the February 1969 debut of the Stevens Point Media Trivia Contest by three years. However, the precise date of the first Williams contest is not known; before its playing schedule was standardized, spring semester Williams Trivia games were sometimes held as early as February and March.

Teams originally had to be within about 30 miles (48 km) to receive the FM signal for WLFM. The radio station changed to internet broadcast and the first internet-only contest was held in 2006.

The 50th annual contest was held in 2015 and it featured teams as far away as Sweden. The question difficulty had grown significantly because the teams could quickly find answers to simple questions using Google and the internet. Several Head Masters and deRosset returned for the contest. The contest had amassed over 18,000 questions in 2450 hours of competition by the end of the 2014 contest. The 50th contest featured one question per hour taken from a previous contest.

The 56th annual contest was held in 2021, and was held virtually instead of on WLFM radio as a response to the COVID-19 pandemic. The contest was streamed via Twitch. Contestants submitted results via a Discord phone answering system as well as a Google form instead of solely via telephone. This method continued to be used for the 57th contest.

The 58th annual contest was held in 2023 and saw the erection of the "Trivia Flag" on the cupola of Lawrence University's Main Hall, an ode to the year's theme: pirates.

== References in popular media ==
The Lawrence trivia contest has been written about in Playboy, USA Today, The Chronicle of Higher Education, the Chicago Tribune, Washington Post, The New York Times, and most of the newspapers in Wisconsin. The 1984 Head Trivia Master, John Landis, '84, appeared on ABC's "Good Morning America." Paul Harvey asked a question in the 1978 contest: "I’m Paul Harvey. Now, for five trivia points where is the International Armadillo Confab and Exposition held? Gooooood Day!" The answer was Victoria, Texas.
