= WLFM (disambiguation) =

WLFM is a radio station (102.5 FM) licensed to Lawrenceburg, Tennessee

WLFM may refer to:

- WTCL-LD, a television station (channel 20) licensed to Cleveland, Ohio, which held the call sign WLFM-LP from 2012 to 2021
- WRME-LD, a television station (channel 33) operating as a radio station (87.75 FM) license to Chicago, Illinois, which held the call sign WLFM-LP from 2006 to 2012
- WOVM, a radio station (91.1 FM) licensed to Appleton, Wisconsin, which held the call sign WLFM from 1995 to 2005
