= Louisiana Purchase Exposition =

1904 world's fair in St. Louis, Missouri, US

1904 St. Louis
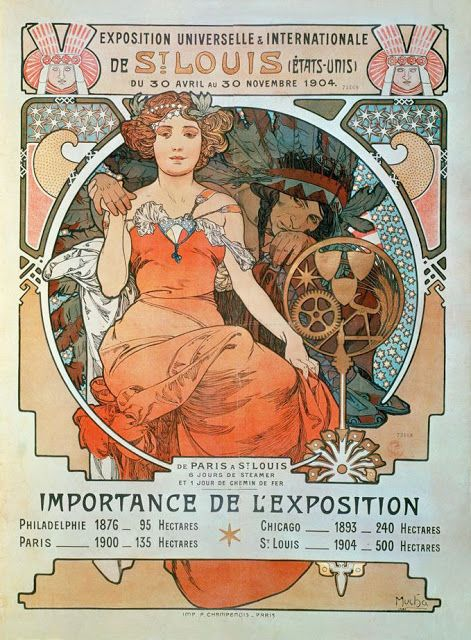
- Poster for the exposition painted by Alphonse Mucha

Overview
- BIE-class: Universal exposition
- Category: Historical Expo
- Name: Louisiana Purchase Exposition
- Area: 1,270 acres (510 hectares)
- Visitors: 19,694,855

Participant(s)
- Countries: 62

Location
- Country: United States
- City: St. Louis
- Venue: Forest Park, Washington University in St. Louis
- Coordinates: 38°38′18.6″N 90°17′9.2″W

Timeline
- Opening: April 30, 1904
- Closure: December 1, 1904

Universal expositions
- Previous: Exposition Universelle (1900) in Paris
- Next: Liège International (1905) in Liège

The Louisiana Purchase Exposition, informally known as the St. Louis World's Fair, was an international exposition held in St. Louis, Missouri, United States, from April 30 to December 1, 1904. Local, state, and federal funds totaling $15 million (equivalent to $538 million in 2025) were used to finance the event. More than 60 countries and 43 of the then-45 American states maintained exhibition spaces at the fair, which was attended by nearly 19.7 million people.

Historians generally emphasize the prominence of the themes of race and imperialism, and the fair's long-lasting impact on intellectuals in the fields of history, architecture, and anthropology. From the point of view of the memory of the average person who attended the fair, it primarily promoted entertainment, consumer goods, and popular culture. The monumental Greco-Roman architecture of this and other fairs of the era did much to influence permanent new buildings and master plans of major cities.

== Background ==
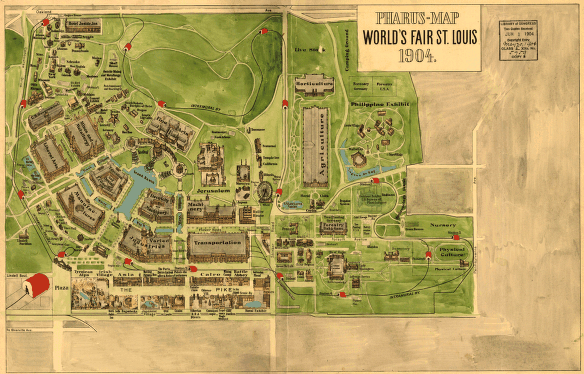
St. Louis World's Fair map

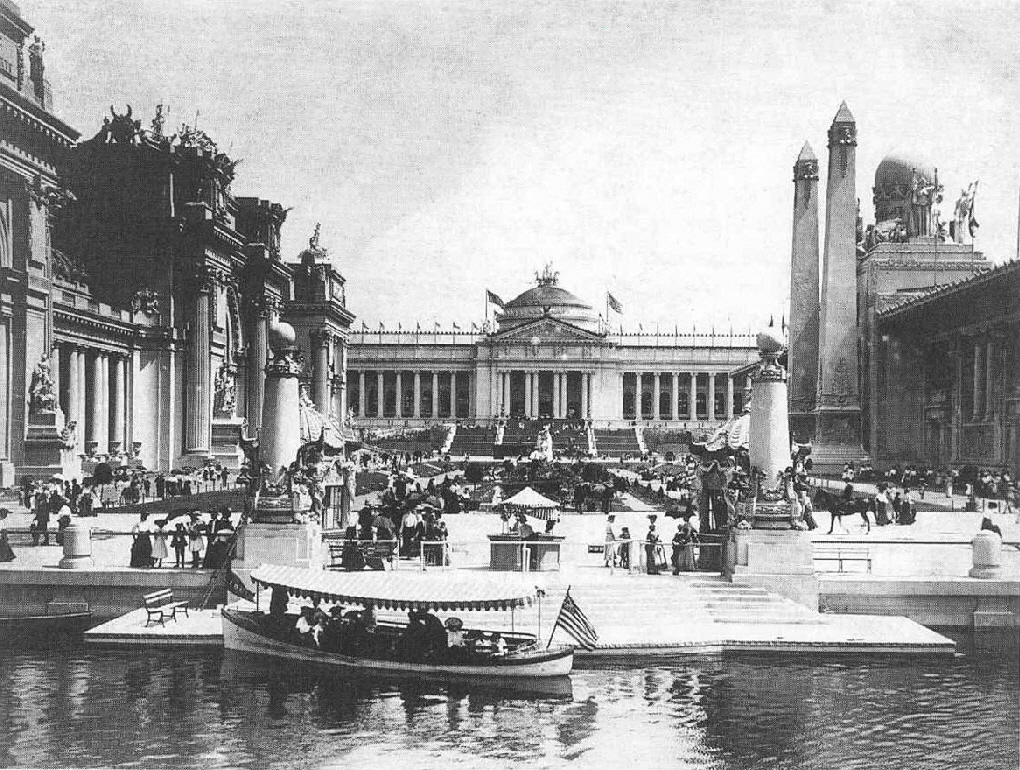
The Government Building at the Louisiana Purchase Exposition

In 1904, St. Louis hosted a world's fair to celebrate the centennial of the 1803 Louisiana Purchase. The idea for such a commemorative event seems to have emerged early in 1898, with Kansas City and St. Louis initially presented as potential hosts for a fair based on their central location within the territory encompassed by the 1803 land annexation.

The exhibition was grand in scale and lengthy in preparation, with an initial $5 million committed by the city of St. Louis through the sale of city bonds, authorized by the Missouri state legislature in April 1899. An additional $5 million was generated through private donations by interested citizens and businesses from around Missouri, a fundraising target reached in January 1901. The final installment of $5 million of the exposition's $15 million capitalization came in the form of earmarked funds that were part of a congressional appropriations bill passed at the end of May 1900. The fundraising mission was aided by the active support of President of the United States William McKinley, which was won by organizers in a February 1899 White House visit.

While initially conceived as a centennial celebration to be held in 1903, the actual opening of the St. Louis exposition was delayed until April 30, 1904, to allow for full-scale participation by more states and foreign countries. The exposition operated until December 1, 1904. During the year of the fair, the Louisiana Purchase Exposition supplanted the annual St. Louis Exposition of agricultural, trade, and scientific exhibitions which had been held in the city since the 1880s.

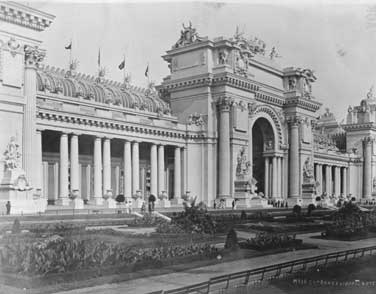
Palace of Liberal Arts

The fair's 1,200-acre (4.9 km^{2}; 1.9 mi^{2}) site, designed by George Kessler, was located at the present-day grounds of Forest Park and on the campus of Washington University, and was the largest fair (in area) to date. There were over 1,500 buildings, connected by some 75 miles (121 km) of roads and walkways. It was said to be impossible to give even a hurried glance at everything in less than a week. The Palace of Agriculture alone covered some 20 acres (81,000 m^{2}).

Exhibits were staged by approximately 50 foreign nations, the United States government, and 43 of the then-45 US states. These featured industries, cities, private organizations and corporations, theater troupes, and music schools. There were also over 50 concession-type amusements found on "The Pike"; they provided educational and scientific displays, exhibits and imaginary 'travel' to distant lands, history and local boosterism (including Louis Wollbrinck's "Old St. Louis") and pure entertainment.

Over 19 million individuals were in attendance at the fair.

Aspects that attracted visitors included the buildings and architecture, new foods, popular music, and exotic people on display. American culture was showcased at the fair especially regarding innovations in communication, medicine, and transportation.

== Architects ==
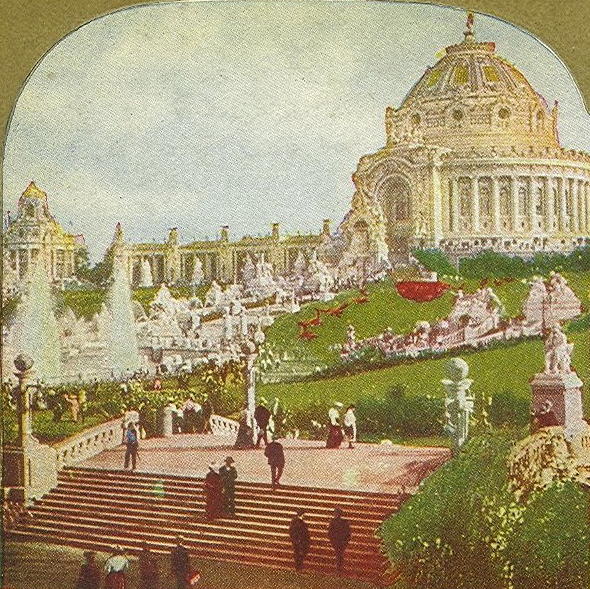
Festival Hall

George Kessler, who designed many urban parks in Texas and the Midwest, created the master design for the Fair.

A popular myth says that Frederick Law Olmsted, who had died the year before the Fair, designed the park and fair grounds. There are several reasons for this confusion. First, Kessler in his twenties had worked briefly for Olmsted as a Central Park gardener. Second, Olmsted was involved with Forest Park in Queens, New York. Third, Olmsted had planned the renovations in 1897 to the Missouri Botanical Garden several blocks to the southeast of the park. Finally, Olmsted's sons advised Washington University on integrating the campus with the park across the street.

In 1901, the Louisiana Purchase Exposition Corporation selected prominent St. Louis architect Isaac S. Taylor as the Chairman of the Architectural Commission and Director of Works for the fair, supervising the overall design and construction. Taylor quickly appointed Emmanuel Louis Masqueray to be his Chief of Design. In the position for three years, Masqueray designed the following Fair buildings: Palace of Agriculture, the Cascades and Colonnades, Palace of Forestry, Fish, and Game, Palace of Horticulture and Palace of Transportation, all of which were widely emulated in civic projects across the United States as part of the City Beautiful movement. Masqueray resigned shortly after the Fair opened in 1904, having been invited by Archbishop John Ireland of St. Paul, Minnesota, to design a new cathedral for the city. The Palace of Electricity was designed by Messrs, Walker & Kimball, of Omaha, Nebraska. It covered 9 acres (3.6 ha) and cost over $400,000 (equivalent to more than $14.3 million in 2025). Crowning the great towers were heroic groups of statuary typifying the various attributes of electricity.

== Board of Commissioners ==
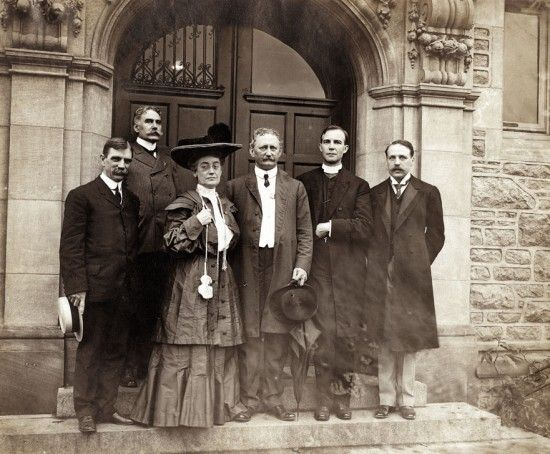
St. Louis mayor Rolla Wells, Frank D. Hershberg, Florence Hayward, Fair president David R. Francis, Archbishop John J. Glennon, and Vatican commissioner Signor Coquitti (l to r) at the opening of the Vatican Exhibit at the 1904 World's Fair. Photograph attributed to Jessie Tarbox Beals, 1904. Missouri History Museum.

Florence Hayward, a successful freelance writer in St. Louis in the 1900s, was determined to play a role in the World's Fair. She negotiated a position on the otherwise all-male Board of Commissioners. Hayward learned that one of the potential contractors for the fair was not reputable and warned the Louisiana Purchase Exposition Company (LPEC). In exchange for this information, she requested an appointment as roving commissioner to Europe.

Former mayor of St. Louis and governor of Missouri David R. Francis, LPEC president, made the appointment and allowed Hayward to travel overseas to promote the fair, especially to women. The fair also had a Board of Lady Managers (BLM) who felt they had jurisdiction over women's activities at the fair and objected to Hayward's appointment without their knowledge. Despite this, Hayward set out for England in 1902. Hayward's most notable contribution to the fair was acquiring gifts Queen Victoria received for her Golden Jubilee and other historical items, including manuscripts from the Vatican. These items were all to be shown in exhibits at the fair.

Pleased with her success in Europe, Francis put her in charge of historical exhibits in the anthropology division, which had originally been assigned to Pierre Chouteau III. Despite being the only woman on the Board of Commissioners, creating successful anthropological exhibits, publicizing the fair, and acquiring significant exhibit items, Hayward's role in the fair was not acknowledged. When Francis published a history of the fair in 1913, he did not mention Hayward's contributions and she never forgave the slight.

== Scientific contributions ==
Expositions are the timekeepers of progress. They record the world's advancement. They stimulate the energy, enterprise, and intellect of the people; and quicken human genius. They go into the home. They broaden and brighten the daily life of the people. They open mighty storehouses of information to the student.

— President William McKinley at the 1901 World's Fair

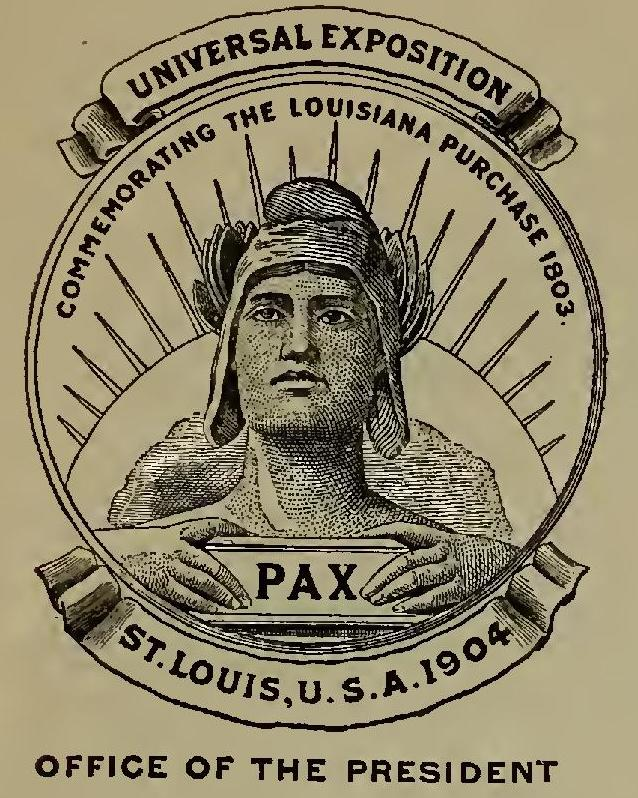
"Office of the President" 1904 official letterhead art

Many of the inventions displayed were precursors to items which have become an integral part of today's culture. Novel applications of electricity and light waves for communication and medical use were displayed in the Palace of Electricity. According to an article he wrote for Harper's Weekly, W. E. Goldsborough, the Chief of the Department of Electricity for the Fair, wished to educate the public and dispel the misconceptions about electricity which many common people believed. New and updated methods of transportation also showcased at the World's Fair in the Palace of Transportation would come to revolutionize transportation for the modern day.

=== Communication contributions ===
Wireless telephone – The "wireless telephony" unit or "radiophone" was invented by Alexander Graham Bell and installed at the St. Louis World Fair. This radiophone comprised a sound-light transmitter and a light-sound receiver, as an apparatus in the Palace of Electricity transmitted music or speech to a receiver in the courtyard. Visitors heard the transmission when holding the cordless receiver to the ear. It developed into the radio and telephone.

Early fax machine – The telautograph was invented in 1888 by American scientist Elisha Gray, who contested Alexander Graham Bell's invention of the telephone. A person wrote on one end of the telautograph, which electrically communicated with the receiving pen to recreate drawings on paper. In 1900, assistant Foster Ritchie improved the device to display at the 1904 World's Fair and market for the next thirty years. This developed into the fax machine.

=== Medical contributions ===
Finsen light – The Finsen light, invented by Niels Ryberg Finsen, treated tuberculosis luposa. Finsen received the Nobel Prize in Medicine and Physiology in 1903. This pioneered phototherapy.

X-ray machine – The X-ray machine was launched at the 1904 World's Fair. German scientist Wilhelm Conrad Röntgen discovered X-rays studying electrification of low pressure gas. He X-rayed his wife's hand, capturing her bones and wedding ring to show colleagues. Thomas Edison and assistant Clarence Dally recreated the machine. Dally failed to test another X-ray machine at the 1901 World's Fair after President McKinley was assassinated. A perfected X-ray machine was successfully exhibited at the 1904 World's Fair. X-rays are now commonplace in hospitals and airports.

Infant incubator – Although infant incubators were invented in the year 1888 by Drs. Alan M. Thomas and William Champion, adoption was not immediate. To advertise the benefits, incubators containing preterm babies were displayed at the 1897, 1898, 1901, and 1904 World Fairs. These provided immunocompromised newborns a sanitary environment. Each incubator comprised an airtight glass box with a metal frame. Hot forced air thermoregulated the container. Newspapers advertised the incubators with "lives are being preserved by this wonderful method." During the 1904 World Fair, E. M. Bayliss exhibited these devices on The Pike where approximately ten nurses cared for twenty-four neonates. The entrance fee was 25 cents (equivalent to $8.96 in 2025) while the adjoining shop and café offered souvenirs and refreshments. Proceeds totaling $181,632 (equivalent to $6.51 million in 2025) helped fund Bayliss's project. Inconsistent sanitation killed some babies, so glass walls were installed between them and visitors, shielding the infants. These developed into "isolettes" in modern neonatal intensive care units.

=== Transportation contributions ===
Electric streetcar – North American street railways from the early 19th century were being introduced to electric street railcars. An electric streetcar on a 1,400 feet (430 m) track demonstrated its speed, acceleration, and braking outside the Palace of Electricity. Many downtown trams today are electric.

Personal automobile – The Palace of Transportation displayed automobiles and motor cars. The private automobile was revealed here. The automobile display contained 140 models including ones powered by gasoline, steam, and electricity. Inventor Lee de Forest demonstrated a prototype car radio. Four years later, the Ford Motor Company began producing the affordable Ford Model T.

Airplane – The 1904 World's Fair hosted the first "Airship Contest". Stationary air balloons demarcated a time trial with a minimum speed limit of 15 miles per hour (24 km/h). Nobody won the $100,000 grand prize (equivalent to $3.58 million in 2025). The contest witnessed the first public dirigible flight in America. A history of aviation in St. Louis followed, leading to the nickname Flight City.

== Legacy ==
St. Louis' status as an up-and-coming city garnered interest from many reporters and photographers who attended the World's Fair and found its citizens constantly on the "go" and the streets "crowded with activity". One observer remarked that, at this time, St. Louis had more energy in its streets than any other northern city did.

=== Buildings ===
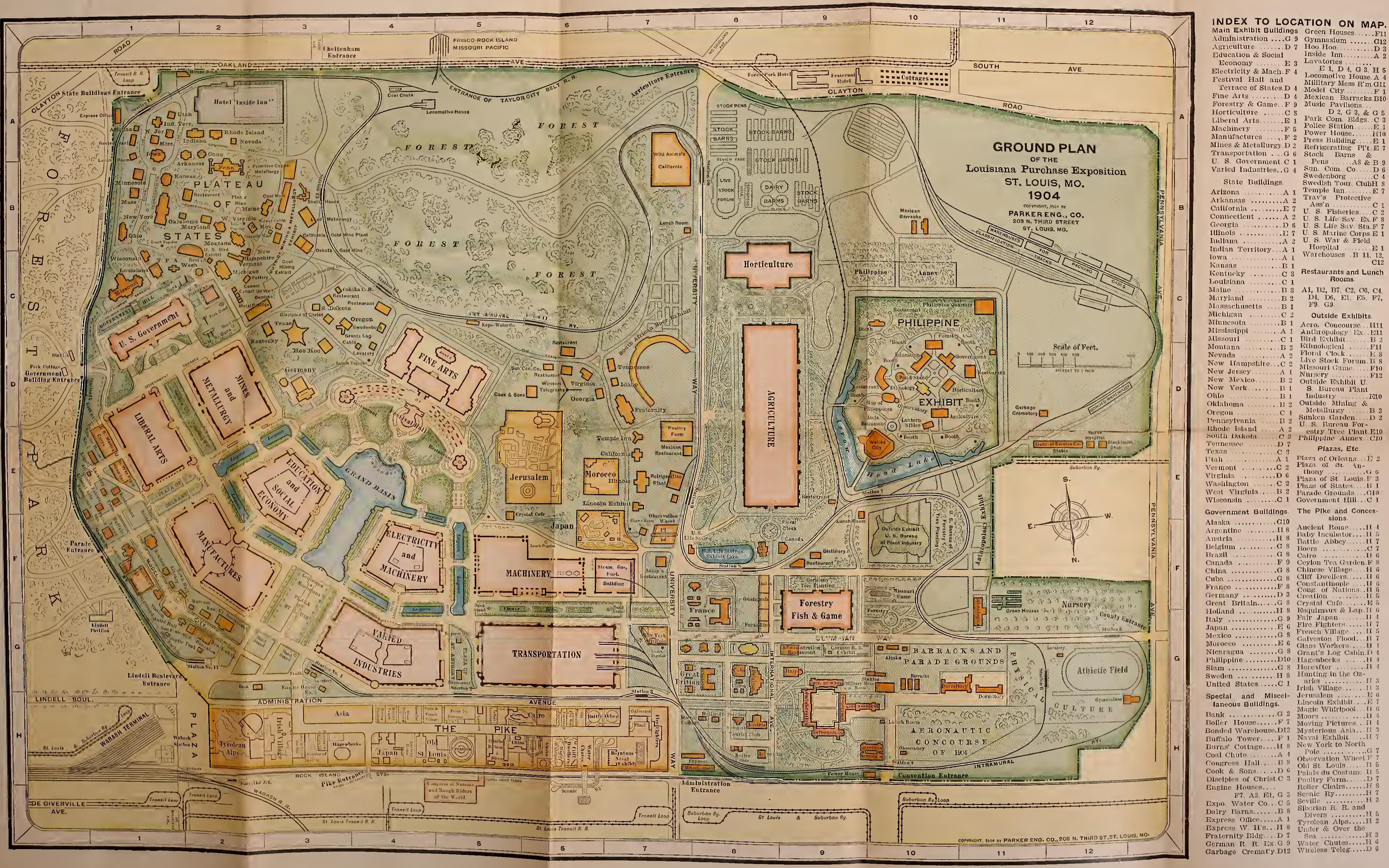
Map or "Ground Plan" in 1904

With more and more people interested in the city, St. Louis government and architects were primarily concerned with their ports and access to the city. The city originating as a trading post, transportation by water was important. It was becoming even more important that the port be open, but efficient for all visitors. It also needed to show off some of the city's flair and excitement, which is why in many photographs one sees photos of St. Louis' skyscrapers in the background. In addition to a functioning port, the Eads Bridge was constructed, which was considered one of St. Louis' "sights". At 1,627 feet (496 m) long, it connected Missouri and Illinois, and was the first large-scale application of steel as a structural material.

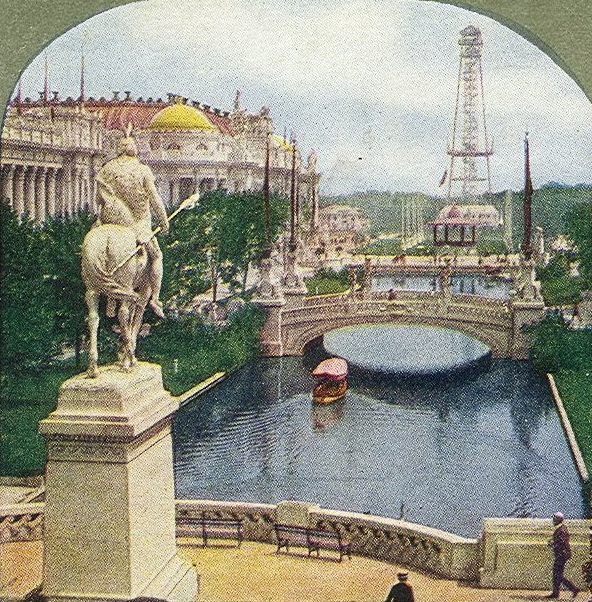
East Lagoon, statue of Saint Louis, Palaces of Education and Manufacture, and wireless telegraph tower.

As with the World's Columbian Exposition in Chicago in 1893, all but one of the Louisiana Purchase Exposition's grand, neo-Classical exhibition palaces were temporary structures, designed to last but a year or two. They were built with a material called "staff", a mixture of plaster of Paris and hemp fibers, on a wood frame. As at the Chicago World's Fair, buildings and statues deteriorated during the months of the Fair and had to be patched.

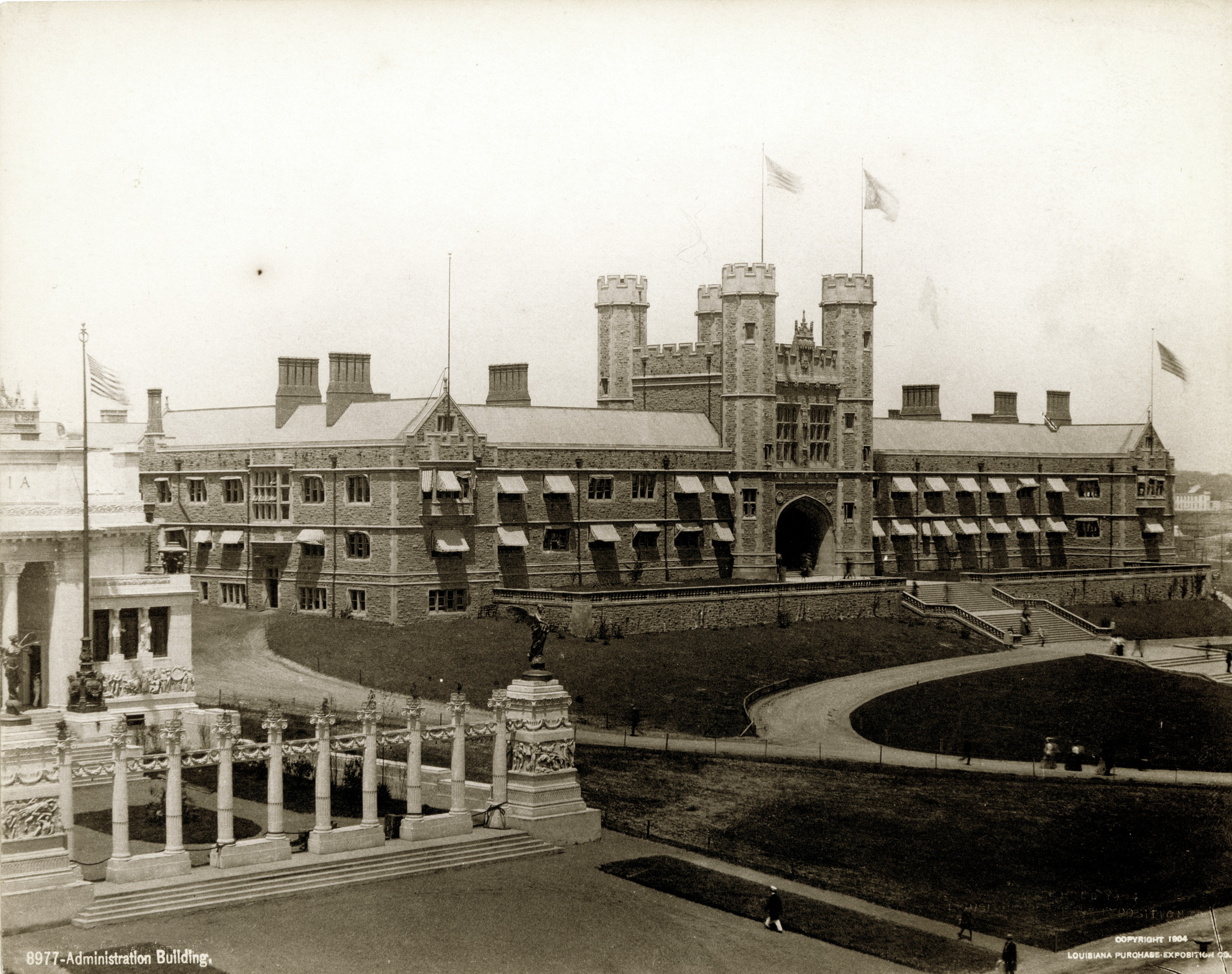
Brookings Hall (1902) Washington University in St. Louis

The Administration Building, designed by Cope & Stewardson, is now Brookings Hall, the defining landmark on the campus of Washington University. A similar building was erected at Northwest Missouri State University founded in 1905 in Maryville, Missouri. The grounds' layout was also recreated in Maryville and now is designated as the official Missouri State Arboretum.

The Palace of Fine Art, designed by architect Cass Gilbert, featured a grand interior sculpture court based on the Roman Baths of Caracalla. Standing at the top of Art Hill, it now serves as the home of the St. Louis Art Museum.

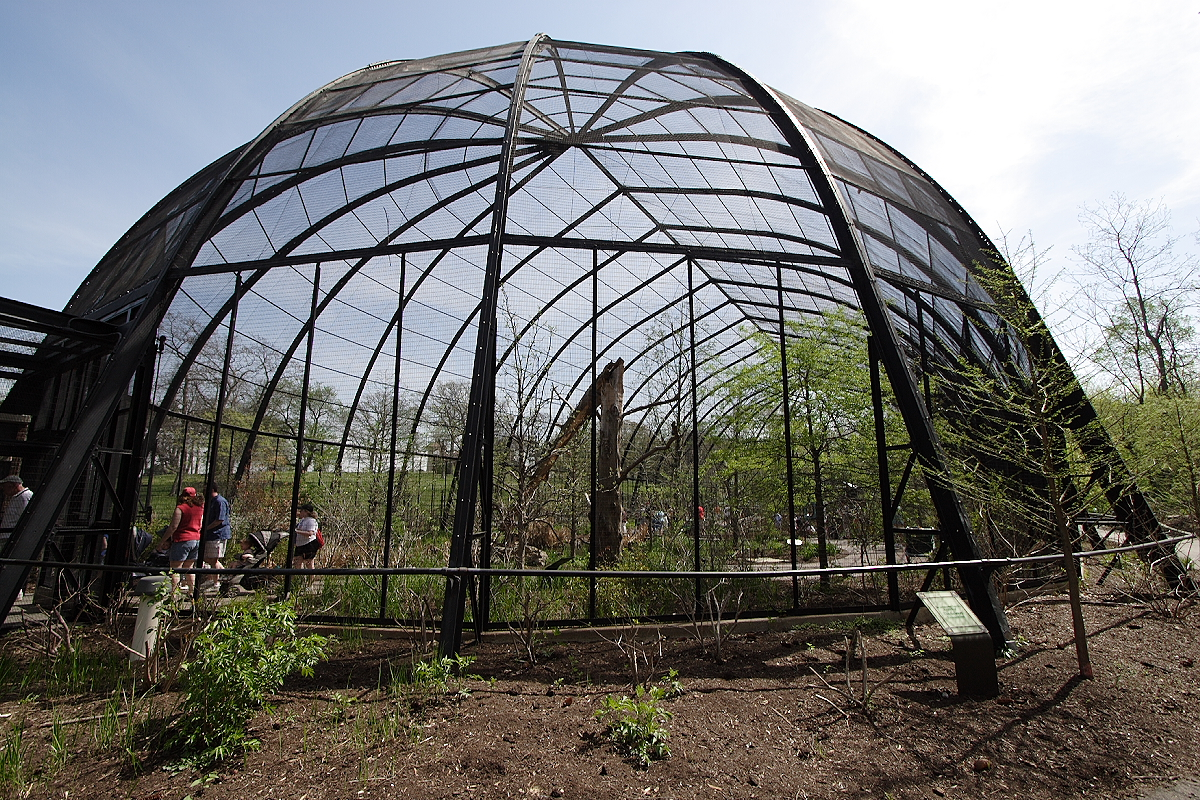
Flight Cage (Aviary)

The huge bird cage at the Saint Louis Zoological Park, dates to the fair. A Jain temple carved out of teak stood within the Indian Pavilion near the Ferris Wheel. It was dismantled after the exhibition and was reconstructed in Las Vegas at the Castaways hotel. It has recently been reassembled and is now on display at the Jain Center of Southern California at Los Angeles. Birmingham, Alabama's iconic cast iron Vulcan statue was first exhibited at the Fair in the Palace of Mines and Metallurgy. Additionally, a plaster reproduction of Alma Mater at Columbia University by Daniel Chester French was displayed at the Grand Sculpture Court of the exhibition.

The Missouri State building was the largest of the state buildings, as Missouri was the host state. Though it had sections with marble floors and heating and air conditioning, it was planned to be a temporary structure. However, it burned the night of November 18–19, just eleven days before the Fair was to end. Most interior contents were destroyed, but furniture and much of the Model Library were undamaged. The fair being almost over, the building was not rebuilt. In 1909–10, the current World's Fair Pavilion in Forest Park was built on the site of the Missouri building with profits from the fair.

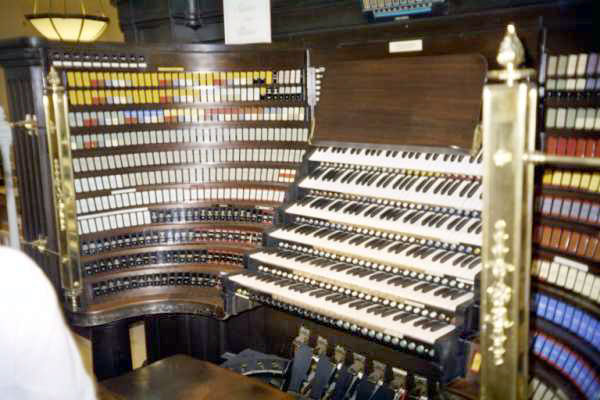
The organ's present six–manual console, installed in 1928.

Festival Hall, designed by Cass Gilbert and used for large-scale musical pageants, contained the largest organ in the world at the time, built by the Los Angeles Art Organ Company (which went bankrupt as a result). The great organ was debuted by the fair's official organist, Charles Henry Galloway. Though the opening concert was scheduled for the first day of the fair, complications related to its construction resulted in the opening concert being postponed until June 9. After the fair, the organ was placed into storage, and eventually purchased by John Wanamaker for his new Wanamaker's store in Philadelphia where it was tripled in size and became known as the Wanamaker Organ. The famous Bronze Eagle in the Wanamaker Store also came from the Fair. It features hundreds of hand-forged bronze feathers and was the centerpiece of one of the many German exhibits. Wanamaker's became a Lord & Taylor store and more recently, a Macy's store.

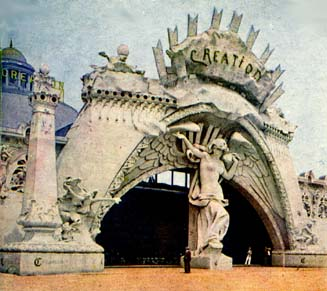
Entrance to the exhibit "Creation" on the Pike, a spectacle portraying the first six days in the Book of Genesis. This exhibit was dismantled and moved to Coney Island's Dreamland amusement park at the end of the fair.

Completed in 1913, the Jefferson Memorial building was built near the main entrance to the Exposition, at Lindell and DeBalivere. It was built with proceeds from the fair, to commemorate Thomas Jefferson, who initiated the Louisiana Purchase, as was the first memorial to the third President. It became the headquarters of the Missouri History Museum, and stored the Exposition's records and archives when the Louisiana Purchase Exposition company completed its mission. The building is now home to the Missouri History Museum, and the museum was significantly expanded in 2002–3.

The State of Maine Building, which was a rustic cabin, was transported to Point Lookout, Missouri where it overlooked the White River by sportsmen who formed the Maine Hunting and Fishing Club. In 1915, when the main building at the College of the Ozarks in Forsyth, Missouri burned, the school relocated to Point Lookout, where the Maine building was renamed the Dobyns Building in honor of a school president. The Dobyns Building burned in 1930 and the college's signature church was built in its place. In 2004, a replica of the Maine building was built on the campus. The Keeter Center is named for another school president.

The observation tower erected by the American DeForest Wireless Telegraph Company was brought to the Fair when it became a hazard near Niagara Falls and needed to be removed because in the wintertime, ice from the fall's mist would form on the steel structure, and eventually fall onto the buildings below. It served as a communications platform for Lee DeForest's work in wireless telegraphy and a platform to view the fair. As Niagara Falls was near Buffalo New York, it was also called the Buffalo Tower After the World's Fair, it was moved to Creve Coeur Lake to be part of that park.

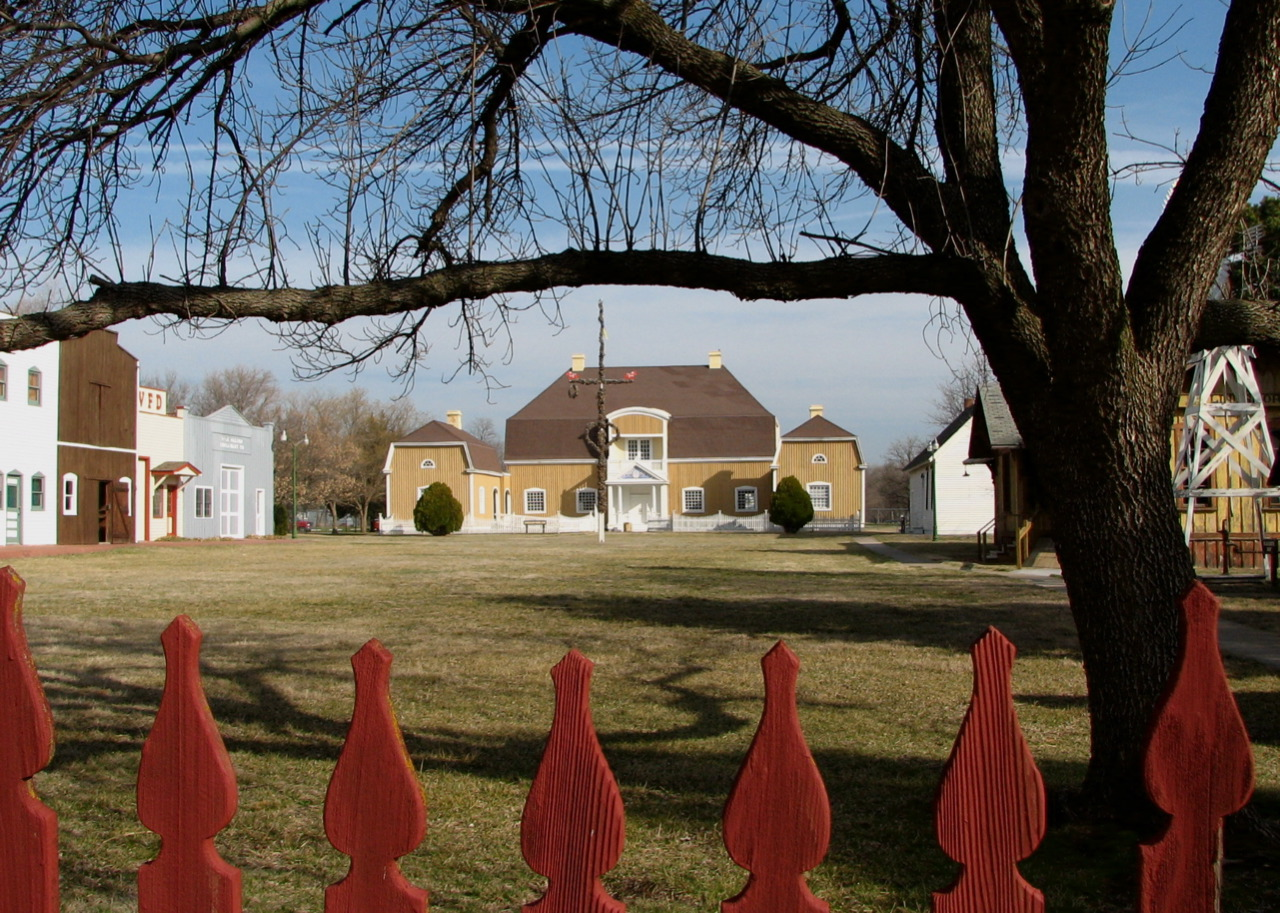
The 1904 World's Fair Swedish Pavilion is located in Lindsborg, Kansas at the Lindsborg Old Mill & Swedish Heritage Museum.

The Swedish Pavilion is still preserved in Lindsborg, Kansas. Designed by Swedish architect Ferdinand Boberg, it is the only one of his international exposition buildings in existence today. After the fair, the Pavilion was moved to Bethany College in Lindsborg, where it was used for classroom, library, museum and department facilities for the art department. In 1969, it was moved to the Lindsborg Old Mill & Swedish Heritage Museum where it serves as a venue for community events. The Pavilion was added to the National Historic Register in 1973.

Westinghouse Electric sponsored the Westinghouse Auditorium, where they showed films of Westinghouse factories and products.

Some mansions from the Exposition's era survive along Lindell Boulevard at the north border of Forest Park.

=== Introduction of new foods ===
A number of foods are claimed to have been invented at the fair. The most popular claim is that of the waffle-style ice cream cone. However, its popularization, not invention, is widely believed to have taken place here. Dubious claims include the hamburger and hot dog (both traditional American and European foods of German origin), peanut butter, iced tea, and cotton candy. Again, popularization is more likely. Dr Pepper and Puffed Wheat cereal were introduced to a national audience. Freeborn Annie Fisher received a gold medal for her beaten biscuits famous in her hometown of Columbia, Missouri. President William Howard Taft enjoyed them on his 1911 visit to Missouri.

Though not the debut of as many foods as claimed, the fair offered what was essentially America's first food court. Visitors sampled a variety of fast foods, dined in dozens of restaurants, and strolled through the mile-long pike. As one historian said of the fair, "one could breakfast in France, take a mid-morning snack in the Philippines, lunch in Italy, and dine in Japan."

=== Influence on popular music and literature ===
The fair inspired the song "Meet Me in St. Louis, Louis", which was recorded by many artists, including Billy Murray. Both the fair and the song are focal points of the 1944 feature film Meet Me in St. Louis starring Judy Garland, which also inspired a Broadway musical version. Scott Joplin wrote the rag "Cascades" in honor of the elaborate waterfalls in front of Festival Hall.

A book entitled Wild Song, by Candy Gourlay, was inspired by the Louisiana Purchase.

=== People on display ===
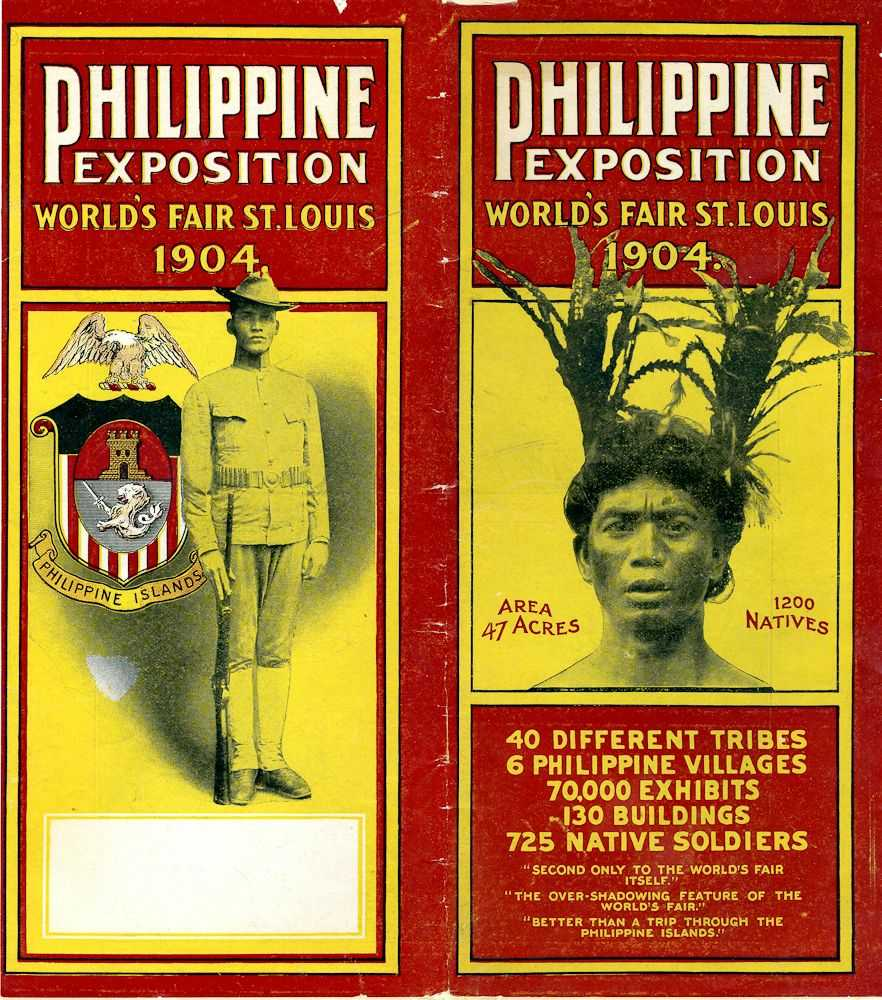
Advertisement for human exhibits from the Philippine Islands at the World's Fair, St. Louis, 1904

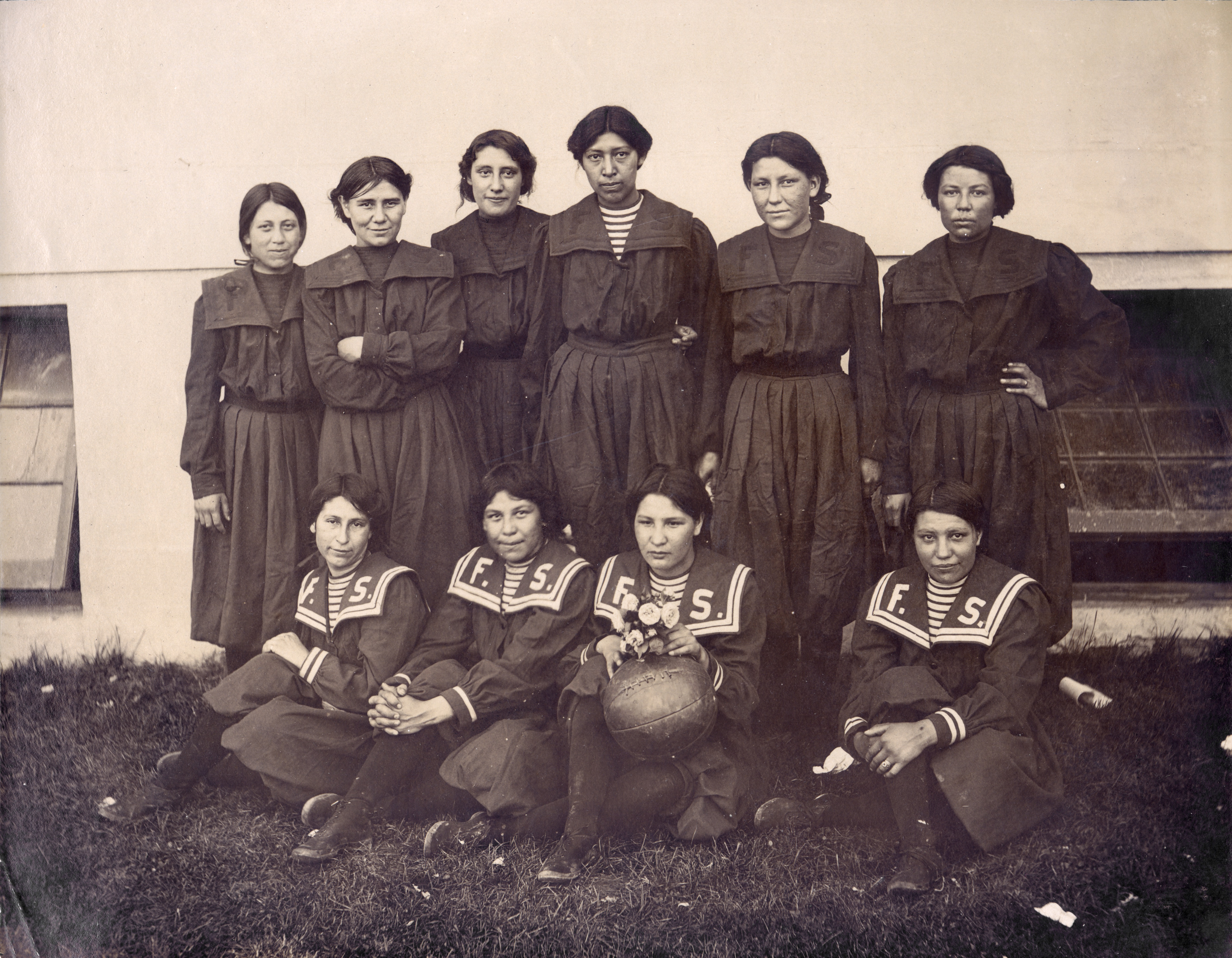
"Indian girls dressed for a ball game, U.S. Government Indian exhibit."

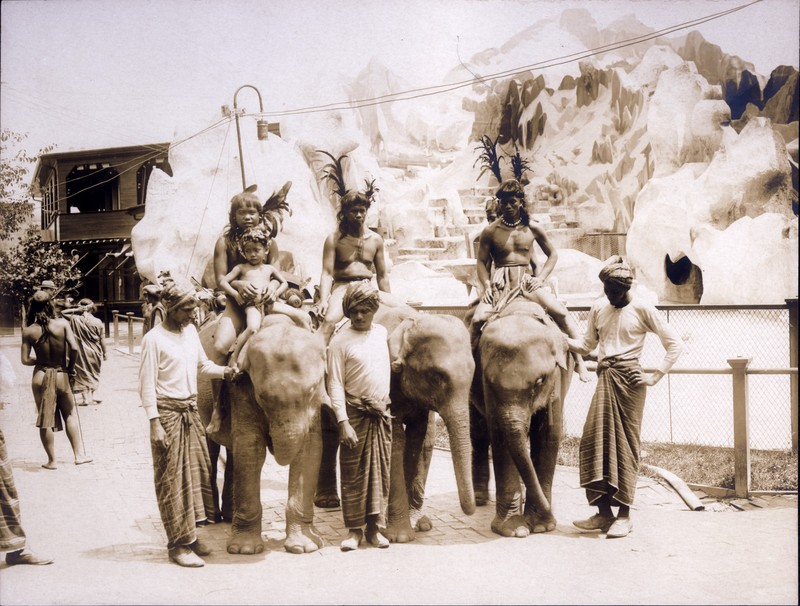
Image of the Igorot attraction at the 1904 World's Fair

Several groups of indigenous peoples from around the world were displayed at the exposition, including Filipino, Tlingit, Patagonian, and Ainu people, as well as Ota Benga, an Mbuti man.

Following the Spanish–American War, the peace treaty granted the United States control over Guam, the Philippines, and Puerto Rico. Puerto Rico had had a quasi-autonomous government as an "overseas province" of Spain, and the Philippines, having declared independence after the 1896–1899 Philippine Revolution, fought US annexation in the 1899–1902 Philippine–American War. These areas controversially became unincorporated territories of the United States in 1899, and people were brought from these territories to be on "display" at the 1904 fair.

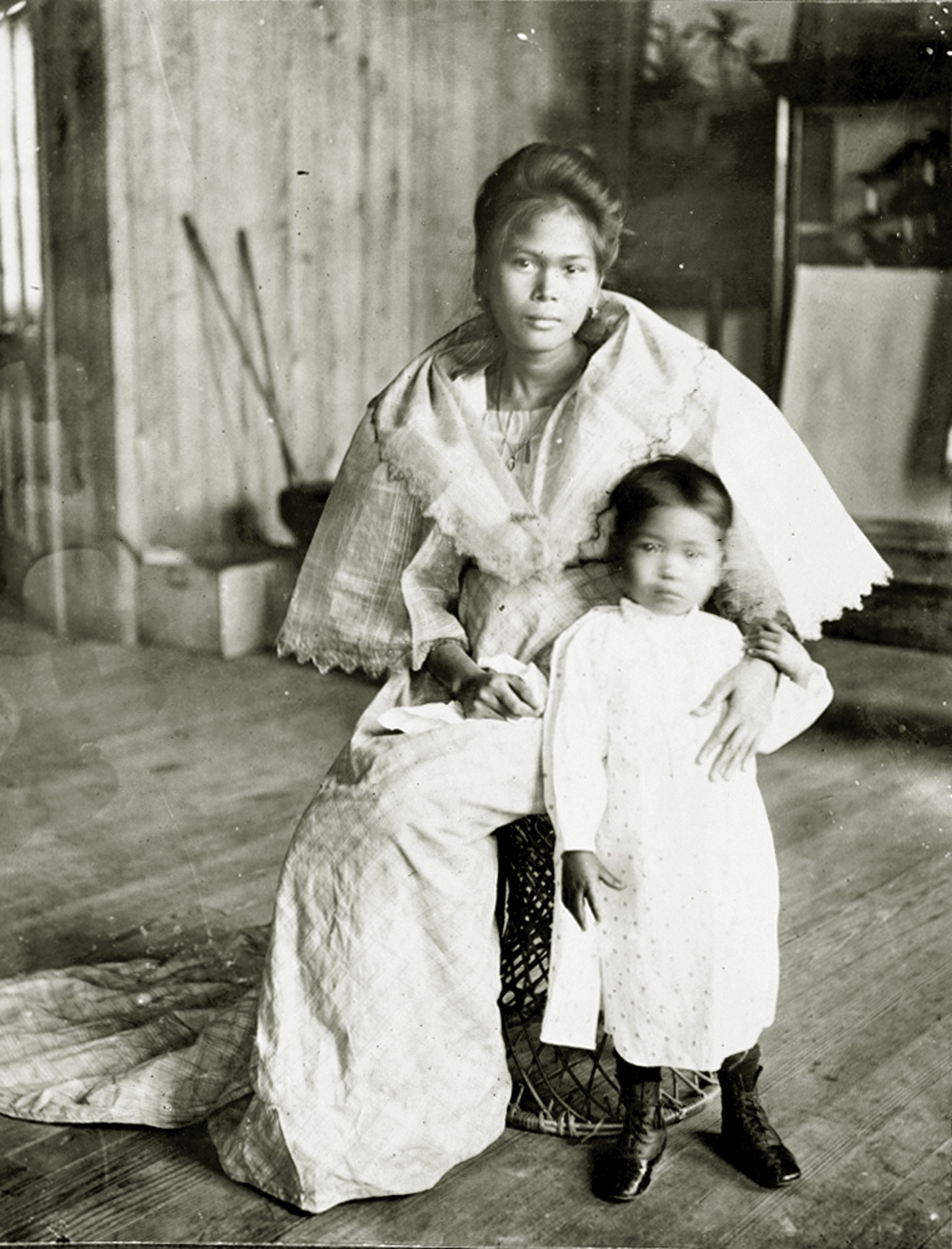
"A Civilized Visayan." (Philippine Reservation in the Department of Anthropology exhibit at the 1904 World's Fair), 1904.

The fair displayed 1,102 Filipinos, 700 of them Philippine Scouts and Philippine Constabulary, used for controlling conflict among Filipinos and between Filipinos and fair organizers. Displays included the Apache of the American Southwest and the Igorots of the Philippines, both of which peoples were noted as "primitive". Within the Philippine reservation, was a school which was actively teaching Igorot students. At least two Moros were photographed while praying at the fair. The Philippine reservation at the exposition cost $1.1 million (equivalent to $39.4 million in 2025) to create and operate. The people had been trafficked under harsh conditions, and many did not survive. Burial plots in two St. Louis cemeteries were prepared in advance. However, traditional burial practices were not allowed. Some of the people to be exhibited died en route or at the fair and their bodies were immediately removed. Funeral rites had to be conducted without the bodies in front of an oblivious public audience of fair attendees. Organizers choreographed ethnographic displays, having customs which marked special occasions restaged day after day.

Similarly, members of the Southeast Alaskan Tlingit tribe accompanied fourteen totem poles, two Native houses, and a canoe displayed at the Alaska Exhibit. Mary Knight Benson, a noted Pomo basket weaver whose work is curated at the Smithsonian Institution and National Museum of the American Indian, attended to demonstrate her basket making skills which are described as astounding. Athletic events such as a basketball tournament were held to demonstrate the success of the Indian Boarding Schools and other assimilation programs. These efforts were confirmed with the Fort Shaw Indian School girls basketball team who were declared "World Champions" after beating every team who faced them in these denominational games. Indigenous people from Patagonia were also displayed in the anthropology area.

It has been argued that the "overriding purpose of the fair really centered on an effort to promote America's new role as an overseas imperial power", and that "While the juxtaposition of "modern" and "primitive" buttressed assumptions of racial superiority, representations of Native American and Filipino life created an impression of continuity between westward expansion across the continent and the new overseas empire." Racializing concepts and epithets used domestically were extended to the people of the overseas territories.

Ota Benga, a Congolese Pygmy, was featured at the fair. Later he was held captive at the Bronx Zoo in New York, then featured in an exhibit on evolution alongside an orangutan in 1906, but public protest ended that.

In contrast, the Japan pavilion advanced the idea of a modern yet exotic culture unfamiliar to the turn-of-the-century Western world, much as it had during the earlier Chicago World's Fair. The Japanese government spent lavishly: $400,000, plus $50,000 from the Japanese colonial government of Formosa, with an additional $250,000 coming from Japanese commercial interests and regional governments; all told, this totaled $700,000 (equivalent to $25.1 million in 2025). A 150,000-square-foot (14,000 m^{2}) garden, set on the hillside south of the Machinery Hall and Engine House, featured a replica of Kyoto's famous Kinkakuji, showing Japan's ancient sophistication, and a Formosa Mansion and Tea House, showing her modern colonial efforts. A second exhibition, "Fair Japan on the 'Pike'", organized by Kushibiki and Arai, welcomed the public through a large Niōmon-style gate into a realm of geisha-staffed exotic Japanese consumerism. Ainu people were displayed at the exhibit as well.

In 2025, a historical marker was placed in the Wydown-Skinker neighborhood to commemorate the location of the Philippine Village, following years of advocacy by Filipino American artist Janna Añonuevo Langholz.

=== Exhibits ===
After the fair was completed, many of the international exhibits were not returned to their country of origin, but were dispersed to museums in the United States. For example, the Philippine exhibits were acquired by the Museum of Natural History at the University of Iowa. The Vulcan statue is today a prominent feature of the Vulcan Park and Museum in Birmingham, Alabama, where it was originally cast.

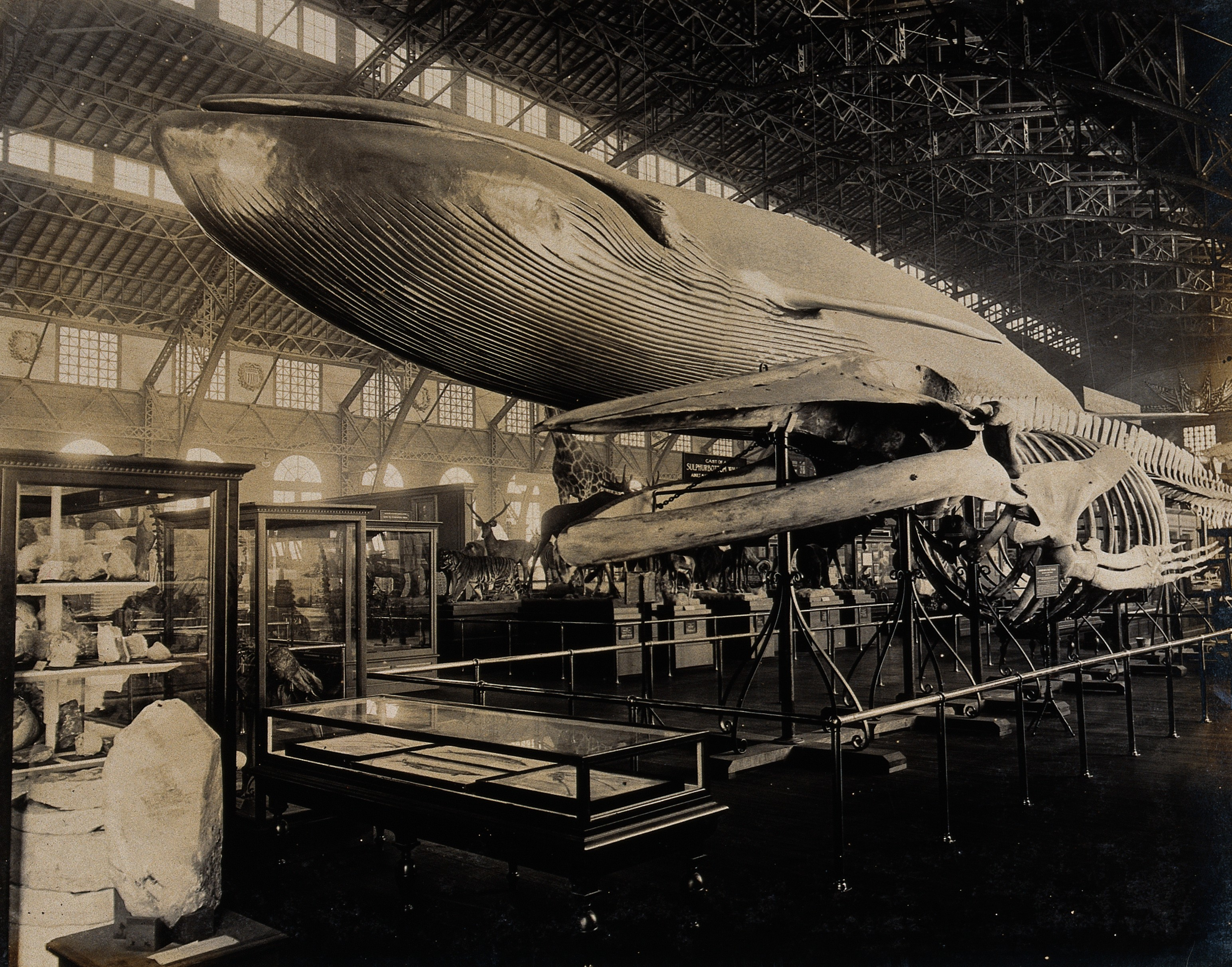
Natural History exhibit at the 1904 World's Fair, St. Louis.

The Smithsonian Institution coordinated the US government exhibits. It featured a blue whale, the first full-cast of a blue whale ever created.

One exhibit of note was Beautiful Jim Key, the "educated" Arabian-Hambletonian cross horse in his Silver Horseshoe Pavilion. He was owned by Dr. William Key, an African-American/Native American former slave, who became a respected self-taught veterinarian, and promoted by Albert R. Rogers, who had Jim and Dr. Key on tour for years around the US, helping to establish a humane movement that encouraged people to think of animals as having feelings and thoughts, and not just "brutes". Jim and Dr. Key became national celebrities along the way. Rogers invented highly successful marketing strategies still in use today. Jim Key could add, subtract, use a cash register, spell with blocks, tell time and give opinions on the politics of the day by shaking his head yes or no. Jim thoroughly enjoyed his "act"—he performed more than just tricks and appeared to clearly understand what was going on. Dr. Key's motto was that Jim "was taught by kindness" instead of the whip, which he was indeed.

Daisy E. Nirdlinger's book, Althea, or, the children of Rosemont plantation (illustrated by Egbert Cadmus (1868–1939)) was adopted by the Commissioners of the Louisiana Purchase Exposition as the official souvenir for young people.

== Olympics ==
The Fair hosted the 1904 Summer Olympic Games, the first Olympics to be held in the United States: the Games had originally been awarded to Chicago, but after St. Louis threatened to hold a rival international competition in the same timeframe, the Games were relocated.

Nonetheless, the sporting events, spread out over several months, were overshadowed by the Fair. Due to high travel costs and European tensions arising from the Russo-Japanese War, many European athletes did not attend the Games, nor did the founder of the modern Olympics, Baron Pierre de Coubertin.

== Bullfight riot ==
On June 5, 1904, a bullfight scheduled for an arena just north of the fairgrounds, in conjunction with the fair, turned violent when Missouri governor Alexander Monroe Dockery ordered police to halt the fight in light of Missouri's anti-bullfighting laws. Disgruntled spectators demanded refunds, and when they were turned away, they began throwing stones through the windows of the arena office. While police protected the office, they did not have sufficient numbers to protect the arena, which was burned to the ground by the mob. The exposition fire department responded to the fire, but disruption to the fair was minimal, as the riot took place on a Sunday, when the fair was closed.

== Anglo-Boer War Concession ==
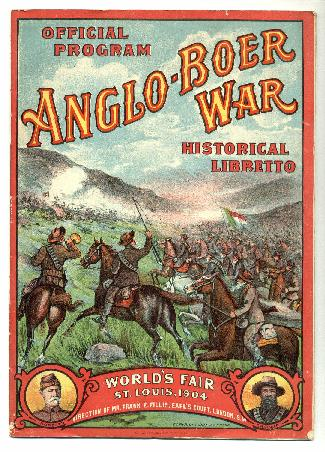
Anglo-Boer War program sold at the exhibition

Frank E. Fillis produced what was supposedly "the greatest and most realistic military spectacle known in the history of the world". Different portions of the concession featured a British Army encampment, several South African native villages (including Zulu, San, Swazi, and Ndebele) and a 15-acre (61,000 m^{2}) arena in which soldiers paraded, sporting events and horse races were held and major battles from the Second Boer War were re-enacted twice a day. Battle recreations took 2–3 hours and included several generals and 600 veteran soldiers from both sides of the war. At the conclusion of the show, the Boer general Christiaan de Wet would escape on horseback by leaping from a height of 35 feet (11 m) into a pool of water.

Admission ranged from 25 cents (equivalent to $8.96 in 2025) for bleacher seats to one dollar (equivalent to $35.83 in 2025) for box seats, and admission to the villages was another 25 cents. The concession cost $48,000 (equivalent to $1.72 million in 2025) to construct, grossed over $630,000 (equivalent to $22.6 million in 2025), and netted about $113,000 (equivalent to $4.05 million in 2025) to the fair—the highest-grossing military concession of the fair.

== Notable attendees ==
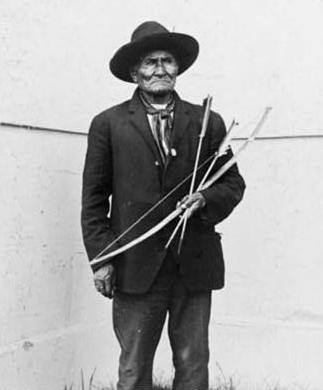
Geronimo, photographed by the fair's official photographer, William H. Rau

The Louisiana World's Fair was opened by President, Theodore Roosevelt, by telegraph, but he did not attend personally until after his reelection in November 1904, as he stated he did not wish to use the fair for political purposes. Attendees included John Philip Sousa, a musician, composer and conductor whose band performed on opening day and several times during the fair. Thomas Edison is claimed to have attended.

Ragtime music was popularly featured at the Fair. Scott Joplin wrote "The Cascades" specifically for the fair, inspired by the waterfalls at the Grand Basin, and presumably attended the fair.

Helen Keller, who was 24 and graduated from Radcliffe College, gave a lecture in the main auditorium.

The French organist Alexandre Guilmant played a series of 40 recitals from memory on the great organ in Festival Hall, then the largest pipe organ in the world, including Toccata in D minor (Op. 108, No. 1) by Albert Renaud, which Renaud had dedicated to Guilmant.

Geronimo, the former war chief of the Apache, was "on display" in a teepee in the Ethnology Exhibit.

Grover Cleveland, the 22nd and 24th president, attended the opening ceremony on April 30 and "overshadowed President Roosevelt in popular applause, when both stood on the same platform."

Henri Poincaré gave a keynote address on mathematical physics, including an outline for what would eventually become known as special relativity.

Jelly Roll Morton did not visit, stating in his later Library of Congress interview and recordings that he expected jazz pianist Tony Jackson would attend and win a jazz piano competition at the Exposition. Morton said he was "quite disgusted" to later learn that Jackson had not attended either, and that the competition had been won instead by Alfred Wilson; Morton considered himself a better pianist than Wilson.

The poet T. S. Eliot, who was born and raised in St. Louis, Missouri, visited the Igorot Village held in the Philippine Exposition section of the St. Louis World's Fair. Several months after the closing of the World's Fair, he published a short story entitled "The Man Who Was King" in the school magazine of Smith Academy, St. Louis, Missouri, where he was a student. Inspired by the ganza dance that the Igorot people presented regularly in the Village and their reaction to "civilization", the poet explored the interaction of a white man with the island culture. All this predates the poet's delving into the anthropological studies during his Harvard graduate years.

Max Weber visited upon first coming to the United States in hopes of using some of his findings for a case study on capitalism.

Jack Daniel, the American distiller and the founder of Jack Daniel's Tennessee whiskey distillery, entered his Tennessee whiskey into the World's Fair whiskey competition. After four hours of deliberation, the eight judges awarded Jack Daniel's Tennessee Whiskey the Gold Medal for the finest whiskey in the world. The award was a boon for the Jack Daniel's distillery.

Novelist Kate Chopin lived nearby and purchased a season ticket to the fair. After her visit on the hot day of August 20, she suffered a brain hemorrhage and died two days later, on August 22, 1904.

Philadelphia mercantilist, John Wanamaker, visited the exposition in November 1904 and purchased an entire collection of German furniture which included the giant jugendstil brass sculpture of an eagle that he would display in the rotunda of his Wanamaker's department store in Philadelphia. In 1909 Wanamaker also purchased the organ from the fair, which at the time was the biggest pipe organ in the world. It is still featured today, much enlarged, as the Wanamaker Organ in the Grand Court of his Philadelphia retail palace. Wanamaker purchased and donated an ancient Egyptian tomb, a mummy and other relics to the University Museum of the University of Pennsylvania.

Benedictine monk, artist and museum founder, Fr. Gregory Gerrer, OSB, exhibited his recent portrait of Pope Pius X at the fair. Following the fair, Gerrer brought the painting to Shawnee, Oklahoma, where it is now on display at the Mabee-Gerrer Museum of Art.

John McCormack, Irish tenor, was brought to the fair by James A. Reardon, who was in charge of the Irish exhibit.

The Sundance Kid visited the exposition, accompanied by Etta Place.

== Commemoration ==
In conjunction with the Exposition the US Post Office issued a series of five commemorative stamps celebrating the 100th anniversary of the Louisiana Purchase. The 1-cent value portrays Robert Livingston, the ambassador who negotiated the purchase with France; the 2-cent value depicts Thomas Jefferson, who executed the purchase; the 3-cent honors James Monroe, who participated in negotiations with the French; the 5-cent memorializes William McKinley, who was involved with early plans for the Exposition; and the 10-cent presents a map of the Louisiana Purchase.

Louisiana Purchase Commemoratives

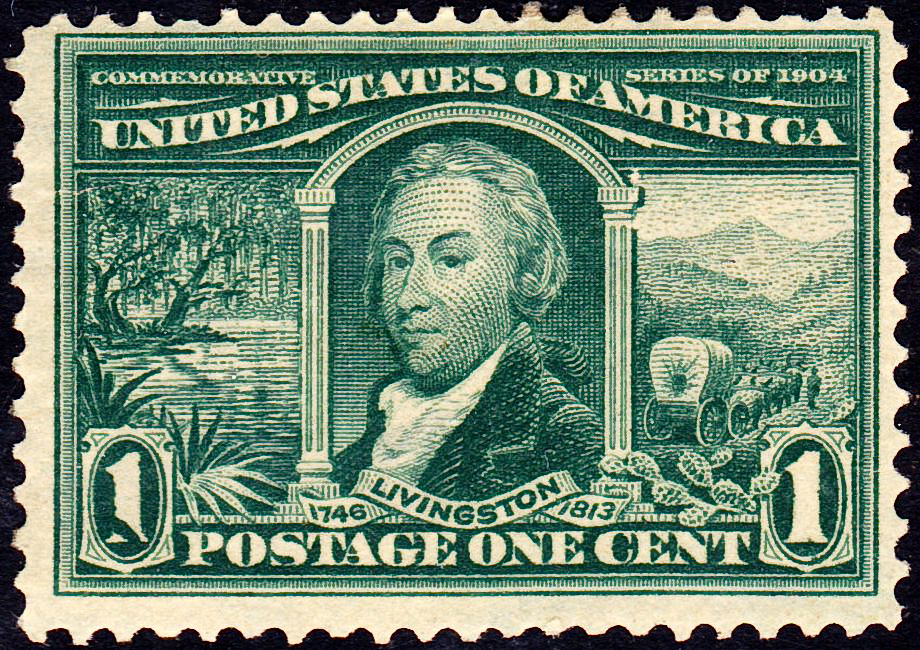
Robert Livingston

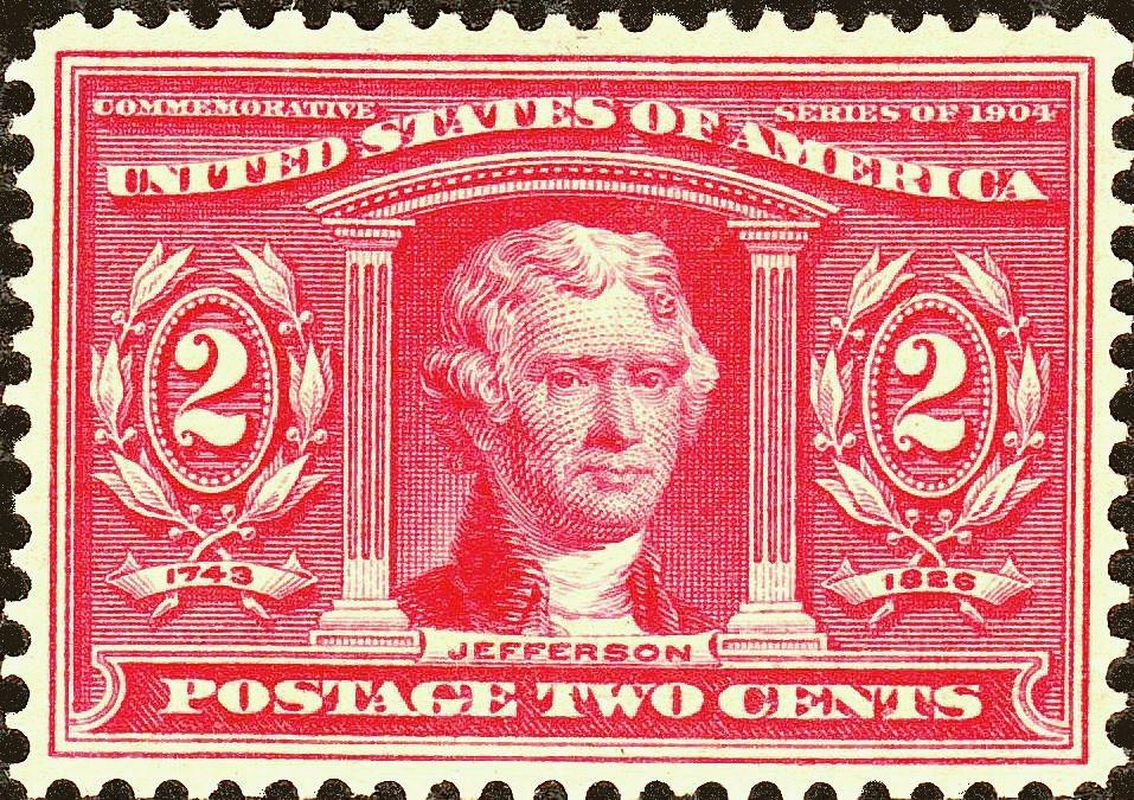
Thomas Jefferson

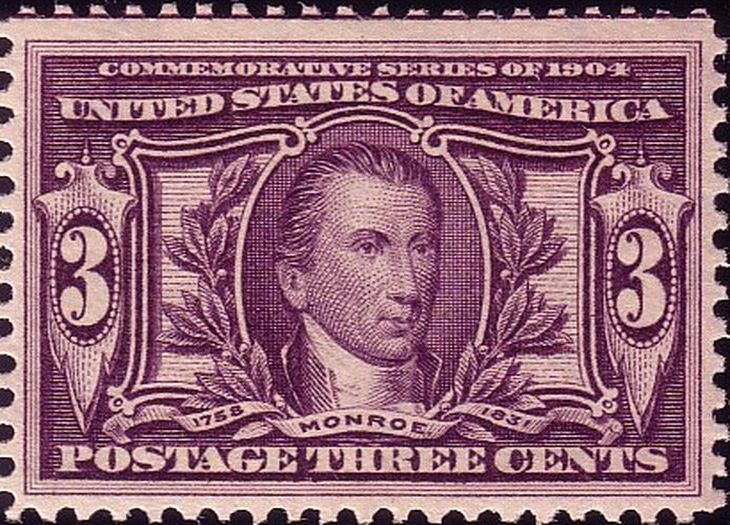
James Monroe

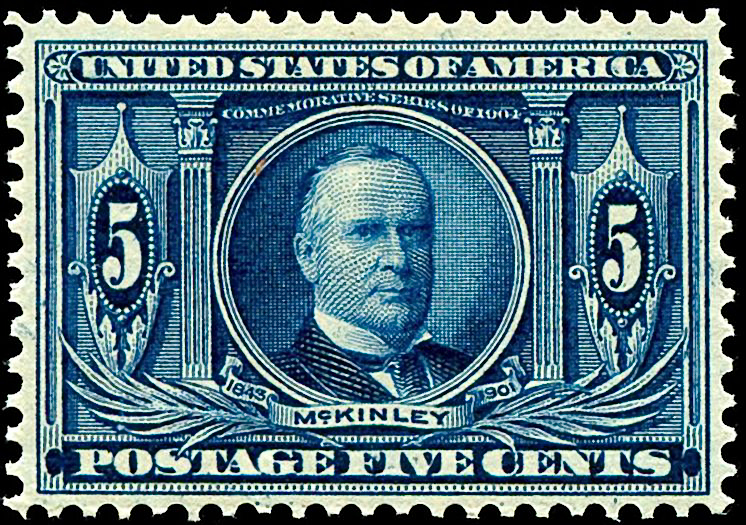
William McKinley

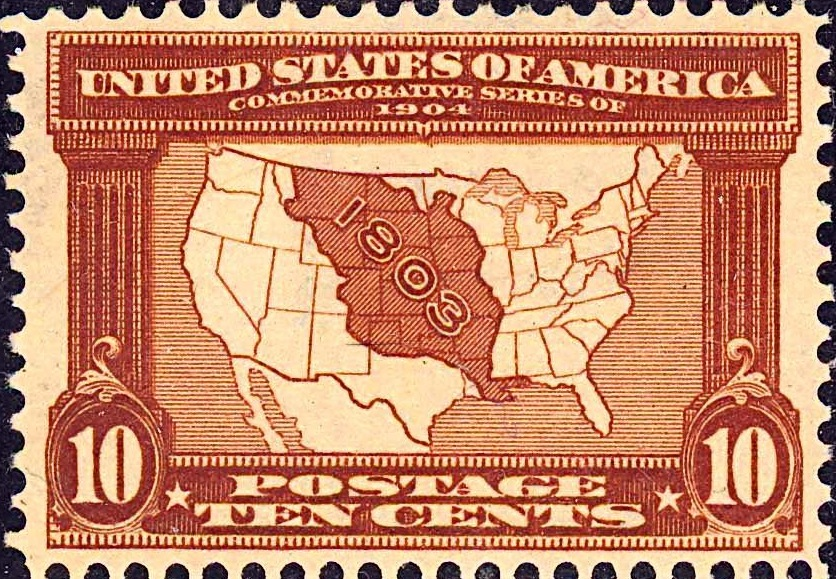
Map of the Louisiana Purchase

== See also ==
- Swedish Pavilion from the 1904 St. Louis World's Fair
- 1904 Summer Olympics
- Central West End, St. Louis
- Forest Park
- Meet Me in St. Louis
- Saint Louis Exposition (1884)
- St. Louis, Missouri
- University City, Missouri
- Washington University in St. Louis
- World's Largest Cedar Bucket
- List of world expositions
- List of world's fairs
