= Louis Wollbrinck =

Civil Servant

Louis Wollbrinck, from the 1905 History of the Louisiana Purchase Exposition

Louis Wollbrinck (1867–1928; spelling variations include "Wollbrink" and "Wolbrinck") was a civil servant, entrepreneur and builder in St. Louis, Missouri during the Gilded Age.

== Biography ==
Wollbrinck was born in St. Louis on Friday, Feb. 22, 1867, to a German carpenter and his wife. Friederich "Fred" Wollbrinck and Johannah (Hannah) Kottmeier had both come from Herford, in Westphalia. Louis Wollbrinck left school at twelve to become an errand boy for Woodward and Tiernan printing, then pressman, and stayed 5 years. He then worked as feeder and pressman for the Great Western Show Printing Co. until he was 24. Turning to real estate and building, he was the youngest builder in St. Louis, with 65 houses going up at once. The Historic American Buildings Survey documented the north side of the 4900 block of Page Avenue in 1986, when it was still covered in the moderately sized, modestly ornamented homes Wollbrinck built for a rising merchant-class. (images have been released to the public domain).

Wollbrinck was nearly bankrupted in a downturn of the housing market, but under the name "Central Amusement Company" he ran "Old St. Louis" and another concession at the 1904 St. Louis World's Fair, after which he became a clerk in the Assessor's office (until 1908, when he was shuffled out in a change of administration). He returned to real estate, organized Everybody's Amusement Company and ran an open-air theater at the corner of Taylor and Delmar. He was a staunch Republican, and though he lost the 1918 election for City Assessor (the Progressives split the bloc and gave the office to Democrat Frank Schramm) St. Louis Mayor Henry Kiel took advantage of a provision of the new city charter to fire Schramm and appoint Wollbrinck. There followed a legal struggle and a nine-months suit before the Missouri Supreme Court. During his tenure, he instituted the state’s income tax, upheld in the often-cited Ludlow-Saylor Wire Co vs. Wollbrinck case. On February 13, 1923, he was granted U.S. patent #1444822, for improvements in the design of the spark plug.

Wollbrinck married Louise Gelser of St. Louis, December 5, 1906; their children were Louis, Edward G., Lanita (m. Clements), Vida (m. Voss) and Ferda (died in childhood). Louis Wollbrinck died of arteriosclerosis at the age of 61 on June 24, 1928, and was interred at Valhalla Cemetery, St. Louis.
