= WOVM =

Radio station in Appleton, Wisconsin

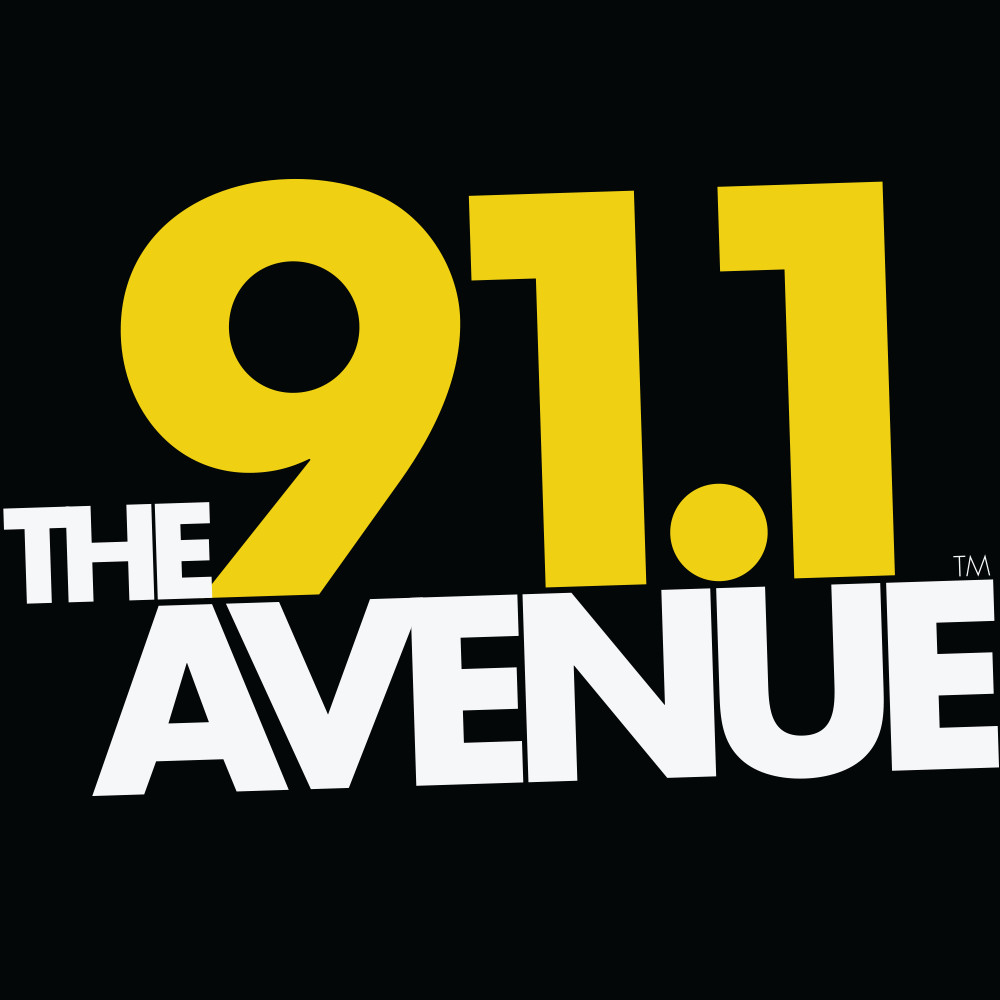
- Appleton, Wisconsin; United States
- Frequency: 91.1 MHz
- Branding: The Avenue

Programming
- Format: Adult Album Alternative

Ownership
- Owner: Music That Matters, Inc.

History
- First air date: March 10, 1956
- Former call signs: WLFM (1956–2005)

Technical information
- Licensing authority: FCC
- Facility ID: 36786
- Class: C2
- ERP: 42,000 watts
- HAAT: 98 meters (322 feet)
- Transmitter coordinates: 44°09′46″N 88°14′37″W

Links
- Public license information: Public file; LMS
- Website: www.avenueradio.com

WOVM (91.1 FM, "The Avenue") is a non-commercial American radio station licensed to Appleton, Wisconsin. The station is owned by Music That Matters, Inc.

The station was assigned the WOVM call letters by the Federal Communications Commission on September 20, 2005. Prior to that time, WOVM was WLFM, the radio station of Lawrence University in Appleton.

== History ==
=== WLFM at Lawrence University ===
Lawrence University, then known as Lawrence College, received the construction permit to build a new, 10,500-watt radio station on November 30, 1955. WLFM began broadcasting March 10, 1956. The station, airing educational programming, was made possible by the donation of the transmitter used in operating the former WJPG-FM in Green Bay, the station of the Green Bay Press-Gazette newspaper. It also holds the distinction of being Wisconsin's oldest noncommercial FM station not part of the Wisconsin Public Radio state network.

WLFM had been on the air less than two months when a Soviet flag was fastened to the tower in a prank. In its early years, the station broadcast on Tuesday and Thursday evenings and for eight hours on Saturdays.

The studios of WLFM moved in 1960 from their original quarters in a former gymnasium into studios in the college's new music and drama building. The transmitter was relocated to another site three years later to accommodate a new science building; the old tower was sold to a motel for advertising purposes, to avoid incurring the expense of dismantling it. Several years later, the Great Midwest Trivia Contest, broadcast over an entire weekend, began; it would become a fixture of WLFM and continues to air on the college's internet station each year.

The station is no longer active, and has been replaced by SOL (Students Of Lawrence)/WLFM Studios.

=== Wisconsin Public Radio alliance ===
In the second half of the 1980s, WLFM also established a relationship with the Wisconsin Public Radio network; in 1985, it began simulcasting its morning programming with Appleton-focused news and weather inserts. The next year, it began carrying additional talk programs from the network to allow WPNE to air more music. However, the deepening ties were catalyzed in 1989 when a student disc jockey made a drug-related joke; he was suspended, and an official evaluation described WLFM as "an embarrassment to the university". In October 1990, WPR took over operations of the station, with Lawrence contributing 30 to 45 hours a week of student-produced programming, football coverage, and the Trivia Contest, whose status was previously in doubt due to the WPR takeover. WLFM and WGBW (91.5 FM) at the University of Wisconsin–Green Bay simulcast the "Wisconsin Ideas Service", complementing the music on WPNE. Lawrence's output offered additional "alternative" programming.

The two-network arrangement, consisting of WPNE's music programming and WGBW and WLFM's Ideas simulcast, would change dramatically as WPR launched a second station in Green Bay, WHID (88.1 FM), in 1997. Lawrence University had long desired to carry the classical music service, not Ideas, because it was a conservatory of music, but WLFM remained with the Ideas Network through 2005. The transmitter site was relocated in the summer of 1997 in order to accommodate another new campus building; for the first time, the facility would not be located on the Lawrence campus, but it would be on a taller tower.

=== Relevant Radio and Music That Matters ===
On June 23, 2005, citing declining interest, aging equipment and high costs to add HD Radio, Lawrence University announced its intention to convert WLFM into an internet-only radio station for the 2005-2006 school year. The university had already been streaming WLFM online; in 2002, the trivia contest was broadcast over the internet for the first time. The webcast would not air the WPR programs that WLFM had simulcast for 20 years.

The university sold the license to Starboard Media of Allouez, owner of the Relevant Radio Catholic religious network, and after a week of silence, 91.1 returned as WOVM (standing for "Our Virgin Mary"), offering Relevant Radio's programming. For Relevant, the purchase offered a better nighttime signal over WJOK (1050 AM), the network's station in Green Bay.

Relevant retained WOVM for less than two years. Music That Matters, Inc., a nonprofit corporation associated with for-profit radio company Sovereign City Communications, began planning to buy WOVM in late 2007 and use it as a test bed to syndicate a new hybrid adult contemporary radio format. The format, under the name "The Oasis", debuted on WOVM on January 7, 2008. That April, Music That Matters reached a deal to acquire WOVM directly from Relevant Radio for $700,000 in debt forgiveness.

In 2009, WOVM dropped its "The Oasis" format for a lounge jazz format known as "The Avenue"; the new format had debuted as a fill-in when Sovereign City Communications closed in January. In June 2011, WOVM's format segued to gold-based adult album alternative.

In 2014, WOVM held a $1 million dollar fundraiser to continue its operation; by the beginning of 2015, it had raised over $700,000 from listeners and business supporters. While the goal was not met, the money raised was enough to keep The Avenue running through the end of the year, though the station continued to ask for donations to assist the non-profit organizations it supported.
