= World's Largest Cedar Bucket =

Coordinates: 35°50′37.52″N 86°23′48.97″W

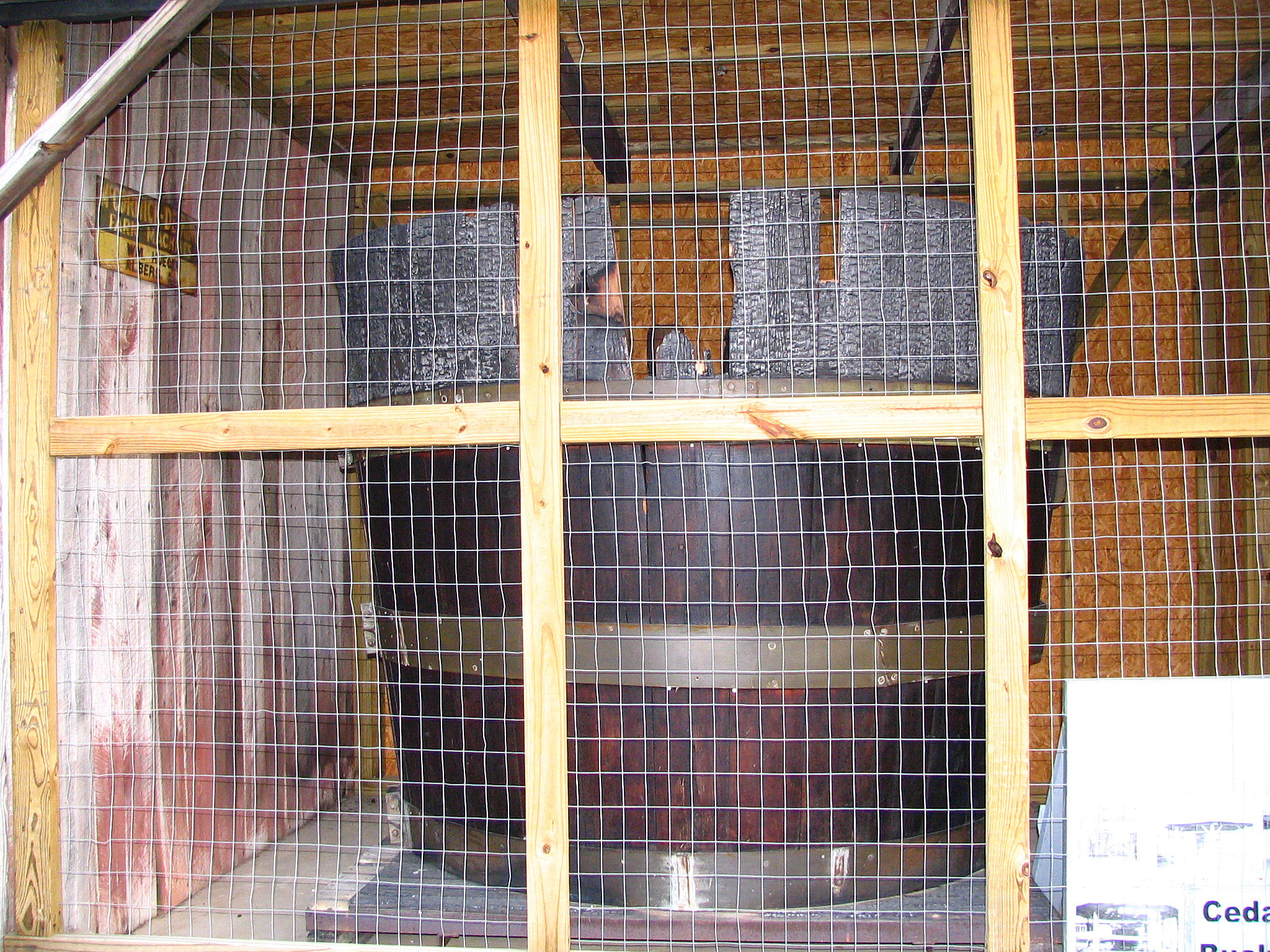
The bucket after the 2005 fire

The World's Largest Cedar Bucket is a 1,556 imperial gallons (7,070 L) red cedar bucket in Murfreesboro, Tennessee. The bucket is approximately 6 feet (1.8 m) tall, with diameters of 6 feet (1.8 m) at its base and 9 feet (2.7 m) at its top.

== History ==
The bucket was built in 1887 by the Tennessee Red Cedar Woodenworks Company from Murfreesboro, Tennessee. It was originally displayed in Murfreesboro, until it was displayed at the 1893 Chicago World's Fair and the 1904 Saint Louis World's Fair. The cedar bucket factory burned down in 1952, and local grocer Crigger’s Market bought the item to display it. It was auctioned off in approximately 1965 and it was purchased by a Rossville, Georgia, amusement park. It was returned to Murfreesboro in 1976 to be displayed at Cannonsburgh Village.

=== Arson ===
On June 19, 2005, the bucket was burned by arsonists. The fire was put out before any adjacent buildings were burned down. Roadside America described the condition of the bucket as "Severely damaged, the bucket is now blackened and splintered charcoal shards held together by metal bands."

=== Rebuilding ===
On October 22, 2011, a refurbished bucket was unveiled at the 35th annual Harvest Days Festival in Cannonsburgh Pioneer Village. In a partnership between Roy Haney’s sawmill in Cannon County and the Rutherford County Blacksmiths’ Association, high quality, rare red cedar was collected to restore the bucket to its former glory.
