= Bagra, Jalore =

Bagra
- Village
- Location in Rajasthan, India Bagra (India)
- Coordinates: 25°12′0″N 72°35′0″E
- Country: India
- State: Rajasthan
- District: Jalore district
- Elevation: 152 m (499 ft)

Population (2011)
  - Total: 12,039

Languages
  - Official: Marwadi
- Time zone: UTC+5:30 (IST)
- Postal code: 343025
- Vehicle registration: RJ-16
- Lok Sabha constituency: Jalore

Bagra is a village in the Jalore district in the Marwar region in Rajasthan state in India. Bagra lies 18 km south of the town of Jalore on Jalore-Sirohi road.

== History ==
Bagra was famous in India for its speculative trade in silver and gold. It was also called "Dilli Me Agra" aur "Marwad Me Bagra", because all the speculative transactions of Marwad were settled in Bagra.

Before independence, this village was part of Marwar / Jodhpur State and was a Jagir village of Digandi Rajpurohits. Jagarawal Mansinghji Rajpurohit of Bagra took part in the Marwar Farmer's Movement and Indian freedom Movement against British rule in India.

"This is not a time to retreat until the better times return."- JAGARWAL MANSINGH G RAJPUROHIT BAGRA

== People ==
In Bagra, there are 2,143 households and a total population of 12,039 people. Of these, 6,223 are males and 5,816 are females. The village has a slightly higher number of men compared to women.

== Temples ==
Local

- Shree Chintamani Parshvanatha Jain Temple. This is the main Jain temple of the village, situated in the centre of the village. It was renovated about 100 years ago under the guidance and by inspiration of Gurudev Srimad Vijay Acharya Rajendrasuri.
- Shri Mahavir Swami Jain Temple, Bus Stand Bagra
- Baba Ramdevji and Thakurji Lord Krishna Temple. It is at the Bagra bus station. It has representative icons of Baba Ramdevji and Lord Krishna and Radha. It is the main temple for villagers. It was renovated in 2006, funds for which were contributed by all villagers under the inspiration and guidance of Seth Shri MangiLalji Bhabutaji Ghodawala.
- Step-well - There is a bawdi behind the Mahavir Swami Jain Temple. It was the main source of water for drinking and domestic use for the villagers prior to the advent of plumbing in 1968.

Nearby

- Jagnath Mahadevji Temple, a very old Lord Shiva temple, and Matha about 13 km to east of Bagra situated in Esrana Hills
- Baba Ramdevji Temple, also known as Gayatri Ashram on Bagra - Santhu Road. Holy Ashram of Bal Brahmachari Shri 1008 Shri Shankar Swaroopji Maharaj disciple of Pujyapad Jagadguru Shankaracharyaji Maharaj of Dwaraka Pitha.
- New Dvarikapuri Dham bagra, Jalore - Bhinmal Rd, Bagra, Rajasthan

== Facts ==
Latitude 25.2000°, Longitude 72.5833°, Altitude 501 feet

Lat. (DMS) 25° 12' N, Long. (DMS) 72° 35' E, Altitude 152 meters

The town's railway station is Marwar Bagra and is on the Samdari-Bhildi section of North Western Railway. The Railway Board converted this meter gauge route to broad gauge in 2010.

Bus lines run to nearby towns, but the nearest commercial airports are at Jodhpur and Udaipur.
