= Mohankheda =

Śvetāmbara Jain temple in Madhya Pradesh, India

Mohankheda Tirtha
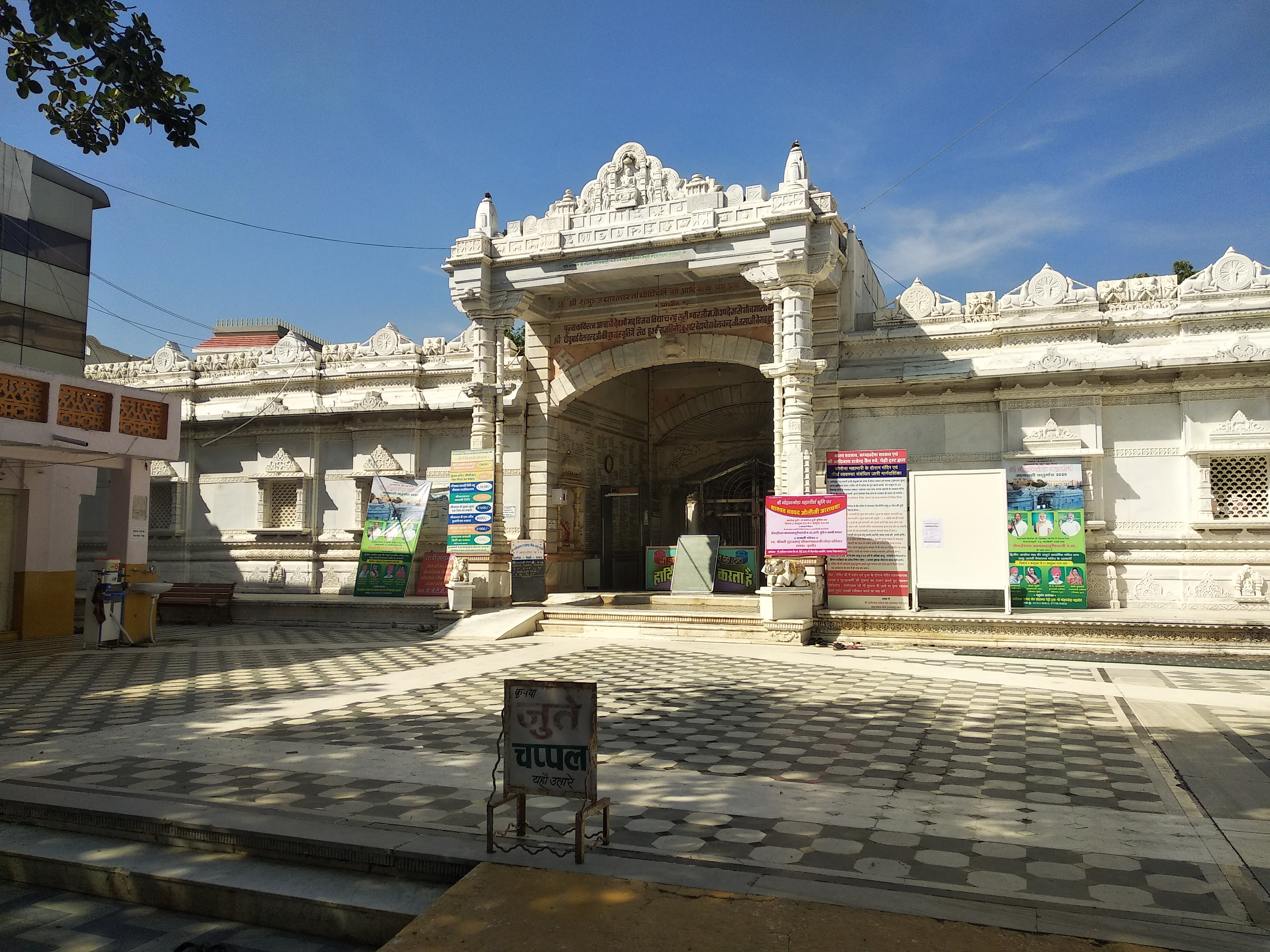
- Mohankheda Jain temple

- Location in Madhya Pradesh, India

Religion
- Affiliation: Jainism
- Sect: Śvetāmbara
- Deity: Rishabhanatha
- Festival: Mahavir Jayanti

Location
- Location: Mohankheda, Dhar, Madhya Pradesh, India
- Coordinates: 22°40′24.8″N 74°55′18.3″E

Architecture
- Creator: Acharya Rajendrasuri
- Established: 1884
- Temple: 1

Mohan Kheda is a Śvetāmbara Jain tirtha (pilgrimage place) located in the Dhar district of Madhya Pradesh in India. The site is situated 105 kilometres (65 mi) from Indore and 47 km (29 mi) from Dhar on the Indore-Ahmedabad Highway. It was established by Acharya Rajendrasuri (1826–1906), around 1884 and is today an important Gyana kshetra or Jain center of learning as well.

This tirtha has a 16-foot-tall (4.9 m) statue of the first Tirthankara, in the lotus position, and the samadhi derasar of Acharyas Rajendrasuri, Yatindrasuri and Vidhyachandrasuri. A fair is held here every year on the fifteenth day of the bright half of the month of Kartika, the month of Chaitra, and the seventh day of the bright half of the month of Pausha.

== History ==
In 1884, the reformer Acharya Rajendrasuri was wandering about through this place, seeing the natural and peaceful atmosphere. He predicted that this land would rise in holiness, and there would be a great tirtha. Accordingly, a holy tirtha came into existence here.

In 1884, on Margshirsha Shukla 7th, all Jina bimbas including Rishab Bhagwan were established after anjan shalaka by Pujya Gurudev Rajendrasuri ji. Pujya Gurudev declared after puja that this derasar will be called a great pilgrim place. It should be named "Mohankheda" hence after.

In 1906, Acharya Rajendrasuri died in Rajgarh. Thousands of his disciples bid him goodbye and paid their last homage to him on the ground of Jinalaya on Pausha Sudi 7th. His disciples constructed a memorial samadhi temple, and a fair started taking place on Pausha Sudi 7th.

Mohankheda Tirtha is over 132 years old and full of peaceful atmosphere. The old temple was renovated in 1957, and its murti were re-established by the chief disciple of Yatindrasuri and Chandrasuri. The new temple has images of Rishabhanatha, Parshvanatha and others. In front of Jinalaya, there is a temple memorialising Rajendrasuri. There is another in front of this one in the memory of Dhanchandrasuri, including statues of Shrimad Bupendra Surishwarji and Mohan Vijayji. On the main gate, a temple has been built in memory of chief disciples of Yatindrasuri, and near Dharmashala there is a memorial temple of motivator builder of renovated temple, Shrimada Vijaya Vidyachandra Surishwarji. Both of the gurus had sought salvation on this holy land.

Today Mohankheda has developed as a grand place of pilgrimage. There are many big rest houses, having 500 rooms for the comfort and convenience of the visitors. The visitors get free breakfast, lunch and dinner under the care of 'Shri Adinath Rajendra Jain Shwetamber Cheritable Trust'. Adinath Jain Gurukul is being run in connection with training of Jain culture and religion. There are also three academic schools named: Shri Rajendra Vidhya Sanskar Vakita Progressive School, Shri Rajendra Vidhya Sankar Dham, and Guru Rajendra Jain International School. All these three schools are run by Shri Mohankheda Tirth Trust.

== Guru Saptami Mahotsav ==
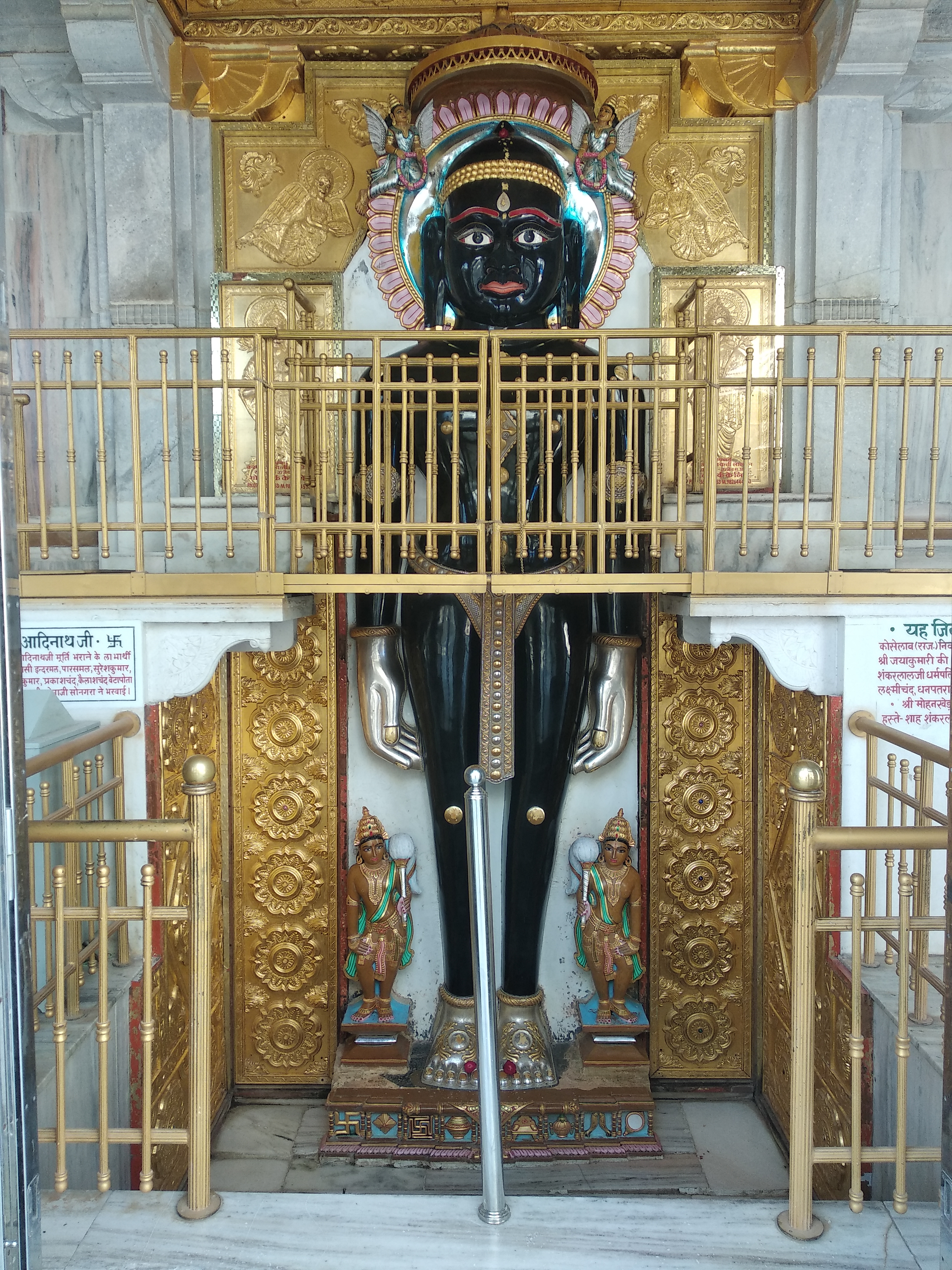
16 feet (4.9 m) Rishabhanatha statue

Acharya Rajendrasuri (1826–1906) was a major reformer of the 18th and 19th century in the Śvetāmbara sect of Jainism. He was born on 3 December 1827, at Bharatpur (Rajasthan), in the family of the businessman named Rishabhadas Parakh. His born name was Ratna Raj. He had a religious bent of mind. He renounced the worldly life and was initiated as Jain yati by Hemavijayaji at Udaipur in 1846 AD. He had studied diligently the Jain scriptures, philosophy, literature, grammar, rhetoric, lexicography, etc. under Acharya Pramodsuri and Jain Monk Sagarchandji, the well-known yatis of the age, and soon he acquired proficiency. He raised his voice against the corrupt and luxurious life of the Jain yatis and condemned their abundance of possession and insisted on a pious ideal life in accordance with the principles laid down by Jain Tirthankaras and Jain holy scriptures. He also took vigorous attempts to reform the institution of Jain yati and place it on sound, simple and rational principles, and get rid of its age old traditions and superstitions. Though opposed in the initial stages, the attempts of Rajendrasuri were ultimately crowned with success. As a result of this, the Jain yatis/Monk had given up their worldly life and surrendered their princely symbols like silver rods, chanwar, palkhi, arms, etc. to the Jain temples, and took solemn oath to lead a life of purity, simplicity, non-possession, non-violence, teaching and preaching. Thus Rajendrasuri reformed and simplified the Jain yati/monk institution, Tristutik sect of Jainism, and a new life of revivalism was infused in them. His other achievements were restoration and reconstruction of Jain temples and installation of Jain images and establishment of different socio-religious organizations for the uplift of the Jains and propagation of Jainism.

On Friday 21 December 1906, Vikram Samvat 1963 Poush Shukla Saptami, the great helping nature, Religious-Preacher Acharya Rajendrasuri laid down his body for the Moksha Prapti (for heaven) until death in a still Samadhi. He was considered a great saint, who was in his own a different kind, having the same day of birth and death.

Every year, devotees from all over the world (in lakhs) gather here to attain the Spiritual and Chamatkarik Aarti of Acharya Rajendrasuri on his birth and Nirvana day in the month of Poush Shukla paksha Saptami.
