= Santhu =

Village in Rajasthan, India

Saanthu Saanthoo
- village
- Location in Rajasthan, India
- Coordinates: 25°18′6″N 72°54′43″E
- Country: India
- State: Rajasthan
- District: Jalore
- Elevation: 152 m (499 ft)

Population
  - Total: 8,343

Languages
  - Official: Hindi, Marwari
- Time zone: UTC+5:30 (IST)
- PIN: 343025
- Telephone code: 91 2973
- Vehicle registration: RJ 16
- Nearest city: Bagra (Marwar)
- Lok Sabha constituency: Jalore
- Vidhan Sabha constituency: Jalore

Santhu is a village in Jalore in district of Marwar region in Rajasthan state of India. Santhu lies 23 km (14 mi) south of Jalore town and 5 km (3 mi) from Bagra on Jalore-Sirohi road and is surrounded by many villages like Noon (Nun), Chura, Sarat, Akoli, Narnavas, Bibalsar, Mok, Dhanpur, Bhagli Sindhalan, Rewat, Kalapura, Dakatara, Bakra Road, Sasan Berath, Bakra Gaon, Rewatada, Dudsi, Dhavala, Bhetala, Siana, and Deegaon.

== People ==
Santhu had a population of 9,720 as per the 2011 census.

== Transportation ==
Nearby railway station names are Marwar Bagra and Bakra Road. Santhu is on the Samadari-Bhildi section of North Western Railway. The conversion of the meter gauge rail route to broad gauge has been completed and direct trains from Mumbai have started running on this route to Bikaner via Jodhpur.

Santhu is well connected to nearby towns by all weather roads. Buses ply through Bagra to all major places. Taxis are available at all times for nearby places from Santhu, Bakra Road and Bagra.

Nearest air ports:

- Jodhpur 165 km
- Udaipur 195 km

Nearest air strips:

- Noon (Nun) 12 km
- Sirohi 60 km
- Abu Road 130 km
- Deesa

By road:

- Santhu to Jalore 25 km (16 mi)
- Santhu to Bhinmal 60 km (37 mi)
- Santhu to Jodhpur 165 km (103 mi)
- Santhu to Ahmedabad 360 km (224 mi)
- Santhu to Sirohi 60 km (37 mi)
- Santhu to Sirohi Road 85 km (53 mi)
- Santhu to Abu Road 130 km (81 mi)
- Santhu to Mount Abu 150 km (93 mi)
- Santhu to Jaisalmer 320 km (199 mi)
- Santhu to Ranakpur 115 km (71 mi)
- Santhu to Kheteshwar Brahmadham Tirtha kshetra Asotra 125 km
- Santhu to Kunwarda 50 km
- Santhu to Dudsi 10 km
- Santhu to Ramdevji Ka Mandir Bagra road 1 km

== Economy ==
Agriculture and animal husbandry are the main occupations of the people of Santhu. Santhu is a major production centre of cash crops like oilseeds, isabgol, jeera, and arandi in Jalore district. In the last decade many entrepreneurs have set up small scale granite units in nearby towns Bagra, Marwar and Jalore.

== Amenities ==
- For primary medicinal first aid there is a government primary hospital on Bagra Road constructed and maintained by Shri Pavnibai Kapurchandji Pratapji Charitable Trust, Chennai with aid provided by government.
- The facility for first aid for cattle and animals is provided in the government veterinarian hospital of the village.
- The good governance is provided by the elected Panchayat Samiti of the village.
- The nearby police station is situated in Bagra, Marwar.
- The post and telegraph office of the village provides all sort of postal facilities.
- The banking facility is provided by MGB Gramin Bank, Santhu.
- There is a separate community hall known as Rajpurohits Kotadi maintained by the large Rajpurohit community of the village.

== Special ==
- Shri Apeshwar Mahadev Gaushala set up in 2000 in the outskirts of the village, a shelter for cows. The Gaushala take care of the cows with public donation.
- Beautifully built Shri Apeshwar Mahadev Kabtoor Chowk in sandstone, a place for feeding pigeons and other birds is another place of charity run by the people of the village.
- A well, known as Somiyo Ro Kuo, was the main source of water supply in the village in olden days. It has recently been renovated and an additional bore well was also dug with public donations. It also acts as a drinking water facility for animals that pass by. Nowadays, Panchayat has provided water supply through pipelines with a good quality of drinking water.
- The good communication facility of basic telephone services along with good mobile network is provided by the government company BSNL and almost all other private companies.

== Places of interest ==
- Shree Apeshwar Mahadev ji Temple
  - This is a Hindu temple. Its principal deity is Shri Apeshwar Mahadev Ji (incarnation of Lord Shiva) who is also the Isht Dev of the people of Santhu.
- Shree Jogmayya Mata ji Temple
  - This is a Hindu temple. Its principal deity is Shri Jogmayya Mata Ji (Durga Mata Ji).
- Shree Varahi Mata Ji Teample
  - This is a Hindu temple. Its principal deity is Shri Varahi Mataji (one of the roop of Ma Durga) who is also the Kuldevi of the Santhua (a subcaste in Rajpurohits).
- Thakurji Mandir
- Sarneshwar Mahadev Mandir
- Shri Munisuvrata-Nemi-Parshva Jinalaya
  - This is a Jain temple. Its principal deities are Shri Munisuvrata Swami (twentieth Tirthankara), Neminatha (twenty-second Tirthankara) and Parshvanatha (twenty-third Tirthankara).

== Gallery ==
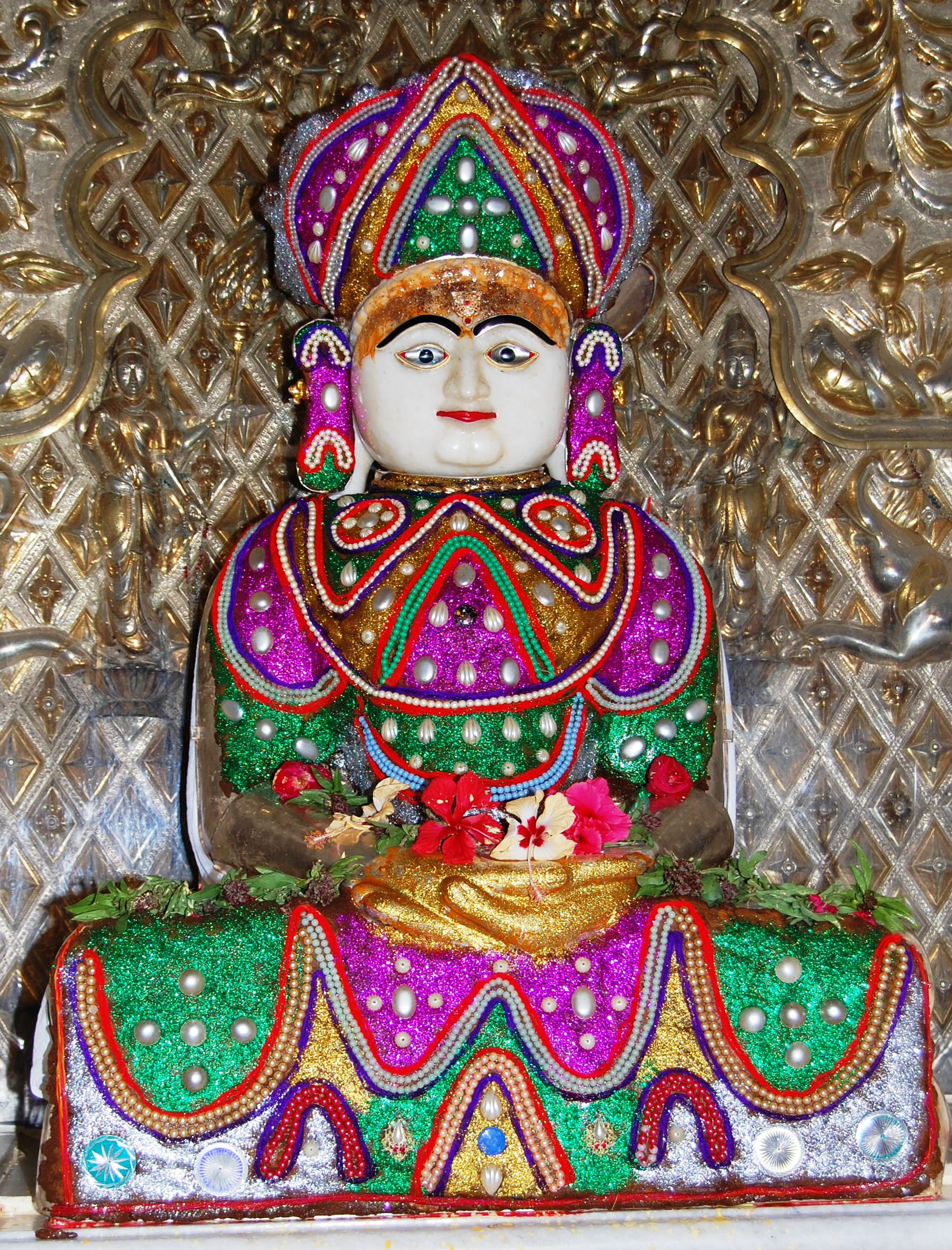
Shatrunjaya Avtaari Shri Adinath Bhagwan

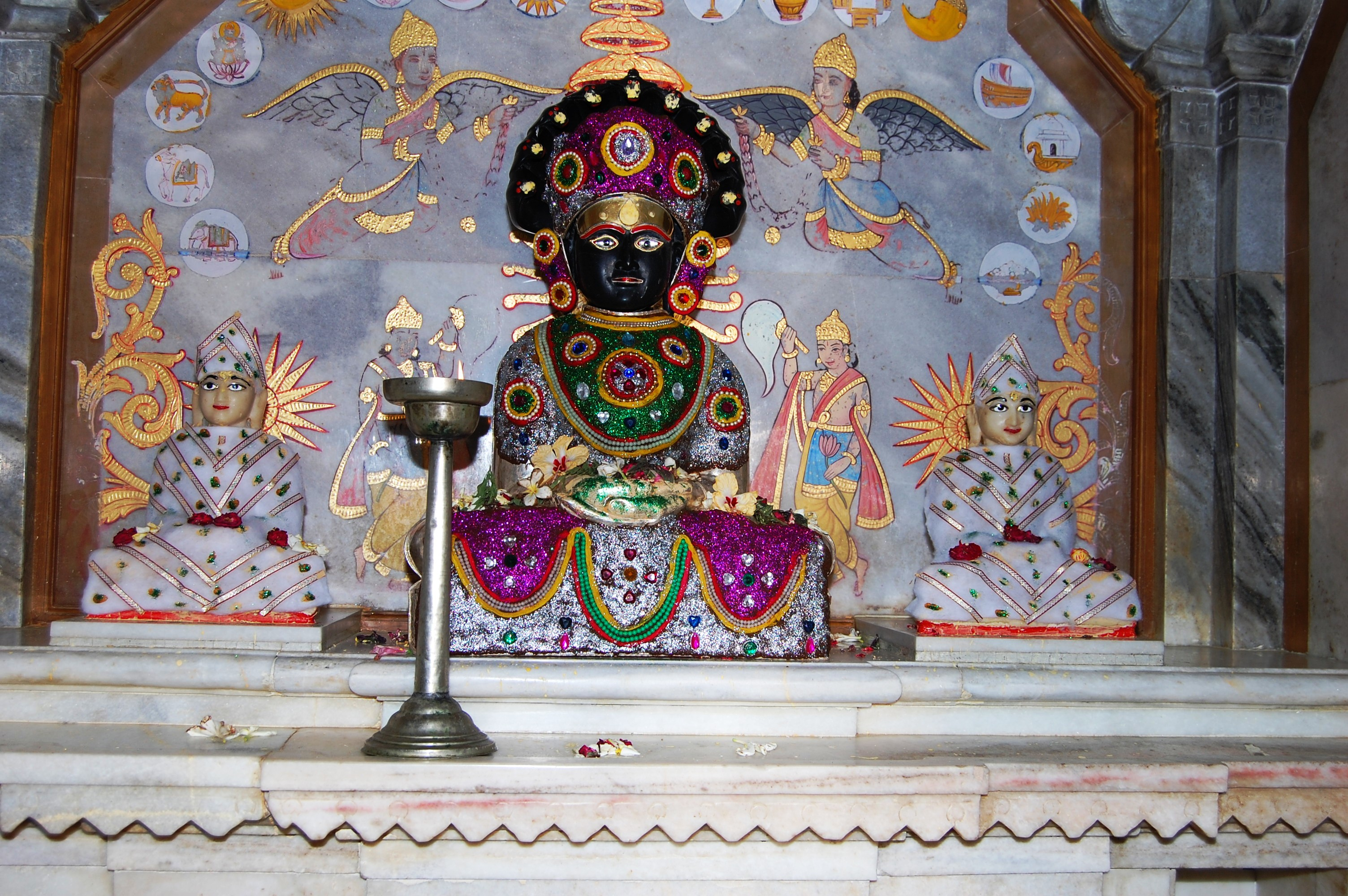
Lord Manmohan Parshvanath

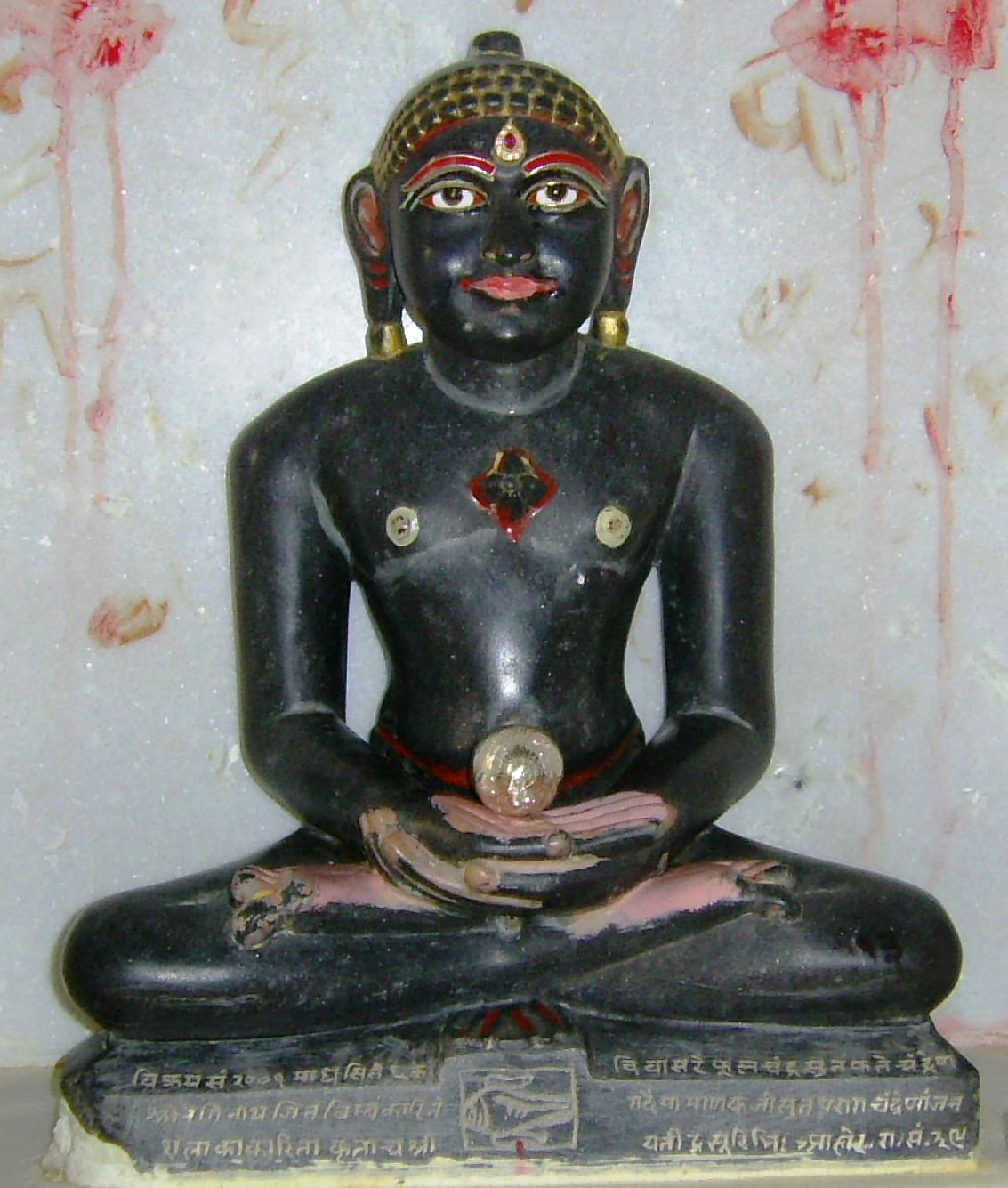
Shri Neminatha Bhagwan

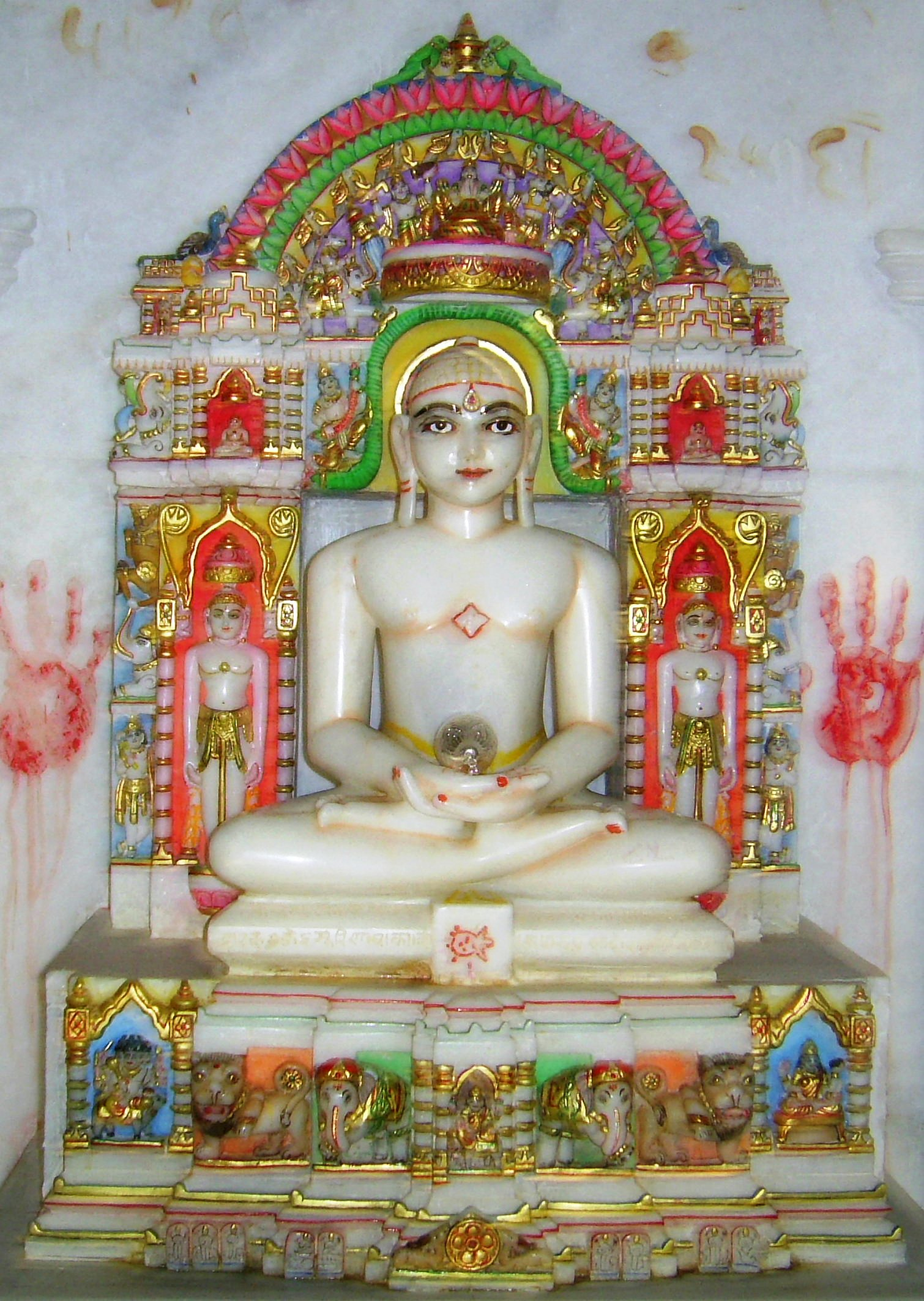
Shri Munisuvrata Swami Bhagwan

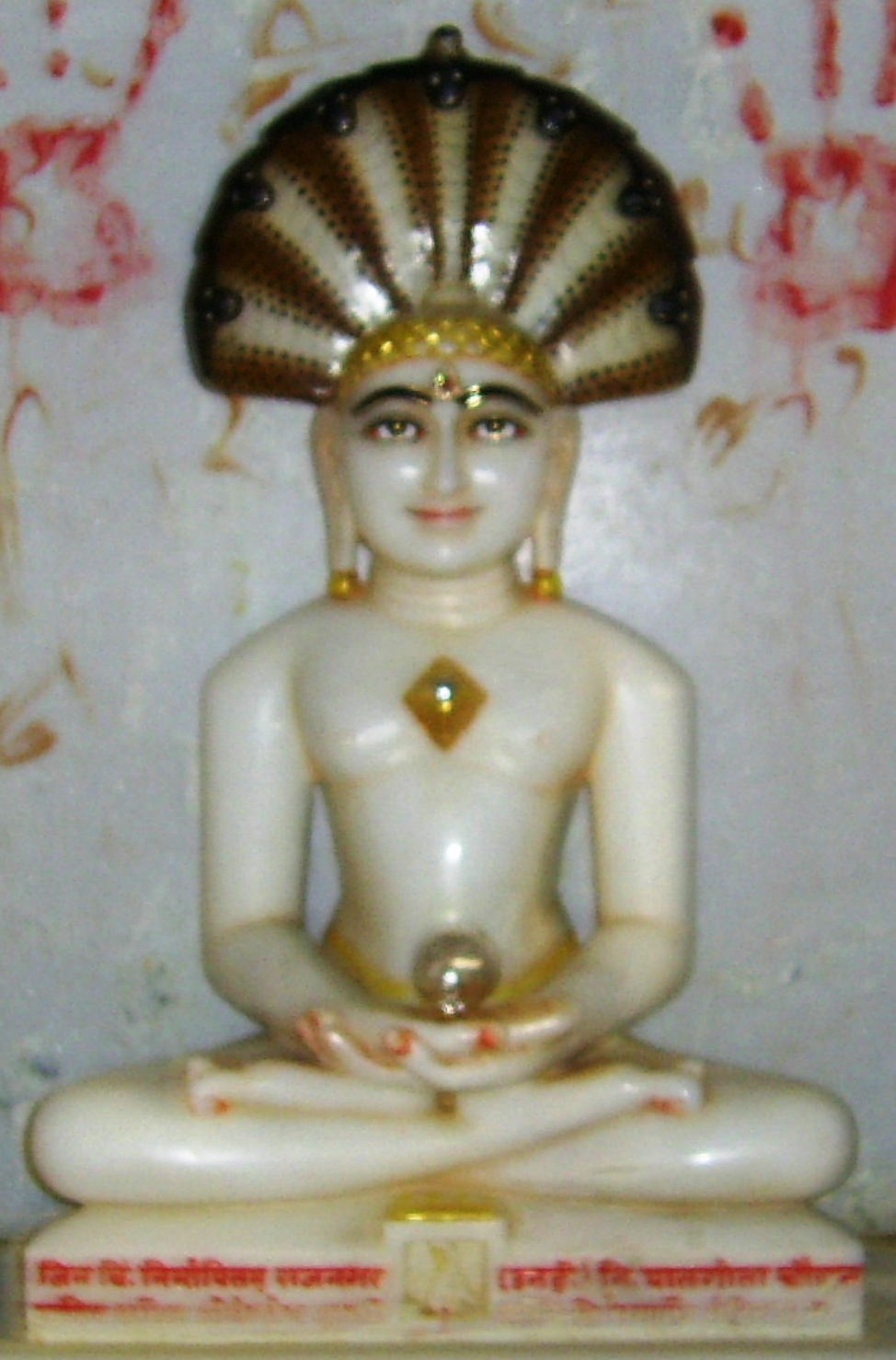
Shri Jiravala Parshvanath

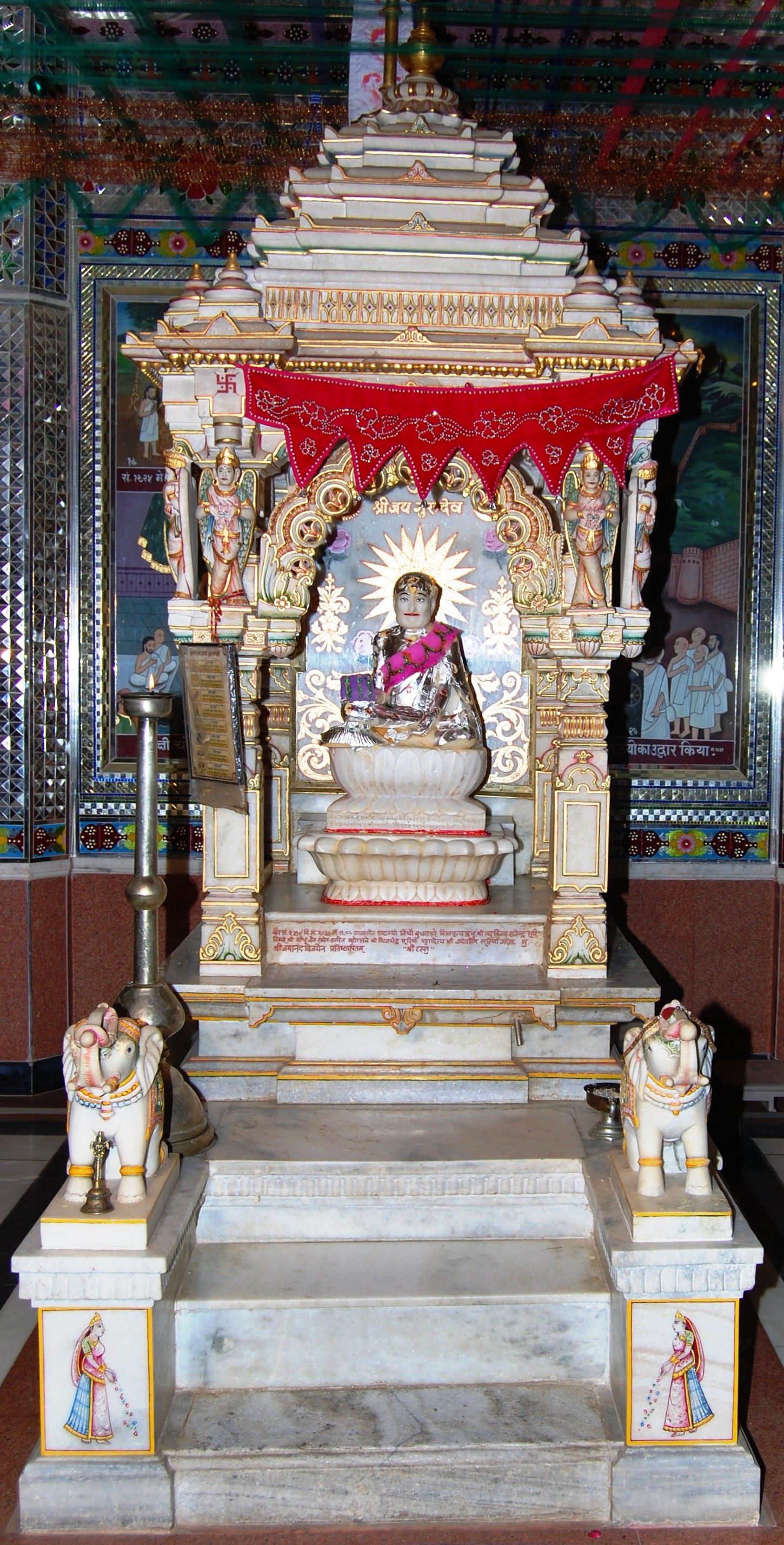
Shri Acharya Rajendrasuri Jain Guru Mandir

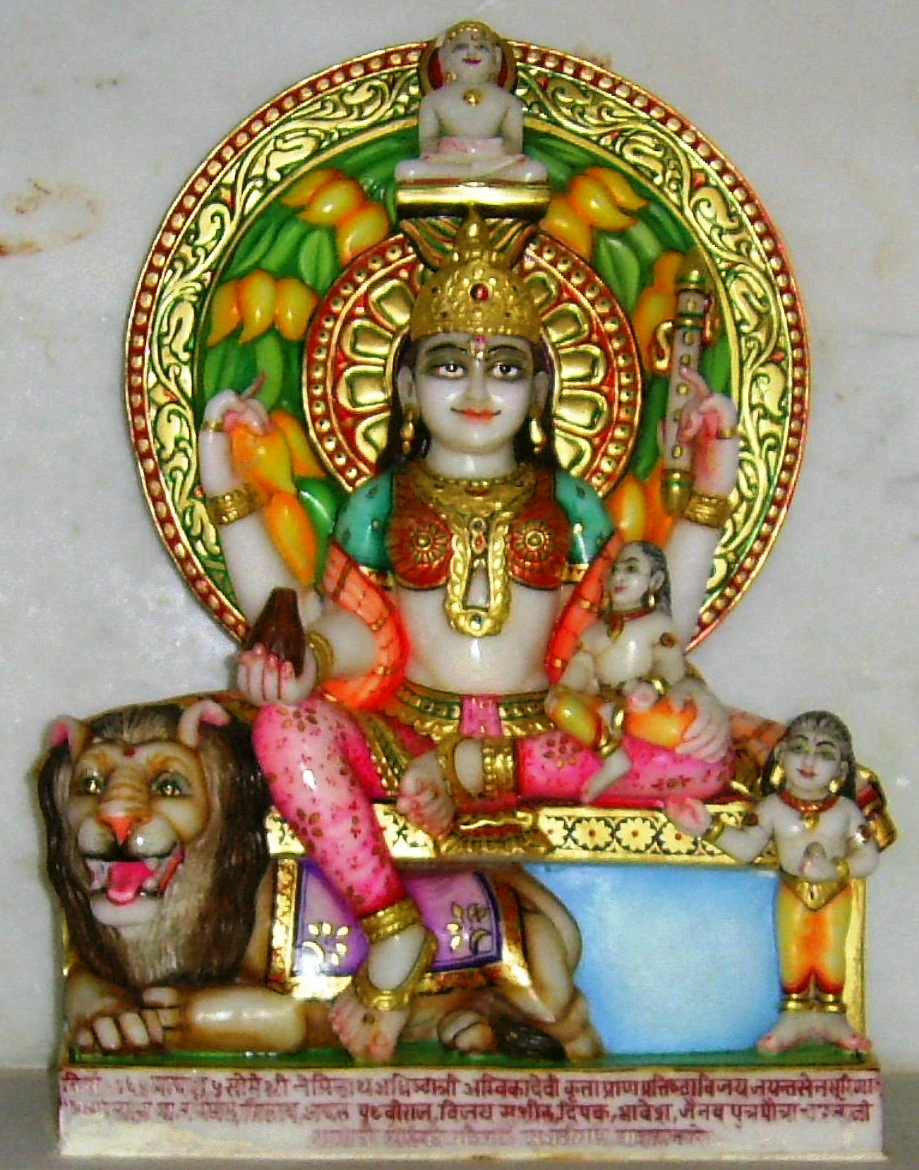
Shri Ambikadevi

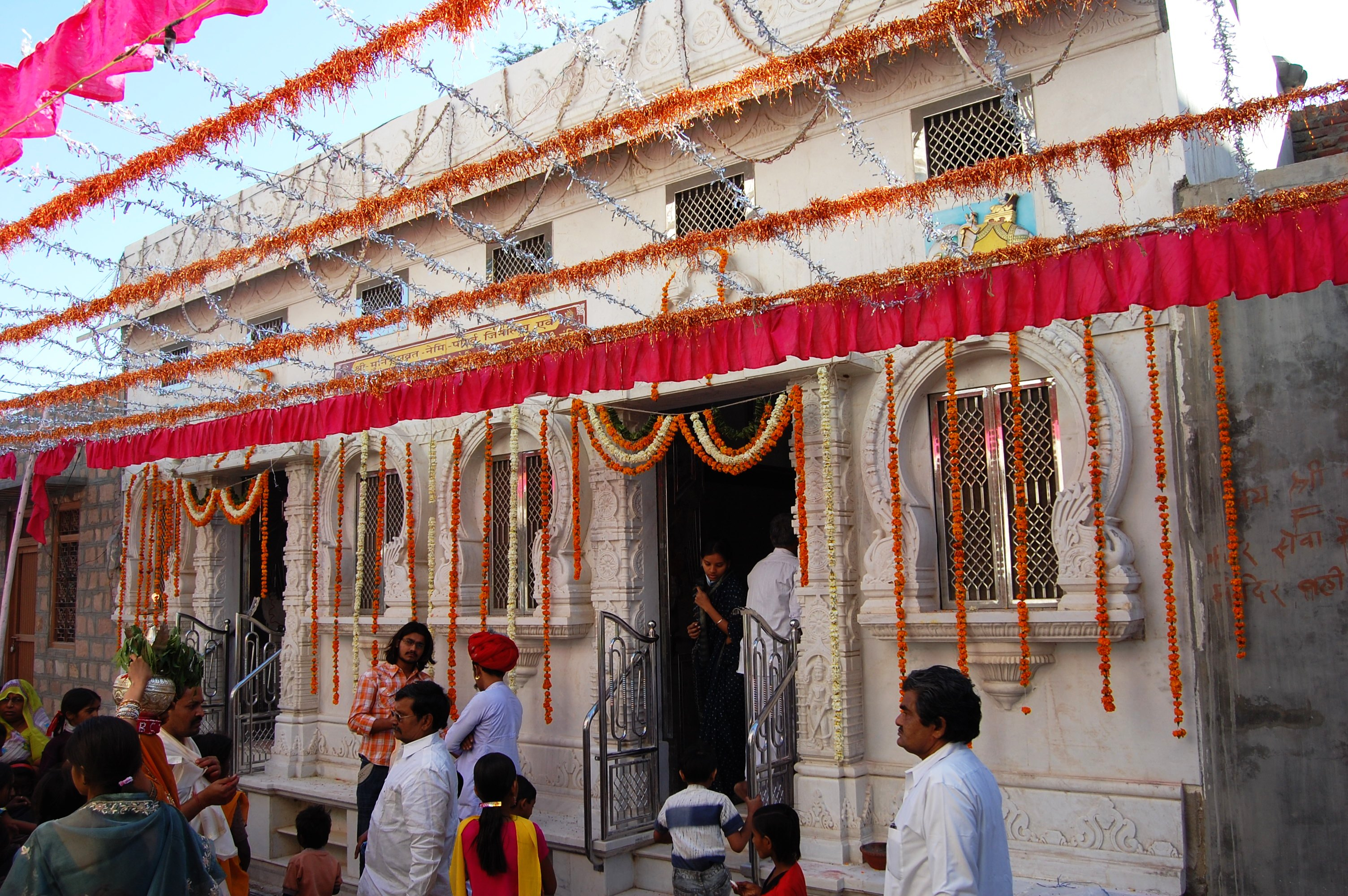
Shri Munisuvrata-Nemi-Parshva Jinalaya

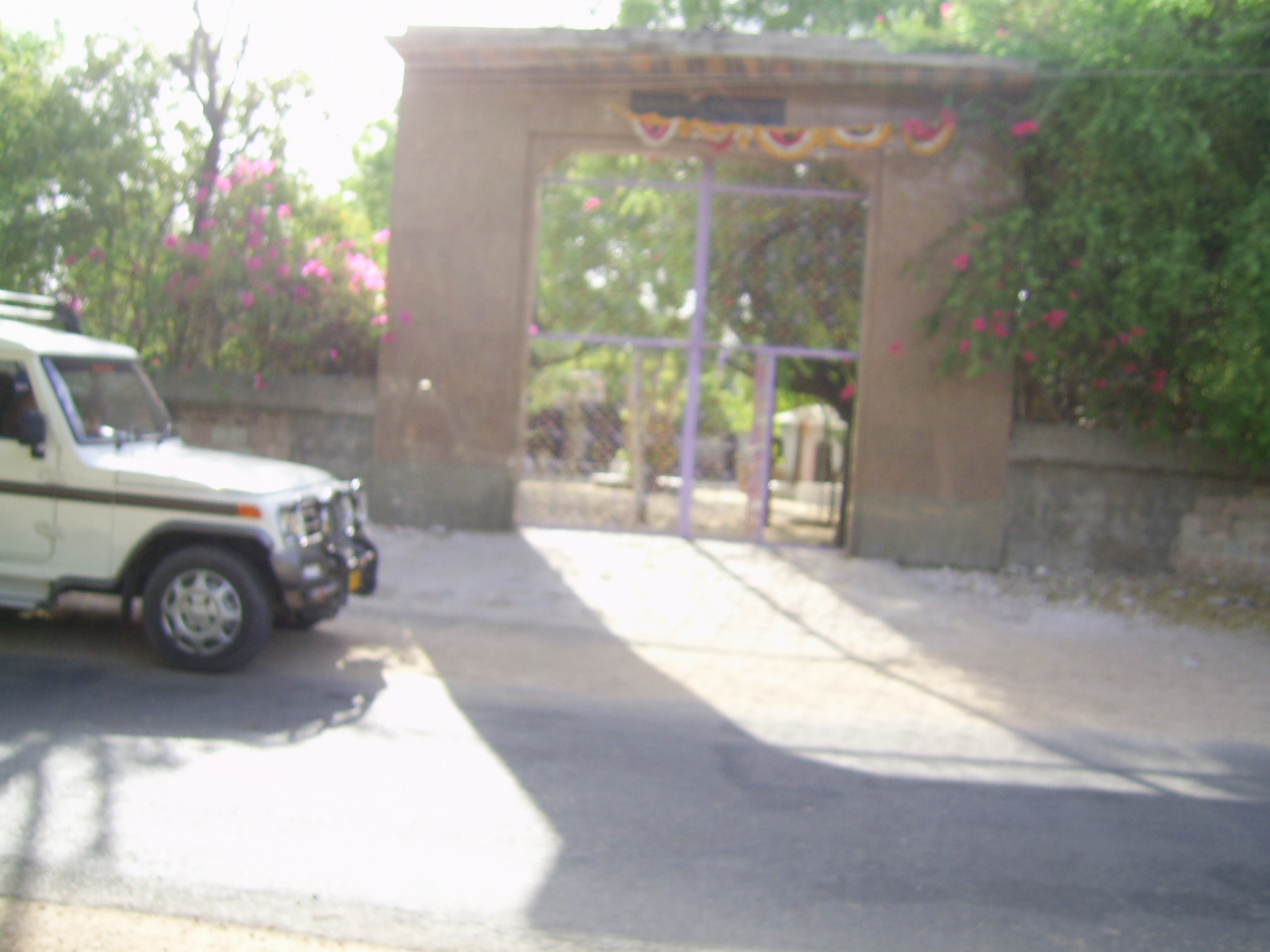
Shri Baba Ramdev Pir Temple

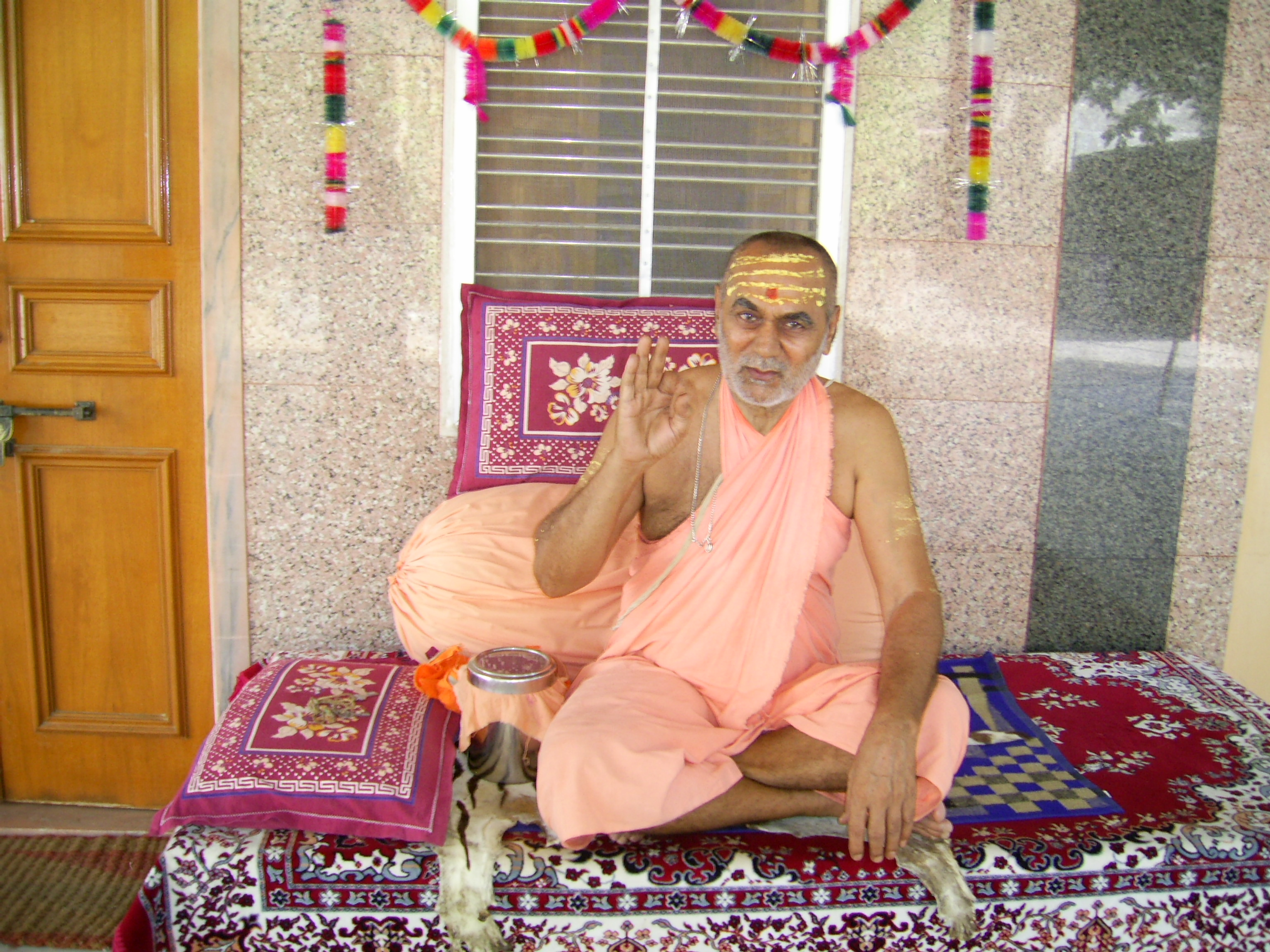
Shri Bal Brahmachari Shankar Swarupji Maharaj
