= Rajendrasuri =

Indian Śvetāmbara Jain monk (1827–1906)

Acharya Rajendrasuri
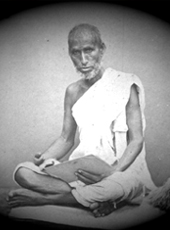
- Official name: Acharya Rajendrasuri

Personal life
- Born: Ratna Raj; 3 December 1827 Bharatpur, Rajasthan, India
- Died: 21 December 1906 (aged 80) Mohankheda, Dhar, Madhya Pradesh
- Parent(s): Rishabhadas Parakh, Keshardevi
- Notable work: Abhidhānarājaindrakōśa

Religious life
- Religion: Jainism
- Initiation: Rajendrasuri; Vaishakh Shukla 5 Vikram Samvat 1904 ( 1848 CE); Udaipur by Hemavijay

Acharya Rajendrasuri (3 December 1827 – 21 December 1906) was a Śvetāmbara Jain monk and reformer of monk traditions of the 19th century. He wrote many books on Jainism including अभिधान राजेंद्र कोष.

== Early life ==
Acharya Rajendrasuri was born to businessman Rishabhadas Parakh and Keshardevi. His birth name was Ratna Raj. He was born on 3 December 1827. He had 1 sister and 1 brother at Bharatpur, Rajasthan.

== Ascetic life ==
He was initiated as a Jain yati (a Jain monk who stays in the same place) by Hemavijay at Udaipur on Vaishakh Shukla 5 Vikram Samvat 1904 (in 1848 CE) and given a new name, Ratnavijay. He was the first yati initiated in the 19th century. Later his name was changed to Rajendrasuri upon his elevation to acharya rank.

He studied under Pramodsuri and Jain yati monk Sagarchand. Dharanendrasuri, impressed by his scholarship, appointed him as his daftari. Ratnavijay was disappointed with the luxurious life of Dharanendrasuri and left him in 1864 AD. Later he became the leader of Tapa Gaccha.

He led a movement in 1880 to reform yati tradition at Jaora, resulting in near extinction of it. He opposed the luxurious life of the Jain yatis, contradictory to Jain principles of non-possession and non-violence. He issued a nine-point manifesto known as Nav-kalama. He explained nine principles to reform Jain yati tradition. His manifesto was accepted after some initial opposition. Many leading yati and monks gave up their luxurious life and started following Jain principles. He established Agama or Samakit Gaccha, later known as Tristutik Gaccha.

He restored and reconstructed some Jain temples and consecrated 1023 icons of Tirthankaras. He visited Rajasthan and Malwa where he delivered religious discourses in Malwi, Marwari languages. He also opposed worship of other gods and goddesses over the worship of Tirthankars.

Rajendrasuri died on 21 December 1906 (Vikram Samvat 1963 Pous Shukla Saptami) at Mohankheda, Dhar, Madhya Pradesh. Later, Mohankheda became a centre for learning and a tirtha around 1940.

== Works ==
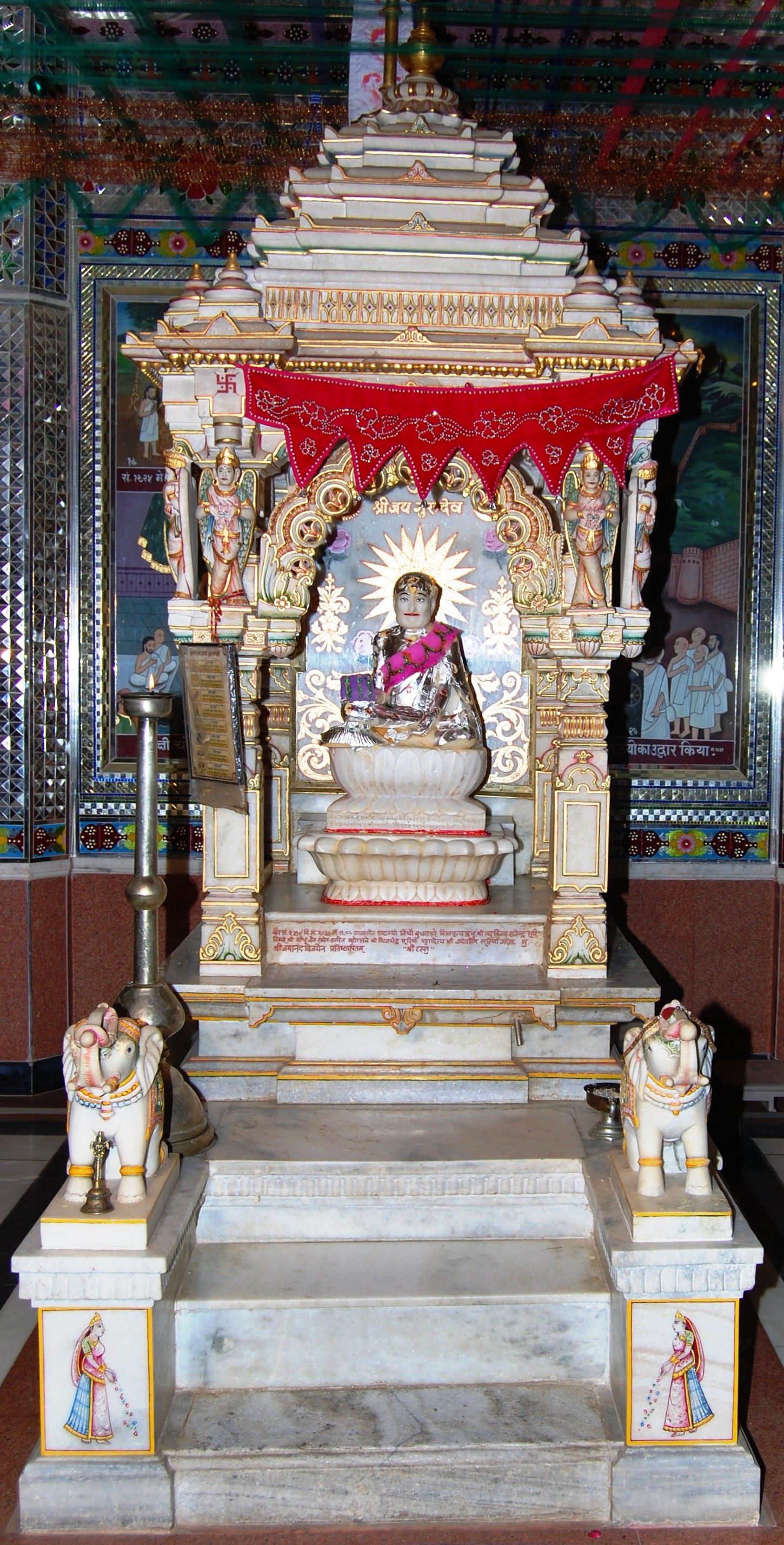
Shrine dedicated to Rajendrasuri at Santhu

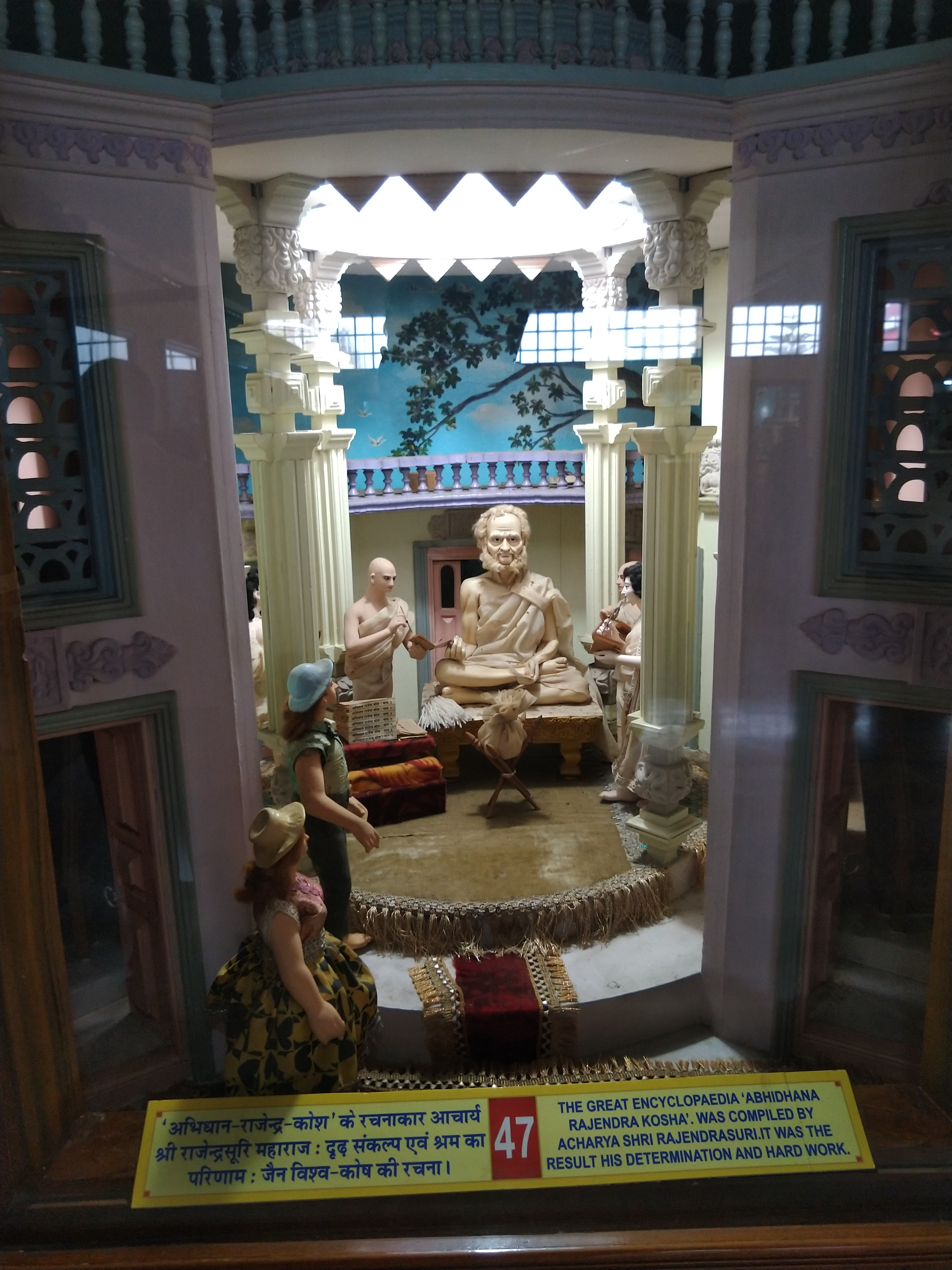
A diorama in Jain Museum of Madhuban depicting his compilation of Abhidhānarājaindrakōśa

Rajendrasuri wrote, collected and edited some Jain works. He compiled the Prakrit dictionary, Abhidhānarājaindrakōśa, in seven volumes with 9,200 pages describing 60,000 terms.

His works include:

1. Abhidhānarājaindrakōśa
2. Prakrit Vyakruti (Commentary on Grammar)
3. Kalpasutra Prabodhini (Commentary on the Kalpasutra)
4. Khartar Taskar Prabandh (Unpublished)
5. Bhagawati Sutra Sateek
6. Gachchhar Payanna
7. Terapanth Prashnottar Vichara
8. Mahanishitha Sutra (fifth)
9. Brahata sangrihani
10. Upasaka Dashanga Sutra
11. Prakrit Shabda Rupawali
12. Deepmalika Katha (Story of Diwali)
13. Holika Katha (Story of Holi)
14. Gandhara vad
15. Karma Vichar (Unpublished)
16. Tatva Vichar (Unpublished)
17. Kalpasutra Balavabodh
18. Jinupadesh Manjiri
19. Kalyanmandir Stotra (Commentary)
20. Jyotirya Kalpalata
21. Swarodhya-gyan and Yantravali
22. Vichar-sar Prakranam
23. Sanskrit Vyakarnam (Sanskrit grammar)
24. Laghu Sanghgrahani
25. Amarkosh (Original)
26. Navpad Puja Prasnothar
27. Upadhan Vidhi
28. Sratakatriyam (Bhatruhari)
29. Chandrika Vyakaranam
30. Kavyaprakash Mulamam
31. Varnamala
32. Upasaka Dashang Sutra
33. Ek Sou Aath bol
34. Upadesh Ratna saara
35. Treloyaka Deepika Yantravali
36. Karna Granth (four)
37. Saptati Shatasthan Yantravali
38. Dwashisth Margana Yantravali
39. Shada Dravya Vichara
40. Siddhanta Prakash
41. Asthanhika Vyakhyana
42. Sindura Prakara-satika
43. Bhayhara Stotra

The original copy of these books are stored in libraries of Ahor, Rajasthan; Jaora; Mohankheda, Madhya Pradesh; Tharad and Ahmedabad in Gujarat.

== Recognition ==
Shrines dedicated to him were erected at several places in India including Mohankheda, Bhinmal, Dhanera, Jalore, Bangalore, Bijapur, Ahemdabad, Tharad, Bharatpur, Indore, Ratlam, and Santhu, Kachrod, Rajendra Nagar, Devispeta(Nellore District)etc. His death centenary was celebrated in 2006 at Mohankheda.
