= Tirtha (Jainism) =

Sanskrit term denoting Jain pilgrimage sites

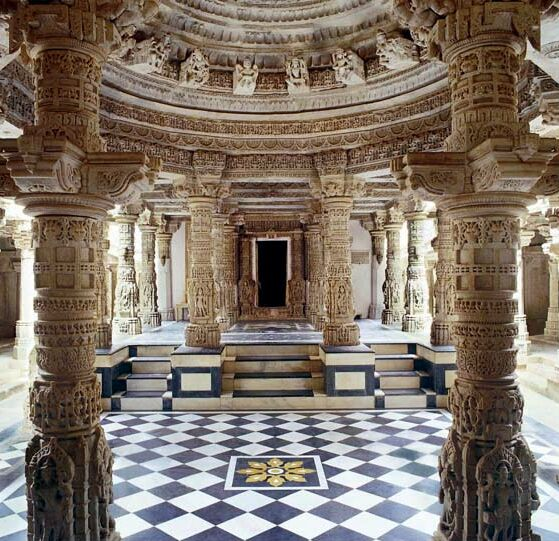
Vimal Vasahi Adishwar Temple, one of the Dilwara Temples, Mount Abu

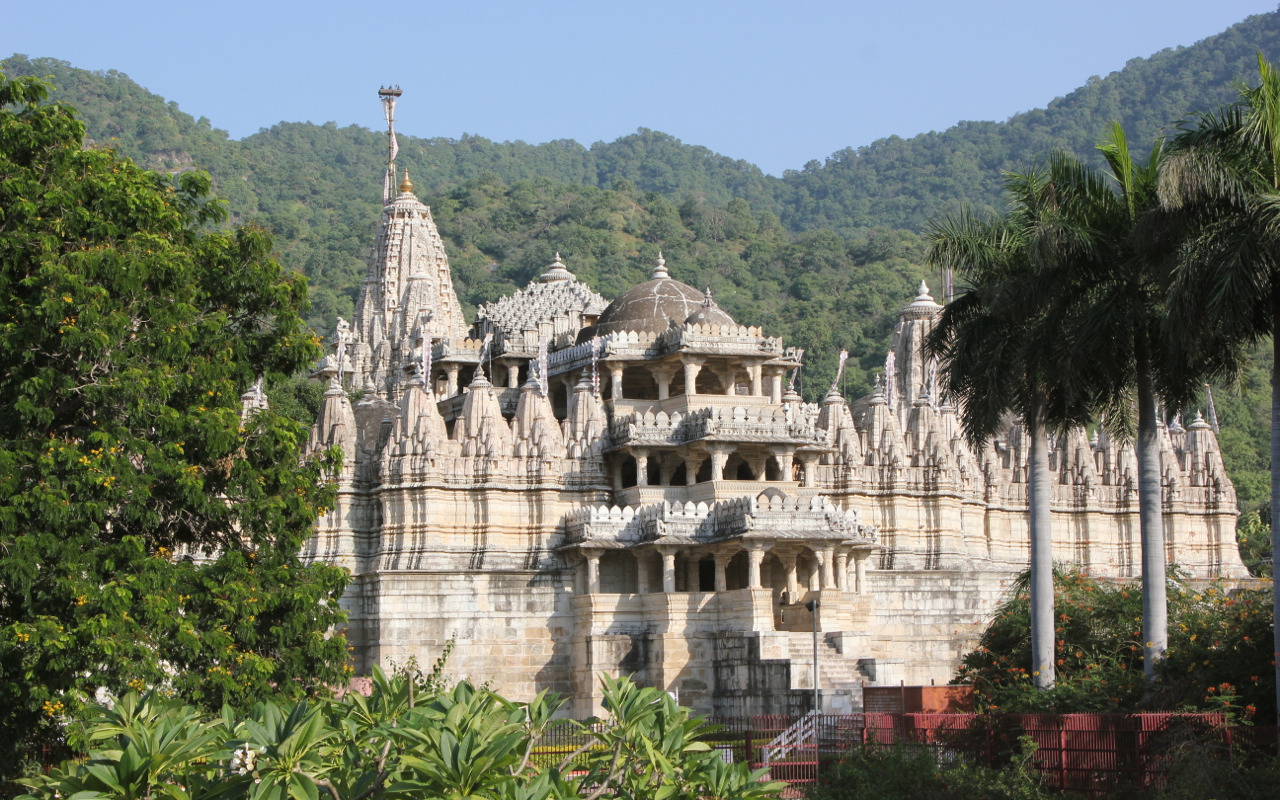
Chaumukha Temple, Ranakpur

In Jainism, a tīrtha (Sanskrit: तीर्थ "ford, a shallow part of a body of water that may be easily crossed") is a passage across samsara first blazed by a Tirthankara. The word is used to refer to Jain pilgrimage sites, and to the four sections of the sangha. A tirtha provides the inspiration to enable one to cross over from worldly engagement to the side of moksha.

Jain tirthas are located throughout India. Often a tirtha has a number of temples as well as residences (dharmashala) for the pilgrims and wandering monks and scholars.

== Etymology and definition ==
The term tīrtha (Sanskrit: तीर्थ) is derived from the verbal root tṛ, meaning "to cross over". In the context of Jainism, it refers to a "ford" or a "crossing place" that enables the soul to cross the ocean of Saṃsāra (the cycle of birth, death, and rebirth) and attain Moksha (liberation).

=== Doctrinal meanings ===
In Jain doctrine, the term tīrtha has a dual application, referring both to the religious community and to sacred geography.

1. The Community (Saṅgha): In its primary canonical sense, a tīrtha refers to the four-fold religious order (Chaturvidha Saṅgha) established by a tirthankara. This community consists of four categories of devotees:

- Sādhu (Monks)
- Sādhvī (Nuns)
- Śrāvaka (Laymen)
- Śrāvikā (Laywomen)

According to Jain philosophy, the establishment of this social order creates the metaphorical "ford" through which followers can cross the cycle of rebirth.

2. The physical place (Kṣetra): In common usage, tīrtha refers to specific physical locations—temples, mountains, or cities—that are sanctified by their association with the tirthankaras or other enlightened ascetics. These sites are viewed as energetic focal points that facilitate spiritual progress.

=== Distinction from other traditions ===
Scholars note a distinct theological difference between the Jain concept of tīrtha and that found in other Indian traditions, particularly Hinduism. According to sociologist Vilas Sangave, while the Hindu concept of tirtha often involves visiting sacred rivers or locations to "dispel demerit" or wash away sins, Jain theology rejects the notion that physical objects or rivers can cleanse moral impurities.

Instead, a Jain tīrtha is defined strictly by its soteriological function. It is intended to serve as a site for Ātma-jāgṛti (self-awakening or self-enlightenment). The physical site acts as a catalyst for the pilgrim, inspiring them to cultivate the virtues of the tirthankaras and to engage in austerity (tapas) and meditation, which ultimately leads to the shedding of karma (nirjarā).

== Theology of pilgrimage (yātrā) ==
In Jain theology, the act of pilgrimage (yātrā) is not merely a devotional journey but a structured religious activity with specific soteriological (salvation-oriented) goals. Scholars identify two distinct but overlapping motivations for undertaking a pilgrimage: the ascetic goal of shedding karma (nirjarā) and the lay goal of acquiring merit (puṇya).

== Types ==
Tirtha sites include:

- Siddhakshetras or site of moksha liberation of an arihant (kevalin) or Tirthankaras like Ashtapada Hill, Shikharji, Girnar, Pawapuri, Palitana, Mangi-Tungi and Champapuri (capital of Anga)
- Atishayakshetras where divine events have occurred like Mahavirji, Rishabhdeo, Kundalpur, Aharji etc.
- Puranakshetras associated with lives of great men like Ayodhya, Vidisha, Hastinapur, and Rajgir
- Gyanakshetra: associated with famous acharyas or centers of learning like Mohankheda, Shravanabelagola and Ladnu

== Locations ==
Geographically, the tirthas are divided into six quarters:

- North India: Hastinapur
- South India: Kulpakji, Shravanabelagola, Sankighatta, Moodabidri, Humbaj, Anantnath Swami Temple, Gummileru
- Eastern India: Shikharji, Pawapuri, Champapuri, Pundravardhana
- Western India: Palitana, Girnar, Mount Abu, Mahavirji, Shankheshwar, Mahudi
- Central India: Vidisha, Kundalpur, Sonagiri, Muktagiri, Bawangaja
- Overseas: Taxila, Ashtapada, Siddhachalam, Nava Ashtapada, Siddhayatan, Jain Center of Southern California

Pilgrimage sites are owned either by the Digambara sect or the Śvetāmbara sect. Some of the major Śvetāmbara pilgrimage sites include: -

- Palitana temples
- Shankheshwar Jain Temple
- Girnar Jain temples
- Sammed Shikharji Jain Tirth (shared with Digambar)
- Lachhuar Jain temple
- Dilwara Temples
- Nakoda Jain Temple
- Ranakpur Jain temple
- Kesariya Jain Tirth (shared with Digambar)
- Kulpak Jain Temple
- Mohankheda
- Mahudi Jain Temple

== See also ==
- Jain temple
- Tirtha (Hinduism)
- Vividha Tirtha Kalpa
