= Gunasena =

8th/9th-century CE Indian Jain monk

Acharya Gunasena
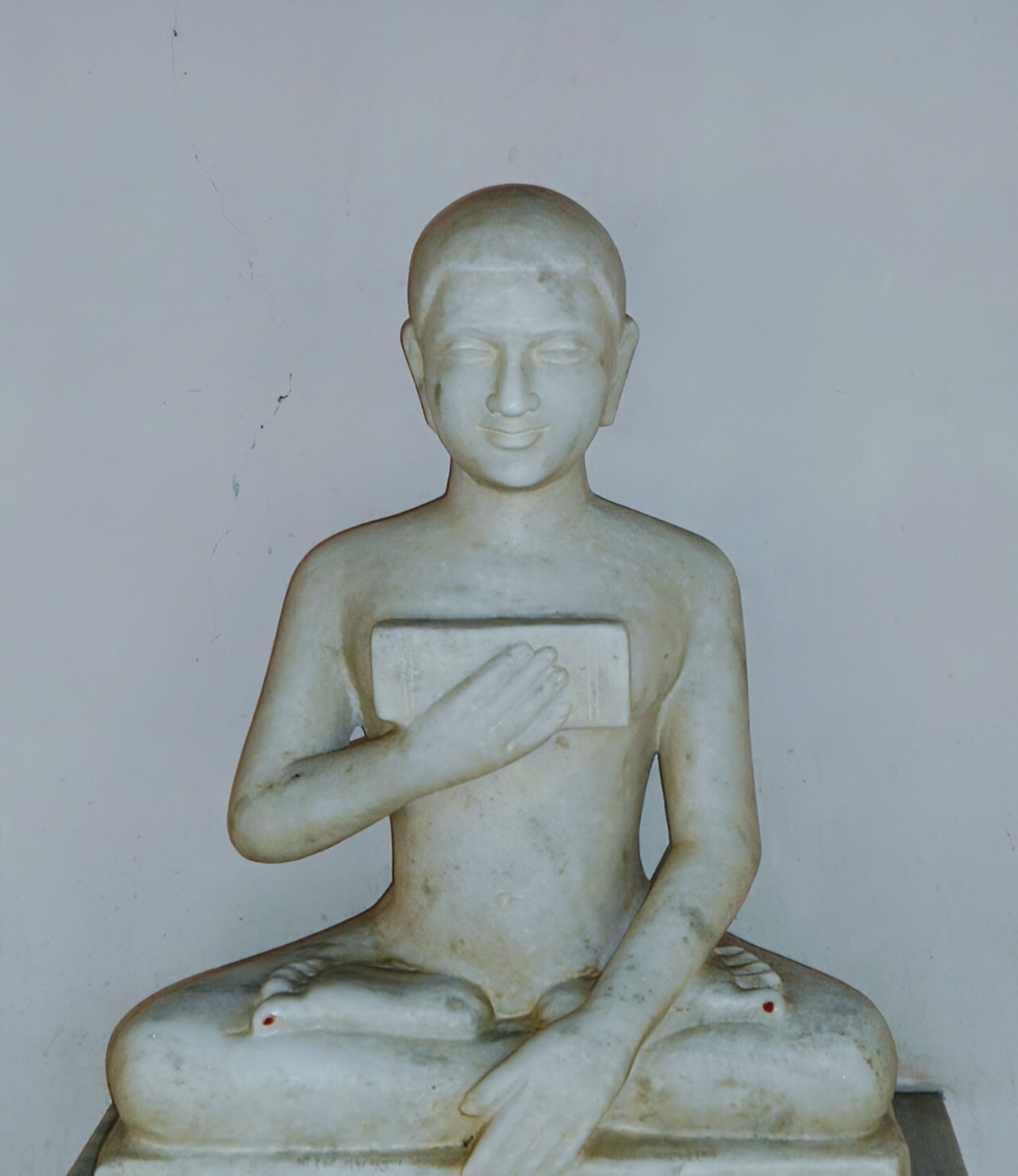
- Gunasena (Jinasena II)

Personal life
- Born: 850
- Died: 900
- Era: 9th century CE
- Notable work: "Dhavala" (co-authored)

Religious life
- Religion: Jainism
- Sect: Digambar

Religious career
- Teacher: Jinasena
- Predecessor: Acharya Jinasena
- Successor: Gunabhadra
- Disciples: Gunabhadra, Krishna II

Acharya Gunasena, known more commonly in modern scholarship as ', was a 9th-century CE Digambara Jain monk, scholar, and spiritual leader. He was a Senior disciple of Acharya Jinasena and is renowned for completing major Jain commentarial and narrative works. He served as the spiritual guide (rajaguru) to Krishna II (Akalavarsha), of the Rashtrakuta Empire.

== Life and background ==
Gunaseṇa belonged to the Digambara tradition of Jainism and lived during the Rashtrakuta period in southern India. He was A senior disciple of renowned scholar Acharya Jinasena. and is mentioned in Kannada ("Prashasti" by Lokasena), as the teacher of Gunabhadra, Along with Acharya Jinasena

Gunaseṇa was the royal spiritual preceptor (rajaguru) of Rashtrakuta king Krishna II, one of the greatest patrons of Jainism in Indian history. He later continued in this capacity under Krishna II, Amoghavarsha's successor. Under their patronage, Jain philosophy, literature, and temple architecture experienced significant growth.

== Works ==
=== Dhavala commentary ===
Gunaseṇa completed the extensive commentary on the Shatkhandagama, one of the earliest and most sacred Digambara Jain texts. The commentary, known as the Dhavala and Mahādhavala, was initiated by Acharya Virasena. These texts provide systematic discussions of Jain karma theory, the classifications of the soul (jīva), and the metaphysical framework of Jain cosmology.

== Legacy ==
Gunaseṇa is regarded as an important figure in the Digambara tradition for his philosophical and literary contributions. He is credited with completing the Dhavala commentary, a work that established his role in the transmission of Jain doctrinal thought. His disciple Guṇabhadra later completed the Uttarapurana, together with which the Ādi purāṇa forms the Mahapurana.

As the guru to two successive Rashtrakuta rulers, his influence extended beyond religious circles into political and cultural spheres.

== See also ==
- Acharya Jinasena
- Shatkhandagama
- Gunabhadra
- Amoghavarsha I
- Krishna II
- Jainism in Karnataka

== Bibliography ==
- Jaini, Padmanabh S. (1979). The Jaina Path of Purification. Berkeley: University of California Press. ISBN 9780520034945. OCLC 4779344.
- Cort, John E. (2010). Framing the Jina: Narratives of Icons and Idols in Jain History. New York: Oxford University Press. ISBN 9780195385021. OCLC 316835730.
- Dundas, Paul (2002). The Jains (2nd ed.). London: Routledge. ISBN 0-203-39827-0. OCLC 252916273.
- Upadhye, A. N. (1965). "Jinasena and his Literary Contributions". Jaina Sahitya aur Itihasa. Mysore: Mysore University Publications. OCLC 3115715.
- Nagarajaiah, Hampa (1999). Jainism in Southern Karnataka. Bangalore: Sapna Book House. OCLC 45166444.
