= Uttarapurana =

9th-century Jain text by Acharya Gunabhadra

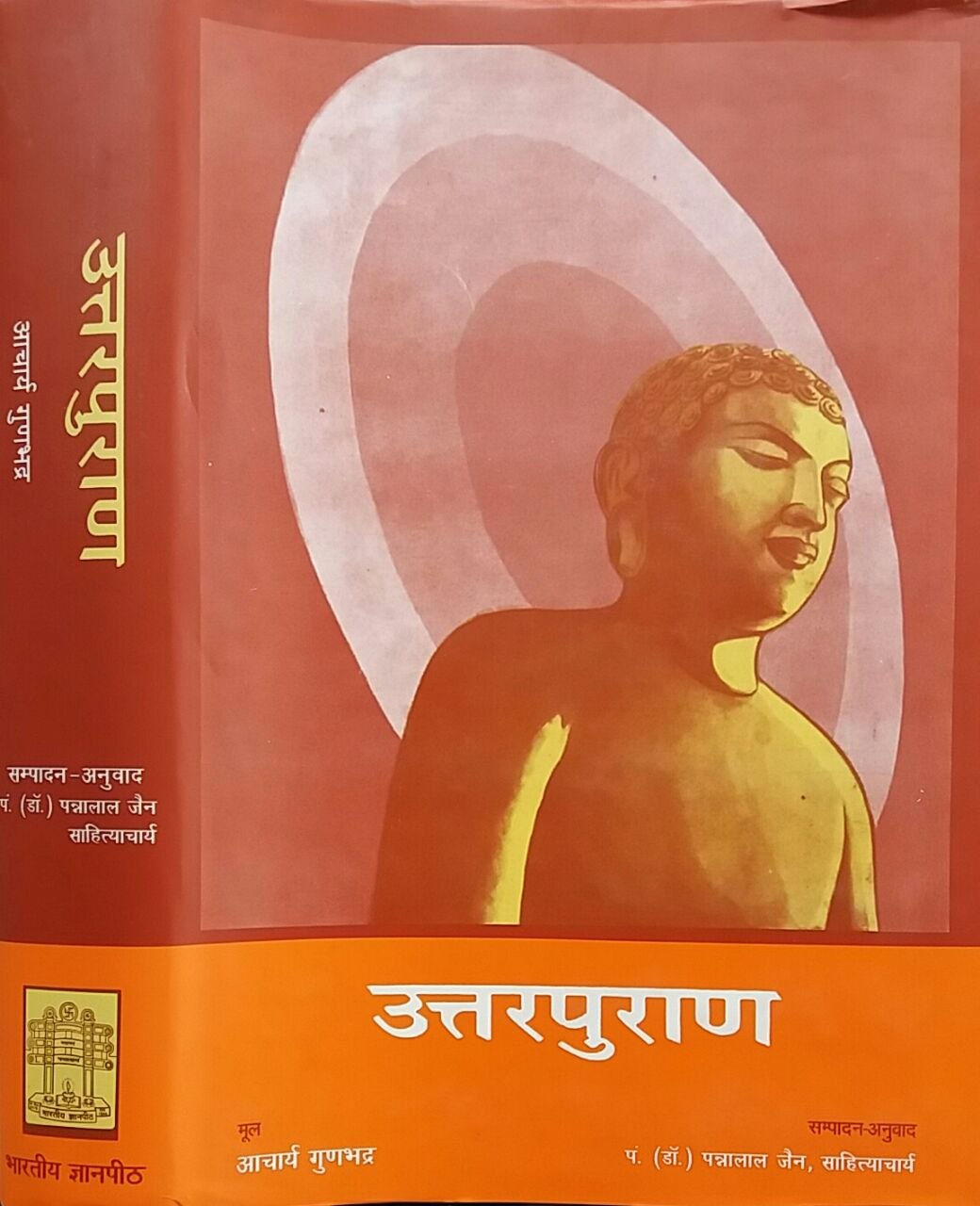
- Uttarapurana 9th-century Jain text by Acharya Gunabhadra
- Author: Gunabhadra and Jinasena
- Original title: उत्तरपुराण
- Language: Sanskrit
- Series: Mahapurana (Jainism)
- Subject: Jainism
- Genre: Epic poetry
- Published: 9th–10th century CE
- Publication place: India
- Preceded by: Adipurana

The Uttarapurana (Sanskrit: उत्तरपुराण) is a major Jain text composed in Sanskrit, forming the second part of the larger Mahapurana (Jainism) in the Digambar tradition. It was begun by Acharya Jinasena and completed by his disciple Acharya Gunabhadra in the 9th–10th century CE.

== Content ==
The Uttarapurana narrates the lives of the last 23 of the 24 Jain Tirthankaras, beginning with Ajitanatha (2nd Tirthankara) and concluding with Mahavira (24th Tirthankara). Each Tirthankara’s life is presented as an ideal model of spiritual progress, emphasizing the Jain principles of renunciation, non-violence, and liberation.

The text continues the narrative framework established in Jinasena’s Adipurana, which was dedicated to Rishabhanatha, the first Tirthankara. While Adipurana focused on cosmology and early Jain figures, the Uttarapurana completes the mytho-historical cycle.

== Authorship ==
The Uttarapurana was started by Acharya Jinasena but left incomplete at the time of his death. It was completed by his disciple Acharya Gunabhadra, who was also a student of Acharya Gunasena.

Together, the Adipurana and Uttarapurana are collectively referred to as the Mahapurana (Jainism), one of the most revered narrative texts in Jain literature.

== Influence ==
The Uttarapurana had a significant impact on later Jain literary and philosophical works. Its poetic form and devotional tone inspired many subsequent writers in Sanskrit, Kannada, and other Indian languages. It also played a role in spreading Jain values among the royal courts and lay communities of South India during the Rashtrakuta period.

== See also ==
- Adipurana
- Digambara
- Gunabhadra
- Jinasena
- Mahapurana (Jainism)
