= Digambara =

One of the two major schools of Jainism

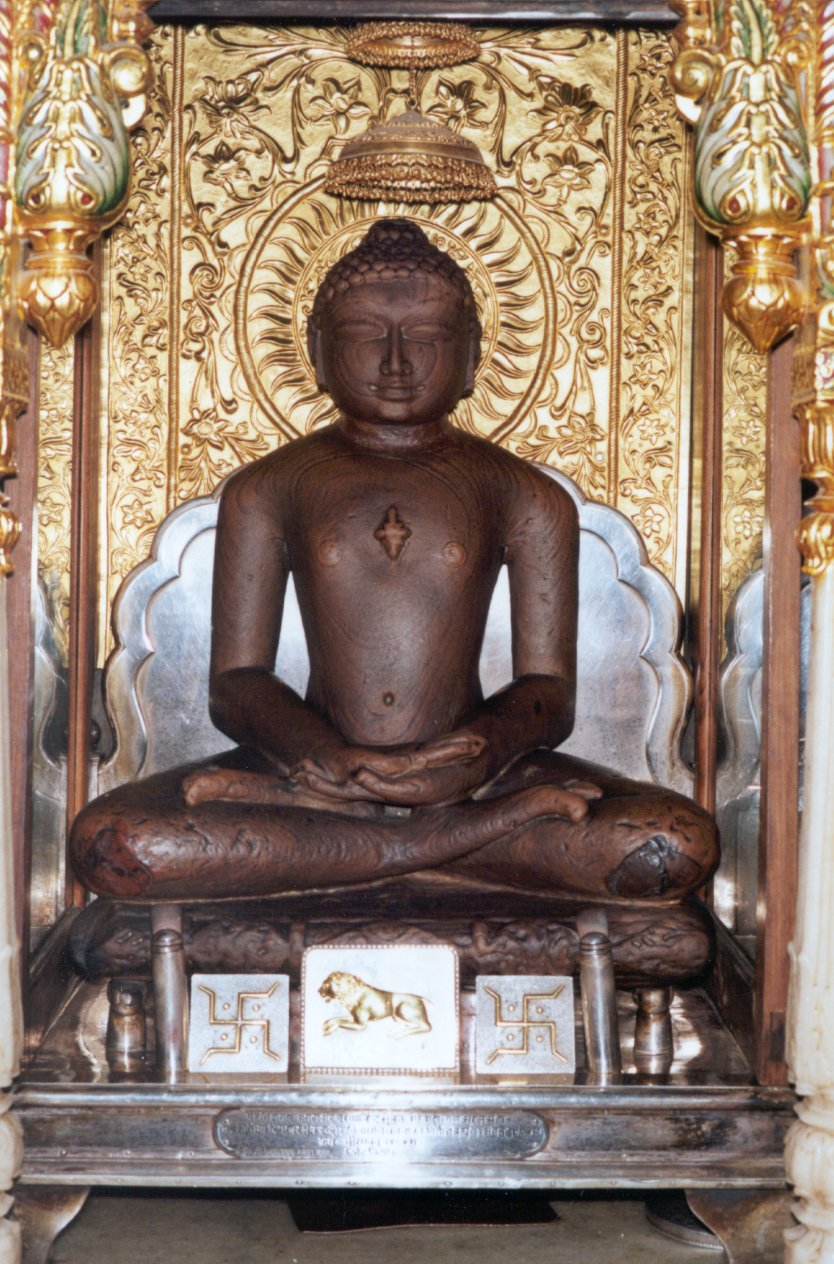
Idol of Mahavira at Shri Mahavir Ji Temple, depicting Digambara iconography

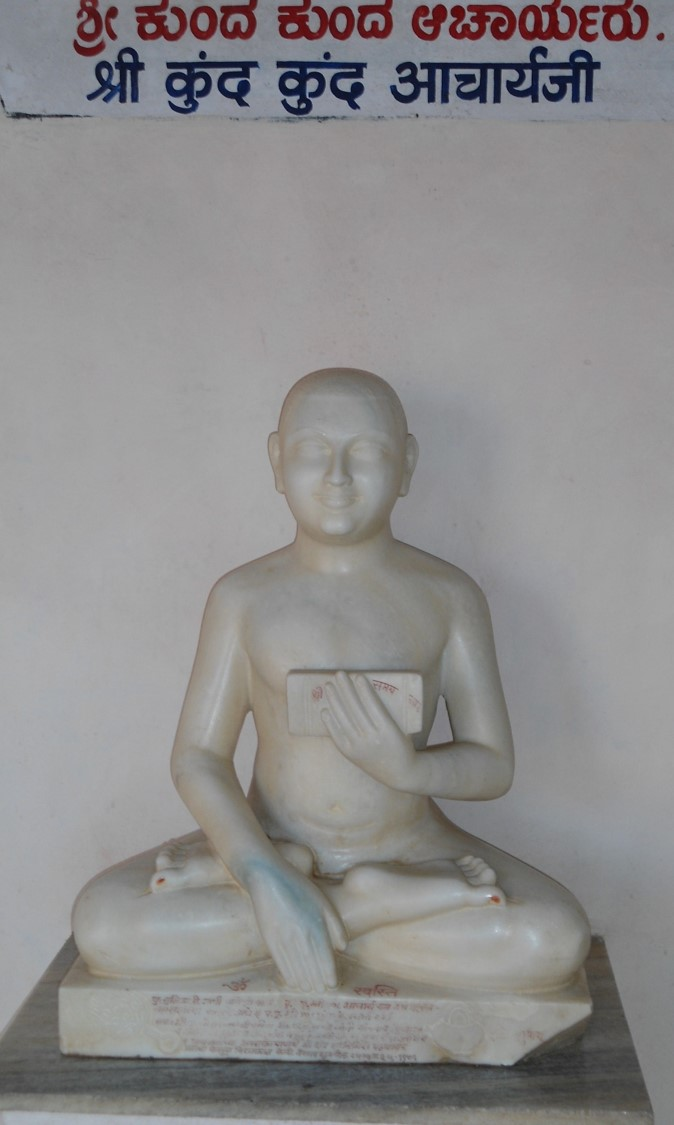
Image depicting Acharya Kundakunda

Digambara (Sanskrit: दिगम्बरः, /dɪˈɡʌmbərə/; "sky-clad") is one of the two major schools of Jainism, the other being Śvetāmbara (white-clad). The Sanskrit word Digambara means "sky-clad", referring to their traditional monastic practice of neither possessing nor wearing any clothes. Mahavira emphasised the importance of nakedness for monks, teaching that it symbolised complete detachment and was an ideal form of conduct. Mahavira believed that renouncing clothes made the body immune to external influences like heat and cold, increasing resilience. Without clothes, a monk would avoid the distractions of acquiring, maintaining, and washing garments, allowing him to focus on spiritual growth and self-discipline.

Digambara and Śvetāmbara traditions have had historical differences ranging from their dress code, their temples and iconography, attitude towards female monastics, their legends, and the texts they consider as important. Digambaras maintain that women cannot attain nirvana. However, Śvetāmbaras differ and maintain that women as well as eunuchs can attain nirvana, having more inclusivity.

Digambara monks believe in the virtue of non-attachment and non-possession of any material goods. Monks carry a community-owned picchi, which is a broom made of fallen peacock feathers for removing and thus saving the life of insects in their path or before they sit.

The Digambara literature can be traced only to the first millennium, with its oldest surviving sacred text being the mid-second century Ṣaṭkhaṅḍāgama ("Scripture in Six Parts") of Dharasena (the Moodabidri manuscripts). One of the most important scholar-monks of the Digambara tradition was Kundakunda.

Digambara Jain communities are currently found in most parts of India like Rajasthan, Uttar Pradesh, Delhi, Bihar, Jharkhand, Madhya Pradesh, Maharashtra, Karnataka and Tamil Nadu.

== Nomenclature ==
According to Heinrich Zimmer, the word Digambara is a combination of two Sanskrit words: dik (दिक्) (space, sky) and ambara (अम्बर) (garment), referring to those whose garments are of the element that fills the four quarters of space.

== Core philosophy ==
=== Aparigraha – non-attachment ===
One of the main principle in Jainism is aparigraha which means non-attachment to worldly possessions. For monks and nuns, Jainism requires a vow of complete non-possession of any property, relations and emotions. The ascetic is a wandering mendicant in the Digambara tradition, or a resident mendicant in the Śvētāmbara tradition. For Jain laypersons, it recommends limited possession of property that has been honestly earned, and giving excess property to charity. According to Natubhai Shah, aparigraha applies to both the material and the psychic. Material possessions refer to various forms of property. Psychic possessions refer to emotions, likes and dislikes, and attachments of any form. Unchecked attachment to possessions is said to result in direct harm to one's personality.

=== Ahimsa – non-violence ===
The principle of ahimsa (non-violence or non-injury) is a fundamental tenet of Jainism. It holds that one must abandon all violent activity and that without such a commitment to non-violence all religious behavior is worthless. In Jain theology, it does not matter how correct or defensible the violence may be, one must not kill or harm any being, and non-violence is the highest religious duty. Jain texts such as Ācārāṅga Sūtra and Tattvarthasūtra state that one must renounce all killing of living beings, whether tiny or large, movable or immovable. Its theology teaches that one must neither kill another living being, nor cause another to kill, nor consent to any killing directly or indirectly.

Furthermore, Jainism emphasizes non-violence against all beings not only in action but also in speech and in thought. It states that instead of hate or violence against anyone, "all living creatures must help each other". (Note: This view, however, is not shared by all Jain sub-traditions. For example, the Terapanthi Jain tradition, with about 250,000 followers, considers both good karma such as compassionate charity, and bad karma such as sin, as binding one's soul to worldly morality. It states that any karma leads to a negation of the "absolute non-violence" principle, given man's limited perspective. It recommends that the monk or nun seeking salvation must avoid hurting or helping any being in any form.)

Jains believe that violence negatively affects and destroys one's soul, particularly when the violence is done with intent, hate or carelessness, or when one indirectly causes or consents to the killing of a human or non-human living being.

The doctrine exists in Hinduism and Buddhism, but is most highly developed in Jainism. The theological basis of non-violence as the highest religious duty has been interpreted by some Jain scholars not to "be driven by merit from giving or compassion to other creatures, nor a duty to rescue all creatures", but resulting from "continual self-discipline", a cleansing of the soul that leads to one's own spiritual development which ultimately affects one's salvation and release from rebirths. Jains believe that causing injury to any being in any form creates bad karma which affects one's rebirth, future well-being and causes suffering.

Late medieval Jain scholars re-examined the Ahiṃsā doctrine when faced with external threat or violence. For example, they justified violence by monks to protect nuns. According to Dundas, the Jain scholar Jinadattasuri wrote during a time of destruction of temples and persecution that "anybody engaged in a religious activity who was forced to fight and kill somebody would not lose any spiritual merit but instead attain deliverance".

However, examples in Jain texts that condone fighting and killing under certain circumstances are relatively rare. (Note: Jain literature, like Buddhist and Hindu literature, has also debated the aspects of violence and non-violence in food creation.)

=== Anekāntavāda – many-sided reality ===
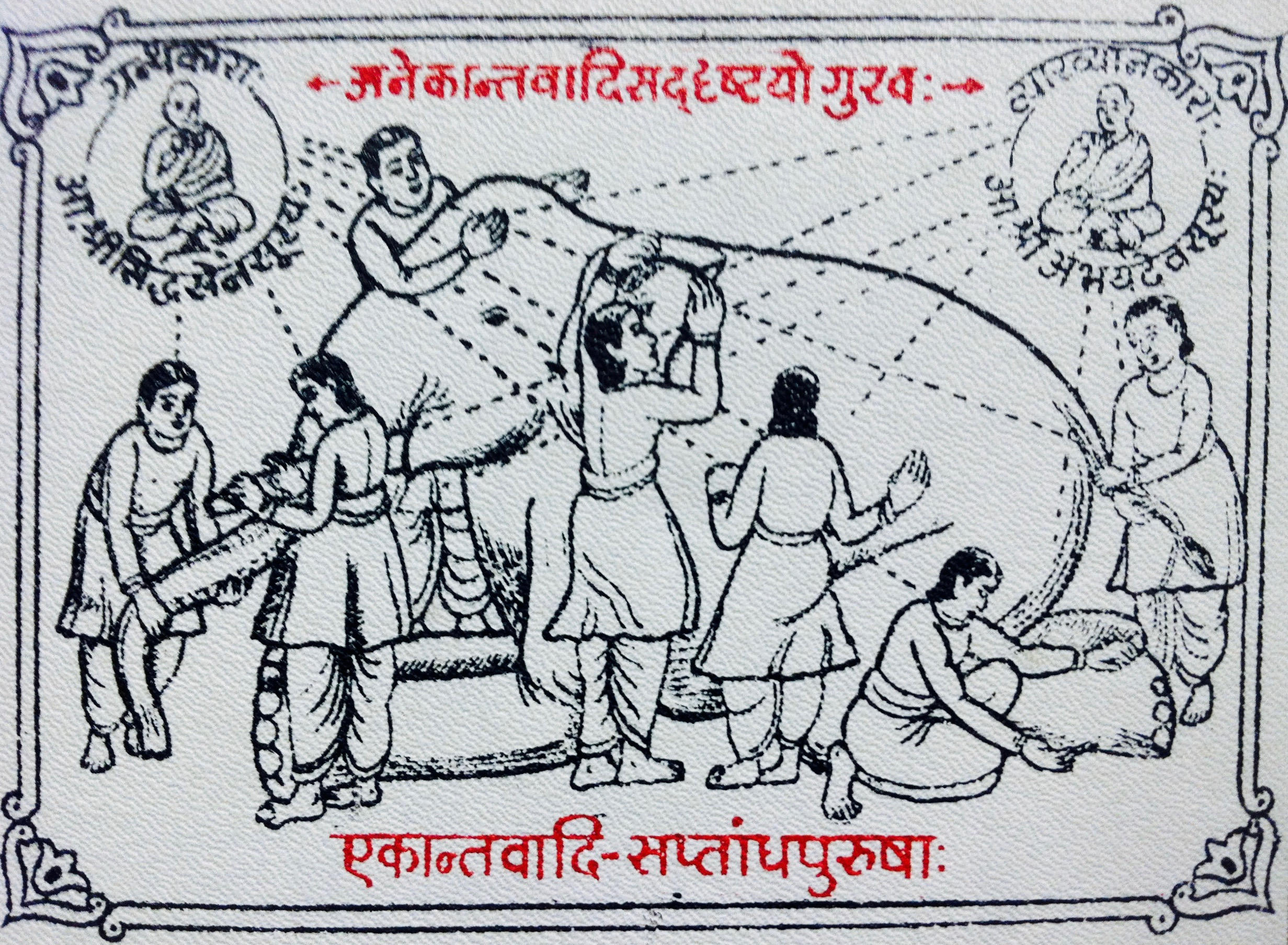
Jain temple painting explaining Anekantavada with Blind men and an elephant

The second main principle of Jainism is anekāntavāda, from anekānta ("many-sidedness," etymologically "non-oneness" or "not being one") and vada ("doctrine"). The doctrine states that truth and reality are complex and always have multiple aspects. It further states that reality can be experienced, but cannot be fully expressed with language. It suggests that human attempts to communicate are Naya, "partial expression of the truth". According to it, one can experience the taste of truth, but cannot fully express that taste through language. It holds that attempts to express experience are syāt, or valid "in some respect", but remain "perhaps, just one perspective, incomplete". It concludes that in the same way, spiritual truths can be experienced but not fully expressed. It suggests that the great error is belief in ekānta (one-sidedness), where some relative truth is treated as absolute. The doctrine is ancient, found in Buddhist texts such as the Samaññaphala Sutta. The Jain Agamas suggest that Mahāvīra's approach to answering all metaphysical philosophical questions was a "qualified yes" (syāt). These texts identify anekāntavāda as a key difference from the Buddha's teachings. The Buddha taught the Middle Way, rejecting extremes of the answer "it is" or "it is not" to metaphysical questions. The Mahāvīra, in contrast, taught his followers to accept both "it is", and "it is not", qualified with "perhaps", to understand Absolute Reality. The permanent being is conceptualized as jiva (soul) and ajiva (matter) within a dualistic anekāntavāda framework.

According to Paul Dundas, in contemporary times the anekāntavāda doctrine has been interpreted by some Jains as intending to "promote a universal religious tolerance", and a teaching of "plurality" and "benign attitude to other [ethical, religious] positions". Dundas states this is a misreading of historical texts and Mahāvīra's teachings. According to him, the "many pointedness, multiple perspective" teachings of the Mahāvīra is about the nature of absolute reality and human existence. He claims that it is not about condoning activities such as killing animals for food, nor violence against disbelievers or any other living being as "perhaps right". The five vows for Jain monks and nuns, for example, are strict requirements and there is no "perhaps" about them. Similarly, since ancient times, Jainism co-existed with Buddhism and Hinduism according to Dundas, but Jainism disagreed, in specific areas, with the knowledge systems and beliefs of these traditions, and vice versa.

== History and Influence ==
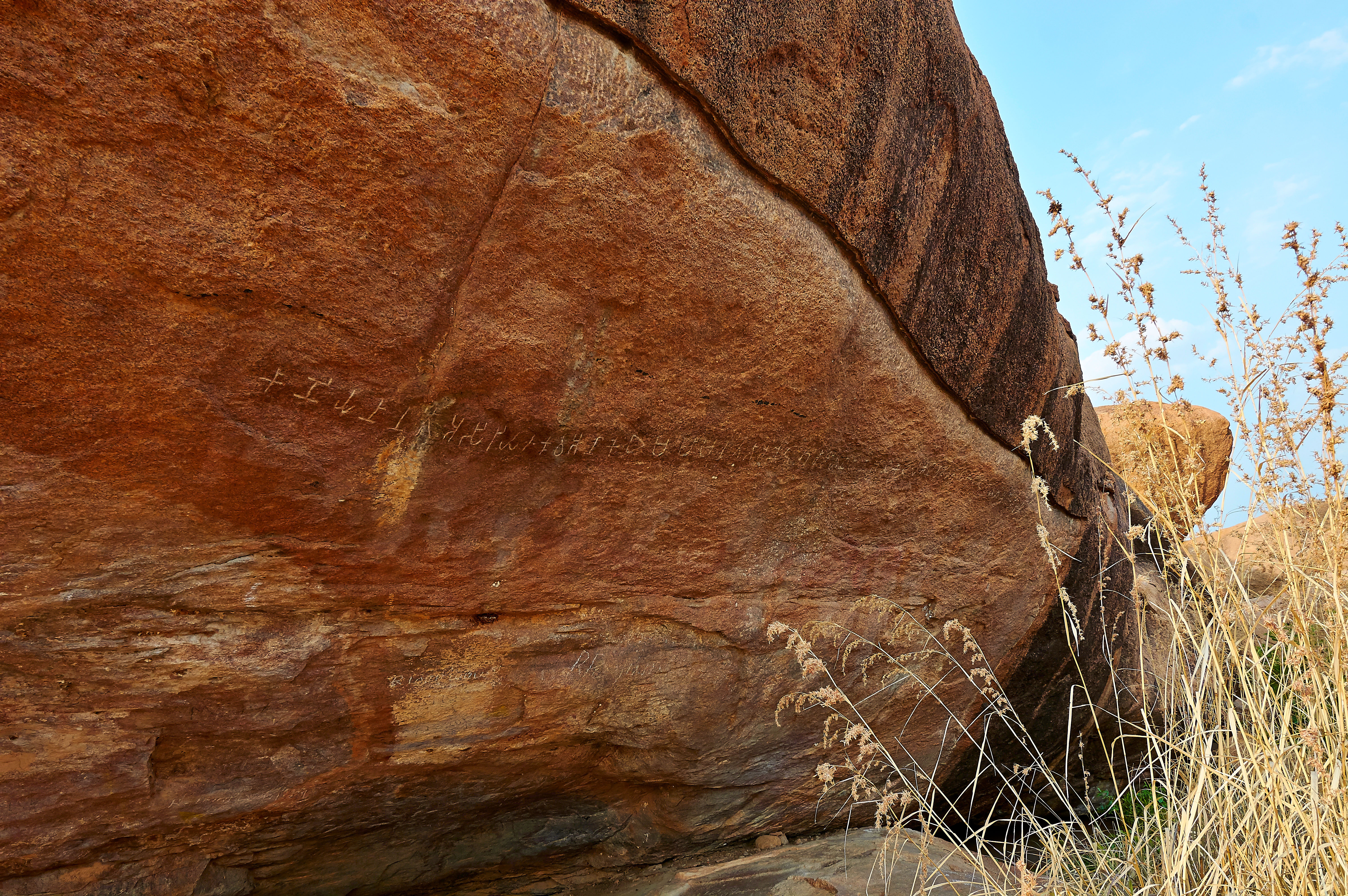
The longest inscription at the site, and the earliest known Tamil-Brāhmī inscription. It records the gift by the Pandya king Neṭuñceḻiyaṉ of a monastery to the senior Jain monk Nanta-siri Kuvaṉ.

The history of the Digambara tradition includes its divergence from the early Jain sangha, a period of significant royal patronage in Southern India, and the subsequent formation of various sub-sects.

The unified jain oral tradition faced a major crisis during the reign of Chandragupta Maurya (c. 324–297 BCE). Āchārya Bhadrabāhu, believed to be the last person who knew the complete original canon (including all fourteen Pūrvas), was the head of the Jain community. According to tradition, a severe 12-year famine struck the region of Magadha.

This famine led to a pivotal split. One group of monks, led by Bhadrabāhu, migrated south to Karnataka to survive. The monks who followed this stricter, ascetic path (including maintaining nudity) eventually formed the basis of the Digambara ("sky-clad") sect. Another group remained in the north under the leadership of Āchārya Sthūlabhadra. These monks began to adopt the practice of wearing white robes, forming the basis of the Śvetāmbara ("white-clad") sect. This geographical separation and the hardships of the famine severely disrupted the oral transmission of the extensive Jain canon.

=== Origins ===
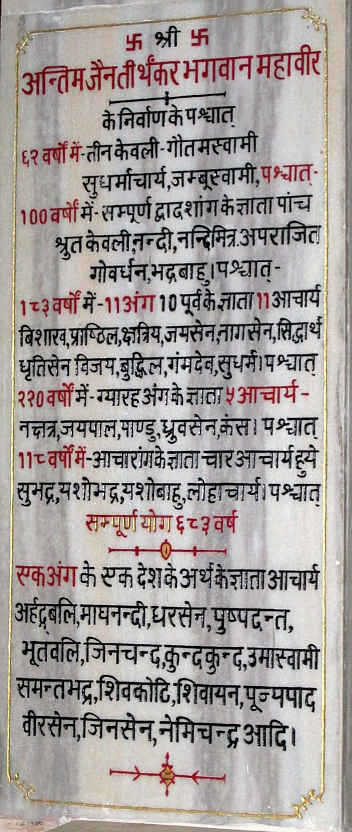
Stela at Marhiaji, Jabalpur, showing the transmission of the oral tradition, erected on the 2500th anniversary of Mahavira's nirvana

The Digambaras and Śvetāmbara disagree on how the Digambara subtradition started in Jainism. According to Digambaras, they are the original followers of Mahavira and Śvetāmbara branched off later in the time of Bhadrabahu when their forecast twelve-year famine triggered their migration from central India. One group of Jain monks headed west and north towards Rajasthan], while the second group headed south towards Karnataka. The former became Śvetāmbara and retained their "heretic" beliefs and practices such as wearing "white clothes" they adopted there, say the Digambaras.

In contrast, according to Śvetāmbara, they are the original followers, and Digambaras arose 609 years after the death of Mahavira (about 1st century CE) because of an arrogant man named Sivabhuti, who became a Jain monk in a fit of pique after a fight at home. However, according to Jinabhadra Gaṇi Kshamashramana, in his work Viśeṣāvaśyaka Bhāṣya, from which this account of the sect's creation is derived, he explicitly states that Sivabhuti was the eighth heretic who is regarded as the founder 'Bodiya ditthi' or Botika sect, also known as the Digambara sect. He is accused of starting the Digambara tradition with what Śvetāmbara refer to as "eight concealments", of rejecting Jain texts preserved by the Śvetāmbara tradition, and misunderstanding the Jain ideology including those related to nuns and clothes.

The earliest version of this Digambara story appears in the 10th century CE, while the earliest version of the Śvetāmbara story appears in the 5th century CE.

Oldest archeological evidence of Digambara Jains dates to the Mangalam Jain inscriptions which mention that workers of Neṭuñceḻiyaṉ I, a Pandyan king of Sangam period, (c. 270 BCE) made stone beds for Digambara Jain monks. It further details the name of the workers who made the stone beds. For example, an inscription shows that Kaṭalaṉ Vaḻuti, a worker (பணஅன் – accountant; he was also a relative) of Neṭuñceḻiyaṉ, made a stone bed for the Jain monk Nanta-siri Kuvaṉ.

In 1943, Heinrich Zimmer proposed that the Greek records of 4th-century BCE mention gymnosophists (naked philosophers) who may have links to the tradition of "naked ascetics" or Digambara. In 2011, Patrick Olivelle stated that the context in which the Greek records mention gymnosophists include ritual suicide by cremation traceable to ancient Brahmanism, rather than the traditional Jain ritual of embracing death by starvation and taking samadhi by voluntarily sacrificing everything including food and water (sallekhana). Tirthankara statues found in Mathura and dated to 2nd-century CE or after are naked. The oldest Tirthankara statue wearing a cloth is dated to the 5th century CE. Digamabara statues of Tirthankara belonging to Gupta period feature half-closed eyes.

Early Jain images from Mathura depict Digambara iconography until late fifth century CE where Śvetāmbara iconography starts appearing.

According to Digambara texts, after liberation of Mahavira, three Anubaddha Kevalīs attained Kevalajñāna (omniscience) sequentially – Gautama Gaņadhara, Acharya Sudharma Swami, and Jambusvami in next 62 years. During the next hundred years, five Āchāryas had complete knowledge of the scriptures, as such, called Śruta Kevalīs, the last of them being Āchārya Bhadrabahu. Spiritual lineage of heads of monastic orders is known as Pattavali. Digambara tradition considers Dharasena to be the 33rd teacher in succession of Gautama, 683 years after the nirvana of Mahavira.

=== Golden Age: Royal Patronage ===
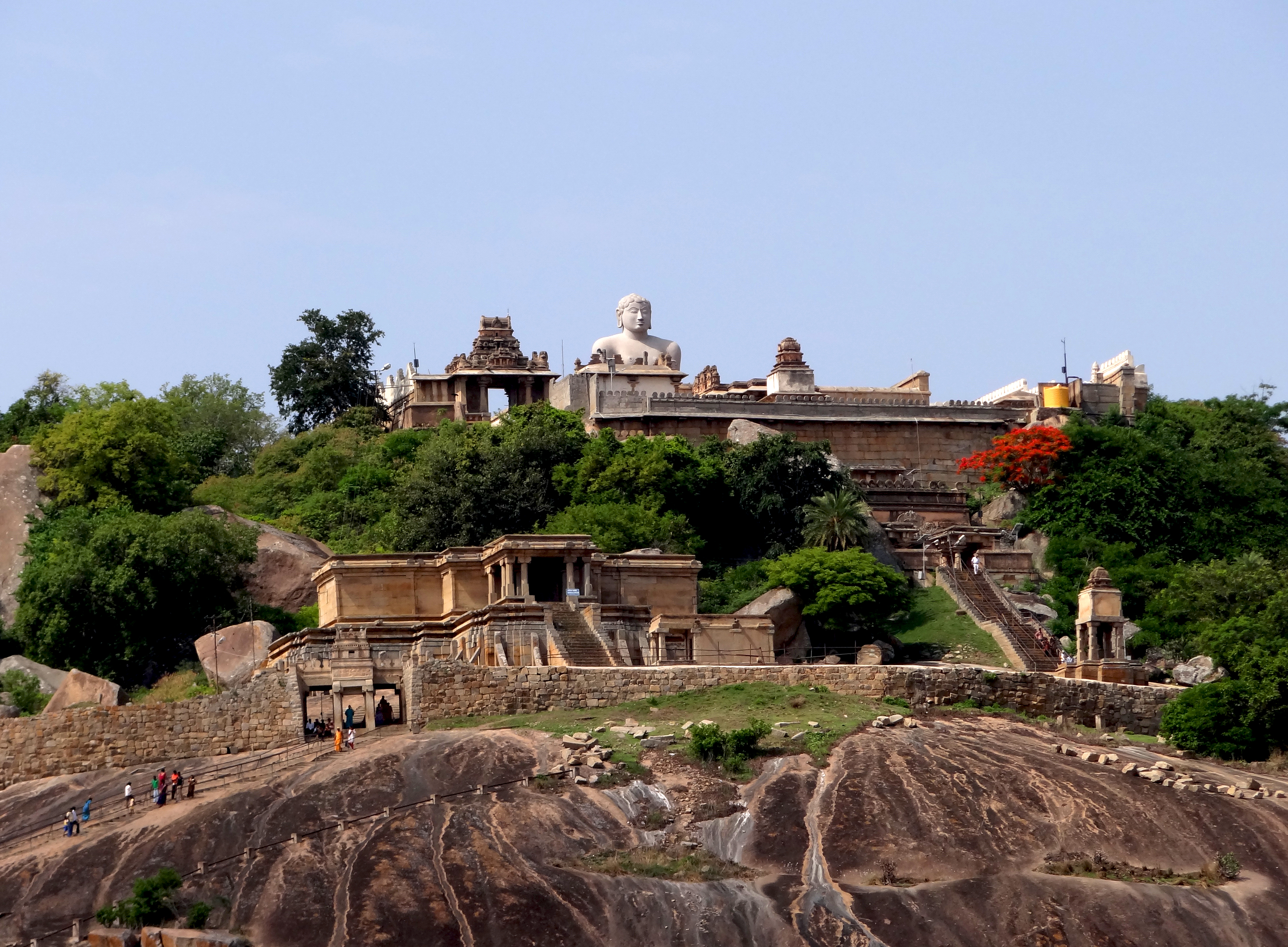
The Gommateshwara statue dated 978–993 on Vindhyagiri Hill

The Digambara tradition received significant royal patronage in the Deccan and South India from approximately the mid-first millennium CE onwards, particularly from the Western Ganga, Rashtrakuta, and Chalukya dynasties. This support allowed Digambara acharyas to hold positions of influence and led to the creation of durable artistic and architectural works.

Under the Rashtrakuta dynasty, the scholar Jinasena served as a preceptor to King Amoghavarsha I (r. 814–878 CE). Jinasena and his disciple Gunabhadra authored the Mahāpurāṇa, a foundational text that includes the Adipurana (lives of the first tirthankara) and Uttarapurana. This period also corresponds with the excavation of several Jain caves at Ellora, such as the Indra Sabha (Cave 32), which contain Digambara iconography.

In the Digambara tradition, the following lineage of teachers is revered: Mahavira, Gautama, Kundakunda, Bhadrabahu, Umaswami, Samantabhadra, Siddhasena Divakara, Pujyapada, Manatunga, Virasena, Jinasena, and Nemichandra. Kundakunda is considered the most significant scholar monk of the Digambara tradition of Jainism. He authored Prakrit texts such as the Samayasāra and the Pravacanasāra. Other prominent Acharyas of this tradition were, Virasena (author of a commentary on the Dhavala), Samantabhadra and Siddhasena Divakara. The Satkhandagama and Kasayapahuda have major significance in the Digambara tradition.

There have been several Digambara monastic lineages that all trace their descent to Mahavira. The historical lineages included Mula Sangha (further divided into Nandi, Sena, Simha and Deva Sanghas) and now largely extinct Kashtha Sangha (which included Mathura sangha, ""Lat-Vagad" etc.), Dravida Sangh. The text Darshana-Sara of Devasena discusses the supposed differences among the orders. The Mula sangha orders include Deshiya Gana (Bhattarakas of Shravanabelgola etc.) and Balatkara Gana (Bhattarakas of Humcha, and numerous lineages of North/Central India) traditions. The Bhattarakas of Shravanabelagola and Mudbidri belong to Deshiya Gana and the Bhattaraka of Humbaj belongs to the Balatkara Gana.

=== Medieval and Modern Eras (Sub-sects) ===
Throughout most of the second millennium CE, Digambara ascetic traditions were primarily organised around institutional lineages of bhattārakas. In the 17th-century, the lay-led Adhyatma movement in Agra led to the split between the Terapanthi and Bisapanthi sub-sects over the authority of bhattarakas and specific ritual practices. King Jai Singh II (1688–1743) of Amer kingdom built separate temples for the two sub-sects in his newly established capital of Jaipur. Terapanthis, led by scholars like Pandit Todarmal and Banarasidas, rejected the authority of bhattarakas.

Jain Digambara Sects
- Jain Sangh
  - Digambara
    - Mula Sangh
      - Great Schools
        - Nandi Gana
          - Balatkara Gana
          - Desiya Gana
        - Sena Gana
        - Simha Gana
        - Deva Gana
      - Other Mula Sangh branches (extinct)
      - Kashtha Sangh (exists)
    - Present Sects
      - Taran Panth
      - Bispanthi
      - Digambar Terapanth
      - Other
        - Kanji Swami Panth established by ex-Sthanakvasi monk.
        - Gumanpanth
        - Totapanth

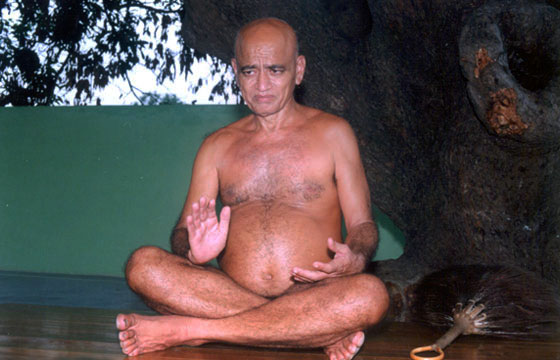
Acharya Vidyasagar, a prominent Digambara monk

Modern Digambara community is divided into various sub-sects viz. Terapanthi, Bispanthi, Taranpanthi (or Samayiapanthi), Gumanapanthi, Totapanthi and Kanjipanthi. Both the terapanthis and bisapanthis worship with ashta-dravya which includes jal (water), chandan (sandal), akshata (sacred rice), pushp (yellow rice), deep (yellow dry coconut), dhup (kapoor or cloves) and phal (almonds). Bisapanthi religious practices include aarti and offerings of flowers, fruits and prasad whereas terapanthis don't use them. Bispanthis worship minor gods and goddesses like Yaksha and Yakshini like Bhairava and Kshetrapala whereas terapanthis do not. Bisapanthis accept bhattarakas as their religious leaders but terapanthis do not. Terapanthis occur in large numbers in Rajasthan, Uttar Pradesh and Madhya Pradesh. Bisapanthis are concentrated in Rajasthan, Gujarat, Maharastra and South India.

== Scripture and literature ==
The Digambara sect of Jainism rejects the texts and canonical literature of the Śvetāmbara sect. They believe that the words of Mahavira neither survive nor could be recorded. The original teachings went through a rapid period of decline, state the Digambaras, and Śvetāmbara claims of preserving the sacred knowledge and ancient angas is false.

According to the Digambaras, their 33rd achārya was Dharasena who knew portions 12th Anga, the Drṣṭivada, that contained material from the Purvas that dealt with karma theory. Dharasena (ca. 137 C.E.) taught what he remembered from this text to his disciples, Puspadanta and Bhutabali, who wrote the Ṣaṭkhaṅḍāgama ("Scripture in Six Parts"). Dharasena's teachings that have survived are Satkhaṇḍāgama and Kasayapahuda (Treatise on the Passions), which were written on palm leaves near a cave in Mount Girnar (Gujarat) and a copy of which with a 12th-century commentary came to Tulu Nadu (south Karnataka). This has survived as the Mudbidri manuscripts, which were used by regional Jains not for reading and study, but as an object of devotional worship for centuries. In the 19th century, the fragile and decaying manuscript was copied and portions of it leaked to scholars between 1896 and 1922 despite objections of Digambara monks. It is considered to be the oldest known Digambara text ultimately traceable to the 2nd-century.

These two oldest known Digambara tradition texts – Satkhandagama and Kasayapahuda – are predominantly a treatise about the soul and Karma theory, written in Prakrit language. Philologically, the text belongs to about the 2nd-century, and has nothing that suggests it is of "immemorial antiquity". In details, the text is quite similar in its teachings to those found in Prajnapana – the 4th upanga – of Śvetāmbaras. Between the two, the poetic meter of Satkhandagama suggests it was composed after the Śvetāmbara text.

Digambaras, unlike Śvetāmbaras, do not have a canon. They do have a quasi-canonical literature grouped into four literary categories called anuyoga (exposition) since the time of the Digambara scholar Rakshita. The prathmanuyoga (first exposition) contains the universal history, the karananuyoga (calculation exposition) contains works on cosmology, the charananuyoga (behaviour exposition) includes texts about proper behaviour for monks and lay people, while the dravyanuyoga (entity exposition) contains metaphysical discussions. In the Digambara tradition, it is not the oldest texts that have survived in its temples and monasteries that attract the most study or reverence, but the late 9th-century Mahapurana (universal history) of Jinasena that is the most revered and cherished. The Mahapurana includes not only religious history, but also the sociological history of the Jaina people – including the Jain caste system and its origins as formulated by Rishabhanatha – from the Digambara Jaina perspective. The Digamabara tradition maintains a long list of revered teachers, and this list includes Kundakunda, Samantabhadra, Pujyapada, Jinasena, Akalanka, Vidyanandi, Somadeva and Asadhara.

The Digambara scriptures consist of post-canonical texts authored by various mendicant leaders, categorized into four sections known as Anuyogas ("Expositions"). These holy scriptures where written by great acharyas from 100 to 800 AD and are established on the original agam sutras. Notable works from each category are listed below.

- Prathamanuyoga ("Primary Expositions"). Biographies of the Tirthankaras and famous mythological figures.
1. Padmapurāṇa of Ravisena (7th century).
2. Adipurāṇa of Jinasena (8th century).
3. Harivamsapurāna of Jinasena (8th century).
4. Uttarapurāna of Gunabhadra (9th century).
- Karaṇānuyoga ("Expositions on Technical Matters"). Texts on cosmology, astronomy, karma, and mathematics.
1. Trilokaprajñapti (Tiloyapaṇṇatti) of Yativṛşabha (ca. 6th- 7th centuries).
2. Dhavala and Mahādhavalā of Virasena, commentaries on the Şatkhaṇḍāgama (9th century).
3. Jayadhavala of Virasena and Jinasena, commentary on the Kaşayaprabhṛta (9th century).
4. Gommatasära and Trilokasära of Nemicandra-Siddhantacakravarti (11th century).
- Carananuyoga ("Expositions on Conduct"). Texts on mendicant and lay conduct.
1. Mülăcăra of Vaṭṭakera (ca. 2nd century).
2. Bhagavati Ārādhanā of Śivārya (ca. 2nd century).
3. Niyamasära of Kundakunda (ca. 2nd or 3rd century).
4. Pravacanasăra of Kundakunda (ca. 2nd or 3rd century).
5. Samayasara of Kundakunda (ca. 2nd or 3rd century).
6. Ratnakaranda-Śrāvakācāra of Samantabhadra (2th century).
- Dravyanuyoga ("Expositions on Substances"). Texts on philosophy and logic.
1. Tattvärthädhigama Sutra/Tattvärtha Sutra of Umǎsvāmī (ca. 2nd century).
2. Pañcāstikāyasāra of Kundakunda (ca. 2nd or 3rd century).
3. Nyāyāvatāra and Sanmatisūtra of Siddhasena Divakara (5th century).
4. Aptamimāmsā of Samantabhadra (5th century).
5. Various works by later authors, such as Akalanka (8th century) and Vidyananda (9th century).

== Practices ==
=== Monasticism ===
The lifestyle and behavioral conduct of a Digambara monk is guided by a code called mulacara (mulachara). This includes 28 mūla guņas (primary attributes) for the monk. The oldest text containing these norms is the 2nd-century Mulachara attributed to Vattekara, that probably originated in the Mathura region.

These are: 5 mahāvratas (great vows); 5 samitis (restraints); 5 indriya nirodha (control of the five senses); 6 āvaśyakas (essential observations); and 7 niyamas (rules).

| No. | Guna (attribute) | Remarks |
|---|---|---|
| Mahavratas- Five Great Vows | 1. Ahimsa | Neither injure, nor ask, nor encourage another to injure any living being through actions, words or thoughts. This includes injury caused by cooking, starting a fire to cook, plucking a fruit, or any conduct that harms living beings |
| Mahavratas- Five Great Vows | 2. Satya | To speak the truth, to remain silent if his speaking the truth will lead to injury to living beings |
| Mahavratas- Five Great Vows | 3. Asteya | Not to take anything unless given, and not accepting anything more than what is necessary and needed |
| Mahavratas- Five Great Vows | 4. Brahmacharya | No sex, no natural or unnatural sexual gratification through action (viewing, participating, encouraging), words (hearing, reciting, reading, writing), or thoughts |
| Mahavratas- Five Great Vows | 5. Aparigraha | Renunciation of all worldly things, property, want, and all possessions external to soul |
| Samiti- Regulations | 6. irya | Walk carefully on much trodden paths, after viewing land to the extent of four cubits (2 yards). Do not walk in the dark or on the grass to avoid accidental injury to other living beings. He should not run to save himself if charged by a wild animal or if a violent person is about to injure him, as running can cause injury to other living beings. |
| Samiti- Regulations | 7. bhasha | Avoid slander, back-biting, false speech. He must avoid intentionally long or short statements that mislead or help create misunderstanding, doubts, misinformation, hypocrisy, bad blood or conceit in his audience. |
| Samiti- Regulations | 8. esana | To never accept objectionable food nor eat more palatable items from those received. |
| Samiti- Regulations | 9. adana-nikshepana | Carefulness in the handling the pichchi (feather bundle to remove insects in his path) and kamandalu (hollow vegetable gourd to filter water) |
| Samiti- Regulations | 10. pratishṭapan | To excrete body waste after carefully brushing aside insects and other living beings. |
| Indrinirodha | 11–15. Control of the five senses | Shedding all attachment and aversion towards the sense objects pertaining to touch (sparśana), taste (rasana), smell (ghrāṇa), sight (cakśu), and hearing (śrotra). The sadhu (monk) must eradicate all desires and activities that please the mind through his senses. He must end all ties, relationships and entanglements with his family and friends before he renounced. |
| Avasyakas – Essential observations | 16. Sāmāyika | Practice equanimous dispassion towards everything for eighteen ghari a day (1 ghari = about 24 minutes) |
| Avasyakas – Essential observations | 17. stuti | Salute the divine (Tirthankaras) |
| Avasyakas – Essential observations | 18. vandana | Medidate upon and adore acharyas, gurus, idols and images of gods |
| Avasyakas – Essential observations | 19. Pratikramana | Confession, repentance and self-censure for having violated any vows and rules of conduct; dissociate one's soul from any virtuous or evil karmas, in the current or past lives. |
| Avasyakas – Essential observations | 20. Pratikhayan | Recite mantra that lists and promises future renunciation of food, drink and comforts and to forfend future faults |
| Avasyakas – Essential observations | 21. Kayotsarga | Giving up attachment to the body for a limited period of time. Typically, this is a standing naked and motionless posture of a form common in Bahubali iconography. |
| Niyama- Rules | 22. adantdhavan | Never clean teeth |
| Niyama- Rules | 23. bhushayan | Sleep on hard ground |
| Niyama- Rules | 24. asnāna | Never bathe |
| Niyama- Rules | 25. stithi-bhojan | Eat food in standing posture, accept food in open palms (no utensils) |
| Niyama- Rules | 26. ahara | Eat food once a day, drink water only when eating meal |
| Niyama- Rules | 27. keśa-lonch | To periodically pluck all hair on his body by his own hand. |
| Niyama- Rules | 28. nudity | Remain completely nude all the time (digambara) |

Digambara monks do not wear any clothes as it is considered to be parigraha (possession), which ultimately leads to attachment. The monks carry picchi, a broom made up of fallen peacock feathers for removing small insects to avoid causing injury and Kamandalu (the gourd for carrying pure, sterilized water). The head of all monastics is called Āchārya, while the saintly preceptor of saints is the upādhyāya. The Āchārya has 36 primary attributes (mūla guņa) in addition to the 28 mentioned above.

The monks perform kayotsarga daily, in a rigid and immobile posture, with the arms held stiffly down, knees straight, and toes directed forward.

=== Nuns ===
Female monastics in Digambara tradition are known as aryikas. Digambara nuns, unlike the monks in their tradition, wear clothes. Given their beliefs such as non-attachment and non-possession, the Digambara tradition has held that women cannot achieve salvation (moksha) as men can, and the best a nun can achieve is to be reborn as a man in the next rebirth. The monks are held to be of higher status than nuns in Digambara monasteries, states Jeffery Long. From the Digambara monk's perspective, both Digambara nuns and Śvetāmbara monastic community are simply more pious Jain laypeople, who do not or are unable to fully practice the Jain monastic vows.

Digambara nuns are relatively rare in comparison to the nuns found in Śvetāmbara traditions. According to a 1970s and 1980s survey of Jain subtraditions, there were about 125 Digambara monks in India and 50 Digambara nuns. This compared to 3,400 nuns and 1,200 monks in the Śvetāmbara tradition.

=== Digambar akhara ===
The Digambar Akhara, which along with other akharas, also participates in various inter-sectarian (sampradaya) religious activities including Kumbh Melas, is completely unrelated to Digambar Jain tradition, even though they also practice nudity.

=== Worship ===
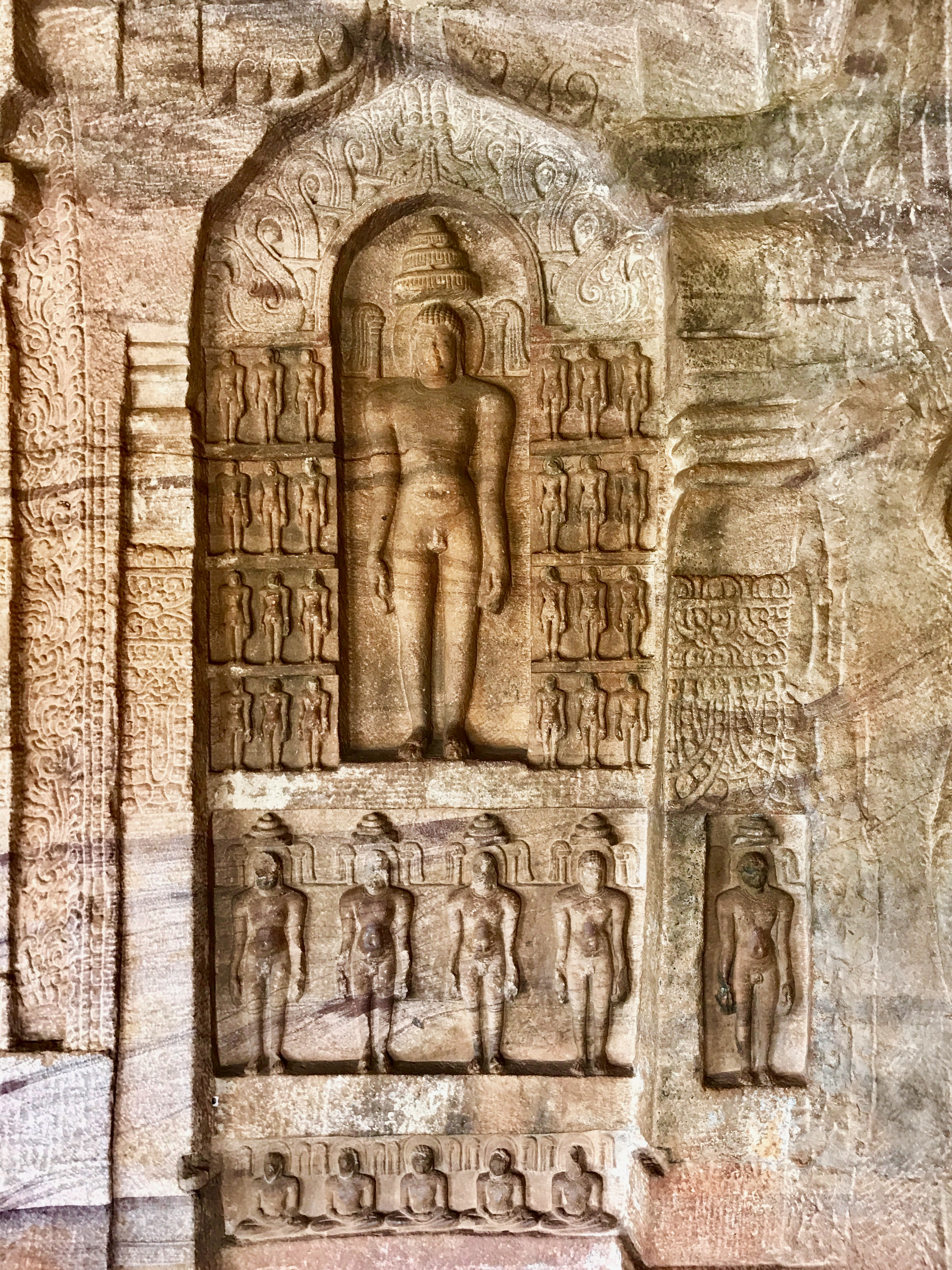
Adinatha image (Badami caves)

The Digambara Jains worship completely nude idols of tirthankaras (omniscient beings) and siddha (liberated souls). The tirthankara is represented either seated in yoga posture or standing in the Kayotsarga posture.

The truly "sky-clad" (digambara) Jaina statue expresses the perfect isolation of the one who has stripped off every bond. His is an absolute "abiding in itself," a strange but perfect aloofness, a nudity of chilling majesty, in its stony simplicity, rigid contours, and abstraction.

— Heinrich Zimmer

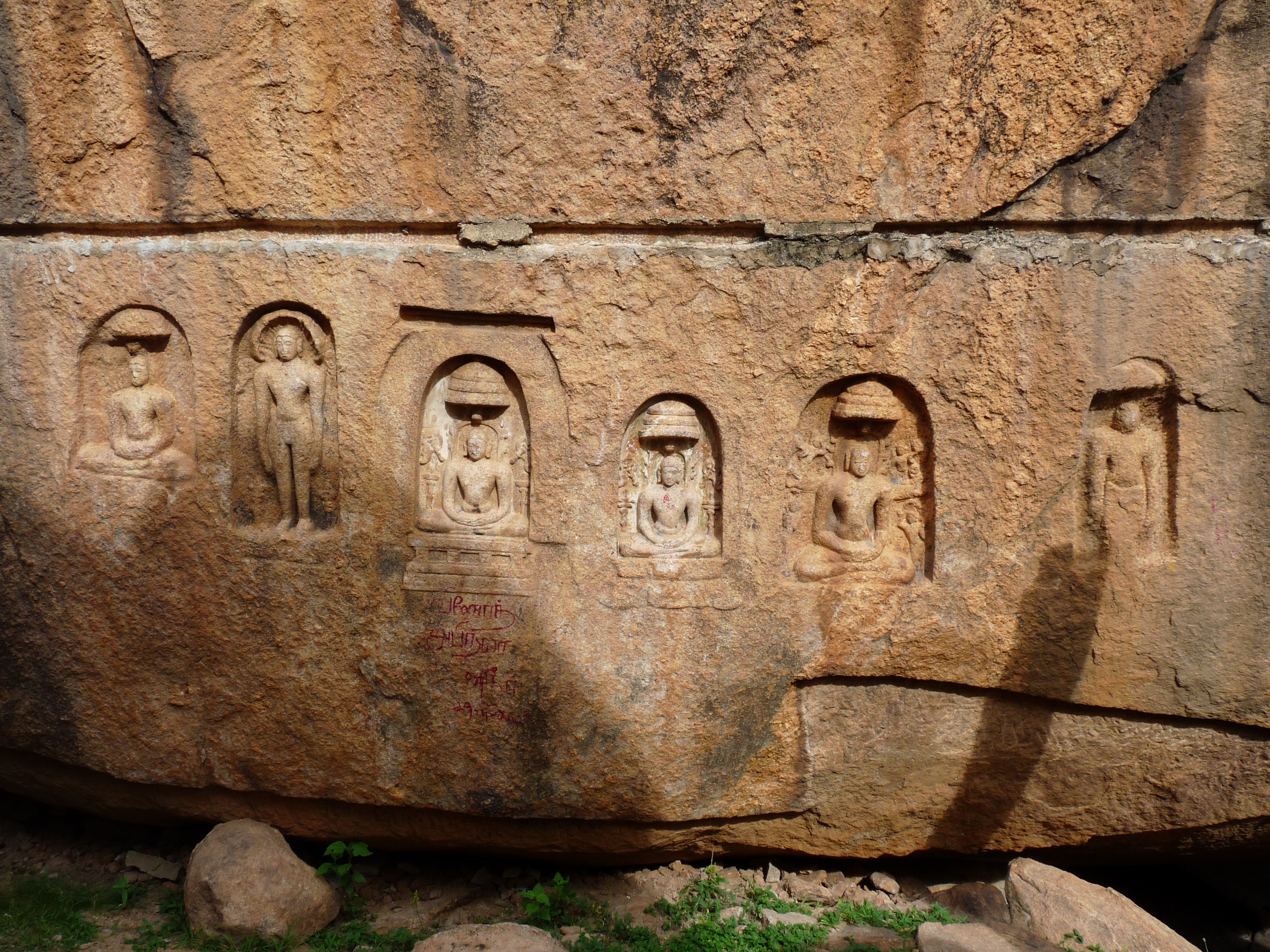
Kizhavalavu (Keelavalavu) Sculptures

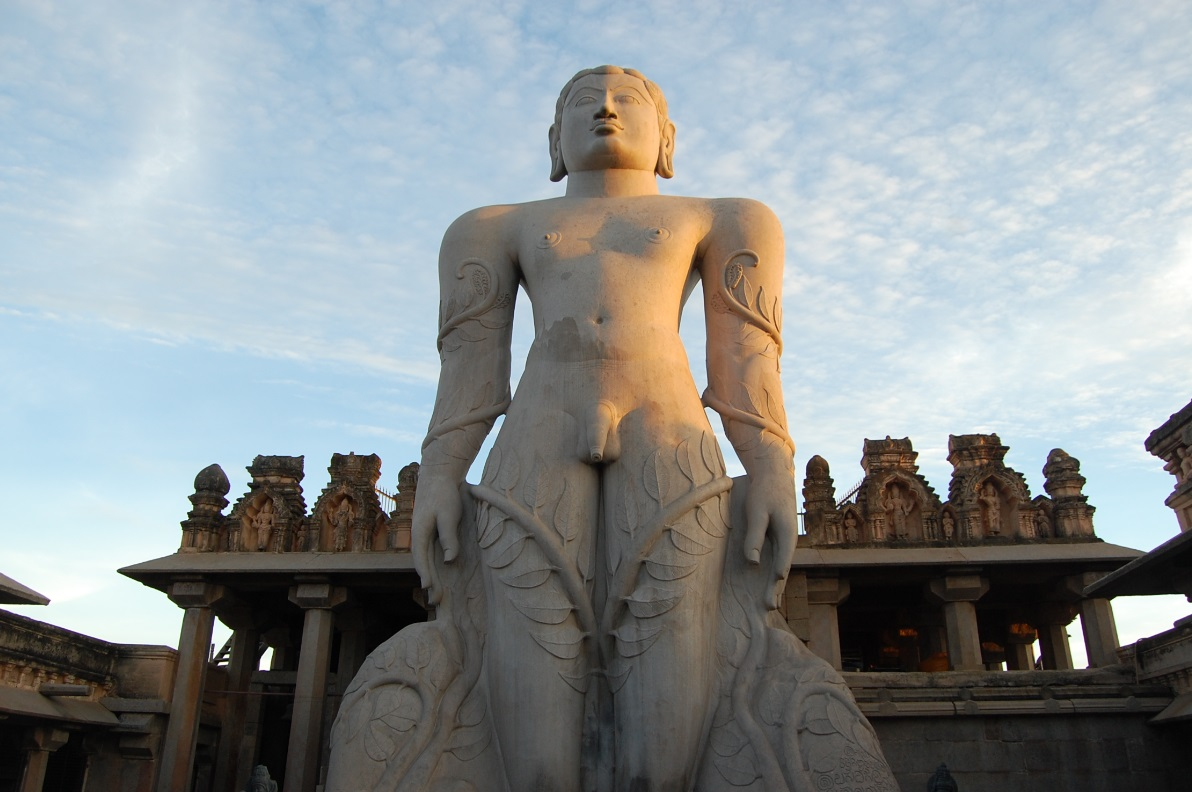
The 57 feet (17 m) high Gommateshwara statue, Shravanabelagola

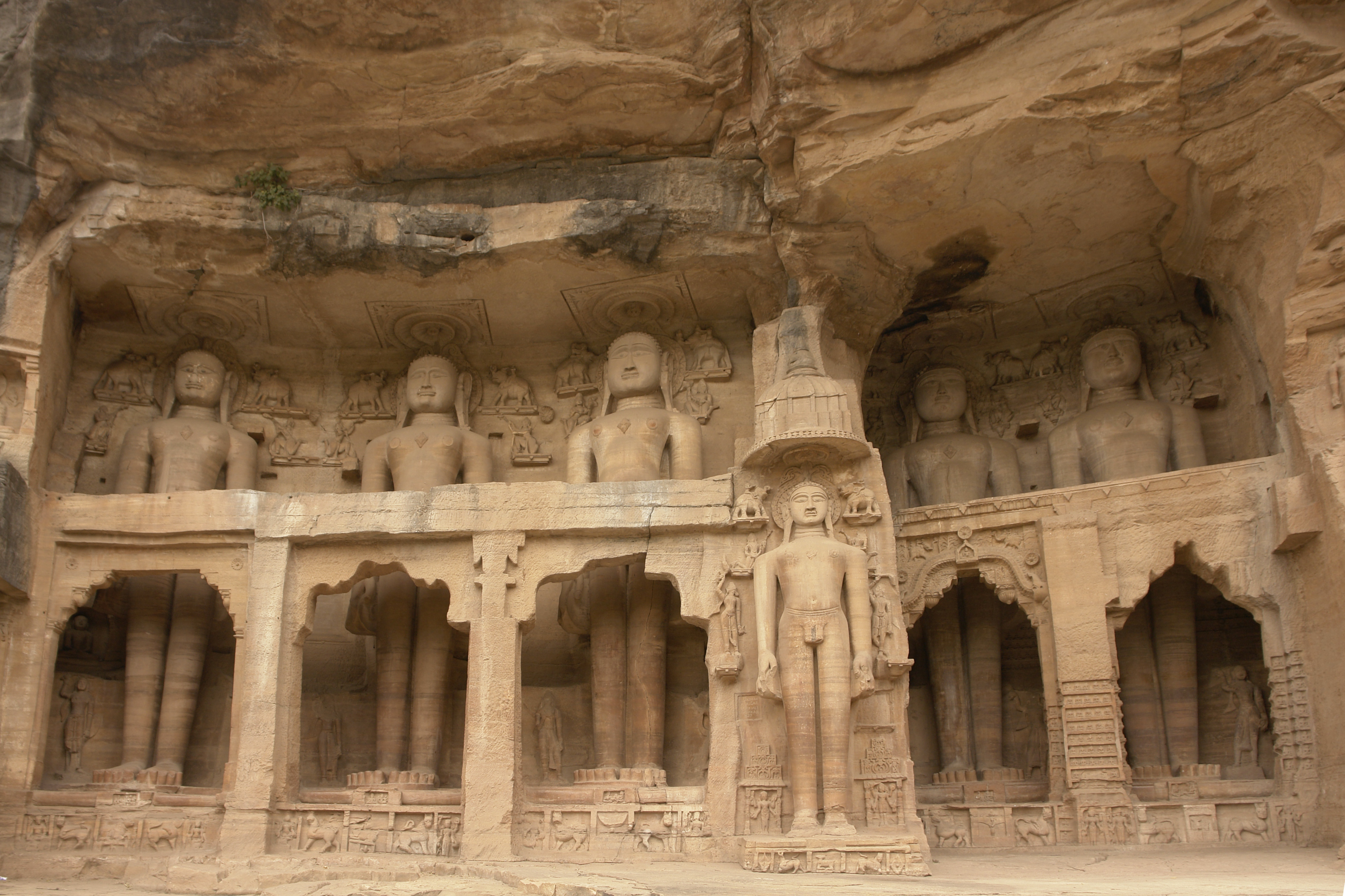
Tirthankara statues at Siddhachal Caves inside Gwalior Fort, Madhya Pradesh

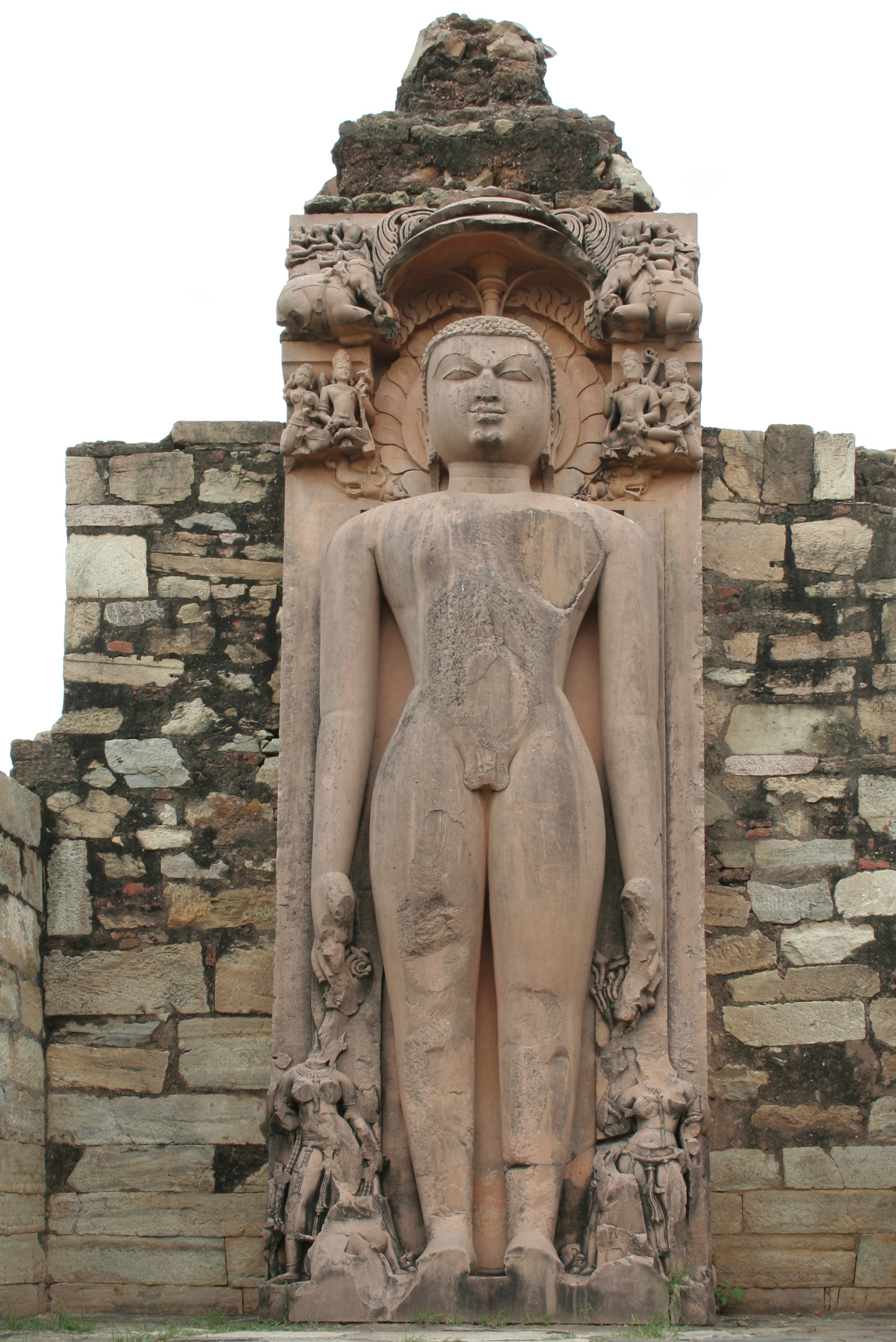
Tirthankara Parshvanatha statue, Rajasthan

== Comparison with Śvetāmbara Tradition ==
In 1124 CE, a fierce debate between Śvetāmbaras and Digambaras happened. The background of the debate goes back to the 1124 CE cāturmāsya of Ācārya Vādidevasūri, a celebrated disciple of Ācārya Municandrasūri, a Śvetāmbara monk. Vādidevasūri was popular for winning debates against several philosophers in Western and North-Western India. Vādidevasūri was in Karnavati (modern-day Ahmedabad's old city) for his 4 months-long stay during the rainy season. During the same time, Kumudcandra, a Digambara monk and the preceptor of Jayakeśi, a Kadamba ruler, was also in the city for his 4 months-long stay during the rainy season. As per medieval Digambara records, Kumudcandra was of formidable intellect and very popular in the Digambara community. As described in Ācārya Prabhācandrasūri's Prabhāvakacarita, Kumudcandra and his disciples tried creating several problems in Vādidevasūri's sangha there. This was probably because the former could not digest the popularity of Vādidevasūri in the Śvetāmbara sangha there. The latter, however, maintained equanimity and did not retaliate. The situation got serious when Kumudcandra and some of his disciples harassed Sādhvī Sarasvatīśrījī, a senior nun in Vādidevasūri's sangha, while she was walking on the road. After mocking her, some disciples and palanquin-bearers of Kumudcandra demanded she dance if she wanted to pass. After the humiliation, she requested Vādidevasūri to take appropriate action and that if this went unanswered, the entire Jaina sangha would crumble. Vādidevasūri wrote to Kumudcandra and informed him that he would have a debate with him in the court of Jayasimha Siddharaja, in Patan. Vādidevasūri wrote to the Jaina sangha at Patan, seeking permission to hold an open public debate between the Śvetāmbaras and the Digambaras. The sangha accepted his letter and wrote back that they would be highly honored to host the debate and that 300 male devotees and 700 female devotees would hold āyaṃbila fast until the day of the debate, praying for his victory.

Vādidevasūri reached Patan, and was soon followed by Kumudcandra. The situation was heavily influenced by politics. Rājamātā Minaladevi was in unconditional support of Kumudcandra. Apart from her, Kumudcandra was also supported by several courtiers and laymen. Prabhāvakacarita names Keśava as one of his supporters, while it names poet Śrīpāla and Bhānu as Vādidevasūri's supporters. Thāhaḍ and Nāgadeva, two Śrāvakas of Vādidevasūri's sangha expressed their wish to spend as much wealth as required for this event. However, Vādidevasūri informed them that spending of any wealth was not required for this event. Thāhaḍ informed him that Kumudcandra's disciples had offered bribe to Gāngila, a minister in Jayasimha Siddharaja's court. Vādidevasūri did not pay attention to it and told him that it would surely be won by the one who has the blessings of God and his preceptor. The terms set by Rājamātā Minaladevi were unfair. If Vādidevasūri lost, all Śvetāmbaras would have convert to the Digambara sect. If Kumudcandra lost, the Digambaras would have to leave Jayasimha Siddharaja's kingdom.

On Vaiśākha Pūrṇimā of 1124 CE, the debate began. Kumudcandra mocked a young Hemacandrasūri, who was accompanying Vādidevasūri, by calling him an infant and unfit for this debate. A witty Hemacandrasūri responded by saying that he was dressed, while an infant is one who is naked, aiming at Kumudcandra's Digambara lifestyle (staying nude) and that Kumudcandra, and not he, was an infant. Several exchanges took place between both Vādidevasūri and Kumudcandra. The former was very well-versed with Jaina scriptures and tenets and made sure that no possibility was left unexplored during the debate. Within mere 16 days of the debate's conception, and several instances where Kumudcandra and his disciples faltered, the debate moved towards the subject of women's emancipation which Śvetāmbaras firmly believe in, while Digambaras don't. Digambaras, unable to provide a strong reason to support their heretical belief that women could not achieve emancipation, lost. Similar faults were observed when the subject of kevalins' hunger came up. Vādidevasūri was well-learned and astute and eventually, he triumphed. Vādidevasūri reminded Jayasimha Siddharaja that it was his duty to ensure no one insulted the defeated. The king ordered all Digambaras to immediately leave his kingdom and carried a royal procession to a nearby temple. Śvetāmbaras celebrated this victory and several devotees donated lakhs of gold coins in the temple. As a mark of respect, the ceremonial parasol over Vādidevasūri was carried by the king himself. This record is accepted as historically true, due to its narration found in Prabhāvakacarita, a historical text. While Vādidevasūri went on to write several scriptures and consecrate several major pilgrimage sites, Digambaras, once again, lost all presence in the kingdom of Gujarat. Previously, Digambaras had lost another debate against Ācārya Bappabhattisuri over the ownership of Girnar Jain temples.

Other than rejecting or accepting different ancient Jain texts, Digambaras and Śvetāmbara differ in other significant ways such as:

- Śvetāmbaras believe that Parshvanatha, the 23rd tirthankara, taught only Four restraints (a claim, scholars say is confirmed by the ancient Buddhist texts that discuss Jain monastic life).

These are as follows 1. Ahimsa – nonviolence, non-injury, and absence of desire to harm any life forms. 2. Satya – truthful in one's thoughts, speech and action. 3. Asteya – non-stealing". One must not steal, nor have the intent to steal, another's property through action, speech, and thoughts. 4. Aparigraha – the virtue of non-possessiveness or non-greediness.

Mahavira inserted 5th vow ie Brahmacharya – sexual restraint or practice of celibacy. Renunciation of sex and marriage. This was thought to be understood to within 4th vow of Aparigraha, but was more specified as 5th vow of Brahmacharya.

Mahāvīra taught Five vows. The Digambara sect disagrees with the Śvetāmbara interpretations, and reject the theory of difference in Parshvanatha and Mahāvīra's teachings. However, Digambaras as well as Śvetāmbaras follow Five vows as taught by Mahavira. The difference is only that Śvetāmbaras believe Parshvanatha taught one vow less (the Four vows except Brahmacharya) than Mahavira. However, monks of Śvetāmbara sect also follow all 5 vows as stated in the Ācārāṅga Sūtra.

- Digambaras believe that both Parshvanatha and Mahāvīra remained unmarried, whereas Śvetāmbara believe the 23rd and 24th tirthankar did indeed marry. According to the Śvetāmbara version, Parshvanāth married Prabhavati, and Mahāvīraswāmi married Yashoda who bore him a daughter named Priyadarshana. The two sects also differ on the origin of Trishala, Mahāvīra's mother, as well as the details of Tirthankara's biographies such as how many auspicious dreams their mothers had when they were in the wombs.
- Digambara believe Rishabha, Vasupujya and Neminatha were the three tirthankaras who reached omniscience while in sitting posture and other tirthankaras were in standing ascetic posture. In contrast, Śvetāmbaras believe it was Rishabha, Nemi and Mahāvīra who were the three in sitting posture.
- According to Śvetāmbara Jain texts, from Kalpasūtras onwards, its monastic community has had more sadhvis than sadhus (female than male mendicants). In Tapa Gacch of the modern era, the ratio of sadhvis to sadhus (nuns to monks) is about 3.5 to 1. In contrast to Śvetāmbara, the Digambara sect monastic community has been predominantly male.
- In the Digambara tradition, a male human being is considered closest to the apex with the potential to achieve his soul's liberation from rebirths through asceticism. Women must gain karmic merit, to be reborn as man, and only then can they achieve spiritual liberation in the Digambara sect of Jainism. The Śvetāmbaras disagree with the Digambaras, believing that women can also achieve liberation from saṃsāra through ascetic practices.
- The Śvetāmbaras state the 19th Tirthankara Māllīnātha was female. However, Digambara reject this, and worship Mallinatha as a male.
- According to Digambara texts, after attaining Kevala Jnana (omniscience), arihant (omniscient beings) are free from human needs like hunger, thirst, and sleep. In contrast, Śvetāmbara texts preach that it is not so.

== Criticism ==
=== Padmanabh Jaini ===
Padmanabh Jaini, a renowned Jain scholar, after researching the scriptures of the Digambara sect described several points of critique: -

1. Rituals and ascetic practices: Jaini points out that an emphasis on extreme ascetic practices such as public nudity and rejection of all possessions leads to a diminished focus on spiritual growth and a greater focus on the less important ritualistic practices.
2. Layperson-ascetic dichotomy: Jaini critiques the sharp distinction between the ascetics and laypeople which leads to a lack of spiritual agency among people.
3. Scriptural authority: Jaini questions the Digambara reliance on a highly limited set of scriptures that do not fully represent Jain principles and teachings as followed by the Svetambara sect. Jaini questions the Digambara rejection of the Śvētāmbara canonical scriptures. He argues that this rejection leads to a lack of unity and a fragmentation within Jainism. He also points out that the Digambaras' reliance on later texts as authentic scriptures might lack historical and textual rigor.
4. Gender and nudity: Jaini strongly argues that the practice of public nudity may reinforce patriarchal attitude and limit female spiritual agency. Digambaras hold that women must be reborn as men to attain salvation, which Jaini criticizes for its gender exclusivity and inequality. He argues that female nudity is not equally valued or allowed in the Digambara tradition which greatly limits female spiritual agency as Digambara belief states that moksha cannot be attained without nudity. Further, he states that male nudity leads to masculinization of spirituality. Jaini also mentions that the Digambara sect has historically been male-dominated with women facing several barriers in the path to spirituality and its evolution. His views are seconded by Paul Dundas who states that Digambara rejection of clothing could also signify their rejection of female bodily experience, as clothing is often associated with female modesty and domesticity.
5. Historical development: Jaini also deliberates that the Digambara tradition may have arisen in response to Hinduism, Ājīvikas, and Buddhism, rather than purely from within Jainism.

=== Nalini Balbir ===
Nalini Balbir, another renowned scholar of Jainism, has criticised the Digambara views on liberation of women and advocates for a more inclusive and gender-equal interpretation of the scriptures. She lists her criticism in the following manner: –

1. Gender bias: Balbir sees the Digambara belief of women not being capable of attaining liberation in their current birth as gender discrimination.
2. Biological determinism: Digambara scriptures attribute spiritual limitations of women to their biology and consider them as unholy. Balbir criticizes this view as narrow and outdated perspective.
3. Lack of scriptural basis: Balbir argues that the narrative describing women not being able to attain liberation is not supported by ancient Jain scriptures (Śvetāmbara canon) and is based on later commentaries.
4. Contradiction with Jain principles: Balbir points out that this view is in contradiction to the fundamental Jain principle of equality and the potential for all living beings to attain liberation.

Balbir states that:

The Digambara sect's view that women cannot achieve liberation in their present birth is a 'biological determinism' that is not supported by Jain scriptures. This view is a 'patriarchal interpretation' that has been 'superimposed' on the original teachings of Mahavira.

— Nalini Balbir, Women in Jainism (2005)

=== Kristi L. Wiley ===
Kristi L. Wiley, a scholar of Jainism, has also criticized the Digambara sect's views on liberation of women. Specifically, she highlights the following points of critique:

1. Exclusionary practices and patriarchal interpretations: Women are excluded from the highest spiritual status in Jainism (achieving liberation) by Digambara sect's scriptures. Wiley sees Digambara interpretations of Jain scriptures as patriarchal and biased against women.
2. Lack of agency: Digambaras deny the fundamental agency of achieving liberation (the highest status in Jain spirituality) through their own efforts, instead requiring them to rely on male intermediaries.
3. Inconsistencies with Jain principles: Wiley points out that these views are inconsistent with the fundamental principle of 'equal potential of all living beings to achieve liberation'. She adds that such views may constitute to 'symbolic violence' against women.
4. Textual manipulation: She alleges that the male-dominated Digambara sect has selectively interpreted and manipulated existing and ancient Jain texts to support their views by ignoring passages that highlight women's spiritual potential.

=== Other religions ===
Scriptures of other religions and schools of thought such as Buddhism, Islam, and Sikhism also criticize and condemn public nudity followed by Digambara monks.

== See also ==
- Nudity in religion
- God in Jainism
- Kshullak
- Jain philosophy
- Timeline of Jainism
- Digambar Jain Mahasabha
