= Lokasena =

10th-century Digambara Jain monk

Personal life
- Born: Lokasena, 9th–10th century CE
- Era: Rashtrakuta Empire
- Notable work: "Prashasti" to Mahapurana
- Occupation: Jain Monk, Author

Religious life
- Religion: Jainism
- Denomination: Digambar
- Creed: Jain

Religious career
- Disciple of: Acharya Gunabhadra

Lokasena was a Digambara Jain monk in the Kannada literary tradition, active during the reign of Rashtrakuta king Krishna II (Akalavarsha, r. 878–914 CE). He was a disciple of the Jain Acharya Gunabhadra, the co-author of the "Mahapurana" along with Acharya Jinasena.

Lokasena is known for composing the "prashasti" (eulogy) at the end of the Mahapurana, Where he mentioned that during his time Jain festival Called "Śrīpañcamī", Was being celebrated in Rashtrakuta Kingdom before the divine "Nandīśvara", This festival was held by Rashtrakuta King Krishna II (Akalavarsha), who had organised it. This eulogy is considered important evidence for the royal patronage of Jain religious activities during the Rashtrakuta period.

== See also ==
- Rashtrakuta literature
