= Amoghavarsha =

Rashtrakuta Emperor from 814 to 878

- Nripatunga; Atisaya-dhavala; Rattamarthanda; Srivallabha; Maharajashanda; Vira-Narayana
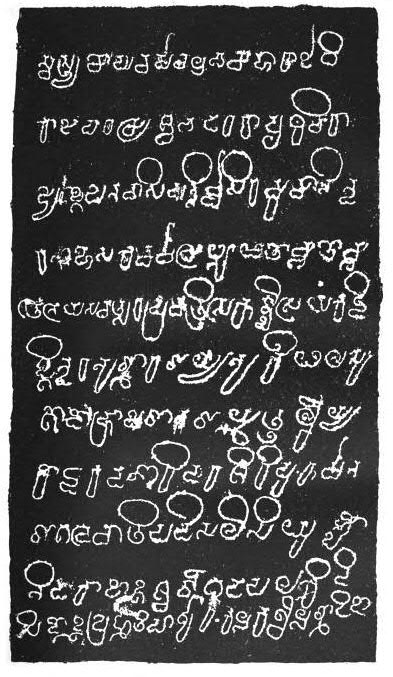
- Old Kannada inscription (876 CE) of Rashtrakuta Emperor Amoghavarsha I at the Veerabhadra temple in Kumsi

6th Rashtrakuta Emperor
- Reign: c. 814 – c. 878
- Predecessor: Govinda III
- Successor: Krishna II
- Born: Sharva or Shravan c. 800; Narmada River, Rashtrakuta Empire
- Died: 878 (aged 77–78) possibly Manyakheta, Rashtrakuta Empire (present-day Malkheda, Karnataka, India)
- Consort: Asagavve
- Issue: Krishna II; Chandrabbalabbe; Revakanimmadi
Regnal name
- Amoghavarsha
- House: Rashtrakuta
- Father: Govinda III
- Religion: Jainism

Amoghavarsha Nrupatunga (c. 800–878), also known as Amoghavarsha I, was the Rashtrakuta emperor from 814 until his death in 878. He is considered by many historians to be the greatest emperor of the Rashtrakuta dynasty. His reign of 64 years is one of the longest precisely dated monarchical reigns on record. Many Kannada and Sanskrit scholars prospered during his rule, including the great Indian Jain mathematician Mahaviracharya who wrote the Ganita-sara-samgraha, Shakatayan and Srivijaya (a Jain Kannada language theorist), as well as Jain Monks like Acharya Jinasena and Acharya Virasena, Acharya Gunabhadra.

Amoghavarsha was an accomplished poet and scholar. He wrote (or co-authored) the Kavirajamarga, the earliest extant literary work in Kannada, and Prashnottara Ratnamalika, a religious work in Sanskrit. During his rule he held titles such as Nrupathunga, Atishadhavala, Veeranarayana, Rattamarthanda and Srivallabha. He moved the Rashtrakuta regnal capital from Mayurkhandi in the present-day Bidar district to Manyakheta in the present-day Kalaburagi district in the modern Karnataka state. He is said to have built the imperial capital city to "match that of Lord Indra". The capital city was planned to include elaborately designed buildings for the royalty using the finest of workmanship.

According to the Arab traveller Sulaiman al-Tajir, Amoghavarsha I's empire was one among the four great contemporary empires of the world.

According to the "maṅgalācharaṇa" (auspicious invocation) of Mahaviracharya's "Gaṇita-sāra-saṅgraha", King Amoghavarṣa Nr̥patunga is praised as "a ruler under whom the people are very happy and the land yields abundant grain," with a blessing: "May the kingdom of Jain King Nripatunga Amoghavarsha ever increase far and wide".

== Early life ==
Amoghavarsha I, whose birth name was Sharva or Shravan, was born in the year 800 in Sribhavan on the banks of the river Narmada during the return journey of his father, Emperor Govinda III, from his successful campaigns in northern India. This information is available from the Manne inscription of 803 and the Sanjan plates of 871, both important sources of information about Amoghavarsha I. The Sirur plates further clarify that Amoghavarsha I ascended to the throne in 815 at the age of 14 after the death of his father. All his inscriptions thereafter refer to him as Amoghavarsha I.

A revolt led by some of his relatives together with feudatories of the empire temporarily unseated Amoghavarsha I, who, with the help of his cousin (Karka) also called Patamalla, re-established himself as the emperor by 821. This information comes from the Surat records and the Baroda plates of 835. The first to revolt was the Western Ganga feudatory led by King Shivamara II. In the series of battles that followed, Shivamara II was killed in 816. But Amoghavarsha I's commander and confidant, Bankesha, was defeated in Rajaramadu by the next Ganga king, Rachamalla. Due to the resilience of the Western Gangas, Amoghavarsha I was forced to follow a conciliatory policy. He gave in marriage his daughter, Chandrabbalabbe, to the Western Ganga King Butuga I, and another daughter, Revakanimmadi, to prince Ereganga. More revolts occurred between 818 and 820, but by 821 Amoghavarsha I had overcome all resistance and stabilised the empire to rule.

Emperor Amoghavarsha reigned from 815 to 877 CE.

== Wars in the south ==
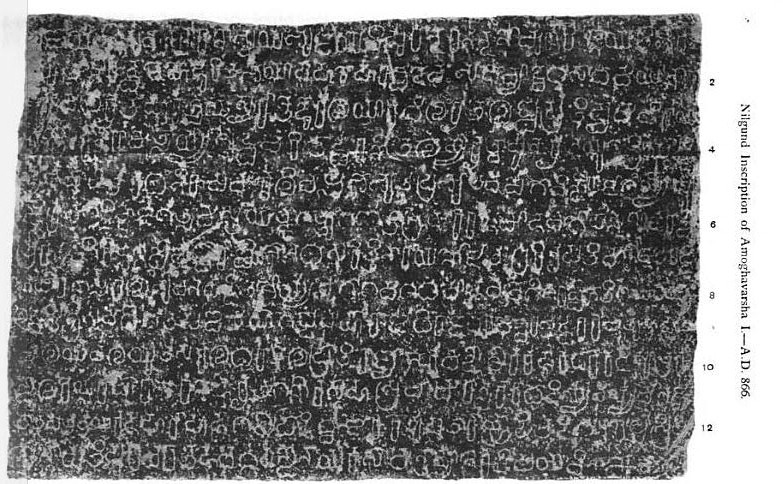
Bilingual old Kannada-Sanskrit inscription (866 CE) written in old Kannada script, from Nilgund of Rashtrakuta Emperor Amoghavarsha I

Vijayaditya II of the Eastern Chalukya family overthrew Bhima Salki, the ruling Rashtrakuta feudatory at Vengi, took possession of the throne and continued his hostilities against the Rashtrakutas. He captured Sthambha (modern Kammamettu), a Rashtrakuta stronghold. From the Cambay and Sangli plates it is known that Amoghavarsha I overwhelmingly defeated the Vengi Chalukyas and drove them out of their strongholds in the battle of Vingavalli. The Bagumra records mention a "Sea of Chalukyas" invading the Ratta kingdom which Amoghavarsha I successfully defended. After these victories he assumed the title Veeranarayana.

Tranquility was restored temporarily by a marriage between Vijayaditya II's son, Vishnuvardhana V, and the Ratta princess Shilamahadevi, a sister of Karka of the Gujarat Rashtrakuta branch. However, Vishnuvardhana V attacked the northern Kalachuri feudatory of the Rashtrakutas in Tripuri, central India, and captured Elichpur near Nasik. Amoghavarsha I killed Vishnuvardhana V in 846 but continued a friendly relationship with the next Eastern Chalukya ruler Gunaga Vijayaditya III, and suppressed the recalcitrant Alupas of South Canara under prince Vimaladitya in 870. Likewise, Amoghavarsha I maintained friendly interactions with the Pallava who were busy keeping the Pandyas at bay. The Pallavas had marital ties with the Rashtrakutas as well. Nandivarman III was married to a Ratta princess, Sankha, and their son was also called Nripathunga. This has prompted historians to suggest that the Pallava monarch must have married Nrupatunga Amoghavarsha I's daughter.

Amoghavarsha's reign lasted until 877 CE after which he had voluntarily retired from his imperial throne.

== Religion ==
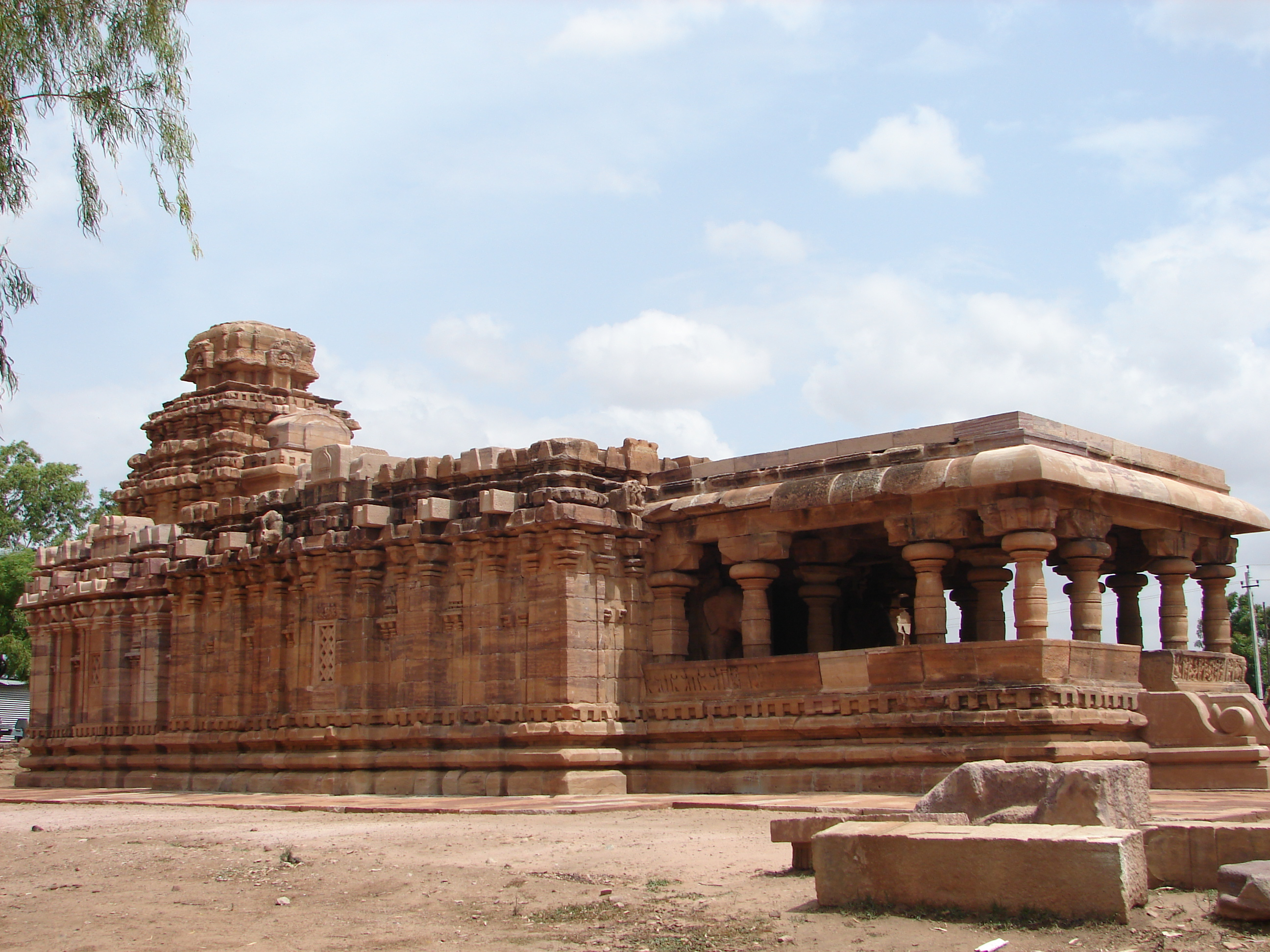
Jaina Narayana temple Pattadakal built by Rashtrakuta Amoghavarsha

Amoghavarsha was a devout Jain. His Jain affiliation was not a later development, historical evidence shows he was born into the Jain tradition and continued his family's legacy of Jain patronage. He was a disciple and close patron of the Digambar Acharya Jinasena, who served as royal advisor and spiritual guide. Under Acharya Jinasena’s influence, Amoghavarsha ruled for 64 years. He is credited with composing, along with Acharya Jinasena, the Kavirajamarga, the earliest known work of Kannada poetics. His reign is marked by generous patronage of Jain monks, scholars, and temples, notably at Manyakheta the Rashtrakuta capital.. Amoghavarsha also built some jain temples within the Ellora caves. According to the Kannada historical novel "Nrupatunga" by Ta. Ra. Su., his son Krishna II is also said to have learned under Acharya Jinasena. According to Historian Sadashiv Altekar, Amoghavarsha was so deeply moved by a sense of renunciation (vairagya) that he handed over the kingdom to Krishna II and spent his final days with Acharya Jinasena. It is also suggested that he may have even become a monk and ultimately taken Sallekhana (The Jain ritual of fasting to death).

Historian J.D.M. Derrett notes that though a Jain, he also extended Support to Hindu temples and allowed peaceful trade by Muslim merchants in his realm. The historians Chopra, Ravindran and Subrahmanian opine that Amoghavarsha was deeply influenced by Jainism, Although He also worshiped Hindu goddesses. like he made a donation to the Mahalakshmi Temple, Kolhapur, some interpret as saying he "cut his finger" as a sacrifice for the Mahalakshmi Temple, Kolhapur. However, this is a misinterpretation: the inscription uses the word "bali", which in context means "dana" (gift or donation), indicating he made a donation for the temple, likely to serve local needs. Blood sacrifice (rakta bali) was not a practice of Shramana religions like Jainism. The temple itself is believed to have originally been dedicated to Padmāvatī The Yakshini of Tirthankara Parshvanatha, It is said that during Amoghavarsha’s time the site was associated with Jain worship—particularly Yakshi Padmavati—and only later became strongly identified with the goddess Mahalaxmi.

== Culture and literature ==
Amoghavarsha’s court is also linked with the Jain Acharya "Gunabhadra" co-author of the "Mahapurana" and author of the "Prashnottara Ratna Malika", a didactic text in question-answer format. Another luminary of his era was the Jain mathematician Mahaviracharya, author of the "Ganita-Sara-Sangraha", a landmark treatise on arithmetic and algebra, dedicated to a Rashtrakuta king often identified as Amoghavarsha I. It is said that his father Govinda III supported Jain monks like "Virasena" and "Jinasena", under whom the famous Jain text "Dhavala" (a commentary on the Satkhandagama) was written. Work on the "Jayadhavala" was also initiated under them and completed by their disciples.

The Jain Narayana temple of Pattadakal, (a UNESCO World Heritage Site) a basadi at Konnur and the Neminatha Basadi at Manyakheta were built during his reign. His queen was "Asagavve". Famous among scholars during his time were Mahaviracharya, Virasena, Jinasena, Gunasena and Gunabhadra, "Shakatayan", and "Sri vijaya".

=== Praise by scholars and travelers ===
According to the "maṅgalācharaṇa" (auspicious invocation) of Mahaviracharya's "Gaṇita-sāra-saṅgraha": - "I bow to Śrīmaṇi-Nṛpatunga (Amoghavarṣa), the best among kings, the sole gem of merit and virtue among rulers, who showers pearls (of wisdom and generosity) like the elephant atop Mount Mandara pouring jewels for the garland of great kings". Mahaviracharya further extols him in another verse, portraying Amoghavarṣa as - "a ruler under whom the people are happy and the land yields abundant grain, with the blessing: "May the kingdom of Jain King Nripatunga Amoghavarsha ever increase far and wide".

The Arab traveler Sulaiman al-Tajir described Amoghavarsha I as one of the "four great kings of the world", highlighting his global stature during the 9th century. For his dharmic temperament, deep interest in fine arts and literature, and peace-loving nature, the historian Dr. R. S. Panchamukhi compared him to Emperor Ashoka and bestowed upon him the title "Ashoka of the South". Amoghavarsha also demonstrated profound admiration for the Kannada language, literature, and culture, as evidenced in the literary work Kavirajamarga, which he is believed to have co-authored or patronized.

== Writings ==
Amoghavarsha was a scholar in Kannada and Sanskrit literature. His own writing Kavirajamarga is a landmark literary work in the Kannada language and became a guide book for future poets and scholars for centuries to come. The Sanskrit writing Prashnottara Ratnamalika is said to have been written by Amoghavarsha I in his old age when he had distanced himself from the affairs of the state. However others argue that it may have been written by Vimalacharya.

There is a mention of several Kannada authors in his works who preceded him. Those who wrote in prose were Vimala, Udaya, Nagarjuna, Jayabandhu and Durvinita, whereas those who wrote in poetry were Sri vijaya, Kavisvara, Pandita, Chandra and Lokapala.
