= Harivaṃśapurāṇa =

Jain text

Information
- Religion: Jainism
- Author: Jinasena I
- Language: Sanskrit
- Period: 783 AD

Harivaṃśapurāṇa was composed by Acharya Jinasena I in 783 AD. It is divided into 66 cantos and contains 12,000 slokas. The book aims to narrate the life of Neminatha, the twenty-second Tirthankara in Jainism. According to the Jain sources, Krishna was the first cousin of Tirthankara Neminatha. Therefore, Krishna's adventures too occupy a significant portion of the book. Harivaṃśa Purāṇa suggests that Draupadi was married to only Arjuna, as opposed to Hindu traditional accounts which suggests that she was married to all the five Pandavas.

== Synopsis ==
In general, all Jaina Harivamśa narratives go far beyond what one might consider to be fitting for the Harivamśa, i.e. the story of Krishna and his relatives, or Mahabharata material. They consist of four larger parts: (1) Harivamśa, including the story of Krishna, his ancestors and progeny; (2) Nemicarita, the biography of the 22nd Tīrthankara, Krishna's cousin; (3) Pāndavacarita, containing the central narrative of the Mahabharata; and (4) Vasudeva-hindi, the narrative of the wanderings of Krishna's father Vasudeva, in reality being a Jaina version of the Brhatkathā in which the character of Prince Naravāhanadatta is replaced by Vasudeva.

True to the systematic requirements of a Jaina Purana, the first three chapters describe the narrative setting of Mahāvīra's samavasarana, where Shrenika enquires about the story of the Hari dynasty upon seeing Jitashatru, a monk of the Hari lineage, attaining kevalajñāna. Indrabhūti Gautama, the head of Mahāvīra's assembly, commences with an exposition of cosmology, chronology, and the rise of the Kulakaras (4–7). The last Kulakara fathers the first Jina, Rishabha, who continues the work of the Kulakaras, giving rise to the basic social and hierarchical structures, and installing professions and classes. He is also the founder of the ikshvākuvamśa, and further, upon his cousins, Nami and Vinami, he bestows vidyās, magical powers, and the land to establish their own dynasty, the vidyādharavamśa (8–10). This is followed by the stories of Bharata and Bāhubali, two sons of Rishabha, and founders of the Solar and the Lunar dynasty (11–12) respectively. In sarga 13 the Harivamśapurāna proper begins, with a sketch of history up to the tenth Jina, Śītalanātha, during whose time the Hari dynasty arises.

According to the Harivamśapurāna the harivamśa is named after a king, Hari, the first king of Campā, son of a Vidyādhara couple (14–15). Jinasena then briefly describes several generations of kings in the Hari dynasty, listing some of their extraordinary feats (16–17). The eighteenth sarga presents King Yadu in the Hari dynasty giving rise to the Yādava branch in Mathurā and introduces some of the characters known from their equivalents in the Mahabharata: Andhakavrishni and his ten sons (Daśārhas) and two daughters, Kuntī and Mādrī, Bhojakavrishni and his sons Ugrasena, Mahāsena and Devasena, and Jarāsandha, the king of Rājagriha. Andhakavrishni renounces the world after which his eldest son Samudravijaya becomes king. The youngest of the Daśārhas, the handsome Vasudeva, leaves the palace to roam the world for one hundred years. From sarga 19 onwards, twelve chapters are devoted to his adventures, the Vasudevahindi. With Vasudeva's return and marriage to Rohinī and the birth of Baladeva, we revert to the more traditional epic material (31–32). Sarga 33 introduces Kamsa, the son of Ugrasena who had been abandoned at birth and grew up in the home of Vasudeva. Together with Vasudeva he overthrows Simharatha for Jarāsandha, thus winning the hand of Jarāsandha's daughter, Jīvadyaśas. Hearing the story of his parentage Kamsa takes control of Mathurā and imprisons his father. He gives the hand of his sister Devakī to Vasudeva. One day Jīvadyaśas insults the ascetic Atimuktaka, who curses her, swearing that her husband and father will die at the hand of Devakī's seventh son. After a short doctrinal discourse, including the previous birth stories of the future Tīrthankara Nemi, Devakī's first six children are exchanged by the god Naigama for stillborns (34–35). The birth of the seventh child is announced by seven dreams, the standard narrative theme in the conception of a future Vāsudeva or Ardhacakravartin. Immediately after the birth Vasudeva and Baladeva interchange the baby boy with the daughter of the herdsman Nanda. The girl is disfigured by Kamsa, who thinks he can avoid death if she would be too ugly to get a husband. The boy, Krishna, grows up in the gokula where he survives several attacks of Kamsa (35–36). Kamsa challenges the cowherds to a wrestling match in Mathurā. Krishna and Baladeva take part and triumph, with Krishna ultimately killing Kamsa. Krishna is reunited with his biological parents and Ugrasena is reinstalled as the king of Mathurā. Jarāsandha wants to avenge the death of Kamsa, his son-in-law, and sends his son Kālayavana and his brother Aparājita after the Yādavas, but to no avail.

As a long interlude Jinasena here inserts the account of the conception, birth and consecration of the Tīrthankara Nemi, son of Samudravijaya, the eldest of the Daśārhas and cousin of Krishna (37–39).

Sarga 40 reverts to the story of Krishna, with Jarāsandha's next attack on the Yādavas. Following the instructions of an astrologer, Krishna decides to migrate to the west towards the ocean. The gods create an illusion of funeral pyres burning with the bodies of the Yādava armies, making Jarāsandha's camp believe that his enemies have committed suicide and abandon the pursuit. Krishna enters the coastal city of Dvāravatī built by Kubera (41). Following the intrigues of Nārada, Krishna marries Rukminī, his second queen after Satyabhāmā (42). The neighbouring king, Duryodhana, promises the hand of his firstborn daughter to Krishna's first son, born to either Rukminī or Satyabhāmā. Rukminī and Satyabhāmā give birth to a son simultaneously but Rukminī's child, Pradyumna, is by chance recognized as the eldest. However, a god seeking vengeance for insults suffered in a previous life kidnaps the boy and abandons him in Meghakūta where he grows up in a Vidyādhara family. Rukminī is devastated but Nārada comforts her with the promise of her son's return after sixteen years (43). Satyabhāmā's son Bhānu grows up in the palace and Krishna marries six other women (44).

One day the Pāndavas visit Dvāravatī. King Shrenika requests to hear their full story and Indrabhūti Gautama gives a condensed account of the Mahabharata story up to the great battle (45–46). It begins with a brief description of the kuruvamśa to which the Tīrthankaras Shānti, Kunthu and Ara belonged. After that Shāntanu, Dhritarāshtra, Pāndu, and their children, the Kauravas and the Pāndavas are introduced. After Pāndu's death the kingdom is divided equally between the Pāndavas and the Kauravas. Rivalry between the cousins soon leads to the attack on the Pāndavas' lives in the lacquer house from which the Pāndavas escape to live anonymously as hermits in the forest. After Draupadī's marriage to Arjuna – and to Arjuna alone – the Pāndavas give up their anonymity and return to Hāstinapura. After renewed conflict culminating in the game of dice and the subsequent exile, the Pāndavas spend eleven years in the forest and one year incognito at the court of Virāta. They return to Hāstinapura where they make every effort at peaceful coexistence but are forced to leave their home again to avoid war with their cousins. They head south and reach Dvāravatī where they each marry one of the Daśārhas' daughters.

After this concise sketch of the Pāndavas' past history the Harivamśapurāna takes us back to Pradyumna, who has now grown up to accomplish many heroic feats, much to the envy of his foster mother and brothers. Following some conflicts and subsequent reconciliation Nārada takes him back to Dvāravatī to rejoin his biological family. On the way Pradyumna raids the caravan that is accompanying Duryodhana's daughter to Dvāravatī, where she will marry Satyabhāmā's son Bhānu, and he steals the bride. Rukminī recognizes her son and Nārada introduces him to Krishna after which Pradyumna triumphantly enters Dvāravatī and marries Duryodhana's daughter (47). Sarga 48 describes the anecdotes of Pradyumna and his half brother Śamba, who is always taunting Satyabhāmā's younger son Subhānu. In total there are by then three and a half crores of princes in Dvāravatī.

Jinasena then inserts the story of Nanda's daughter who was mutilated by Kamsa (49). She grows up and, disgusted with the world, becomes a nun in the Vindhyas. There she is noticed by some tribal hunters on their way to attack a group of merchants. The hunters pay homage to her as a goddess. Immediately after they leave the nun is devoured by a tiger. When the hunters return, all they find of their goddess are three fingers in a pool of blood. They misinterpret this as a sign that the goddess demands blood and from then on they engage in the practice of sacrificing buffaloes, hence the origin of the Durgā cult.

In sarga 50 Jarāsandha one day hears that the Yādavas are alive and prospering in Dvāravatī. He immediately sends a messenger with a declaration of war. The Yādavas accept it and both parties agree to meet in Kuruksetra after six months. The following two sargas describe the great war between the Yādavas and their allies, including the Pāndavas, and Jarāsandha and his allies, among whom are the Kauravas. The Pāndavas gain victory over the Kauravas, who all renounce the material world to go and live as ascetics. In the ultimate battle Krishna, the Vāsudeva, kills Jarāsandha, the Prativāsudeva, with his cakra Sudarśana. After the war Krishna campaigns to conquer half of Bharata and triumphantly returns to Dvāravatī where he is crowned as Ardhacakravartin.

One day Draupadī fails to recognize Nārada and forgets to greet him. Spiteful as ever, Nārada entices King Padmanābha of Dhātakīkhanda, a continent lying beyond Jambūdvīpa, to kidnap her. Krishna and the Pāndavas set out to rescue her. They cross the ocean of salt surrounding Jambūdvīpa and reach Dhātakīkhanda, where they subdue Padmanābha's armies and are reunited with Draupadī. On their return home the Pāndavas, by way of a prank, hide the ferry crossing the Gangā so that Krishna himself has to carry his chariot, charioteer and horses across the river. When he hears that the Pāndavas are responsible for this he angrily banishes them to Mathurā in the south and installs Parīksita, Subhadrā's grandson, in Hāstinapura (54).

In sarga 55 we are briefly told how Aniruddha, Pradyumna's son, is kidnapped by the daughter of King Bāna. Aniruddha and his bride are rescued and brought back to Dvāravatī.

Then Jinasena picks up the biography of Nemi and the story of how he became a Tīrthankara (55–59). Krishna noticed that his young nephew had grown up to a man of unequalled force and becomes worried for his own sovereignty. He also arranges for Nemi to marry. Just before the wedding Nemi wanders around the park where he sees the crying animals lined up to be slaughtered for the wedding feast. He becomes filled with disgust for the world and decides to renounce. The gods come to honour him and take him to Uttarakuru where he begins his meditation. Nemi attains kevala and roams the land to preach to his followers. In sarga 60 Nemi narrates the previous birth stories of Krishna's wives. Devakī gives birth to another son, Gajakumāra, who, also on his wedding day, renounces the world. All the Daśārhas (except Vasudeva), Vasudeva's wives (except Devakī and Rohinī), and Krishna's daughters become mendicants.

Questioned by Krishna, Nemi foretells Dvāravatī's downfall (61). Twelve years later, as predicted, the city and all its inhabitants are burnt by a vengeful god, who, when in a former existence he was an ascetic named Dvīpāyana, was insulted by Dvāravatī's drunken young princes. Only Krishna and Baladeva escape the burning city alive. On their way south to the Pandavas Krishna rests under a tree while Baladeva goes to fetch some water. Jaratkumāra, Baladeva's and Krishna's half-brother, who, in order to avoid killing Krishna as Nemi had predicted, had left Dvāravatī twelve years earlier to live in the forest as a hunter, mistakes Krishna's foot for a deer and shoots him. Krishna dies and is reborn in the third hell. Jaratkumāra goes to the Pāndavas to bring them the news of Dvāravatī's downfall and Krishna's demise (62). Baladeva cannot accept Krishna's death and roams around carrying Krishna's corpse with him. A god, his charioteer in a previous life, brings him to his senses, upon which he renounces the world (63).

The Pāndavas install Jaratkumāra as their successor and visit Nemi, from whom they hear about their previous lives (64). Sarga 65 describes the nirvāna of Nemi and the liberation of the main characters. The Hari lineage is continued by Jaratkumāra. In the final sarga the genealogy of the Hari dynasty is enumerated up to Jitaśatru, the monk about whom Shrenika had requested to hear the whole story. Shrenika then returns home and Mahāvīra attains nirvāõa. The Harivamśapurāna ends with an account of Mahāvīra's lineage up to Caturmuni.

== See also ==
- Neminatha
- Krishna
- Balarama
- Jinasena

== Bibliography ==
- Punnāta Jinasena. Harivaṃśapurāṇa, ed. P. Jain, Kashi, 1962.
