= Krishna II =

Rashtrakuta emperor from 878 to 914

- Maharajadhiraja

Rashtrakuta Emperor
- Reign: c. 878 – c. 914
- Predecessor: Amoghavarsha
- Successor: Indra III
- Born: Manyakheta, Rashtrakuta Empire (modern day Karnataka, India)
- Died: c. 914; Manyakheta, Rashtrakuta Empire (modern day Karnataka, India)
- Consort: Mahadevi
- Issue: Jagattunga
- Father: Amoghavarsha
- Religion: Jainism; Hinduism

Krishna II (r. 878–914 CE), also known as Akālavarṣa, was the Rashtrakuta emperor from 878 to 914. He ascended the Rashtrakuta throne after the demise of his illustrious father Amoghavarsha Nrupatunga. His queen was a Haihaya princess of Chedi called Mahadevi. From the chronology of inscriptions that mention the name of this emperor, it seems Krishna II may have started to rule even during the lifetime of his father. The fact that Amoghavarsha in his last years renounced the affairs of the state in dharmic pursuits supports this claim. The reign of emperor Krishna II saw significant advances in literature, although in the affairs of expansion of the empire, his reign was mixed. During his reign he cultivated a matrimonial alliance with the Chedis to form military gains.

== Vengi affairs ==
His reign was one of mixed fortunes. He suffered some reversals against the Eastern Chalukyas ruled by King Gunaga Vijayaditya III whose commander pursued Krishna II to central India. After the death of Vijayaditya III, Krishna II continued hostilities against Chalukya Bhima I in 892 and succeeded in defeating him and taking him prisoner. However, Bhima I later freed himself and pushed back the Rashtrakutas from Vengi and crowned himself king. A few years later, Krishna II suffered two more defeats at the hands of the Vengi Chalukyas at Niravadyapura and Peruvanguru. However other sources claim Krishna II conquered Andhra.

== Deccan and northern affairs ==
Krishna II defeated Bhoja I of Gurjara Prathihara dynasty of Gujarat, merging the Lata line (Gujarat) of Rashtrakutas to bring it under his direct rule from Manyakheta. He defeated the kingdoms of Banga, Kalinga, Magadha. It is claimed his kingdom extended from the Ganges river in the north to Cape Comorin in the south. He held titles such as Akalavarsha and Shubatunga.

== Religion ==
Krishna II is sometimes described in inscriptions and later accounts as supporting Jainism Along with Hinduism. and maintaining close ties with Jain institutions established by his father Amoghavarsha I. Epigraphic records indicate grants and patronage for Jain monks and temples, Being Jain by faith while also patronizing other religions like Hinduism.

Lokasena, a disciple of Acharya Gunabhadra, wrote a "praśasti" in which he mentions that King Akālavarṣa (Krishna II) was ruling during his time, using the expression "Śaka-nṛpa-kālābhyantara" to date the event. This Akālavarṣa is identified with Krishna II of the Rashtrakuta dynasty. During his rule, Jain festivals called "Śrī Pañchamī", associated with "Nandīśvara", were observed in the king's presence. Historian A. S. Altekar states that Krishna III (Akālavarṣa) was a student of Acharya Gunasena, suggesting a direct intellectual and religious connection between the Rashtrakuta king and Jain spiritual leadership.

== Tamil politics ==
His daughter had married the Chola king Aditya I. With this the emperor had hoped to achieve influence in the Tamil country. After the death of Aditya I, instead of his Rashtrakuta lineage son Kannara-devan ascending the throne, Parantaka I became the Chola monarch. Krishna II then invaded the Chola realm with the help of his feudatories, the Banas and the Vaidumbas rulers, hoping to force the issue. He failed to consolidate his influence on the Cholas. The Rashtrakutas suffered a defeat in the battle of Vallala at the hands of Cholas under Parantaka in 916.

== Notes ==
Preceded by Amoghavarsha I	Rashtrakuta Emperor; 878–914	Succeeded by Indra III
