= Mahapurana (Jainism) =

Jain text (8-9th century CE)

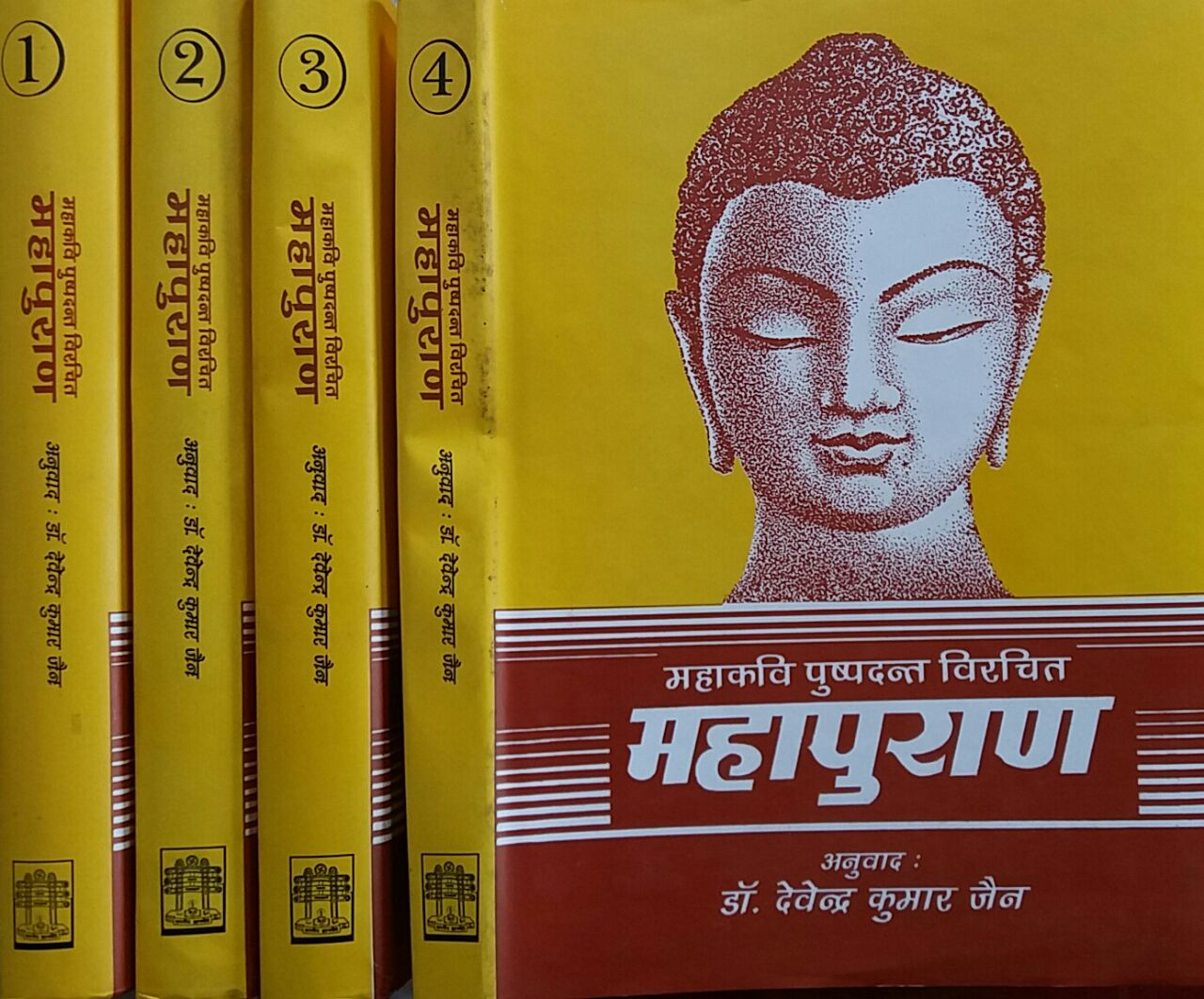
- Mahapurana Authored by Acharya Jinasena
- Author: Jinasena and Gunabhadra
- Original title: महापुराण (Mahāpurāṇa)
- Language: Sanskrit
- Subject: Jainism, Jain cosmology, Tirthankaras
- Genre: Religious epic, Puranic literature
- Published: 8-9th century CE
- Publication place: Rashtrakuta Kingdom

Mahapurana (महापुराण) or Trishashthilkshana Mahapurana is a major Jain text composed largely by Acharya Jinasena during the rule of Rashtrakuta ruler Amoghavarsha and completed by his pupil Gunabhadra in the 9th century CE. Mahapurana consists of two parts. The first part is Ādi purāṇa written by Acharya Jinasena in Sanskrit. The second part is Uttarapurana which is the section completed by Jinasena's disciple Gunabhadra.

== Description ==
The Trishashthilkshana Mahapurana was composed by Jinasena, Gunabhadra in 9th century CE.

Mahapurana consists of two parts. The first part is Ādi purāṇa written by Acharya Jinasena. The second part is Uttarpurana which is the section composed by Gunabhadra. Adipurana contains about 37 chapters where as Uttarapurana contains about 65 chapters. The completed and edited text was released by Lokasena, pupil of Gunabhadra in a celebration at Bankapura in the court of Vira-Bankeyarasa in 898 CE. The first 42 Parvans of this text were written by Jinasena, while remaining 34 Parvans were composed by Gunabhara.

This text gives an encyclopedic account of the Jain tradition. The text is widely quoted. A widely used quote in Carl Sagan's Cosmos, written in the Mahapurana (Chap 4, verses 16–31, 38–40) is:

"Some foolish men declare that a Creator made the world. The doctrine that the world was created is ill-advised, and should be rejected. If God created the world, where was He before creation? . . .How could God have made the world without any raw material? If you say He made this first, and then the world, you are faced with an endless regression . . . Know that the world is uncreated, as time itself is, without beginning and end. And it is based on the principles . . . – The Mahapurana (The Great Legend), Jinasena (India, ninth century)",

A number of Jain and non-Jain texts have been influenced by the Mahapurana. Mahapurana was the model for Saiva Siddhanta Periyapuranam which gives biographies of the 63 individuals.

== See also ==
- Jainism
- Jinasena
- Tirthankara
