= Guṇabhadra (Jain monk) =

8th/9th-century CE Indian Jain monk

Acharya Gunabhadra
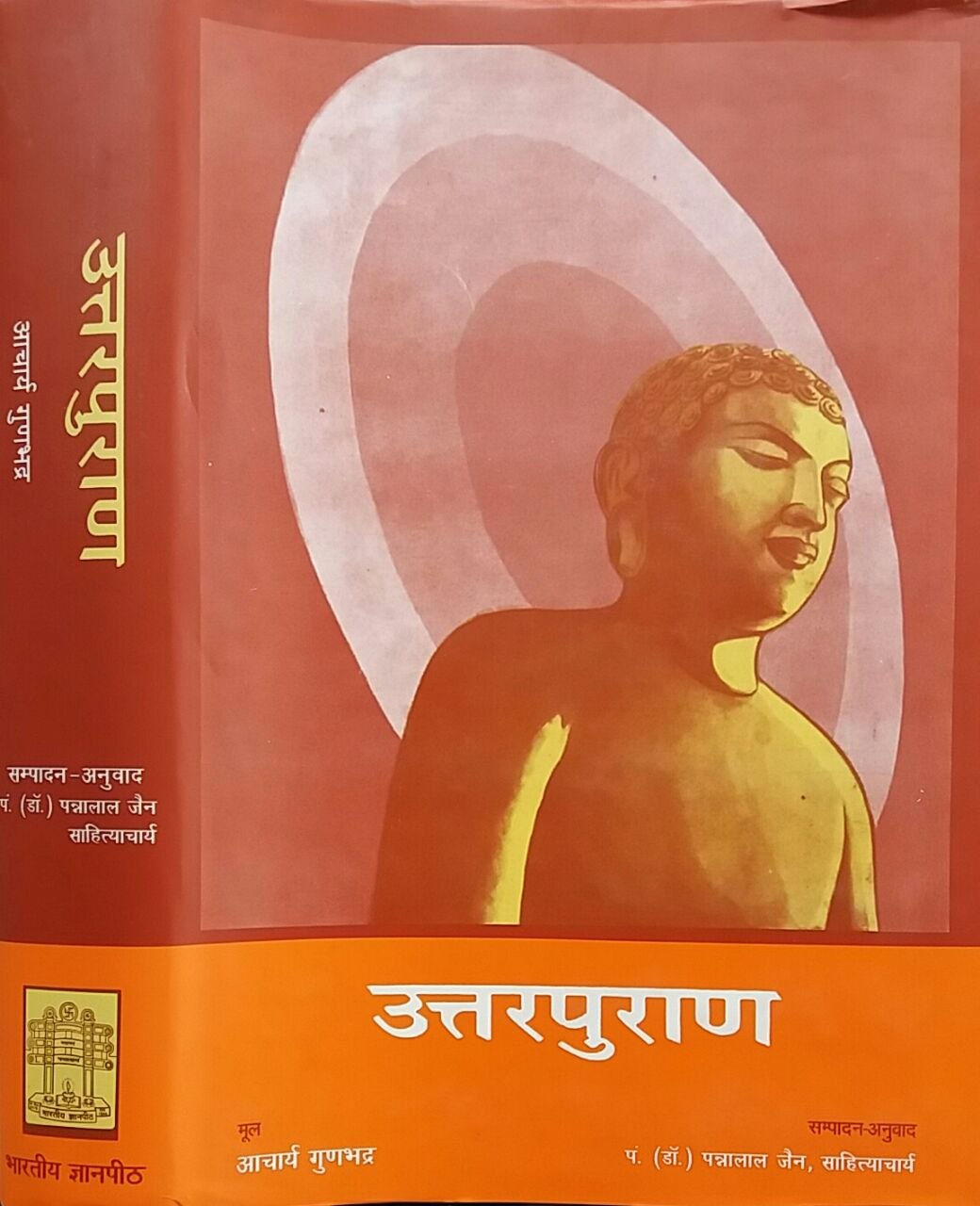

Personal life
- Era: 9th–10th century CE
- Notable work: Uttarapurana (co-author of the Mahapurana)

Religious life
- Religion: Jainism
- Sect: Digambara

Religious career
- Teacher: Jinasena, Gunasena
- Disciples: Lokasena

Acharya Guṇabhadra (9th–10th century CE) was a Digambar Jain monk and scholar. He is known as the co-author of the Mahapurana, a major Sanskrit epic of Jain literature. A disciple of Acharya Jinasena, He is also noted to have studied under Acharya Gunasena, one of the senior disciples of Jinasena. he is credited with continuing and completing the Jain narrative tradition during the Rashtrakuta period.

== Life ==
Guṇabhadra was associated with the Digambar tradition and was active during the later part of the Rashtrakuta period. He was a direct disciple of Acharya Jinasena, who composed the Adipurana and part of the Mahapurana. After Jinasena’s Nirvana, Gunabhadra completed the remaining portion of the epic, the Uttarapurana.

== Works ==
=== Uttarapurana ===
Guṇabhadra is credited with the authorship of the Uttarapurana, which constitutes the second half of the Jain Mahapurana. While his teacher Acharya Jinasena composed the Adipurana, Guṇabhadra completed the narrative with the Uttarapurāṇa, covering the lives of the remaining Tīrthaṅkaras. The text is regarded as an important source for Jain mythology, ethics, and hagiography.

The combined Mahapurana (Adi + Uttara) became a model for later Jain Purāṇic literature and had a lasting impact on Jain culture in both Sanskrit and Kannada traditions.

== Legacy ==
Guṇabhadra is noted for his literary contributions, particularly his role in preserving Jain doctrine through narrative texts. He is credited with the authorship of the Uttarapurana, which, together with the Ādi Purāṇa, constitutes the Mahāpurāṇa, an important work in the Digambara Jain tradition.

== See also ==
- Jainism in Karnataka
- Mahapurana (Jainism)
- Uttarapurana

== Bibliography ==
- Jaini, Padmanabh S. (1979). The Jaina Path of Purification. Berkeley: University of California Press. ISBN 9780520034945. OCLC 4779344.
- Cort, John E. (2010). Framing the Jina: Narratives of Icons and Idols in Jain History. New York: Oxford University Press. ISBN 9780195385021. OCLC 316835730.
- Dundas, Paul (2002). The Jains (2nd ed.). London: Routledge. ISBN 0-203-39827-0. OCLC 252916273.
- Upadhye, A. N. (1965). "Jinasena and his Literary Contributions". Jaina Sahitya aur Itihasa. Mysore: Mysore University Publications. OCLC 3115715.
- Nagarajaiah, Hampa (1999). Jainism in Southern Karnataka. Bangalore: Sapna Book House. OCLC 45166444.
