= Kumsi =

- village
- Location in Karnataka, India Kumsi (India)
- Coordinates: 14°04′N 75°24′E
- Country: India
- State: Karnataka
- District: Shivamogga
- Talukas: Shivamogga

Population
  - Total: 6,468

Languages
  - Official: Kannada
- Time zone: UTC+5:30 (IST)

Kumsi is a village in the southern state of Karnataka, India. It is located in the Shivamogga taluk of Shivamogga district in Karnataka.

== Demographics ==
As of 2001 India census, Kumsi had a population of 6042 with 3069 males and 2973 females.

== See also ==
- Shimoga
- Districts of Karnataka
