= Jinasena =

8th/9th-century CE Indian Jain monk

Acharya Shri Jinasena
- जिनसेन
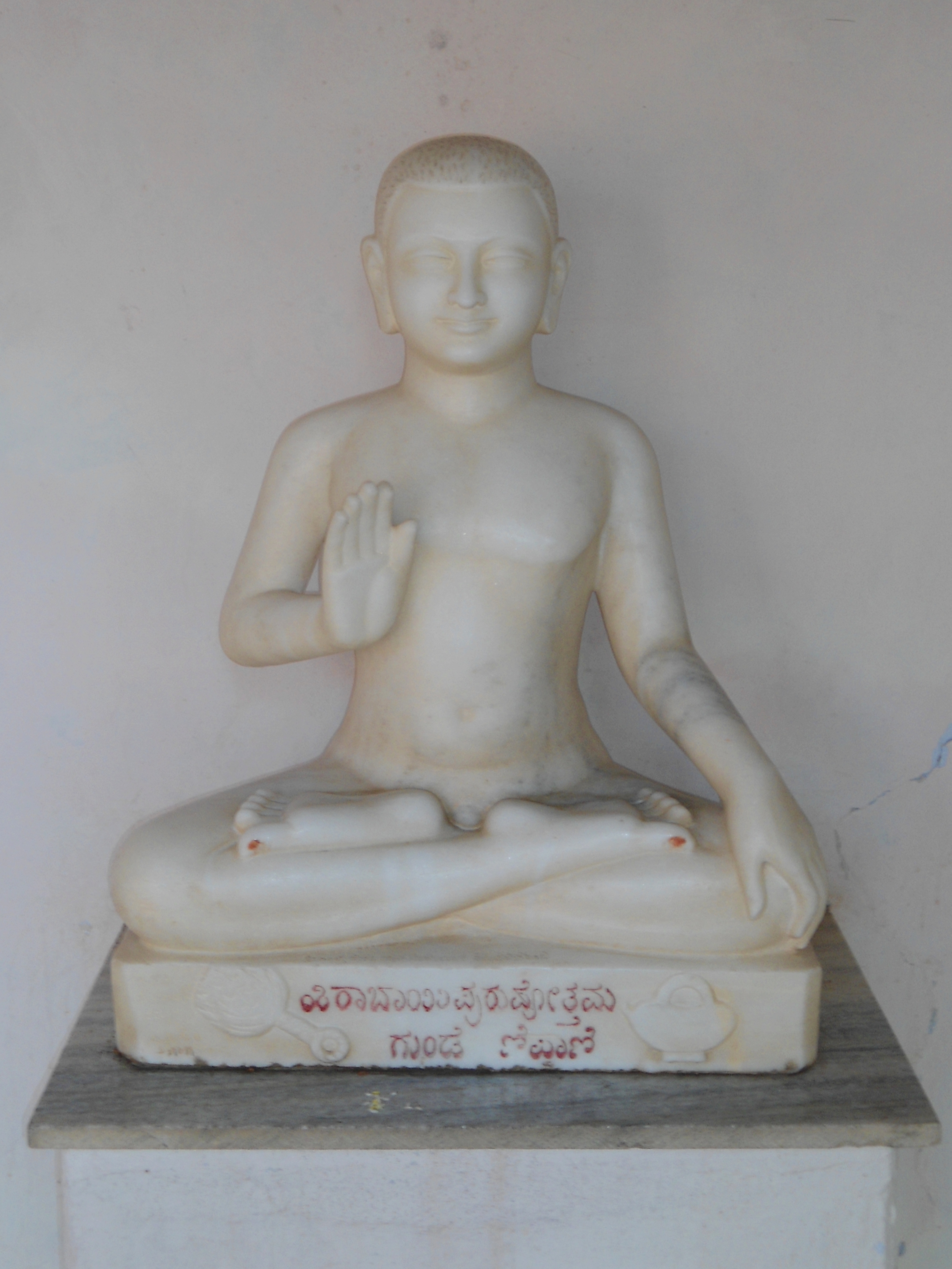
- Image of Acharya Jinasena

Personal life
- Born: 770
- Died: 850
- Notable work(s): "Adipurana", "Mahapurana" And "Harivamsa Purana"

Religious life
- Religion: Jainism
- Sect: Digambar
- Initiation: by Virasena

Religious career
- Predecessor: Virasena
- Successor: Gunabhadra
- Disciples: Gunasena Amoghavarsha

Acharya Jinasena (c. 770–850 CE) was a prominent Digambar Jain monk, scholar, and religious leader in 8th-century India He is widely known for composing the Adipurana and Mahapurana, considered the foundational texts of Jain Sanskrit literature, and for serving as the royal spiritual advisor to the Rashtrakuta emperor Amoghavarsha. He also finished the Jaidhavala commentary started by his guru Virasena. He is distinct from the earlier Jinasena, the author of Harivamsa Purana, who belonged to the Punnata Sangh, another branch of Digambar Jainism which describes the Jain tradition about Shri Krishna corresponding to the Hindu tradition given in the epic Mahabharata.

== Life ==
Acharya Jinasena was a 8/9th-century CE Jain scholar who belonged to the Panchastupanvaya. He was a disciple of Virasena, under whom he received training in Jain doctrine and scriptural interpretation. After Virasena's death, Jinasena continued his teacher’s scholarly tradition and expanded the literary scope of Jainism in southern India. He narrated the Jain tradition that Rishabhanatha first taught humanity how to extract sugarcane juice and that the fire by itself was not divine.

He became a central religious figure during the reign of Amoghavarsha, the powerful Rashtrakuta monarch, and held the position of rajaguru (royal spiritual preceptor). His presence at court had a lasting influence on the religious orientation of the Deccan region.

== Literary Contributions ==
=== Adi Purana ===
Jinasena's most celebrated work is the Adipurana, a Sanskrit epic (महाकाव्य, mahākāvya) that narrates the life of the first Tirthankara, Rishabhanatha, and his sons, Bharata and Bahubali. The text emphasizes Jain ethical ideals such as non-violence (अहिंसा, ahimsa), renunciation (त्याग, tyaga), and spiritual liberation (मोक्ष, moksha).

This work served as the literary model for the 10th-century Kannada poet Pampa, who composed a vernacular version of the Adipurana, helping spread Jain values through regional literature.

=== Harivamsha Purana ===
The authorship of the Harivamsa Purana is sometimes attributed to Jinasena, though some scholars credit his disciple Gunabhadra. The text deals with the Jain reinterpretation of Hindu mythological figures, especially Krishna, from a non-theistic and karmic perspective.

== Relationship with King Amoghavarsha ==
Jinasena held great influence over the Rashtrakuta emperor Amoghavarsha who was a devout Jain ruler and was brought up in a Jain ashram (monastery), and according to tradition, began his daily court duties each morning by offering salutations in the direction of the monastery of his guru Jinasena. His reign is noted for religious tolerance, Jain patronage, and the flourishing of Jain temple architecture in the Deccan. Amoghavarsha built some jain temples within the Ellora caves. Jinasena’s guidance is believed to have shaped the king’s pious lifestyle and his long, culturally rich reign of 64 years.

After ruling the Rashtrakuta kingdom successfully for 64 years, Amoghavarsha is said to have renounced worldly life (vairagya), handing over the throne to his son Krishna II. He spent his final years in spiritual retreat under the guidance of his guru, Acharya Jinasena. Some scholars suggest that after renouncing royal life, he may have even become a Jain monk and ultimately taken Sallekhana (the Jain ritual of fasting to death).

== Legacy ==
Jinasena’s contributions left a lasting impact on the Digambar tradition. His works became central to Jain doctrinal education, and his spiritual lineage continued through his disciple Gunabhadra, with whom he co-authored parts of the Mahapurana. His role in shaping Jain kingship ideology during the Rashtrakuta period is also seen as pivotal in the political legitimization of Jain monastic influence.

Jinasena had prohibited the use of meat, honey and other similar materials in Jain rituals due to their connection with violence. He is said to have introduced a conduct-based counterpart to the birth-based dvijas (twice-born) found in traditional Brahmanism. Padmanabh Jaini claims:

The rise among Digambaras of a class of "Jaina brahmans," individuals entrusted with care of the temples and the performance of elaborate rituals, was noted earlier, in Chapter VII. Whether this class originated, as Jinasena suggests, with a group of ordinary laymen who were on the basis of great merit or spiritual advancement appointed to such positions-or perhaps with a group of traditional brahmans who were converted to Jainism-we cannot be sure. It is clear, however, that the Jaina-brahmans eventually developed into a caste nearly as rigid as its Hindu counterpart; membership became strictly hereditary, and the range of rituals requiring the "supervision" of one of these "specialists" was greatly expanded. Faithful Digambaras in the south even today regard Jaina-brahmans as descendants of those honored by Bharata at the beginning of human civilization; Hindu brahmans are of course labeled "renegades" or "apostates," brahmans who have "fallen away from the true path." Thus the Jainas converted the varņa system into what was for them an acceptable form. The role of theistic crea- tion was eliminated, and the existence of a class of "spiritually superior laymen" analogous to the Hindu brahmans was justified on the basis of conduct, rather than of some irrevocable cosmic order. This second accomplishment was perhaps most important, for it allowed the community to have its own secular "priests" while still rejecting the supposed supremacy of the traditional brahman caste.

He prohibited the use of sacred thread by artisans, dancers and shudras but allowed them to wear dhoti. He preached the importance of Dāna (charity) for Jain households.

Jinasena's lineage started with Chandrasena who initiated Aryanandi. Aryanandi initiated Virasena and Jayasena. Virasena initiated six disciples who were Dasharayguru, Jinasena, Vinayasena, Shripal, Padmasena and Devasena. Dasharayguru and Jinasena initiated Gunabhadra who later initiated Lokasena. Vinayasena initiated Kumarasena who started the Kashtha Sangha.

== Works ==
Amongst other works he authored the encyclopedic Adipurana (included in the Mahapurana) and Uttarapurana (which was completed by his pupil Gunabhadra).

Mahapurana is the source of the famous quote, used by Carl Sagan and many others:

Some foolish men declare that creator made the world. The doctrine that the world was created is ill advised and should be rejected. If God created the world, where was he before the creation? If you say he was transcendent then and needed no support, where is he now? No single being had the skill to make the world - for how can an immaterial god create that which is material? How could God have made this world without any raw material? If you say that he made this first, and then the world, you are faced with an endless regression. If you declare that this raw material arose naturally you fall into another fallacy, For the whole universe might thus have been its own creator, and have arisen quite naturally. If God created the world by an act of his own will, without any raw material, then it is just his will and nothing else—and who will believe this silly nonsense? If he is ever perfect and complete, how could the will to create have arisen in him? If, on the other hand, he is not perfect, he could no more create the universe than a potter could. If he is form-less, action-less and all-embracing, how could he have created the world? Such a soul, devoid of all modality, would have no desire to create anything. If he is perfect, he does not strive for the three aims of man, so what advantage would he gain by creating the universe? If you say that he created to no purpose because it was his nature to do so, then God is pointless. If he created in some kind of sport, it was the sport of a foolish child, leading to trouble. If he created because of the karma of embodied beings [acquired in a previous creation] He is not the Almighty Lord, but subordinate to something else. If out of love for living beings and need of them he made the world, why did he not take creation wholly blissful free from misfortune? If he were transcendent he would not create, for he would be free: Nor if involved in transmigration, for then he would not be almighty. Thus the doctrine that the world was created by God makes no sense at all, And God commits great sin in slaying the children whom he himself created. If you say that he slays only to destroy evil beings, why did he create such beings in the first place? Good men should combat the believer in divine creation, maddened by an evil doctrine. Know that the world is uncreated, as time itself is, without beginning or end, and is based on the [seven building block] principles, life and the rest. Uncreated and indestructible, it endures under the compulsion of its own nature.

[from Barbara Sproul, Primal Myths (San Francisco; Harper Row, 1979), 192].

He also wrote the Dharmashastra, a lawbook for laymen.

== See also ==
- Devardhigani Kshamashraman
- Hemachandra
- Hiravijaya
