= Ādi purāṇa =

9th-century Sanskrit poem by the Jainist monk Jinasena

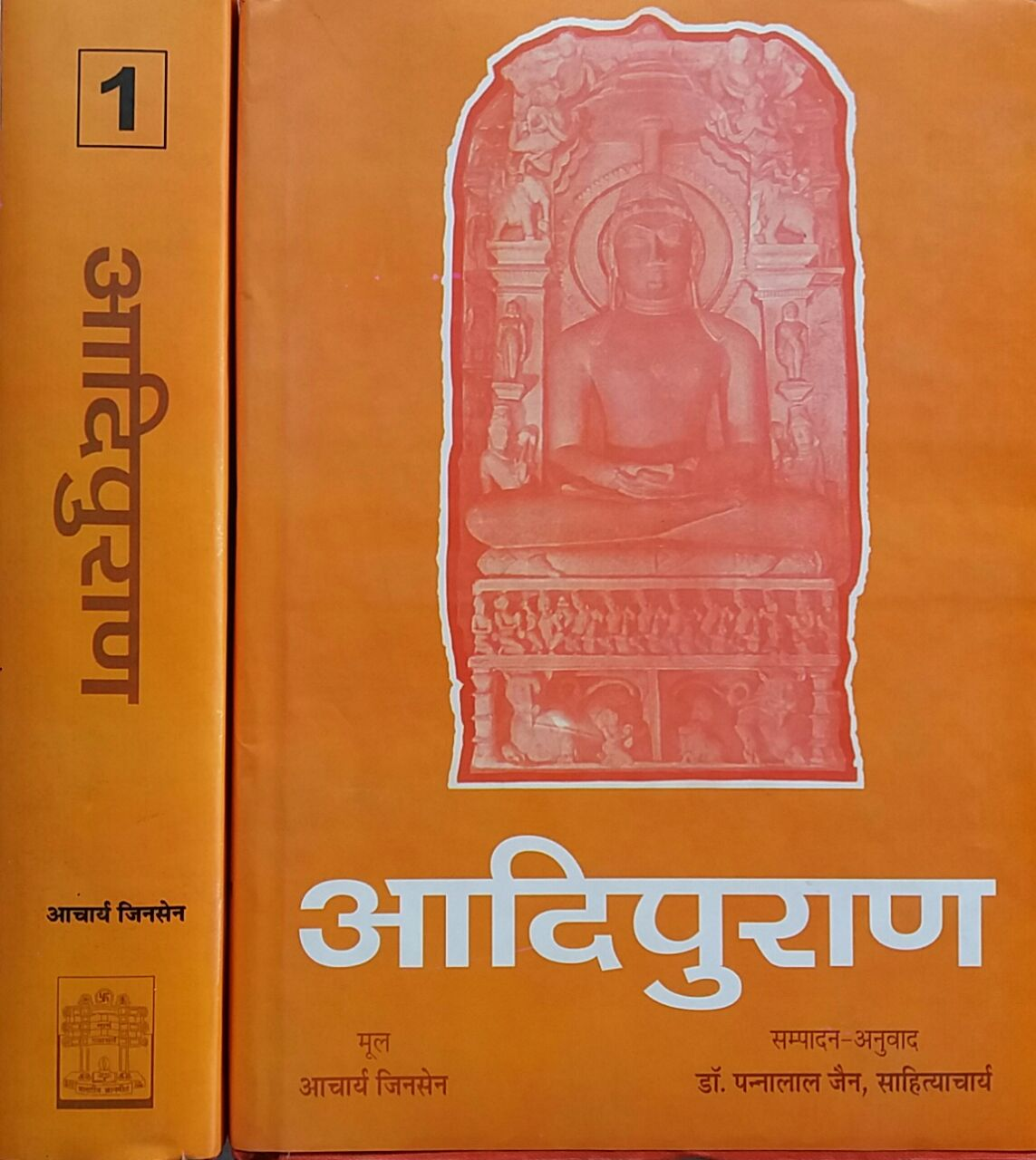
- Ādi purāṇa

Information
- Religion: Jainism
- Author: Jinasena
- Language: Sanskrit
- Period: 9th century CE

Ādi purāṇa is a 9th-century CE Sanskrit poem composed by Jinasena, a Digambara monk. It deals with the life of Rishabhanatha, the first Tirthankara.

== History ==
Adi Purana was composed by Jinasena (a Digambara monk) as a Sanskrit poem praising the life of first Tirthankara, Rishabhanatha. According to Jain tradition, it was composed in 9th century CE.

== Content ==
The work focusses in his own unique style the pilgrimage of a soul to perfection and attainment of mukti. In the work, the struggle for power and control over the entire world of two brothers Bharata and Bahubali, sons of Rishabhadeva. While Bahubali wins, he renounces the worldly pursuits in favor of his brother. Many Jaina Puranas of the Middle Ages found a role model in this work.

=== Famous quote ===
A famous quote from Adi Purana is-

By birth are all men equal unto one another; but they differ in respect of the progress they might make on the spiritual path.

== Kannada version ==
A 10th-century Kannada text written in Champu style, a mix of prose and verse, dealing with the ten lives of the first tirthankara, Adinatha in sixteen cantos. This work is known to be the first work of Kannada poet Adikavi Pampa (941 CE). It is based on the original Sanskrit version by Jinasena acharya.

A court poet of Chalukya king Arikesari II, a Rashtrakuta feudatory, he is most known for his epics, Vikramarjuna Vijaya (Pampa Bharata) and Adipurana, both written in Champu style, which he created and served as the model for all future works in the Kannada. The works of Jain writers Adikavi Pampa, Sri Ponna and Ranna, collectively called the "three gems of Kannada literature", heralded the age of classical Kannada in the 10th century, the Medieval Kannada literature.

== See also ==
- Mahapurana (Jainism)
