= Index of Jainism-related articles =

Alphabetical listing of Jainism related topics

This article contains the index of articles related to Jainism.

What links here is a special page for finding related articles (it is not entirely accurate though, enter Jainism for example, and then verify context by searching for "Jain" within any article linked there). Otherwise, section signs next to index entries indicate pages of links that serve as expanded sections (or could be added here individually). Book sources may also be included, essentially as a separate list type of article that is generated for the ISBN of each publication related to this topic. Jainism is characterized by diverse points of view, which such an index might reflect.

== A ==
- The A to Z of Jainism (ISBN 9780810863378)
- ABC of Jainism (ISBN 9788176280006)
- Abhinandananatha (4th Tirthankara)
- Abhisheka (ritual)
- Ācārāṅga Sūtra (book)
- Ācārāṅga Sūtra and Kalpa Sutra (ISBN 9788183291439)
- Acharya (preceptor)
- Adipurana (poem)
- Adipurana (vol 1: ISBN 9788126316045, vol 2: ISBN 9788126309221)
- Afterlife (concept)
- Ahimsa (virtue)
- Ahimsa Award
- Ahimsa Statue
- Ajitanatha (2nd Tirthankara)
- Ajnana (ancient Indian philosophy)
- Akasha (aether)
- Altruism (selflessness)
- Ancient art
- Ancient economic thought
- Ancient history (of religion and philosophy)
- Ancient philosophy
- Anantanatha (14th Tirthankara)
- Anekantavada (doctrine)
- Animal shelter
- Animal welfare
- Anointing (ritual)
- Antakrddaasah (text)
- Anuttaraupapatikadasah (text)
- Antarikṣa Pārśvanātha Tīrtha
- Aparigraha (virtue)
- Aranatha (18th Tirthankara)
- Arithmetic
- Aryika (nun)
- Asceticism (lifestyle)
- List of Jain ascetics
- List of Digambar Jain ascetics
- Ashoka (historical figure)
- Ashtamangala (symbols)
- Asia (continent)
- Asiatic Society of Mumbai (holdings)
- Asteya (virtue)
- Astika and nastika (propositions)
- Atomism (theory)
- Aura (paranormal)
- Ayodhya (city)

== B ==
- Babri Masjid (mosque)
- Badami cave temples
- Beef (religious prohibitions)
- Bhajan (music)
- Bhaktamara Stotra (prayer)
- Bhaktamar Stotra: The Song of Salvation (ISBN 9788190082396)
- Bhakti (devotion)
- Bhakti movement
- Bhattaraka (preceptor)
- Bhavana (tenet)
- Bhavyata (quality)
- Binary logarithm (mathematics)
- Biocentrism (ethics)
- Blind men and an elephant (parable)
- Bombay mix (snack)
- Bombay Presidency (history)
- Brahmacharya (vow)
- Brahmi script
- Brahmin (ascription)
- Brahmanism
- Brooms in religion

== C ==
- Caste system in India
- Cattle in religion and mythology
- Cattle slaughter in India
- Cavalry (history)
- Celibacy (vow)
- Champat Rai Jain (writer)
- Chamunda (goddess)
- Chandraprabha (8th Tirthankara)
- Chastity (comparative)
- Clairvoyance
- Cloth filter
- Clothing
- Communities
- Compassion
- Consecration (ceremony)
- Conceptions of God
- Cosmography
- Creator deity (comparative)
- Cremation (convention)
- Criticism of Jainism
- Cross (comparative)
- Cult image
- Culture and menstruation

== D ==
- Dashlakshan Dharma (festival)
- Death (concept)
- Demographics of the world
- Deep ecology (philosophy)
- Deity (comparative)
- Detachment (philosophy)
- Deva (celestial being)
- Dharma (religion)
- Dharmanatha (15th Tirthankara)
- Dhimmi (status)
- Dialectic (method)
- Digambara monk
- Diwali (festival)
- Dreams (auspicious)

== E ==
- East Indies
- Eastern philosophy
- Eastern religions
- Ecopsychology
- Ecospirituality
- Elemental (being)
- Ellora Caves
- Mircea Eliade (historian of religion)
- Encyclopaedia of Jainism (30 volumes ISBN 9788126106912)
- Encyclopedia of Jain Religion (11 volumes ISBN 9788188658848)
- Entheogen (psychoactive substance)
- Epic poetry
- Epigraphy (inscriptions)
- Jacob Epstein (sculptor)
- Eternal return (concept)
- Ethics of Jainism
- Ethics in religion
- Jainism in Europe
- Problem of Evil
- Existence of God

== F ==
- Fasting
- Fasting in Jainism
- Jain Festivals
- Ficus (fig tree)
- Ficus religiosa
- Five Thieves (foibles)
- Flag
- Flat Earth
- Flavor (dietary restrictions)
- Food and drink prohibitions
- Forgiveness
- Fraction (mathematics)
- Freedom of religion
- Fruitarianism

== G ==
- Ganadhara (disciple)
- Gandhism
- Garlic (spiritual and religious uses)
- Gelatin (dietary restrictions)
- Gender and religion
- Giant (mythology)
- Eric Gill (sculpture)
- Glossary of Hinduism terms
- Glossary of philosophy
- Glossary of spirituality terms
- Glossary of the Tribes and Castes of the Punjab and North-West Frontier Province
- Jain Gods (template)
- Golden Rule
- Green Man (motif)
- Growth of religion (statistic)
- Gunasthana (levels of virtue)
- Guru (preceptor)
- Gurukula (school)
- Jain Gurus (template)
- Guru Purnima (festival)
- Guru–shishya tradition

== H ==
- Hagiography (religious biography)
- Hair removal
- Haribhadra (author)
- Hexagram (shape)
- Himalayas (mountain range)
- Hindi literature
- Hindu (semantics)
- Hindu law (historical term)
- History of Ahmedabad
- History of alcoholic drinks
- History of art
- History of Asian art
- History of atheism
- History of Bankura district
- History of Bareilly
- History of Bengal
- History of Bihar
- History of Buddhism
- History of chemistry
- History of combinatorics
- History of Delhi
- History of education in the Indian subcontinent
- History of games
- History of Goa
- History of Gujarat
- History of the Hindu–Arabic numeral system
- History of Hinduism
- History of Hindustani
- History of human sexuality
- History of Jainism
- History of Jainism (category)
- History of Jaipur
- History and culture of Kaviyoor
- History of Karnataka
- History of Kerala
- History of large numbers
- History of metallurgy in South Asia
- History of Mymensingh
- History of Odisha
- History of Pakistan
- History of Patna
- History of Rajasthan
- History of religions
- History of religions (template)
- History of religious pluralism
- History of the Republic of India
- History of science and technology in the Indian subcontinent
- History of South Asian cuisine
- History of South India
- History of Tamil Nadu
- History of Udaipur
- History of vegetarianism
- History of Wayanad
- Human history
- Holiday (religious)
- Homa (ritual)
- Jainism in Hong Kong
- House temple (shrine)
- Hoysala architecture
- Human sacrifice
- Humanities (religion)
- Hunting

== I ==
- Idolatry (devotional)
- Immortality
- Impalement in myth and art
- Index of Buddhism-related articles
- Index of Eastern philosophy articles
- Index of ethics articles
- Index of philosophy articles (A–C)
- Index of philosophy articles (D–H)
- Index of philosophy articles (I–Q)
- Index of philosophy articles (R–Z)
- Index of philosophy of religion articles
- Index of religion-related articles
- India
- Arts and entertainment in India
- Culture of India
- Demographics of India
- History of India
- Jainism in India
- Names of India
- Outline of India
- Indian art
- Indian astronomy
- Indian classical music
- Indian company law
- Indian cuisine
- Indian epic poetry
- Indian literature
- Indian mathematics
- Indian Penal Code
- Indian people
- Indian philosophy
- Indian religions
- Indian rock-cut architecture
- Indology
- Indomania
- Indra (mythology)
- Infinity (philosophy)
- Ink (history)
- Institute of Jainology > JAINpedia (project)
- International Journal of Jaina Studies
- Introspection (pratikraman)
- Irreligion in India
- Itihasa (tradition)

== J ==
- Jade
- Jai Jinendra (greeting)
- Jain Agamas (original texts)
- Jain Bunt (community)
- Jain cosmology
- Jain Desi khana (cookbook ISBN 9788189491215)
- Jain epistemology
- Jain monasticism
- Jain philosophy
- The Jain Saga (3 volumes ISBN 9788190815703)
- Jain Sculpture
- Jain terms and concepts
- Jainism (categories)
- Jainism (template)
- Jainism (topic)
- Jainism Topics (template)
- Jainism in Japan
- Religion in Japan (Jainakyo)
- Jainism and non-creationism
- List of Jains
- The Jains (ISBN 9780415266062)
- Jambudvipa (placename)
- Janna (poet)
- Japa (repetition)
- Jinvani (message)
- Jiva (self)
- Jizya (tax)

== K ==
- Kalpasutra (book)
- Kalpa Sutra of Bhadrabahu Svami (ISBN 9788120808560)
- Kalpavriksha (divine tree)
- Kamandalu (pot)
- Kannada (language)
- Karma
- Karma in Jainism
- Karuna (compassion)
- Kashaya (passion)
- Kathmandu (city)
- Kevala Jnana (omniscience)
- Killing of animals
- Kiss (history)
- Khajuraho Group of Monuments
- Krishna (legend)
- Kunthunatha (17th Tirthankara)

== L ==
- Lake Manasarovar
- Lakshmi (deity)
- Languages
- Indo-Aryan languages
- Leather
- Lesya (color karma)
- Library of Congress Classification (1300–1380)
- Life Force: The World of Jainism (ISBN 9780875730806)
- Linguistic history of the Indian subcontinent
- Lipi (writing system)
- List of Amar Chitra Katha comics
- List of animal rights advocates
- List of Asian cuisines
- List of Bhairava temples
- List of buildings and structures
- List of contemporary ethnic groups
- List of converts to Hinduism
- List of countries by cremation rate
- List of creation myths
- List of cultural heritage sites in Sindh
- List of diets
- List of epics in the Kannada language
- List of ethics journals
- List of ethnic religions
- List of festivals in Nepal
- List of flag names
- List of flags by color combination
- List of founders of religious traditions
- List of Indian government agencies
- List of Indian inventions and discoveries
- List of Indian organisations in Singapore
- List of inventions and discoveries of the Indus Valley Civilisation
- List of Karnataka literature
- List of largest monoliths
- List of legendary creatures (H)
- List of legendary creatures (P)
- List of legendary creatures (Y)
- List of milestones in Kannada literature
- List of modern writers on Eastern religions
- List of Monuments of National Importance in Agra circle
- List of Monuments of National Importance in Andhra Pradesh
- List of Monuments of National Importance in Aurangabad circle
- List of Monuments of National Importance in Bangalore circle
- List of Monuments of National Importance in Belgaum district
- List of Monuments of National Importance in Daman and Diu
- List of Monuments of National Importance in Gujarat
- List of Monuments of National Importance in Kerala
- List of Monuments of National Importance in Lalitpur district
- List of Monuments of National Importance in Lucknow circle/South
- List of Monuments of National Importance in Madhya Pradesh/East
- List of Monuments of National Importance in Madhya Pradesh/West
- List of Monuments of National Importance in Pudukkottai district
- List of Monuments of National Importance in Rajasthan
- List of Monuments of National Importance in Thrissur circle
- List of Monuments of National Importance in West Bengal
- List of mythological objects
- List of northernmost items
- List of North Karnataka historical sites
- List of Pakistani inventions and discoveries
- List of Penguin Classics
- Lists of people by belief
- List of people who died of starvation
- List of people on the postage stamps of India
- List of philosophical concepts
- List of philosophies
- List of places in Multan
- List of places named after people
- List of poets
- List of postage stamps of India
- Lists of religious leaders by century
- List of religious populations
- List of religious sites
- List of religious sites in Wayanad
- List of religions and spiritual traditions
- List of religious buildings and structures of the Kingdom of Mysore
- List of renamed Indian cities and states
- List of rock-cut temples in India
- List of State Protected Monuments in Bihar
- List of State Protected Monuments in Goa
- List of State Protected Monuments in Gujarat
- List of State Protected Monuments in Himachal Pradesh
- List of State Protected Monuments in Karnataka
- List of State Protected Monuments in Madhya Pradesh
- List of State Protected Monuments in Maharashtra
- List of State Protected Monuments in Rajasthan
- List of State Protected Monuments in Uttar Pradesh
- List of State Protected Monuments in West Bengal
- List of tallest statues
- List of the tallest statues in India
- List of Teachers' Days
- List of temples in Bhubaneswar
- List of temples in Kanchipuram
- List of temples in Lahore
- List of timelines
- List of tree deities
- List of tourist attractions in Bangalore
- List of tourist attractions in Delhi
- List of tourist attractions in Jabalpur
- List of tourist attractions in Jaipur
- List of tourist attractions in Kolkata
- List of tourist attractions in Surat
- List of tourist attractions in Vijayawada
- List of vegetarians
- List of vegetarian and vegan festivals
- List of vegetarian and vegan organizations
- List of vegetarian and vegan restaurants
- List of vegetarian and vegan companies
- List of Vijayanagara era temples in Karnataka
- List of world folk-epics
- List of World Heritage Sites in India
- List of World Heritage Sites in Pakistan
- List of Yangon City Heritage
- Jain Literature (template)
- Lives of the Jain Elders (ISBN 9780192832276)
- Living things in culture
- Indian Logic (Jain logic)
- Longsight (area)
- Lord (comparative)
- Loving-kindness
- Lotus position
- Lunisolar calendar

== M ==
- Mahabharata (epic poem)
- Mahamastakabhisheka (festival)
- Mahatma (scholar)
- Mahatma Gandhi (influences)
- Mahavira (24th Tirthankara)
- Mahavira: The Hero of Nonviolence (ISBN 9781937786212)
- Mahavira (mathematician)
- Maha vratas (Major vows)
- Mallinatha (19th Tirthankara)
- Mango (fruit)
- Mantra (sacred utterance)
- Mardava (humility)
- Materialism (philosophy)
- Maya (illusion)
- Meaning of life
- Meat (religious traditions)
- Meditation
- Mendicant (beggar)
- Mercy
- Thomas Merton (Catholic writer)
- Metropolitan Museum of Art (Asian art)
- Microbiology
- Microorganism
- Milk
- Missionary
- Moksha (salvation)
- Monastery (vihara)
- Monasticism (comparative)
- Monk (comparative)
- Moral relativism
- Moral status of animals in the ancient world
- Morality and religion
- Most-perfect magic square
- Mound (archaeology)
- Mount Kailash
- Mount Meru
- Munisuvrata (20th Tirthankara)
- Murtipujaka (subsect)
- Museum of Asian Art (Germany)
- Mysticism

== N ==
- Nair (castes)
- Naked yoga
- Names of God
- Naminatha (21st Tirthankara)
- Namokar Mantra (prayer)
- Namokar Mantra and the Science of Sound (ISBN 9780943207001)
- Narada (legend)
- Naraka (realm)
- Nath (lord)
- Naturism
- Navaratna (nine gems)
- Neminatha (22nd Tirthankara)
- Religion in New Zealand
- Night in paintings (Eastern art)
- Nirvana
- Nirvana Kanda (sacred sites)
- Nonkilling studies (Wikiversity) > Jainism (page)
- Nondualism
- Nontheistic religion
- Nonviolence
- Nonviolent Communication (philosophy of Ahimsa)
- Nudity in religion
- Nun (comparative)
- Nemisuri

== O ==
- Odia language
- Odissi (dance)
- Om (veneration)
- Omniscience
- Oral tradition
- Organizations
- Orthopraxy (conduct)
- Outline of ancient India
- Outline of Assam
- Outline of Andhra Pradesh
- Outline of Arunachal Pradesh
- Outline of the creation–evolution controversy
- Outline of Kerala
- Outline of Maharashtra
- Outline of metaphysics
- Outline of philosophy
- Outline of Rajasthan
- Outline of religion
- Outline of self
- Outline of theology

== P ==
- Pacifism (comparative)
- Padmaprabha (6th Tirthankara)
- Paduka (footwear)
- Panca-Paramesthi (supreme beings)
- Prakrit (language)
- Papa (comparative)
- Parasparopagraho Jivanam (aphorism)
- Paroksha (Indian philosophy)
- Parliament of the World's Religions
- Pascal's triangle (mathematics)
- Parshvanatha (23rd Tirthankara)
- Passions (philosophy)
- Peace and conflict studies
- Peace Mala (project)
- Perspectivism (see also)
- Philosophical skepticism
- Jain Philosophy (template)
- Philosophy of history
- Place of worship
- Places of worship in Bangalore
- Plants in culture
- Pope John Paul II (relations)
- Postage stamps (India)
- Poverty (voluntary)
- Pramada (Indian philosophy)
- Pratima (stages of spiritual rise for lay person)
- Prayer
- Proselytism
- Prostration (gesture)
- Public nudity
- Puranas (literature)
- Pushpadanta (9th Tirthankara)

== Q ==
- Queen Trishala
- Quotes (Wikiquote)

== R ==
- Raga (music)
- Rajabai Clock Tower (history)
- Ramayana (Indian epic poem)
- Ratnatraya (philosophy)
- Reality
- Reincarnation (afterlife)
- Relationship between religion and science
- Relativism
- Religiocentrism
- Religion (comparative)
- Religion and environmentalism
- Religion and peacebuilding
- Religion and science (category)
- Historical Vedic religion
- Religious conversion
- Religious education
- Major religious groups
- Religious law (comparative)
- New religious movement (history)
- Religious pluralism
- Religious studies
- Religious text
- Religious views on euthanasia
- Religious views on organ donation
- Religious views on suicide
- Religious views on truth
- Religious violence in India
- Right to die
- Rishabhanatha (1st Tirthankara)
- Ratnaprabhasuri

== S ==
- Sacred Books of the East
- Sacred language
- Sacred mountains
- Sacred natural site
- Salt
- Salvation
- Samadhi (meditative state)
- Saman Suttam (bible)
- Samayika (vow)
- Sambhavanatha (3rd Tirthankara)
- Samsara (existence)
- Samskara (philosophy)
- Sanctity of life
- Swayamprabhasuri
- Sandalwood
- Sanskrit (language)
- Sant (truthteller)
- Saraks (community)
- Sati (practice)
- Satya (truth)
- Schism (division)
- Schools (sects)
- Sculpture in South Asia
- Sect
- Sentience
- Seven-valued logic
- Shantinatha (16th Tirthankara)
- Shastra (treatise)
- Shaving (in religion)
- Shitalanatha (10th Tirthankara)
- Shreyanasanatha (11th Tirthankara)
- Siddhanta (term)
- Siddhasena Divakara (author)
- Simple living
- Jainism in Singapore
- Religion in Singapore
- Singing to the Jinas (ISBN 9780195140118)
- Snakes and Ladders (game)
- Skyclad (Neopaganism)
- Solar symbol
- Soteriology (study of salvation)
- Soul
- Spiritual ecology
- Spiritual evolution
- Spirituality (note 8)
- Sramana (ascetics)
- Starvation
- Statistics of Jainism
- Status as a distinct religion
- Sthanakvasi (subsect)
- Stotra (song)
- Succubus (Yakshini)
- Sumatinatha (5th Tirthankara)
- Suparshvanatha (7th Tirthankara)
- Sutra (aphorisms)
- Śvetāmbara (sect)
- Terapanth (subsect)
- Swastika (Śvetāmbara symbol)
- Symbols

== T ==
- Tala (music)
- Tandava (dance)
- Tantra (sutra)
- Tattva (truths)
- Tattvartha Sutra (universal book)
- Tattvartha Sutra (ISBN 9780300165296)
- Teaching stories
- Temple
- Jain Temple
- Temples (list)
- Temples (template)
- Jain Temples in Gujarat (ISBN 9781158633616)
- Jain Temples of Rajasthan (ISBN 9788170173489)
- Jain Texts (list)
- Third gender
- Thought for the Day (broadcast)
- Time
- Timeline of Ahmedabad
- Timeline of algebra
- Timeline of ancient history
- Timeline of animal welfare and rights
- Timeline of atomic and subatomic physics
- Timeline of Eastern philosophers
- Timeline of geometry
- Timeline of Goan history
- Timeline of Indian history
- Timeline of Indian innovation
- Timeline of Jainism
- Timeline of Jainism (template)
- Timeline of Karnataka
- Timeline of mathematics
- Timeline of numerals and arithmetic
- Timeline of Raleigh, North Carolina
- Timeline of religion
- Timeline of South Asian history
- Tirtha (sites)
- Tirthankara (Jinas)
- List of the 24 tirthankaras
- Tomoe (shape)
- Tourism in India by state
- Transtheism (attribution)
- Trees in mythology
- Trinidad and Tobago (country)
- Two truths doctrine

== U ==
- Udayagiri Caves
- Umaswami (author)
- Underworld (mythology)
- Jainism in the United States
- Universe (note 135)
- Upadhyaya (preceptor)

== V ==
- Vajra (symbol)
- Vallabhi council
- Vasupujya (12th Tirthankara)
- Jain Vegetarianism
- Vegetarianism and religion
- Victoria and Albert Museum (plundered art)
- Vimalanatha (13th Tirthankara)
- Vitalism (philosophy)
- Vrata (vow)

== W ==
- Walters Art Museum
- Water fasting
- Wikimedia (Jain media)
- WikiProject (Jainism)
- Wiktionary (category) or search (Jainism)
- Women in India
- Women in Jainism
- Jaina Women, The Unknown Pilgrims (ISBN 9788170305354)
- World Compassion Day
- World peace
- Writers (list)
- Writers (template)

== X ==
- Xenagogues (spiritual guides)
- Xenonym (History of the Punjab)
- Xerophagy (characteristic of fasting practices)
- X-Men (comics)
- Xuanzang (Chinese monk)

== Y ==
- Yantra (mystical diagram)
- Yati (monk)
- Year 297 BCE
- Year 300 BCE
- Year 500 BCE
- Year 599 BCE
- Year 600 BCE
- Year 900 BCE
- Year 1000 BCE
- Yoga (system)
- Yogi (practitioner)

== Z ==
- Zero
- Zoism (comparative)
- Zoolatry (Animal worship)
- Zootypes (symbology)

== See also ==
- Jainism
