= List of writers on Jainism =

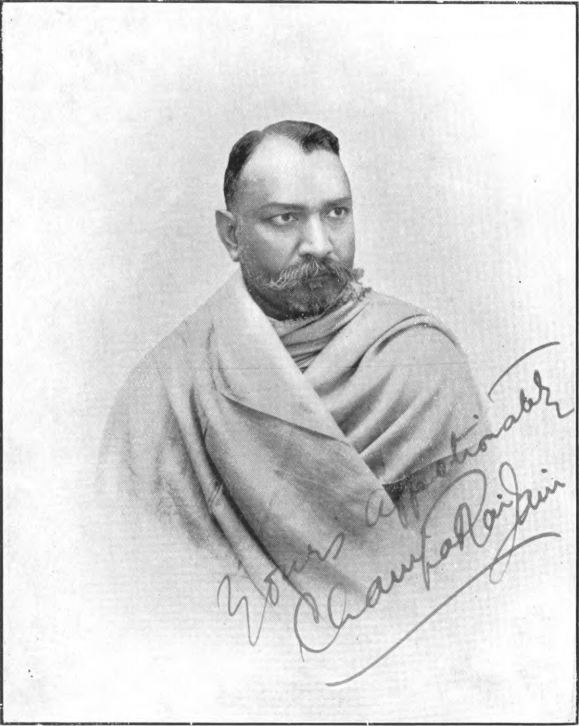
Champat Rai Jain, influential Jain writer of 20th century

This is a list of writers on Jainism. The list should include writers who have Wikipedia articles who have written books about Jainism. Each entry should indicate the writers most well-known work. Multiple works should be listed only if each work has a Wikipedia article.

== 19-20th century ==
- A.N. Upadhye
- Champat Rai Jain
- Chandabai
- Chandrashekhar Vijay
- Hampa Nagarajaiah
- Hermann Jacobi
- Jambuvijaya
- Jinendra Varni
- Madhusudan Dhaky
- Nathuram Premi
- Rajendrasuri
- Sukhlal Sanghvi
- Virchand Gandhi

=== Late 20th century ===
- Phoolchandra Shastri
- Colette Caillat
- Bal Patil
- Padmanabh Jaini
- Paul Dundas

== 21st century ==
- Nalini Balbir
- Prabha Kiran Jain
- Mary Whitney Kelting

== See also ==
- List of modern Eastern religions writers
