= Jules Bloch =

Jules Bloch (May 1, 1880 in Paris – November 29, 1953) was a French linguist who studied Indian languages, and was also interested in languages in their cultural and social contexts.

Doctor of Letters in 1914, he was director of studies at the École pratique des hautes études from 1919 to 1951, professor at the Institut national des langues et civilisations orientales from 1921 to 1937 and professor of Sanskrit language and literature at the College de France in 1937 to 1941 and from 1944 to 1951.

== Bibliography ==
- Jules Bloch, La formation de la langue marathe (The Formation of the Marathi Language), thesis, (1914/1920), Prix Volney.
- Jules Bloch, La Structure Grammaticale des Langues Dravidiennes, Librairie d'Amérique et d'Orient, Adrien-Maisonneuve, Paris, 1946.
- Jules Bloch, 1954, The Grammatical Structure of Dravidian Languages, Authorised Translation from the original French by Ramkrishna Ganesh Harshé, Deccan College Hand-Book Series, Pune.
- Jules Bloch, "Application de la cartographie à l'Histoire de l'Indo-Aryen", (Application of Cartography in Indo-Aryan History), work published posthumously by C. Caillat and P. Meile, in Cahiers de la Société Asiatique, n° XIII, Paris, Imprimerie Nationale, 1963.
- Colette Caillat, Recueil d'articles de Jules Bloch, 1906-1955, (Collection of Articles by Jules Bloch, 1906-1955), texts gathered by Colette Caillat, Collège de France, Institut de civilisation indienne; Published by E. de Boccard, Paris, 1985, ISBN 2-86803-052-1.
