= Criticism of Jainism =

Jainism has been engaged in debates with the other philosophical and religious traditions, in which its theories and its followers' practices have been questioned and challenged.

== Criticism of nudity and patriarchy ==
=== Padmanabh Jaini ===
Padmanabh Jaini, after researching the scriptures of the Digambara sect described several points of critique: -

1. Rituals and ascetic practices: Jaini points out that an emphasis on extreme ascetic practices such as public nudity and rejection of all possessions leads to a diminished focus on spiritual growth and a greater focus on the less important ritualistic practices.
2. Layperson-ascetic dichotomy: Jaini critiques the sharp distinction between the ascetics and laypeople which leads to a lack of spiritual agency among people.
3. Scriptural authority: Jaini questions the Digambara reliance on a highly limited set of scriptures that do not fully represent Jain principles and teachings as followed by the Svetambara sect. Jaini questions the Digambara rejection of the Śvētāmbara canonical scriptures. He argues that this rejection leads to a lack of unity and a fragmentation within Jainism. He also points out that the Digambaras' reliance on later texts as authentic scriptures might lack historical and textual rigor.
4. Gender and nudity: Jaini strongly argues that the practice of public nudity may reinforce patriarchal attitude and limit female spiritual agency. Digambaras hold that women must be reborn as men to attain salvation, which Jaini criticizes for its gender exclusivity and inequality. He argues that female nudity is not equally valued or allowed in the Digambara tradition which greatly limits female spiritual agency as Digambara belief states that moksha cannot be attained without nudity. Further, he states that male nudity leads to masculinization of spirituality. Jaini also mentions that the Digambara sect has historically been male-dominated with women facing several barriers in the path to spirituality and its evolution. His views are seconded by Paul Dundas who states that Digambara rejection of clothing could also signify their rejection of female bodily experience, as clothing is often associated with female modesty and domesticity.
5. Historical development: Jaini also deliberates that the Digambara tradition may have arisen in response to Hinduism, Ājīvikas, and Buddhism, rather than purely from within Jainism.

=== Nalini Balbir ===
Nalini Balbir has criticised the Digambara views on liberation of women and advocates for a more inclusive and gender-equal interpretation of the scriptures. She lists her criticism in the following manner: -

1. Gender bias: Balbir sees the Digambara belief of women not being capable of attaining liberation in their current birth as gender discrimination.
2. Biological determinism: Digambara scriptures attribute spiritual limitations of women to their biology and consider them as unholy. Balbir criticizes this view as narrow and outdated perspective.
3. Lack of scriptural basis: Balbir argues that the narrative describing women not being able to attain liberation is not supported by ancient Jain scriptures (Śvetāmbara canon) and is based on later commentaries.
4. Contradiction with Jain principles: Balbir points out that this view is in contradiction to the fundamental Jain principle of equality and the potential for all living beings to attain liberation.

"The Digambara sect's view that women cannot achieve liberation in their present birth is a 'biological determinism' that is not supported by Jain scriptures. This view is a 'patriarchal interpretation' that has been 'superimposed' on the original teachings of Mahavira."

- Nalini Balbir in "Women in Jainism" (2005)[6]

=== Kristi L. Wiley ===
Kristi L. Wiley, a scholar of Jainism, has also criticized the Digambara sect's views on liberation of women. Specifically, she highlights the following points of critique: -

1. Exclusionary practices and patriarchal interpretations: Women are excluded from the highest spiritual status in Jainism (achieving liberation) by Digambara sect's scriptures. Wiley sees Digambara interpretations of Jain scriptures as patriarchal and biased against women.
2. Lack of agency: Digambaras deny the fundamental agency of achieving liberation (the highest status in Jain spirituality) through their own efforts, instead requiring them to rely on male intermediaries.
3. Inconsistencies with Jain principles: Wiley points out that these views are inconsistent with the fundamental principle of 'equal potential of all living beings to achieve liberation'. She adds that such views may constitute to 'symbolic violence' against women.
4. Textual manipulation: She alleges that the male-dominated Digambara sect has selectively interpreted and manipulated existing and ancient Jain texts to support their views by ignoring passages that highlight women's spiritual potential.

=== Other Religions ===
Scriptures of other religions and schools of thought such as Buddhism, Islam, and Sikhism also criticize and condemn public nudity followed by Digambara monks.

== Criticism of doctrines ==
=== Karma ===
The Jain theory of Karma has been challenged from an early time by the Vedanta and Sāṃkhya branches of Hindu philosophy. In particular, Vedanta Hindus considered the Jain position on the supremacy and potency of karma, specifically its insistence on non-intervention by any Supreme Being in regard to the fate of souls, as nāstika or atheistic. For example, in a commentary to the Brahma Sutras (III, 2, 38, and 41), Adi Sankara argues that the original karmic actions themselves cannot bring about the proper results at some future time; neither can super sensuous, non-intelligent qualities like adrsta—an unseen force being the metaphysical link between work and its result—by themselves mediate the appropriate, justly deserved pleasure and pain. The fruits, according to him, then, must be administered through the action of a conscious agent, namely, a supreme being (Ishvara). (Note: For the Jain refutation of the theory of God as operator and dispenser of karma, see Jainism and non-creationism.)

Many scholars contend that Adi Shankaracharya’s criticism of Anekāntavāda and Syādvāda was not merely flawed but fundamentally careless. As Professor Phanibhushan Adhikari of Banaras Hindu University bluntly stated, Shankara did injustice to Syādvāda by failing to study Jainism’s original texts, a neglect that led to serious misrepresentation and was uncritically echoed by later Vedāntins. From this perspective, Shankara’s refutation reflects not a decisive refutation of Jain epistemology, but a critique built on misunderstanding rather than informed engagement.

Jainism's strong emphasis on the doctrine of karma and intense asceticism was also criticised by the Buddhists. Thus, the Saṃyutta Nikāya narrates the story of Asibandhakaputta, a headman who was originally a disciple of Māhavīra. He debates the Buddha, telling him that, according to Māhavīra (Nigaṇṭha Nātaputta), a man's fate or karma is decided by what he does habitually. The Buddha responds, considering this view to be inadequate, stating that even a habitual sinner spends more time "not doing the sin" and only some time actually "doing the sin".

In another Buddhist text Majjhima Nikāya, the Buddha criticizes Jain emphasis on the destruction of unobservable and unverifiable types of karma as a means to end suffering, rather than on eliminating evil mental states such as greed, hatred and delusion, which are observable and verifiable. Buddha also criticises the Jain ascetic practice of various austerities, claiming that he, Buddha, is happier when not practising the austerities. (Note: In the 8th century Jain text Aṣṭakaprakaraṇam (11.1–8), Haribhadra refutes the Buddhist view that austerities and penances results in suffering and pain. According to him suffering is on account of past karmas and not due to penances. Even if penances result in some suffering and efforts, they should be undertaken as it is the only means of getting rid of the karma. He compares it to the efforts and pains undertaken by a businessman to earn profit, which makes him happy. In the same way the austerities and penances are blissful to an ascetic who desires emancipation. See Haribhadrasūri, Sinha, Ashok Kumar, & Jain, Sagarmal (2000) p. 47)

While admitting the complexity and sophistication of the Jain doctrine, Padmanabh Jaini compares it with that of Hindu doctrine of rebirth and points out that the Jain seers are silent on the exact moment and mode of rebirth, that is, the re-entry of soul in womb after the death. The concept of nitya-nigoda, which states that there are certain categories of souls who have always been nigodas, is also criticized. According to Jainism, nigodas are lowest form of extremely microscopic beings having momentary life spans, living in colonies and pervading the entire universe. According to Jains, the entire concept of nitya-nigoda undermines the concept of karma, as these beings clearly would not have had prior opportunity to perform any karmically meaningful actions.

Jain Karma is also questioned on the grounds that it leads to the dampening of spirits, with men suffering the ills of life because the course of one's life is determined by karma. It is often maintained that the impression of karma as the accumulation of a mountain of bad deeds looming over our heads without any recourse leads to fatalism. However, as Paul Dundas puts it, the Jain theory of karma does not imply lack of free will or operation of total deterministic control over destinies. Furthermore, the doctrine of karma does not promote fatalism among its believers on account of belief in personal responsibility of actions and that austerities could expiate the evil karmas and it was possible to attain salvation by emulating the life of the Jinas.

=== Anekantavada ===
The doctrines of anekāntavāda and syādavāda are criticized on the grounds that they engender a degree of hesitancy and uncertainty, and may compound problems rather than solve them. Critics submit Jain epistemology asserts its own doctrines, but is unable to deny contradictory doctrines, and is therefore self-defeating. It is argued that if reality is so complex that no single doctrine can describe it adequately, then anekāntavāda itself, being a single doctrine, must be inadequate. This criticism seems to have been anticipated by Ācārya Samantabhadra who said: "From the point of view of pramana (means of knowledge) it is anekānta (multi-sided), but from a point of view of naya (partial view) it is ekanta (one-sided)."

In defense of the doctrine, Jains point out that anekāntavāda seeks to reconcile apparently opposing viewpoints rather than refuting them.

Anekāntavāda received much criticism from the Vedantists, notably Adi Sankarācārya (9th century C.E.). Sankara argued against some tenets of Jainism in his bhasya on Brahmasutra (2:2:33–36). His main arguments center on anekāntavāda:

It is impossible that contradictory attributes such as being and non-being should at the same time belong to one and the same thing; just as observation teaches us that a thing cannot be hot and cold at the same moment. The third alternative expressed in the words—they either are such or not such—results in cognition of indefinite nature, which is no more a source of true knowledge than doubt is. Thus the means of knowledge, the object of knowledge, the knowing subject, and the act of knowledge become all alike indefinite. How can his followers act on a doctrine, the matter of which is altogether indeterminate? The result of your efforts is perfect knowledge and is not perfect knowledge. Observation shows that, only when a course of action is known to have a definite result, people set about it without hesitation. Hence a man who proclaims a doctrine of altogether indefinite contents does not deserve to be listened any more than a drunken or a mad man.

— Adi Sankarācārya, Brahmasutra, 2.2:33–36

Many scholars contend that Adi Shankaracharya’s criticism of Anekāntavāda and Syādvāda was not merely flawed but fundamentally careless. As Professor Phanibhushan Adhikari of Banaras Hindu University bluntly stated, Shankara did injustice to Syādvāda by failing to study Jainism’s original texts, a neglect that led to serious misrepresentation and was uncritically echoed by later Vedāntins. From this perspective, Shankara’s refutation reflects not a decisive refutation of Jain epistemology, but a critique built on misunderstanding rather than informed engagement.

Many believe that Sankara fails to address genuine anekāntavāda. By identifying syādavāda with sansayavāda, he instead addresses "agnosticism", which was argued by Sañjaya Belaṭṭhaputta. Many authors like Pandya believe that Sankara overlooked that, the affirmation of the existence of an object is in respect to the object itself, and its negation is in respect to what the object is not. Genuine anekāntavāda thus considers positive and negative attributes of an object, at the same time, and without any contradictions.

Another Buddhist logician Dharmakirti ridiculed anekāntavāda in Pramānavarttikakārika: "With the differentiation removed, all things have dual nature. Then, if somebody is implored to eat curd, then why he does not eat camel?" The insinuation is obvious; if curd exists from the nature of curd and does not exist from the nature of a camel, then one is justified in eating camel, as by eating camel, he is merely eating the negation of curd. Ācārya Akalanka, while agreeing that Dharmakirti may be right from one viewpoint, took it upon himself to issue a rejoinder:

The person who criticises without understanding the prima facie view is acting like a jester and not a critic. The Buddha was born a deer and the deer was born as Buddha; but Buddha is adorable and deer is only a food. Similarly, due to the strength of an entity, with its differences and similarities specified, nobody would eat camel if implored to eat curd.

== Criticism of religious practices ==
=== Bal diksha ===
Bal diksha or the induction of minors in monastic order is criticised as violation of children's rights. Several child rights activists and government agencies questioned the practice and intervened in some instances. Several Jain institutions see this as an interference in religious matter. The legality of the issue was discussed in the courts and the Gujarat high court advised the state and central government to bring legislation to curb the practice. Since 1955, four attempts to get a legislative bill against Bal diksha passed in Parliament have failed. The gazette notification of July 13, 2009, stating that Bal Diksha as practiced in Jainism does not come under the provisions or the jurisdiction of the Juvenile Justice Act was celebrated but later found forged and a case was filed for forgery.

=== Sallekhana ===
Sallekhana is the religious vow of gradually reducing the intake of food and liquids observed by terminally ill or old Jain disciples. It is widely called fasting unto death as there is a reduction in food intake. It is practiced with the approval of Jain monks and can last over 12 years or more. It was petitioned that Rajasthan High Court should declare the practice illegal. In response, the Jain community said that the practice was a religious activity which was protected under article 25 of the Indian constitution. In August 2015, Rajasthan High Court cited that the practice is not an essential tenet of Jainism and banned the practice, making it punishable under section 306 and 309 IPC (Abetment of Suicide). But a few days later, The Supreme Court of India stayed the High Court's order.

=== Status of women ===
Jainism includes women in their fourfold sangha, the religious order of Jain laymen, laywomen, monks and nuns. The early Śvetāmbara scriptures imposed restrictions on pregnant women, young women or those who have a small child, to enter the ranks of nuns. Regardless, the number of nuns given in those texts were always double the number of monks. Parshvanatha and Mahavira, two historical Tirthankars of Jainism, had huge numbers of female devotees and ascetics. Moreover, the restrictions on certain women to enter ranks of nuns were not attributable to Jainism alone, but the erstwhile patriarchal Indian society as a whole.

According to the Svetambara's scriptures such as Chhedasutra, women were given lesser authority than their male counterparts. Commentaries state that this is because things which could endanger the vow of chastity should be avoided. Nalini Balbir writes that the belief that women are more fragile than men were all-pervading in these texts.

The Digambar sect of Jainism believes that women must be reborn as men in order to achieve liberation. Digambars maintain that women cannot take higher vows of ascetic renunciation.

The Swetambar sect, however, disagrees with this position, holding that one of the Tirthankars, Mallinath, was a woman and even today the majority of Swetambar monastics are female.

== Sources ==
- Balbir, Nalini (1994). "Women in Jainism". In Sharma, Arvind (ed.). Religion and Women. SUNY Press. p. 121. ISBN 978-0-7914-1690-7.
- Bronkhorst, Johannes (1993), The Two Traditions of Meditation in Ancient India, Delhi: Motilal Banarsidass Publ, ISBN 81-208-1114-3
- Daniel, P.S. (2000), Hindu Response to Religious Pluralism, Kant Publications, ISBN 978-8186218105, archived from the original on 2013-12-07
- Dundas, Paul (2002), Hinnels, John (ed.), The Jains, London: Routledge, ISBN 0-415-26606-8
- Flood, Gavin D. (1996), An Introduction to Hinduism, Cambridge University Press, ISBN 9780521438780
- Gomez, Luis O. (2013), Buddhism in India. In: Joseph Kitagawa, "The Religious Traditions of Asia: Religion, History, and Culture", Routledge, ISBN 9781136875908
- Jaini, Padmanabh (2000), Collected Papers on Jaina Studies, Delhi: Motilal Banarsidass Publ, ISBN 81-208-1691-9
- Kalghatgi, Dr. T. G. (1988), Study of Jainism, Jaipur: Prakrit Bharti Academy
- King, Richard (2001), Orientalism and Religion: Post-Colonial Theory, India and "The Mystic East", Taylor & Francis e-Library
- Krishan, Yuvraj (1997), The doctrine of Karma: its origin and development in Brāhmaṇical, Buddhist, and Jaina traditions, Delhi: Motilal Banarsidass Publishers, ISBN 978-81-208-1233-8
- Malalasekera, G. P. (2003), Dictionary of Pali Proper Names, London: Asian Educational Services, ISBN 81-206-1823-8
- Nicholson, Andrew J. (2010), Unifying Hinduism: Philosophy and Identity in Indian Intellectual History, Columbia University Press
- Pandey, G.C. (1978), Sramana Tradition, Ahmedabad: L.D. Indology
- Panicker, P.L. John (2006), Gandhi on Pluralism and Communalism, ISPCK, ISBN 9788172149055
- Rambachan, Anatanand (1994), The Limits of Scripture: Vivekananda's Reinterpretation of the Vedas, University of Hawaii Press
- Springer (2012), International Journal of Hindu Studies, Vol. 16, No. 3, December 2012
- Thomas, Edward J. (1975), "The Life of Buddha as Legend and History", Nature, vol. 120, London: Routledge, p. 152, Bibcode:1927Natur.120R.152., doi:10.1038/120152b0, hdl:2027/mdp.39015034711559, ISBN 0-7100-8162-6, S2CID 4073896
