= History and culture of Kaviyoor =

Kaviyoor is a village located in Thiruvalla Sub-District & Taluk In Pathanamthitta district of Kerala State, India, situated on the western bank of the Manimala River.It Is Located Adjoining Thiruvalla Municipal Town.

The origin of the word 'Kaviyoor' has not yet been acceptably traced. An edict (951 C.E.) calls it Kaviyoor; another record (1551 C.E.)during the period of Brahmin supremacy, refers it to as in Sanskritised form 'Kapiyoor'. Since Jainism reached Kerala through Karnataka, the Jains, after settling in what is now Kaviyoor and carving a cave out of a huge rock for stay and prayers, might have named the place Kaviyoor (Kavi=Cave, in old Kannada & Oor=Place). The claim that Kavi is Cave in old Kannada has not been examined by scholars. Some believe Kapiyoor became Kaviyoor over a period of time;(Kapi=Monkey, Oor=Place).Thus kapiyoor means place for monkeys. They attribute the name to the presence of the Lord Hanuman.

== Etymology ==
The argument against Kapiyoor is that the author who wrote this word using either Ezhuthani (pointed writing instrument made of iron, എഴുത്താണി) or any etching instrument might have accidentally put a small round or curve at the beginning of the letter 'വ'. When the curve at the beginning is smaller, 'വ' becomes 'പ '. This minor mistake from an ancient author is no reason to conclude that the place might have been named Kapiyoor (കപിയൂര്). Even now, literate people make the same mistake. Unfortunately, the word 'kapi' was even entered on the dhwaja sthambhom (flag mast) of Mahadeva temple – the Sanskrit verses written on it refer to 'plavagapuram' (Palvagam=monkey in Sanskrit), a synonym for 'Kapiyoor'. At least one old record in vattezuth (old script used before modern vedic Malayalam script formulated by Aryan settlers) refers to the village as 'Kaviyoo' – the author missed out the last letter. Historians are of the opinion that 'Kaviyoor' means overflow land, because the Manimala river flooded every year and surpass to the vast punja (rice field).

== Jainism, Buddhism and Hinduism ==
The village is listed in Brahmin history as one of the 64 Brahmin villages (32 in Kerala and 32 in South Karnataka) established by Vishnu-incarnate Parashuram. These settlements were on the banks of rivers. Kaviyoor has remained fertile thanks to river Manimala that flows south of the village. The original inhabitants were Dravidians who embraced Jainism and later Buddhism due to the missionary work of the powerful Maurian emperors throughout India, China and southeast Asia. The Vedic seer, Shankarachayra defeated Buddhists monks in debates throughout India, which forced them and their followers to embrace Hinduism by 8th Century, C.E. In Kerala, the people then stuck to Vedic Aryanism, because the Dravidian Chera king Kulashekara Azhwar was a staunch follower of it. The word 'Palli' denotes Buddhist school/hermitage. (The area behind N.S.S. High School is still called 'Pallipuram'. The N.S.S. High School was established around 1924, over the traditional cemetery of stonesmiths/masons). There are two other places called Pazhampalli and Mundiyappally which border the Panchayath of Kunnanthanam, indicating a Buddhist past. After the spread of Vedic Hinduism post-800 C.E, the prayer centres of Jains/Buddhists might have been converted to temples. There is no proof or even hints as to what happened in Kaviyoor from 800 C.E. to 1750, C.E. However, the strong Brahmin presence of Kaviyoor is an important feature of this period.

== Early history ==
It was a part of Nanruzhai Nadu which had its capital in what is now Thrikkodithanam, 9 km west of Kaviyoor that covered Thiruvalla and Changanassery of central Travancore. Definitely, in the 12th century, C.E, as Nanruzhai Nadu fell apart, Kaviyoor became part of the kingdom of Thekkumkoor rajas who were believed to have ruled from five centres, the nearest being Puzhavathu, Changanacherry. Was it ever part of Vilakkili (വിലക്കിലി) Namboothiris who ruled Thiruvalla? Thekkumkoor Rajas had apparently allowed Brahmins to rule the 'graamam' under his suzerainty. Kaviyoor was a prominent Brahmin village and they were considered superior to the Brahmins of Thiruvalla, another Brahmin village of repute. (Kaviyoor Brahmins never married Thiruvalla Brahmins till about 50–75 years ago). Vilakkili Namboothiris were the main priests of Kaviyoor at some point of time, esp. 1400–1600, C.E. That all the Namboothiris of Kaviyoor were close to both Thekkumkoor and Vilakkili is evident from the fact Marthanda Varma, the king of Travancore, barred them from taking part in Murajapam, the annual prayer ritual at Sree Padmanabha Temple, Trivandrum. The village Brahmins are all Yajurvedis. Many Brahmins in Kottarakkara, Kalanjoor, Paipad, Vaypoor, Keezhvaypoor, Thrikkodithanam, Puthoor, Kavungumprayar, Kulathoor etc. are known as 'Kaviyoor Graamam' Brahmins.

== Pathillam Pottis ==
Most of land was owned by the temple which ensured the welfare of the Brahmins. There is a reliable version that Naithelloor, a Brahmin family, had the upper hand in administration during pre-Travancore days. Their descendants still live in the village. It is one of the thirteen Brahmin families that owned the Kaviyoor Temple once upon a time. Earlier the system of management by Pathillathu Brahmins (പത്തില്ലത്തില് പോറ്റിമാര്) existed in Kaviyoor in which the whole village (ബ്രാഹ്മണഗ്രാമം)was owned by the main temple and in turn the temple was managed by Brahmin families, with each bramin family getting one tenth of the income of the temple. The families and their rights (share, in bracket) are as shown below:

1. Kaviyoor Illam (1), 2.Kizhakkineth Illam (1), 3. Vengassery Illam (1), 4. Kaduthanam Illam (1/3), 5. Nedungala Illam (1/3), 6. Attupuram Illam (1/3), 7. Naithelloor Illam (1), 8. Padinjare Thengumpally Illam (1), 9. Kizhakke Thengumpally Illam (1), 10. Kachira Vadasseri Illam (1), 11. Moothedath Vadasseri Illam (1), 12. Chaathyaattu (Chaathikaattu) Vadasseri Illam (1).

The shares add up to ten, spread among 13 families. The prominent ones among them were Naithelloor and Moothedath Vadassei. The latter owned the mount where Shiva temple was built. The former ended up as the de facto rulers of the village. Many of these illams do not exist now. What is significant is that there is an illam called 'Kaviyoor'. Was their name given to the village or did they take the name of the village? Naithelloor Namboothiris are migrants from Kodungallor. They brought with them the Nair family of Nilakkal and Marar family of Parakkattu. The annual pilgrimage of this Namboothiri to Kodungalloor and the establishment of Njaliyil temple are mentioned ibidem. People interested in Kerala history should note that there was a 'Kaduthanam' (കടുത്താനം) Illam in Thrikkodithanam too. Some blocks of land there still bear the same name. Did Thri-kaduthanam become Thri-kodithanam (alright, there is this thiru-khadika-sthaanam theory)? In Perunna too an illam called Kaduthanam existed. The assets of some of the Brahmins without any legal heirs were merged with other Brahmin families. Some left for other areas. Only a few Brahmin families remain in Kaviyoor now.

== Deshams ==
The ancient Kaviyoor Graamam comprised five deshams, viz, Padinjattumcherry, Anjilithanam, Kunnanthanam, Iraviperoor and Murani (Mallappally West). Parts of Muthoor East also fell within Kaviyoor. The temple procession (Ooruvalathth, ഊരുവലത്ത്) still goes to these areas – except to Mallappally west (Murani) which is done only symbolically.

== Thirunelli Temple ==
Near Thrikkalkudi Para, there was a temple, dedicated to an unknown deity. Some say this used to be known as Thirunelli (തിരുനെല്ലി) probably encompassed by a fort. There is no mark left of these institutions now. However, these theories have since been discounted by historians. There was no fort either. What actually existed there was not a temple, but fane - a tribal shrine dedicated to some tribal deity, predating even Jain and Buddhist occupation. As the shrine fell in ruins, the idol was shifted to Kuriyan Kavu temple, where it is kept as 'upadevta', (lower deity). The deity is now merely called 'Moorthy'. The reasons for naming the area 'Kottoor' is yet to be studied.

== Thrikkannapuram Temple ==
There is not even a trace of the structure where this small Krishna temple stood at Padinjattumcherry, near the Mahadeva Temple. Some idols of nagdevathas are the only reminder of the temple that was probably owned by a Brahmin family. This family might have stayed close to the temple. As the family shifted to other place or ended up not having any legal heirs after the last of them died, the structure gradually collapsed and the beautiful idol of Krishna was shifted to Kazhanoor Illam where it is preserved in a small shrine. The site was passed on to others and ultimately a small church of Mar Thoma sect of Christians was built there. There was an attempt by some people to remove the Naga idols which failed due to the resistance of locals led by the Namboothiri of Kazhanoor Illam.

Kaviyoor became part of Travancore when King Marthanda Varma gobbled up all the territories up to Udayanapuram (20 km south of Cochin) in 1752–53.

== Cave temple ==
An ancient rock cut temple is located there, carved on a huge rock and the carved rooms and sculptures aore well preserved. The Kaviyoor Thrikkakkudi (തൃക്കക്കുടി. see the correct name below) Cave Temple, also known as the Rock Cut Cave Temple, is of historical importance and is preserved as a monument by the Archaeological Department. The temple was taken over by the Travancore Devaswom Board on 20 December 1967(See:http://www.archaeology.kerala.gov.in/index.php?option=com_content&view=article&id=56&Itemid=77).

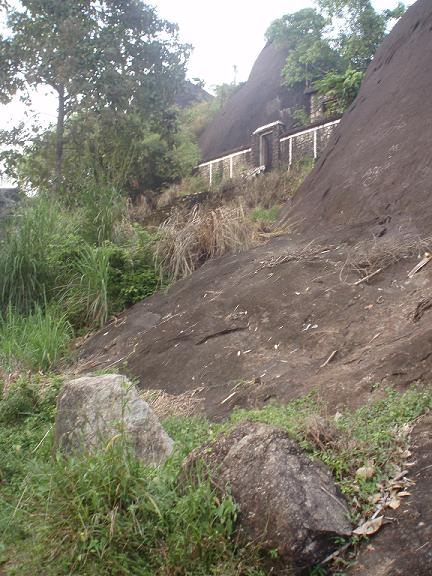
Cave Temple, Kaviyoor, 2008

The temple has a verandah with a sculpture of Lord Ganapathi carved into the wall and inner sanctum containing a tall shivalinga, all carved out a one huge rock. It bears close resemblance to the Pallava style of architecture. The engravings here are among the earliest specimens of stone sculptures in Kerala. Enshrined in a square cave is the main deity of the shrine, Lord Shiva, represented in the ' Shivalinga' which is about three feet high and carved out of rock. The shrine also has idols of Ganapathy, Maharshi and Dwarapalakas. It was constructed during the rule of the Pallava dynasty who reigned over South India from 608 to 850 AD.

The rock, housing the cave, is actually called Thri-kal-kudi Paara. (Thri/Thiru= Divine, Kal=Stone/Rock, Kudi=home/settlement, Paara=Rock/Boulder. Mal. തൃക്കല്ക്കുടി ). Literally, this means cave settlement. The land surrounding the rock also was called 'Kal-kudi' (കല്ക്കുടി). Still, there is a nearby piece of land by name 'Kakkudiyil', a corrupt form for 'Kalkudiyil' (കല്ക്കുടിയില് ). More corrupt forms (like Thrikkaakkudi, Thrikkokudi etc.) are doing rounds as newer generations of people, defying rhyme and reason, use words, ignoring their etymological significance.

== Kaviyoor Mahadeva Temple ==
History:

Kaviyoor Mahadevar Temple which has a unique style of architecture and is one of the oldest temples in Kerala. Also known as Thrikkaviyoor Mahadeva Temple, it is one of the prominent temples in Kerala. In the medieval period most of the land property was at the disposal of the temple, due to its tax free status. People donate or sold the land to temple to escape from land taxation, and continued to cultivate the land on lease. Temple stands on a small hillock and is built in the gable style architecture peculiar to Kerala. It is believed to have been constructed in the early years of the 10th century and the 'Kaviyoor Shasanas' of 950/951 C.E. has references to the gifts that were offered to this temple. The 'Darusilpas' (wood sculpture) seen around the temple belong to the 17th century. The temple festival is held in December–January of every year. Hanumth Jayanthi, the birth anniversary of Lord Hanuman is also celebrated along with the temple festival.

Artwork:

The "DAARUSILPAS"(wood sculpture) seen around the temple belong to the 17th century when the temple was rebuilt/renovated. The wood carvings on the outer wall of the Sreekovil (sanctum sanctorum), inner roof of Balickalpura and Namaskara Mandapam are excellent. The Temple itself is a beautiful specimen of Kerala style architecture.

Main deity: Lord Mahadeva & Parvathi. The main idol is not Shiva, but 'Sambashiva' (സാംബശിവന് = സ + അംബ + ശിവന് = അംബാസമേതനായ ശിവന്), that is, Shiva with consort Amba (Parvathi)-as is evident form the 'mooladhyanam', the main invocational mantra. Even the locals are not aware of this fact. Instead of 'Mahadeva Temple', it should be called 'Sambashiva' or Uma-Maheshwara Temple. The addition of Parvathi, christened as Srimoola Rajeshwari, on the western side of srikovil was done by Kaviyoor Pachu Moothath (1845–1917) and relations who had the rights to 'kazhakam' of all shrines (nadas) within the temple, though this was objected to by the then Thanthri (chief priest) of the temple, saying there could not be two 'Parvathis'. However Moothath being the then royal physician for the king Sree Moolam Thirunaal and also the first principal of Ayurveda College, Trivandrum, used his connections to overrule the thanthri.

Upadevas

Hanuman: The Hanuman shrine in the north-west corner of Srikovil is very famous. The idol is believed to have been installed by sage Vilvamangalam Swami. The Lord is believed to sit on the Ilanji tree (Mimusops elengi) and the rostrum below just outside the sanctum sanctorum. The tree has been swallowed by a Banyan tree, despite being informed to the Devasom Board that the Banyan tree should be removed. Once an Ilanji perished new one would sprout at the same place, so there used to be no planting of new trees in the past. The raised dais-like structure, the Ilanjithara (ഇലഞ്ഞിത്തറ) around the tree used to be the podium for conducting arts and cultural programs. The unwanted Banyan tree is a threat to the temple complex. Its roots have already penetrated the wall of the nearby pond; part of the pond wall has collapsed. The roots can easily reach the very foundation of this illustrious temple and its Dhwaja sthambhom (the flag mast) soon! Alas! The whole temple is going to be a victim of lack of knowledge of local history and culture and lack of proper management of the Travancore Devaswom Board.

Dakshinamoorthy: This is the southern shrine of the sanctum sanctorum. Dakshinamoorthy, the lord of knowledge or the Supreme Teacher, is a form of Shiva. There are daily poojas here. Lord Dakshinamoorthy is believed to sit under a banyan tree in the Himalayas facing south, teaching the wisdom of Vedas to the divine people. Hence the idols of this god is always installed facing south.

Nagadevathas: The Ilanjithara houses deities of Nagas (serpent gods). This was a later addition – as people, pressured by modern ways of living, found it difficult to maintain Naga shrines in their homes, the idols were transferred to the temple. The main pooja here is on the Ayilaym day in Kanni (Sept–Oct).

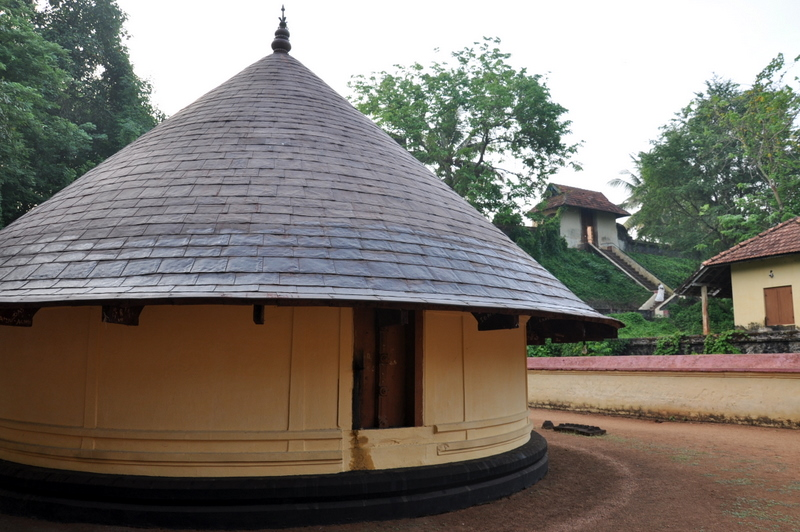
Sri Krishna Temple, Kaviyoor

The Sreekrishna Temple: Now reduced to a minor shrine, to the west of the Shiva temple, this temple, on the shore of a reservoir, existed much before the Mahadeva temple. Its location is unique in that the mound over which the Shiva temple was built hides this shrine from the rising sun. Since the temple is below the level of the main temple it is also called Keezhthrikkovil (കീഴ് തൃക്കോവില്). The whole complex, though small, is a photographer's delight and has appeared in books on Indian temples. An independent temple, tantra-wise, it is regarded as a part of Shiva temple by the Devaswom Board for convenience of administration. The poojas are performed by a Brahmin family – Kuzhiyaanoor Illam – brought to Kaviyoor centuries ago exclusively for this temple from Kozhikode during the fiefdom of Pathillathu Brahmins.

Yakshi: The shrine is outside the temple, near Keezhchirakkal Illam, which owned it long ago. The 'Yakshi' was brought to Kaviyoor from Kodunthura, Pathanamthitta by an elder Moothath of the Illam when he married a girl from Kodunthura. The shrine was later handed over to Kaviyoor temple authorities. The concept of 'Yakshi' coalesced into Hinduism from Jainism. The Yakhi is believed to bless spinsters who pray for timely marriage (മംഗല്യപ്രദായിനി).Special day: Aavani Onam (ആവണി ഓണം ).

Main Offeringsat Mahadeva and Krishna Temples: Shiva: Dhara; Hanuman: Vatamala, Aval Nivedyam (AvalPanthirunaazhi), Vettila mala, Thrikkai venna & Venna charthu; Krishna: Palppayasam

== Festivals ==
1. Thiruvutsavam of Mahadeva Temple: The annual fest commences from the day of Betelguese (Thiruvaathira, തിരുവാതിര) in the Malayalam month of Dhanu (December–January) and ends on 10th day by Araattu Ezhunnellippu.'Utsavabali','Seva','Pallivetta' are the main functions during Thiruvutsavam.

2. Sivaratri-February/March->Vilakkezhunnellippu lighting of 8000 Diyas of temple by devotees of 5 Kara's (Desam).

3. (Sahasra Kalasam-Anointing the idol for 10 days with 100 pots of water; 1 gold pot, 10 silver pot and remaining copper pots)

4. Hanumad Jayanthy, the birth anniversary of Lord Hanuman is also celebrated along with Thiruvutsavam (December–January. Aprocession with "Pushpa Ratham" (festooned chariot) is the main attraction. The "Ghoshayaathra"(rally) starts from Njaliyil Bhagavathi Temple.

5. Pantrandukalabham – August (Anointing with Sandal paste).

5. Ashtami Rohini: The birth anniversary celebrations of Lord Krishna at Sree Krishna Temple; Chingam (August–September)

=== Njaliyil Bhagavathy Temple ===
Njaliyil Bhagavathy Temple is dedicated to Bhagawathy who is actually Bhadrakali, at Njalikandam province of Kaviyoor, about a km east of the main Shiva temple.

An old temple formerly owned by Naithallur Illam (immigrants from Kodungalloor; see 'History'), it is now managed by the public. The goddess was originally enshrined in the illam, but was shifted to the present site later. The locals believe that once upon a time the head of the illam used to go on an annual pilgrimage to Kodungallor and when he became too old to travel the goddess offered to settle in his illam. The shrine was shifted as the goddess apparently became more powerful to be housed in a family shrine. In the month of Makaram (January)'Ashwathy' festival is conducted. The festival's name comes from "Aswathy", the first of the 27 birth stars in Malayalam astrology. Eye-catching Thaalapoli (താലപ്പൊലി), a procession of young women carrying lamps/wicks and grain in well-adorned trays for appeasing the deity is an important annual function. And Noottiyonnu Kalam, offering of 101 earthen pots filled with grains etc. (നൂറ്റൊന്നു കലം, like Pongala) and Annadaanam (free mass feast) are the other events (offerings) during festival time. Padayani – this is a combination of music, dance, painting, satire etc. reflecting the ancient socialist society before Aryanization and advent of four caste system – is the colourful annual event extolling Bhadrakali for the murder of Daarika, a demon.

== Thirunelli Temple ==
Near the cave Thrikkalkudi Para, there was a temple, dedicated to Vishnu (some believe Shiva), and used to be known as Thirunelli (തിരുനെല്ലി) probably encompassed by a fort. There is no mark left of these institutions now. Who ruled from this fort is a mystery. There was a belief that it had got something to do with the Ezhumatoor kings. It was also linked to Dalit community. Because of the fort (കോട്ട), the area was christened 'Kottoor'.am

=== Other temples and shrines ===
The other small temples in the village are dedicated to Ayyappa (Padinjattumcherry), Subrahmanya (Kottoor), Kuruthikamankavu temple-dedicated to Bhadrakali and Ayyappa sitting face to face in two separate shrines (This is a rare type in Kerala), Thiruvamanpuram (north of the main temple). These were owned by Brahmin families and are now run with public cooperation.

== Churches in Kaviyoor ==
The Christian community in Kaviyoor belong to the various Christian denominations like CSI, Marthoma, Orthodox, Catholic and Pentecostals.

Marthoma Churches in Kaviyoor

There are five Marthoma Churches are there in Kaviyoor

1. Marthoma Valiyapally kaviyoor, (Padinjattumcheri)
2. Kaviyoor Njalbhagom Sleeba Mar Thoma Church, (Njalbhagom)
3. Kaviyoor Salem Marthoma Church
4. St.Pauls Mar Thoma Church, Kaviyoor (Kaniampara)
5. Immanuel Mar Thoma Church, Kottoor
