= Colette Caillat =

French professor of Sanskrit and comparative grammar (1921–2007)

- Born: 15 January 1921; Saint-Leu-la-Forêt, Seine-et-Oise
- Died: 15 January 2007 (aged 86); Sèvres, France
- Citizenship: French
- Education: Swiss Federal Polytechnic (1896–1900; B.A., 1900); University of Zurich (Ph.D., 1905)
- Awards: Officer of the Legion of Honour; Commander of the Ordre national du Mérite; Commander of the Ordre des Palmes Académiques (1987); Elected a member of the Académie des Inscriptions et Belles-Lettres(1987)
- Scientific career
- Fields: Sanskrit, comparative grammar
- Workplaces: University of Lyon (1960–1966); Sorbonne University (1967–1988)
- Thesis: Les expiations dans le rituel ancien des religieux Jaina (1965)
- Academic advisors: Walther Schubring

Colette Caillat (French: [kɔlɛt kaja]; 15 January 1921 – 15 January 2007) was a French professor of Sanskrit and comparative grammar. She was also one of the world's leading Jain scholars.

== Biography ==
Caillat was born in Saint-Leu-la-Forêt, Seine-et-Oise. She embarked upon her academic career with the study of Classical Latin and Greek, focusing on their literary and grammatical aspects. This led her to the study of Sanskrit under Louis Renou and Jules Bloch, who replaced Renou who was visiting India. Bloch played a key role in exposing his students to Indian classical languages such as Pali, Prakrit and Apabhramsha as well as modern Indo-Aryan languages. Encouraged by the strong presence of Indian students in his class, Bloch taught his students various details of Indian life.

After clearing the French “Agrégation” civil service examination, Caillat taught at various secondary schools, until she found a post at the Centre national de la recherche scientifique. She was then free to devote all her time to Indian studies, starting with a mémoire on nominal derivation in Middle Indo-Aryan which led her to read Jain texts under the supervision of Walther Schubring in Hamburg. Schubring led Caillat firmly on the path of Jain studies and encouraged her to participate in the Critical Pali Dictionary.

Caillat first visited India in 1963 and remained a regular visitor to India throughout her life. In India, she developed close contact with A.N. Upadhye, Pandit D.D. Malvania, H.C. Bhayani, Pandit Sukhlalji and Muni Punyavijayaji. She stayed and worked several times in Mysore and Ahmedabad.

Caillat first taught Sanskrit and Comparative Grammar at the University of Lyon from 1960 to 1966. She was appointed to the Sorbonne University (then University of Paris-3) in 1967, as the successor of Louis Renou who had died suddenly, where she remained until retirement in 1988. She died on January 15, 2007. Her academic tradition is continued by her students, included among whom is Nalini Balbir.

== Awards and honors ==
Caillat was a commander of the Légion d'honneur, commander of Ordre national du Mérite, and commander of the Ordre des Palmes Académiques. She was elected a member of the Académie des Inscriptions et Belles-Lettres in 1987, and was a member of several other academies and scholarly associations.

== Academic publications ==
Her contribution to the field of Jain studies and Middle Indo-Aryan linguistics is manifold. Apart from a number of articles, her main books are the following:

- 1965 Les expiations dans le rituel ancien des religieux Jaina, Paris, 1965 (D.Litt. thesis), translated into English as Atonements in the Ancient Ritual of the Jaina Monks, Ahmedabad, 1975 (L.D. Series 49).
- 1966 Drei Chedasûtras des Jaina-Kanons - Ayâradasâo, Vavahâra, Nisîha. Bearbeitet von Walther Schubring. Mit einem Beitrag von Colette Caillat, Hamburg, 1966.
- 1971 Candâvejjhaya, La Prunelle-cible. Introduction, Edition critique, Traduction, Commentaire, Paris, 1971.
- 1974-75 C. Caillat, A.N. Upadhye and Bal Patil, Jainism, Delhi, 1974–75. New edition, 2006.
- 1981 La cosmologie jaina. Présentation de Colette Caillat d'après les documents recueillis par Ravi Kumar, Paris, 1981. The Jain Cosmology. English rendering by K.R. Norman, New Delhi; revised and enlarged edition, New Delhi, 2004.
- 1985 Edition of Recueil d'articles de Jules Bloch 1906–1955, Paris, 1985.
- 1999 Yogîndu, Lumière de l'Absolu. Traduit de l'apabhramsha par Nalini Balbir et Colette Caillat, Paris, Payot, Rivages, 1999.
- 2007 co-edition, with Nalini Balbir, of the volume Jaina Studies, Proceedings of the World Sanskrit Conference, Helsinki, 2003 (in press).
- In 1981, Mme Caillat, who was the head of the research group "Equipe de Philologie Bouddhique et Jaina", organised in Strasbourg the first International Jain Symposium outside India. The Proceedings were published in 1983 (Indologica Taurinensia, Vol 11).
- In 1988, a Felicitation volume was offered in her memory (published as Indologica Taurinensia, Vol 14).
- In 2007, 1000 copies of Acarya Joindu's Yogasara were distributed free of cost in her memory (published as Pandit Nathuram Premi Research Series, Vol 10).
- In 2011 the Pali Text Society published Caillat's Selected Papers (Oxford, ISBN 0-86013-479-2).
