= History of Jaipur =

History of the capital of Rajasthan, India

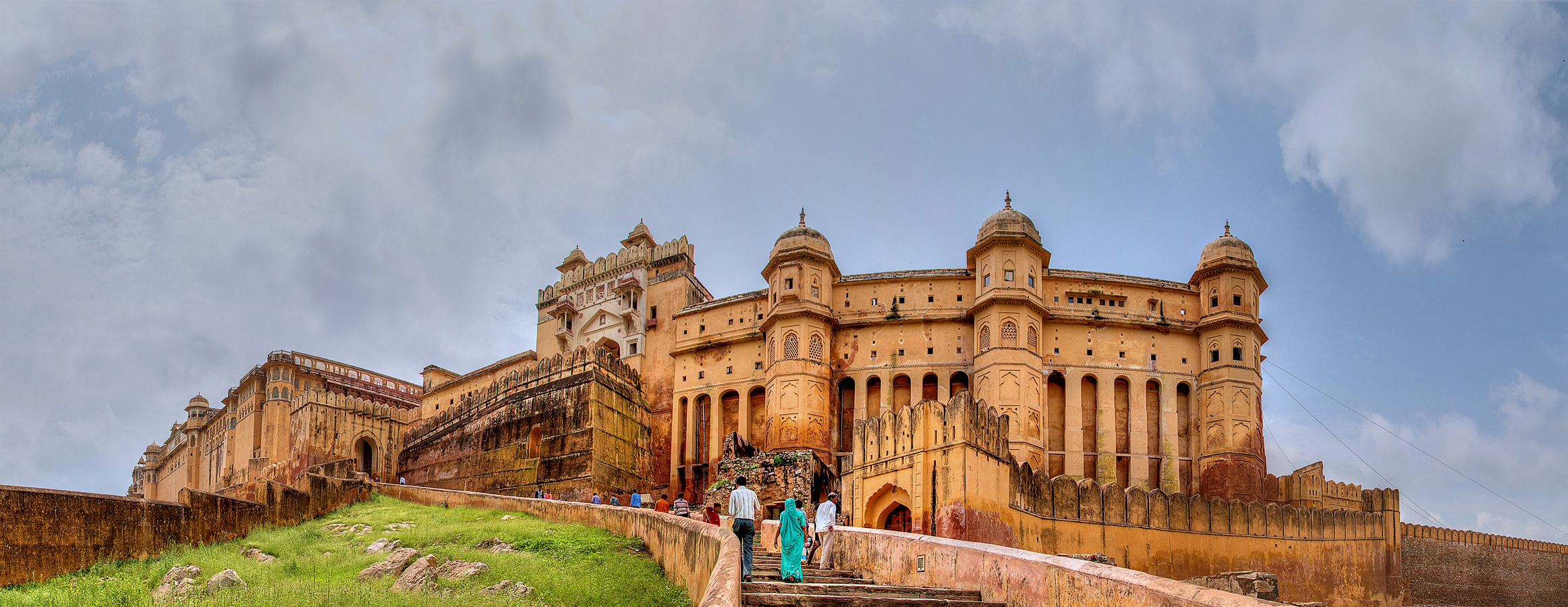
The present Amer Fort was built in 1592 during the reign of Raja Man Singh and was expanded by his successor Jai Singh I. It was designated a UNESCO World Heritage Site in 2013.

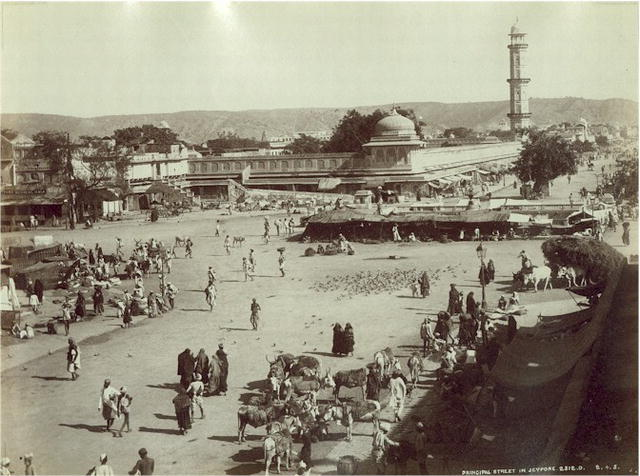
Jaipur, Principal Street, c. 1875

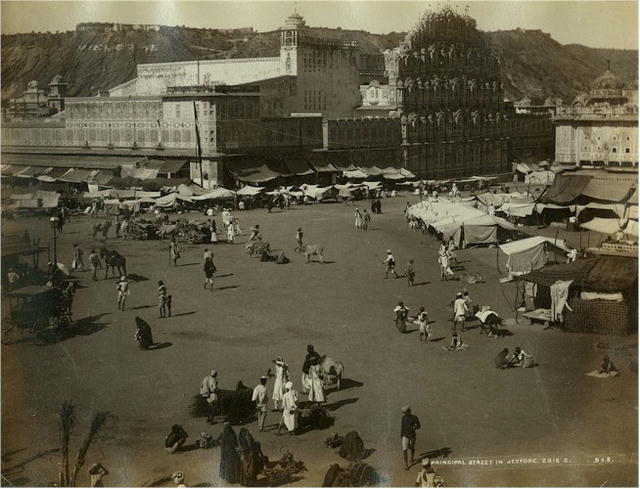
Hawa Mahal, and the Principal Street of Jaipur, c. 1875

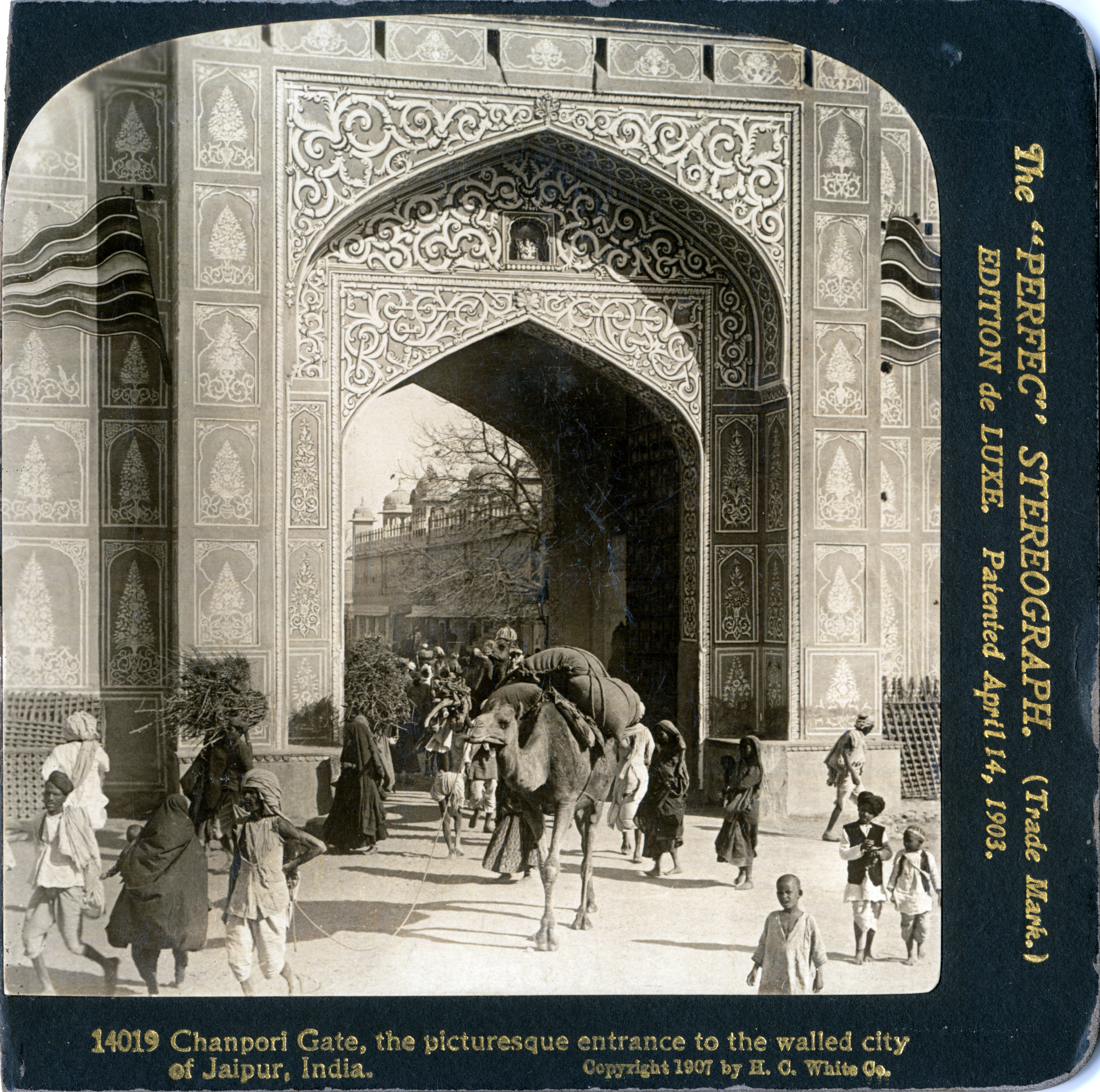
Jaipur, 1907.

Jaipur, the capital of Rajasthan state in India, was founded in 1727 by Maharaj Sawai Jai Singh II, who ruled Jaipur State from 1699–1744. He consulted several books on architecture and architects before making the layout of Jaipur.

== Overview ==
Jai Singh II was keen on the security aspect of the City because of foreign threats towards northern India. Due to this reason, he focused on his scientific and cultural interests to make a brilliant city. Being a lover of mathematics and science, Jai Singh sought advice from Vidyadhar Bhattacharya, a Brahmin scholar of Bengal, to aid him to design the city architecture. Vidyadar referred the ancient Indian literature on astronomy, books of Ptolemy and Euclid, and discussed the plan with the King.

With a strategic plan, the construction of the city started in 1727. It took around 4 years to complete the major palaces, roads and square. The city was built following the principles of Vastu Shastra. The city was divided into nine blocks, out of which two consist the state buildings and palaces, whereas the remaining seven blocks were allotted to the public. In order to ensure the security, huge fortification walls were made along with seven strong gates.

According to that time, architecture of the town was very advanced and certainly the best in Indian subcontinent. In 1876, when Prince of Wales visited Jaipur, the whole city was painted pink to welcome him and after that Jaipur was titled ‘Pink City’. Still, the neat and broadly laid-out avenues, painted in pink provide a magical charm to the city. Jaipur is rich in its cultural and architectural beauty, which can be traced in the various historical and aesthetic places that reside in the city.

In the 19th century the city grew rapidly and became prosperous; by 1900 it had a population of 160,000. The city's wide boulevards were paved and lit with gas. The city had several hospitals. Its chief industries were in metals and marble, fostered by a school of art founded in 1868. The city also had three colleges, including a Sanskrit college (1865) and a girls' school (1867) initiated under the reign of the enigmatic Maharaja Sawai Ram Singh II.

After Independence, various princely states of Rajasthan were integrated back into India. Post Independence Jaipur was made the capital of the state of Rajasthan in the year 1956.

== See also ==
- Dhundhar
