= List of milestones in Kannada literature =

This is a list of important milestones in Kannada literature starting with Kavirajamarga (850 C.E.). These writings are the earliest available works in each listed genre. Though many notable works have been accomplished in each genre during later years, these writings are the forerunners for later developments.

== The list ==
Milestones in Kannada literature
Genre	Writing	Author	Year	Patron
Poetics, Rhetoric	Kavirajamarga	Srivijaya / Amoghavarsha I	850	Rashtrakuta Empire
Basic Grammar	Kavirajamarga	Srivijaya / Amoghavarsha I	850	Rashtrakuta Empire
Narrative Prose (Parables)	Vaddaradhane	Shivakotiacharya	900	Rashtrakuta Empire
Epic (Jain)	Adipurana, Vikramarjuna Vijaya	Adikavi Pampa	941	Rashtrakuta Empire
Epic with Elegy	Sahasa Bhima Vijaya	Ranna	982	Western Chalukya Empire
Prosody	Chandombudhi	Nagavarma I	990	Western Ganga Dynasty
Fiction (Romance)	Karnataka Kadambari	Nagavarma I	990	Western Ganga
Lexicon	Rannakanda	Ranna	990	Western Chalukya
Erotics	Madanatilaka	Chandraraja	1025	Western Chalukya
Encyclopaedia	Lokopakara	Chavundaraya II	1025	Western Chalukya
Cookery	Lokopakara (Supasastra)	Chavundaraya II	1025	Western Chalukya
Agriculture	Lokopakara (Vrksayurveda)	Chavundaraya II	1025	Western Chalukya
Fable	Panchatantra	Durgasimha	1025	Western Chalukya
Free Verse (Vers Libre)	Vachana poems	Chennaiah, Kakkaiah and others	11th century	None
Bhakti poems (early native)	Vachana	Chennaiah, Kakkaiah and others	1025	None
Belles-lettres	Chandraprabha Charite	Shridaracharya	1049	Western Chalukya
Astrology	Jatakatilaka	Shridaracharya	1049	Western Chalukya
Mathematics	Vyavaharaganita, Kshetraganita, Lilavati	Rajaditya	1105	Hoysala Empire
Veterinary Science	Govaidya	Prince Kirtivarma	1120	Western Chalukya
Medicine (health)	Karnataka Kalyanakaraka	Jagadalla Somanatha	1150	Western Chalukya
Bhakti poems (mature native)	Vachana Sahitya	Basavanna and others	1160	Kalachuris of Kalyani (Southern branch)
Epic (Shaivism)	Girijakalyana	Harihara	1160	Hoysala Empire
Epic (Vaishnavism)	Jagannatha Vijaya	Rudrabhatta	1180	Hoysala Empire
Anthology	Suktisudharnava	Mallikarjuna	1245	Hoysala Empire
Mature Grammar	Shabdamanidarpana	Kesiraja	1260	Hoysala Empire
Bhakti poems (mystic, Vaishnavism)	Haridasa Sahitya	Naraharitirtha	1281	Hoysala Empire
Meteorology	Rattasutra	Rattakavi	1300	Hoysala Empire
Toxicology	Khagendramanidarpana	Mangaraja I	1360	Vijayanagara Empire
Epic (Mahabharata)	Gadugina Bharata	Naranappa (Kumara Vyasa)	1425	Vijayanagara Empire
Epic (Ramayana)	Torave Ramayana	Narahari (Kumara Valmiki)	1500	Vijayanagara Empire
Epic (native folk)	Ramanatha Charite (Kumararama Charite)	Nanjunda Kavi	1525	Vijayanagara Empire
Classical devotional	Carnatic music	Purandara Dasa	16th century	Vijayanagara Empire
Theatre (folk, Yakshagana)	Virata Parva	Vishnu Varamballi	1564	None
Drama (social)	Mitravinda Govinda	Singaraya	1680	Mysore Kingdom
Biography	Kanthirava Narasaraja Vijaya	Govinda Vaidya	1648	Mysore Kingdom
History	Chikkadevaraja Vamshavali	Tirumalarya II	1698	Mysore Kingdom
Grammar (modern)	Kannada grammar	Rev. William Carrey	1817	Princely Mysore
Novel (Historical prose)	Mudramanjusha	Kempu Narayana	1823	Princely Mysore
Dictionary (modern)	Kannada-English Dictionary	Rev. W. Reeve	1832	Princely Mysore
Journalism (news)	Mangalura Samachara	Hermann Mögling	1843	Madras Presidency
Novel (modern Romance)	Saugandhika Parinaya	Krishnaraja Wodeyar III	1850	Princely Mysore
Drama (early modern)	Shakuntala	C. Sehagiri Rao	1869	Princely Mysore
Ballad (native folk)	Sangoli Rayana Dange	John Faithfull Fleet	1874	Bombay Presidency
Drama (mature modern)	Shurasena Charite (Othello)	Basavappa Shastry	1882	Princely Mysore
Epic (early, prose)	Adbhuta Ramayana	Muddanna	1885	Princely Mysore
Mature Novel (Social)	Suryakantha	Lakshmana Gadagkar	1892	Bombay Presidency
Poem (modern)	English Geethagalu	B. M. Srikantaiah	1910	Princely Mysore
Short Stories	Kelavu Sanna Kathegalu	Masti	1920	Princely Mysore
Lyrical poems	Gari	D. R. Bendre	1936	Bombay Presidency
Epic (modern)	Sri Ramayana Darshanam	Kuvempu	1949	Mysore state
