= List of epics in the Kannada language =

This is a list of available epics in the Kannada language (also called purana, in prose or poem), a South Indian language. Based on his research, the Kannada scholar L.S. Sheshagiri Rao claims that starting with the earliest available epic Adipurana by Pampa (939 C.E), Kannada writers have created a rich and active epic tradition. S.S. Bhusanurematha's Bhavyamanava (1983) is the latest in that tradition. Based on medieval Kannada literary sources, the Indologist Anthony Warder claims there were Kannada versions of the Ramayana and Mahabharata prior to 941 C.E., and Kavya (or Mahakavya, epic poems) such as Karnataka Kumarasambhava by Asaga (c. 850). According to the Kannada scholar R. Narasimhacharya, Chandraprabhapurana by Sri Vijaya, (court poet of King Amoghavarsha I) dates to the early 9th century. This list is by no means exhaustive. In addition to the epics listed here, there are numerous epics written 'in part' (called khanda or mahatmaya) starting with the part rendering of the Skanda-purana by Kumarapadmarasa in c. 1180. According to Rao,

Though it followed the Sanskrit tradition of the Mahakavya and drew its material from Sanskrit works, even in the earliest stages, the Kannada epic was neither derivative nor imitative. It has developed the Valmiki and the Vyasa traditions in its own distinctive ways, and has, in the Jain and Virashaiva epics, presented new pictures of human greatness and destiny. In the pre-modern period, Kannada produced at least two works - Pampa Bharata (c.941) and Kumaravyasa Bharata (c.1425) - which can rank among the epics of the world.

== The list ==
Famous epics in the Kannada language
Faith	Epic	Author	Year (A.D.)	Patron
Jainism	Adipurana	Adikavi Pampa	939	Rashtrakuta Empire
Secular	Vikramarjuna Vijaya (Pampa Bharatha)	Adikavi Pampa	941	Rashtrakuta Empire
Jainism	Shantipurana	Sri Ponna	950	Rashtrakuta Empire
Jainism	Trisastilaksanamahapurana	Chamundaraya	978	Western Ganga Dynasty
Jainism	Ajitapurana	Ranna	993	Western Chalukya Empire
Secular	Saahasabhima Vijaya (Gadayuddha)	Ranna	1000	Western Chalukya Empire
Jainism	Varadhamanapurana	Nagavarma II	1042	Western Chalukya Empire
Jainism	Mallinathapurana	Nagachandra	1105	Hoysala Empire
Jainism	Ramachandracharitapurana	Nagachandra	1105	Hoysala Empire
Shaivism	Girijakalyana	Harihara	1160	Hoysala Empire
Jainism	Neminathapurana	Nemichandra	1170	Hoysala Empire
Vaishnavism	Jagannathavijaya	Rudrabhatta	1180	Hoysala Empire
Jainism	Chandraprabhapurana	Aggala	1189	Hoysala Empire
Jainism	Varadhamanapurana	Achanna	1195	Yadavas of Devagiri
Jainism	Yashodharacharite	Janna	1209	Hoysala Empire
Secular	Harishchandrakavya	Raghavanka	1220	Hoysala Empire
Shaivism	Siddharamapurana	Raghavanka	1220	Hoysala Empire
Shaivism	Somanathacharite	Raghavanka	13th century	Hoysala Empire
Shaivism	Viresvara Charita	Raghavanka	13th century	Hoysala Empire
Jainism	Ananthanathapurana	Janna	1230	Hoysala Empire
Jainism	Pushpadantapurana	Gunavarma II	1235	Hoysala Empire
Jainism	Santisvarapurana	Kamalabhava	1235	Yadavas of Devagiri
Jainism	Neminathapurana	Mahabalakavi	1254	Hoysala Empire
Jainism	Kumudendu Ramayana	Kumudendu	1275	Hoysala Empire
Jainism	Purvapurana (Adipurana)	Hastimalla	13th century	Hoysala Empire
Shaivism	Basavapurana	Bhima Kavi	1369	Vijayanagara Empire
Jainism	Dharmanathapurana	Madhura	1385	Vijayanagara Empire
Secular	Padmaraja purana	Padmananka	1385	Vijayanagara Empire
Vaishnavism	Gadugina Bharata (Kumaravyasa Bharata)	Kumaravyasa, Timmanna Kavi	1425, 1510	Vijayanagara Empire
Shaivism	Prabhulingaleele	Chamarasa	1425	Vijayanagara Empire
Shaivism	Singirajapurana (Mala-Basavarajacharita)	Singiraja	1500	Vijayanagara Empire
Shaivism	Saundara purana	Bommarasa	15th century	Vijayanagara Empire
Shaivism	Revanasiddhesvara Purana	Chaturmukha Bommarasa	1500	Vijayanagara Empire
Shaivism	Trisashti puratanara charite (Lingapurana)	Surangakavi	1500	Vijayanagara Empire
Vaishnavism	Torave Ramayana	Kumara Valmiki (Narahari)	1500	Vijayanagara Empire
Jainism	Nemi-Jinesa purana	Manjarasa III	1508	Vijayanagara Empire
Jainism	Shantinathapurana	Santikirti	1519	Vijayanagara Empire
Vaishnavism	Bhagavatha purana	Chatu Vitthalanatha	1520	Vijayanagara Empire
Secular	Ramanatha Charite (Kumararama Charite)	Nanjunda Kavi	1525	Vijayanagara Empire
Shaivism	Virasaivamritapurana	Mallanarya of Gubbi	1530	Vijayanagara Empire
Shaivism	Mahadevi Akkanapurana	Chennabasavanka	16th century	Vijayanagara Empire
Jainism	Salva Bharata	Salva	1550	Vijayanagara Empire
Jainism	Ramavijayacharitra	Devappa Kavi	1550	Vijayanagara Empire
Jainism	Chandraprabhapurana	Doddayya	1550	Vijayanagara Empire
Jainism	Bharatesha Vaibhava	Ratnakaravarni	1557	Vijayanagara Empire
Shaivism	Siddhesvarapurana	Virakta Tontadarya	1560	Vijayanagara Empire
Jainism	Chandraprabhapurana	Doddananka	1578	Vijayanagara Empire
Shaivism	Channabasavapurana	Virupaksha Pandita	1584	Vijayanagara Empire
Vaishnavism	Chamarajokti Vilasa(Ramayana)	King Chamaraja Wodeyar V	1617-1637	Mysore Kingdom
Vaishnavism	Advita Ramayana	Nijagunarya	1650	Mysore Kingdom
Vaishnavism	Bhagavatgita	Nagarasa of Pandharpur	1650	
Vaishnavism	Markandeya Ramayana	Timmarasa	1650	Mysore Kingdom
Secular	Rajashekara Vilasa	Shadaksharadeva	1655	Mysore Kingdom
Shaivism	Basavarajavijaya (Vrishabhendra Vijaya)	Shadaksharadeva	1671	Mysore Kingdom
Shaivism	Shabarashankara Vilasa	Shadaksharadeva	1671	Mysore Kingdom
Vaishnavism	Vishnupurana	Chikkaupadhyaya	1672	Mysore Kingdom
Jainism	Ramachandra Charitre	Chandrashekara, Padmanabha	1700	Mysore Kingdom
Vaishnavism	Jaiminibharata	Lakshmisha	1700	Mysore Kingdom
Vaishnavism	Ramabhyudaya-Kathakusumamanjari	Timmamatya (Timmarya)	1700	Mysore Kingdom
Vaishnavism	Bharata	Lakshmakavi	1728	Mysore Kingdom
Shaivism	Lingapurana	Kalale Nanjaraja	1732	Mysore Kingdom
Vaishnavism	Ramayana	Venkamatya	1770	Mysore Kingdom
Vaishnavism	Kaushika Ramayana	Bathaleshvara	1770	Mysore Kingdom
Vaishnavism	Shankara Ramayana	Timmanna	18th century	Mysore Kingdom
Vaishnavism	Adhyatma Ramayana	Shankaranarayana	18th century	Mysore Kingdom
Vaishnavism	Mulabala Ramayana	Haridasa	18th century	Mysore Kingdom
Jainism	Jinaramayana	Chandrasagaravarni	1810	Princely Mysore
Jainism	Ramakathavatara	Devachandra	~1838	Princely Mysore
Secular	Sangoli Rayana Dange (folk)	John Faithfull Fleet	1874	Bombay Presidency
Vaishnavism	Adbhuta Ramayana (prose)	Muddanna	1885	Princely Mysore
Vaishnavism	Shri Ramashwamedha(prose)	Muddanna	1896	Princely Mysore
Vaishnavism	Mahabharata (prose)	Alasingrachar	1912	Princely Mysore
Vaishnavism	Ramayana (prose)	Alasingrachar	1912	Princely Mysore
Vaishnavism	Mahabharata (prose)	V.K.Galaganatha	1933	Princely Mysore
Vaishnavism	Sri Ramayana Darshanam	Kuvempu	1949	Princely Mysore
Vaishnavism	Vachanabharata (prose)	A.R.Krishnashastry	1950	Princely Mysore
Vaishnavism	Ramayana (prose)	V. Sitaram Shastri	1960	Mysore state, India
Vaishnavism	Ramavatara (prose)	S. Krishna Sharma	1965	Mysore state, India
Vaishnavism	Sriramapattabhisheka	Masti Venkatesha Iyengar	1972	Mysore state, India
Secular	Bharatasindhu rashmi	V.K. Gokak	1982	Karnataka state, India
Secular	Bhavyamanava	S.S.Bhusanurematha	1983	Karnataka state, India

Extinct epics in the Kannada language known from quotes and references by later writers
Faith	Epic	Author	Year	Patron
Jainism	Chandraprabhapurana	Srivijaya	early 9th century	Rashtrakuta Empire
Jainism	Karnata Kumarasambhava	Asaga	853	Rashtrakuta Empire
Jainism	Harivamsha (Neminathapurana)	Gunavarma I	900	Western Ganga Dynasty
Jainism	Shudraka	Gunavarma I	900	Western Ganga Dynasty
Secular	Bhuvanaika-Ramabhyudaya (Ramakatha)	Sri Ponna	950	Rashtrakuta Empire
Jainism	Parasurama Charita	Ranna	980-990	Western Ganga Dynasty
Jainism	Chakreshvara Charita	Ranna	980-990	Western Ganga Dynasty
Jainism	ShantinathaPurana	Ranna	980-990	Western Ganga Dynasty
Shaivism	Hariharamahatva	Raghavanka	early 13th century	Hoysala Empire
Shaivism	Sharabacharite	Raghavanka	early 13th century	Hoysala Empire

== See also ==
- Lists of Manipuri epics
