= Antarikṣa Pārśvanātha Tīrtha =

Jain temple in Maharashtra, India

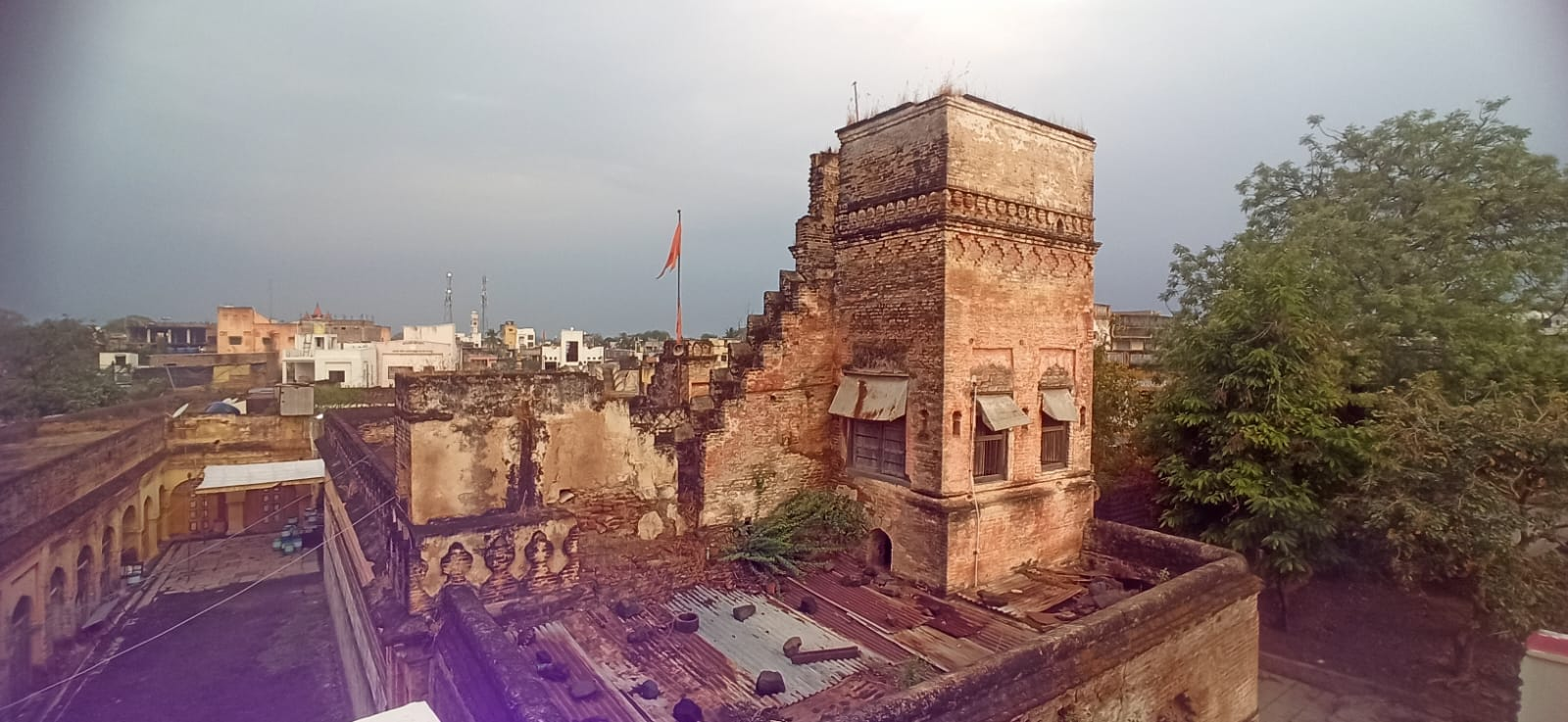
- Antarikṣa Pārśvanātha Tīrtha Main Temple

- Location of Antarikṣa Pārśvanātha Tīrtha in Maharashtra

Religion
- Affiliation: Jainism
- Sect: Jain
- Deity: Parshvanatha
- Festivals: Mahavir Janma Kalyanak, Pausha Dashami, Parshvanatha's Moksha Kalyanaka
- Governing body: Śrī Antarikṣa Pārśvanātha Jain Trust

Location
- Location: Shirpur, Akola district, Maharashtra, India
- Administration: Śrī Antarikṣa Pārśvanātha Jain Trust
- Coordinates: 20.17°N 76.96°E

Architecture
- Temple: 4
- Inscriptions: 1

Antarikṣa Pārśvanātha Tīrtha is a Jain temple in Shirpur (Jain) town in Akola district, Maharashtra, India. Most popular for the main deity which is supposedly a 'floating' black-colored idol of Parshvanatha, the 23rd Tirthankara, this temple has been a center of devotion for Jains as well as of disputes between the Digambara and Śvetāmbara sect of Jainism. The main deity at this temple is one of the 108 most prominent idols of Pārśvanātha worshipped by Śvetāmbaras, and is also very sacred to Digambaras.

== Traditional beliefs ==
Several legends are associated with this idol and the ancient structure it is housed in. According to Acharya Jinaprabhasuri's Vividha Tirtha Kalpa, the idol is believed to have had been carved out of cow dung and sand by King Khara, Ravana's sister's husband. This idol, as per traditional beliefs, is said to be the 3rd oldest idol in the universe after Neminatha's idol at Girnar Jain temples and Parshvanatha's idols at Shankheshwar Jain Temple.

As per Vividha Tirtha Kalpa, later on, King Śrīpāla of Achalpur was cured of an illness after consuming water from a well. With the help of Dharanendra, a demi-god, Śrīpāla recovered this idol which was immersed in the well from which he drank water. He was asked not to look back at the chariot he was transporting the idol in. However, against Dharnendra's advice, he looked back and the idol froze at the said spot, midway in air in Shirpur. In 1142 CE, the idol was consecrated by Jain ascetic Ācārya Abhaydevasuri there itself. It is said that since the idol floated above the ground at the time of this consecration ceremony, the name Antarikṣa Pārśvanātha (transl. floating idol of Pārśvanātha) was coined.

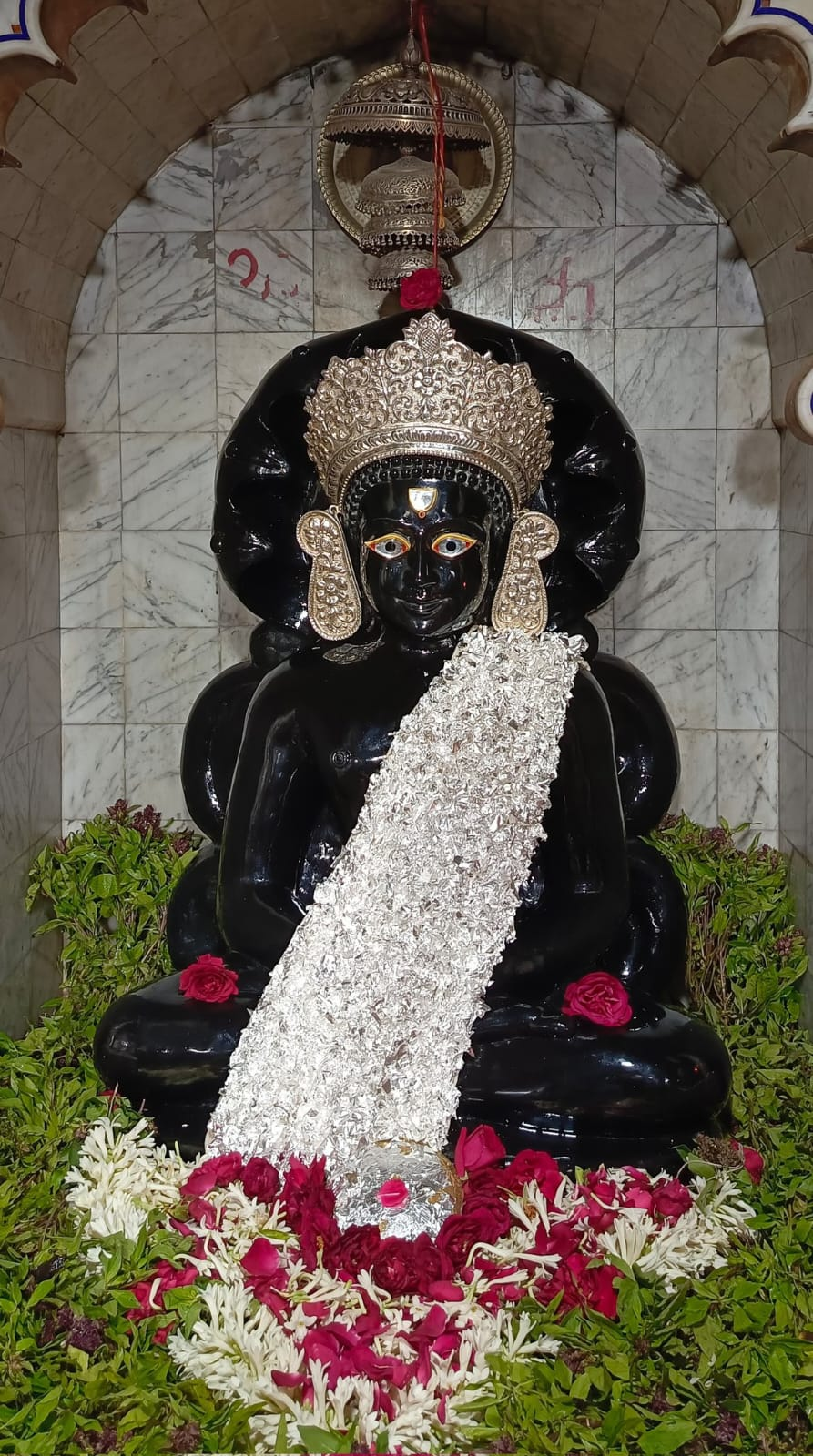
The idol of Antarikṣa Pārśvanātha during Śvetāmbara rituals

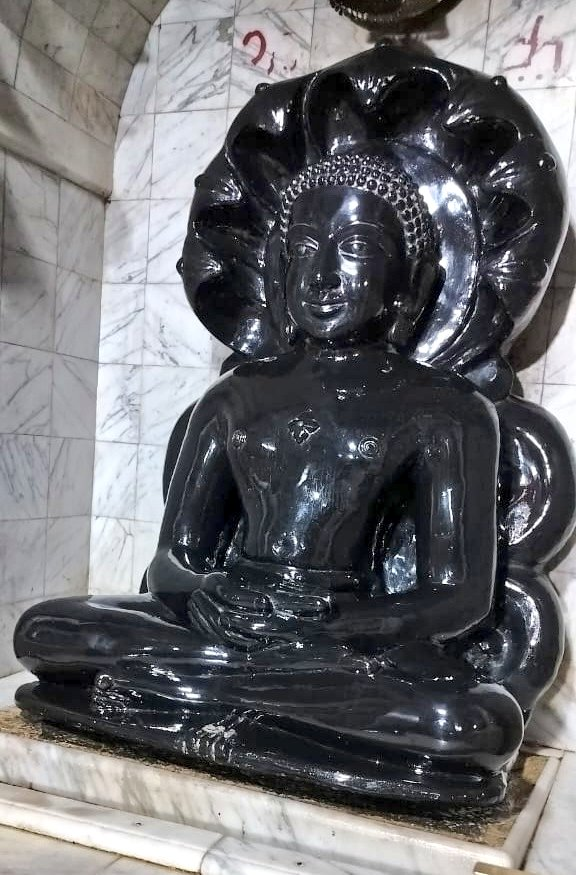
The idol of Antarikṣa Pārśvanātha during Digambara rituals

A 17th-century hymn, Śrī Antarikṣa Pārśvanātha Stotra and Acharya Bhuvantilaksuri's Antariksh Mahatmya state that Śvetāmbara ascetic Ganivarya Bhavavijaya recovered his lost eyesight by writing and singing a hymn dedicated to this idol. The literary piece also mentions that the temple was renovated after idol was consecrated again under his guidance.

== Early history ==
Both the Digambaras and Śvetāmbaras claim the ownership of the main deity, which has been a matter of several legal disputes between the two sects at least since 1850s.

A 1406 CE inscription mentions that a person named Jagasimha donated the land to build this temple in Shirpur (Jain). It is suspected he was possibly the Chalukyan king Jayasimha Siddharaja. In 1649 CE, many newly sculpted idols were installed by Śvetāmbara Jain ascetic Acharya Devsuri of the Tapa Gaccha. It was conducted by Amichand, a Śrāvaka from Aurangabad. Śrī Antarikṣa Pārśvanātha Stotra by Ganivarya Bhavavijaya also mentions that the idol was reinstalled and the temple was renovated in 1658 CE.

Due to the migration of Jains out of villages, in the late 17th century CE, the Maratha Confederacy reportedly appointed Polkars, a Marathi-speaking Hindu clan to maintain and protect the temple from attacks by the Mughal Empire. The temple was renovated again in 1867 CE and the idol supposedly floated only one finger above ground then.

In 1877 CE, a silver pole was installed at the temple by the Śvetāmbara Jain community. While The Imperial Gazetteer of India published that it was a Digambara temple, Bombay High Court, in the case Yadarao Dajiba Shrawane vs. Nanilal Harakchand Shah (2002) stated that ownership and title was not subject to decision based on reports by the Imperial Gazetteer of India. Later, in the same case, the Supreme Court of India passed an order stating that the Śvetāmbara community had an exclusive right to manage the temple as well as the disputed idol.

"We are inclined to think that the use of the historical works to establish title to the property cannot be justified on the strength of Section 57 of the Indian Evidence Act. The question of title between the trustee of a mosque, though an old and historical institution, and a private person, cannot, in our opinion, be deemed to be a "matter of public history" within the meaning of the said Section. These statements in the Gazetteer are not relied on as evidence of title but as providing historical material and practice followed by the Math and its head. The Gazetteers can be consulted on matters of public history."

- Bombay High Court in Yadarao Dajiba Shrawane vs. Nanilal Harakchand Shah, referring to Farzand Ali vs. Zafar Ali and Mahant Shri Srinivas Ramanydas vs. Suraj Narayan Das[9]

== History of the dispute ==
By early 1900s, Polkars started to claim ownership of the temple due to the absence of Śvetāmbara residents in the town. Śvetāmbara trustees residing in nearby towns sought assistance from Digambaras to legally fight against Polkars. Digambaras and Śvetāmbaras united and sued Polkars in a district court in 1901 to reclaim the ownership of the temple from Polkars. In 1903, the court ruled in favor of the Śvetāmbara trustees, also known as the Jain panchas. The court called for a settlement between Jains and Polkars emphasizing that even though they were not the rightful owners, the court could not repeal their employment rights and ruled: -

1. Four Polkars would be employed for maintenance of the temple.
2. Each of them would be paid INR 261 a year for their service.
3. All currency deposited in the temple would be the property of Śrī Antarikṣa Pārśvanātha Mahārāja Saṃsthāna, a Śvetāmbara trust, except any currency between INR 1 and INR 10 which would be given to Polkars.

By 1905-06, clashes between devotees of both sects increased due to ritualistic differences with respect to the worshipping of idols. Several meetings culminated into an agreement: -

1. Four time slots were decided (3 hour-long each), with 2 for each sect to perform religious rituals before the idol as per their customs.
2. During the 8 days of Paryushana celebrated by Śvetāmbaras, all slots except one were given to Śvetāmbaras. Similar policy was applied to Digambaras during the Digambara celebration of Das-Lakshana.
3. During Naraka Chaturdashi, Śvetāmbaras had a single slot and the rest were for the Digambaras. The reverse happened on Diwali.
4. Praying without worshipping through offerings was permitted for devotees of both the sects throughout the day.

On 12 February 1908, with permission from Digambaras, Śvetāmbaras started plastering the idol as per tradition, to repair and protect it from damage. Digambaras alleged that the artisan made additions of lower waist-cloth and that this was not authorized by them. Śvetāmbaras worshipped a clothed idol. However, Digambaras only worshipped a nude idol without jewelry. Severe damage was inflicted upon the idol after an enraged mob from the Digambara community forcibly used metallic instruments and objects to remove the carving of the lower waist-cloth on 13 February 1908. The situation escalated and Śvetāmbaras filed a case for exclusive control of the temple citing the danger Digambaras pose to the idol. Śvetāmbaras produced over 600 evidences including jewelry for the idol that was gifted to the temple trust. In response to the case, in March 1908, Digambaras filed a counter-appeal claiming full ownership of the temple and that Śvetāmbaras had wrongly filed a case. They also said that full ownership could not be given to Śvetāmbaras due to the 1905 agreement between both the sects.

On 11 February 1910, Akola's Additional District Judge delivered a judgment: -

1. The idol belonged to the Śvetāmbaras.
2. Even though the rightful owner was established to be the Śvetāmbara sect, absolute ownership could not be given to any of the two sects due to the 1905 agreement.
3. The lower waist-cloth was already carved over the idol before the plastering began in 1908 and that it was not added later as insinuated by Digambaras.
4. No arrests could be made for damaging the idol because the perpetrator had not been identified.
5. Both the sects must be obliged to observe the particulars of the 1905 agreement.
6. Śvetāmbaras were fully permitted to perform the necessary plastering of the idol and worship it with jewelry as per their rituals and customs.
7. Digambaras were restrained from obstructing or objecting to the process of plastering of the idol by Śvetāmbaras.

In response to the appeal filed by Śvetāmbaras on 17 July 1918, the Judicial Commissioner of Nagpur High Court passed an order giving the ownership and the exclusive right to manage the temple and the full right to worship as per their customs to the Śvetāmbaras. Digambaras were allowed to worship as per the 1905 agreement and without ornaments and jewelry as per their own customs. However, they were not permitted to remove the lower waist-cloth and were permanently restrained from interfering with the process of plastering by Śvetāmbaras. Śvetāmbara ascetic Acharya Sagaranandsuri was subjected to attacks and insults, but reportedly, he forgave the perpetrators and was honored by a British judge for this move.

"We declare that the Swetambaris are entitled to the exclusive management of the temple and the image of Shri Antariksha Parshwanath Maharaj at Kasbe Shirpur, with Katisutra, Kardora and Lape, and that they have the right to worship that image with Chakshu, Tika and Mugut and to put ornaments over the same in accordance with their custom. That the Digambaris have a right of worshipping the image in accordance with the arrangement made in 1905 without Chakshu, Tika and Mugut or ornaments, but are not to remove or interfere with the Kachota, Katisutra and Lape; we also declare that the Digambari Sect are permanently restrained from obstructing the Swetambari Sect in getting the image restored to its original form adorned with the Kachota, Katisutra and plastering the same now and hereafter. In supersession of the lower Court's decree, a decree as above will now be passed. The cross objections are dismissed. As regards costs, we think it proper that each party should bear its cost."

- Judicial Commissioner, Nagpur[9]

In 1923, Digambaras appealed the order in the Privy Council. As per the directions of the Judicial Commissioner of Nagpur High Court, Śvetāmbaras had begun the process of plastering the idol by then. Digambaras demanded a stay order, which the court refused. After plastering of the idol was completed, members of the Digambara community reportedly poured 'boiling hot' milk over the idol, which damaged the plaster. On 9 July 1929, the Privy Council, in response to the appeal by Digambaras, rejected it and held that order passed by the Judicial Commissioner of Nagpur High Court was to be followed and that the temple as well as the idol were to continue to be managed by Śvetāmbaras.

"In the result, the Appellate Court declared and held that the Shwetambaris were, in the facts found, entitled to the exclusive management of the temple. On full consideration of the whole case their Lordships have reached the conclusion that the decree is right. In the result, therefore, the appeal fails and their Lordships will humbly advice His Majesty that it be dismissed with costs. Their Lordships will further humbly advice His Majesty that a petition lodged by the appellants for a stay of execution of the decree of the Judicial Commissioner be also dismissed with costs."

- Privy Council in Honasa Ramasa Lad Dhakad vs. Kalyanchand Lalchand Patni Gujrathi[13]

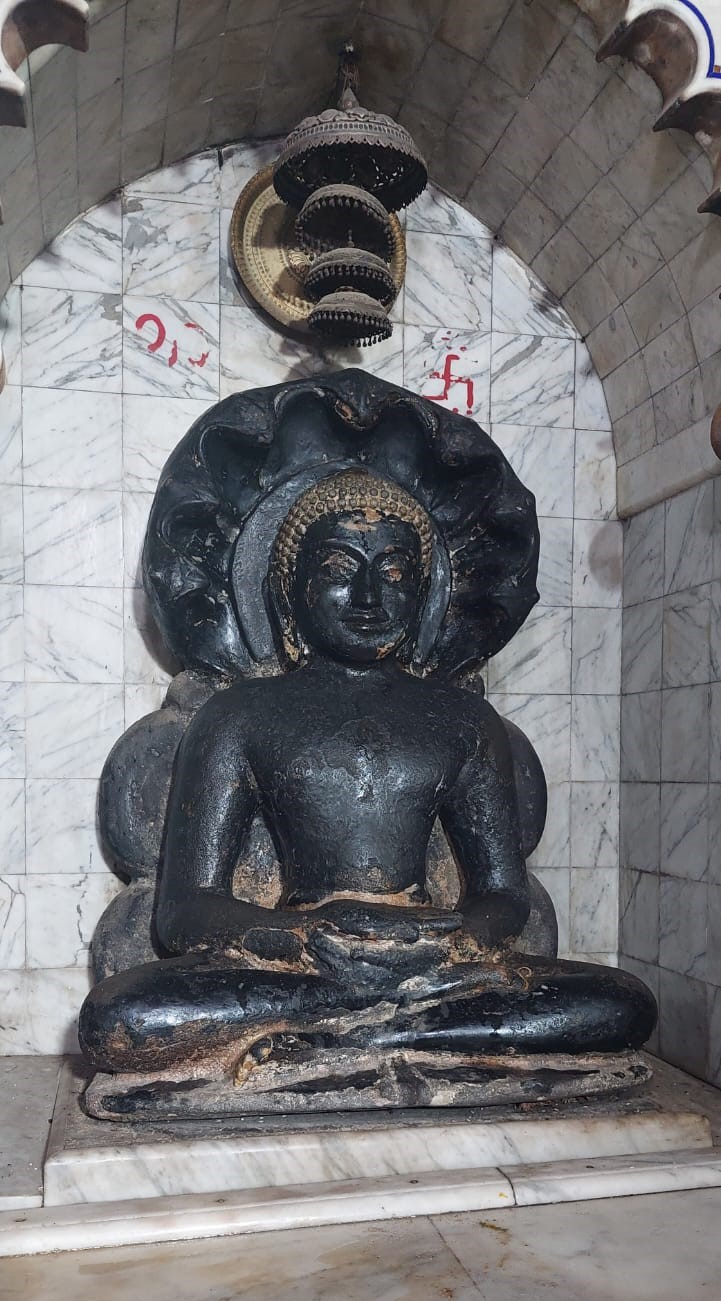
The damaged idol of Antarikṣa Pārśvanātha after violent means to remove the plaster were used

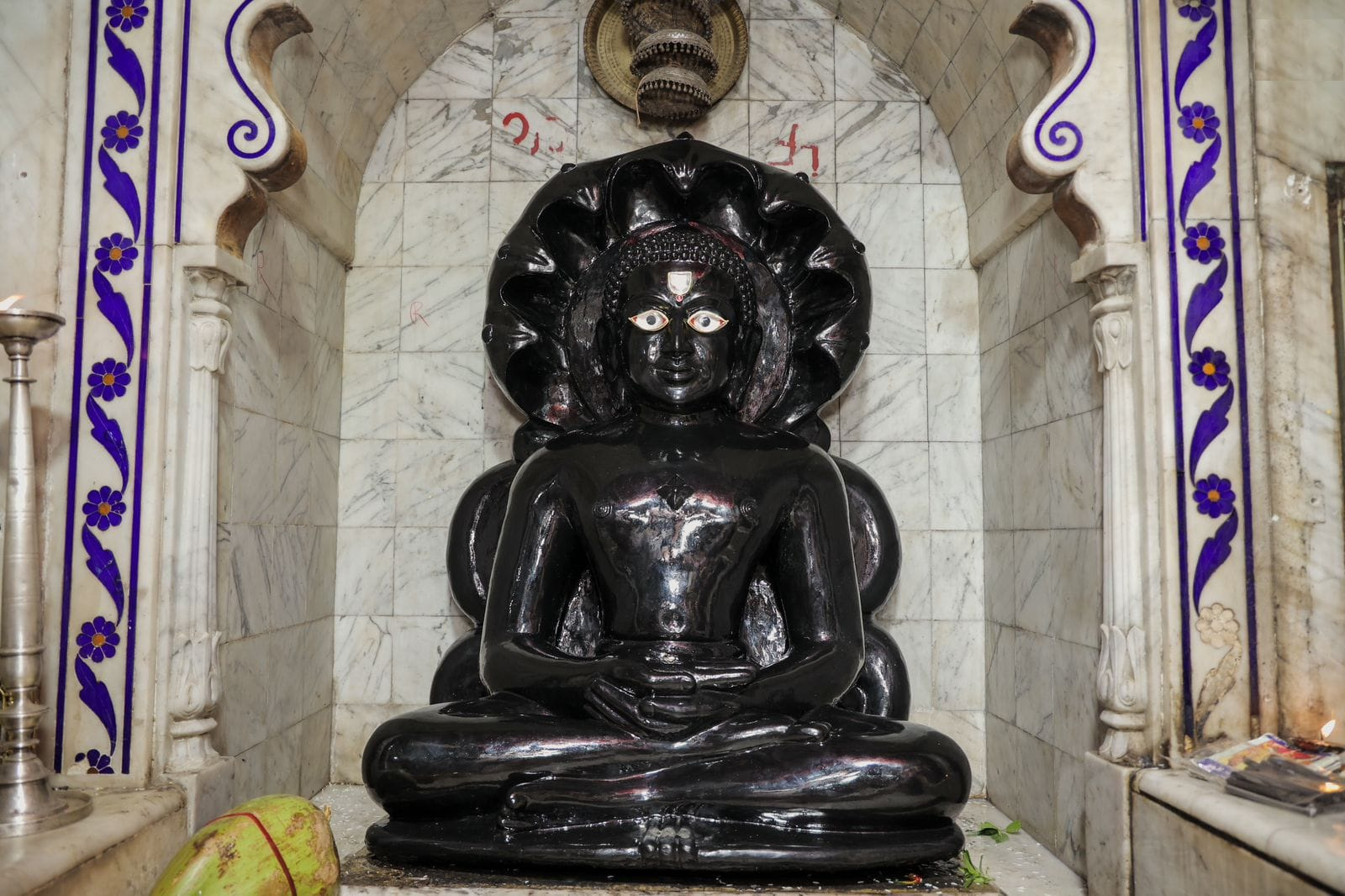
The idol of Antarikṣa Pārśvanātha

In 1934, Śvetāmbaras initiated the process of restoring the damaged idol. Digambaras filed an appeal against it in Akola Court, which dismissed the appeal. Digambaras moved to the High Court, which ruled that Akola Court was to direct on the size of the lower waist-cloth. On 11 January 1937, Justice R.V. Paranjpe visited the temple and tried to scratch the idol using his nails. On witnessing a sand-like mixture in his nails, he concluded that the idol was certainly not made of stone as believed by Digambaras and that the necessity for plastering this idol was obvious.

On 13 September 1944, Akola Court decided the size of the lower waist-cloth. It declared that the authority to decide on when would plastering begin rested with Śvetāmbaras and Digambaras were not permitted to object to it. Digambaras were further restrained from making any ritualistic offerings before the plaster was completely dry. When the process was begun by Śvetāmbaras in 1944, Digambaras filed another case in Nagpur High Court, stating that the plaster was not required as the idol was made of stone and not a mixture of sand and cow-dung as believed by Śvetāmbaras. On 8 July 1947, Justice R.T. Pollock, a British judge, ruled that Śvetāmbaras were allowed to perform plastering and the previous order was to be honored by Digambaras as well. He further stated that Digambaras were only trying to delay the plastering. The court ordered Digambaras to pay reparations to Śvetāmbaras with respect to the expense made by them in the proceedings of this case. Digambaras then filed an appeal in the Nagpur High Court, which refused to hear the plea. Between 3 October 1948 and 13 November 1948. Śvetāmbaras completed the process of plastering of the idol.

In 1959, there arose a need to replaster the idol due to deterioration of the old plaster with time. Removal of plaster was performed under careful invigilation of a retired judge and one member from each of the two sects. According to Śvetāmbaras, the plaster was sufficiently removed at a point. However, Digambaras said that the process must go on, so that it could be proved that the idol is nude and made up of stone instead of sand and cow-dung. This allegation led to violent disputes, after which, the government put the idol inside a cage to protect it from damage due to the violence.

In 1960, Digambaras filed a plea in a Civil Court to stop the process of replastering and to proclaim that Śvetāmbaras had obtained Privy Council's support through unlawful means. Later, both the sects instituted a 5-member committee to visit the temple and guide on further course of action. Three visits were conducted, one each in July 1967, October 1967, and February 1968. By their third visit, they noted that Digambaras had placed several new idols which were not present at the time of their first visit. These idols were not consecrated and cemented, and were reportedly only placed to influence the committee. However, they tried to spread the narrative that the idols were present since ancient times, the committee did not accept their views. They also observed that Digambaras had scribbled and declared their ownership on the temple's walls, against the Privy Council's directions. The idol of Padmavati was also displaced.

In 1977, Digambaras filed a plea in Bombay High Court to completely deplaster the idol, while Śvetāmbaras responded by saying that Digambaras planned to convert the temple which was unlawful as per the Places of Worship Act. On 22 April 1981, replastering was resumed. However, extremely violent clashes between members of both sects prompted the government to seal the temple. On 18 May 1981, goons attacked a group of Śvetāmbara nuns staying at a dharmaśālā owned by Śvetāmbaras. Two days later, a similar attack occurred, but was prevented due to police protection. The goons were reportedly sent to vacate and illegally occupy the Śvetāmbara dharmaśālā by Digambaras. The matter of unprecedented violence against Śvetāmbaras, Śvetāmbara monks and nuns, and discrimination against Śvetāmbaras by local police was also taken up for discussion in the Lok Sabha on 18 September 1981, by Ratansinh Rajda, the then Member of Parliament, Lok Sabha.

On 8 March 2007, Bombay High Court ruled that findings proved that the idol had the lower waist-cloth on 15 August 1947. Therefore, according to Places of Worship (Special Provisions) Act, 1991, demands by the Digambara sect to remove the plaster were unlawful and illegal. On 5 April 2007, the matter was recommended to the Supreme Court of India.

After 17 years of hearing, the Supreme Court of India passed an interim order on 22 February 2023 which gave management rights of the temple and idol exclusively to Śvetāmbaras. Further, the court permitted Śvetāmbaras to perform plastering of the idol necessary to protect it from further damage. It also permitted the Digambara sect to worship the idol without making any changes in the plaster of the idol. Worshipping was permitted as per the agreement made between Śvetāmbaras and Digambaras in 1905.

"Consequently, the interim order dated 05.04.2007, passed by this court, is modified in the following terms:

(i) The management of the temple and the idol shall be that of the Shwetambari sect, subject to the final outcome of this appeal;

(ii) The Digambari sect will be allowed to worship the idol as per the agreement entered into between the parties in 1905 but without changing the character of the idol; and

(iii) The Shwetambari sect will be at liberty to carry out necessary plaster (lep) on the idol to prevent any wear and tear of the idol and for the purpose of maintenance and proper upkeep of the same."

- Supreme Court of India in Manikchand vs. Sakarchand S/O Premchand Gujrathi[28]

Following the court's orders, on 11 March 2023 the keys of the temple were handed over to Sakarchand Shah of the Śvetāmbara sect and the temple was reopened after 42 years of litigation. Śrī Antarikṣa Pārśvanātha Mahārāja Saṃsthāna, the managing trust of the temple, proceeded with performing the necessary plastering of the idol. An official notice was issued by the trust, stating that the temple would not open until the plastering and necessary repairs in the ancient structure were completed.

Plastering was to begin, when a mob from Digambara sect forcefully broke into the temple on 14 March 2023, when it was closed for plastering. They, reportedly, entered on the stating their wish to worship other idols. No action was taken by the police. Due to this, the already scheduled plastering process had to be delayed. Later, the Digambara sect appealed to the Supreme Court to issue an injunction on its order. On 18 March 2023, violent clashes happened between devotees of both sects, which continued on 1h March 2023. Devotees of the Śvetāmbara sect sustained severe injuries due to attack by objects such as iron rods and bricks.

To end the violent turmoil, ascetics and members of Śvetāmbara community proposed an agreement, based on which, it was mutually agreed by both the and decided that the plastering would begin on 23 March 2023. The first round of plastering concluded on 30 March 2023. On 5 April 2023, the Supreme Court of India passed an order on the injunction application made by the Digambara sect. The court did not pass any injunction and allowed the repairs of the temple to happen under the district administrator's supervision. The second and third rounds of plastering were completed by 18 April 2023, and on 29 May 2023 respectively.

After plastering concluded on 20 June 2023, the Śvetāmbara trust gave the first chance to worship the idol to the Digambara community. Digambaras performed worshipping as per their rituals. On 21 June 2023, Śvetāmbaras performed 18 abhiṣeka (ritualistic bathing of the idol with eighteen different types of medicinal fluids) on the idol. Śvetāmbaras all over the world celebrated the reopening of the temple through bhāv-yātrā (transl. visiting a pilgrimage through imagination, backed by devotional music).

== In literature ==
Several Śvetāmbara texts mention Antarikṣa Pārśvanātha: -

1. Vividha Tirtha Kalpa (14th century)
2. Śrī Antarikṣa Pārśvanātha Chanda (15th century)
3. Upadeśataraṅgiṇī (16th century)
4. Śrī Antarikṣa Pārśvanātha Stotra (17th century)
5. Sakala Tīrtha Vandanā (18th century)
6. Hīrasaubhāgya Mahākāvya (17th century)
7. Caturviṃśati Jina Stuti
8. Puruṣādāni Pārśvadevanām Mālā
9. Gurjar Kāvya Sañcaya
10. Prācīnā Tīrtha Mālā Saṅgraha
11. Tīrthamālā

Apart from the above, some Digambara scriptures such as the 14th century text Nirvān Kānd, and those written by Bhattarakas mention this pilgrimage site.

Yashovijaya had composed two hymns dedicated to Antarikṣa Pārśvanātha. Anandghan, a Śvetāmbara ascetic known for composing musical hymns, also composed several hymns dedicated to the idol of Antarikṣa Pārśvanātha.

Acharya Kalyansagarsuri, a 16th-century Śvetāmbara ascetic, wrote a comprehensive ritual of worshipping the idol of Antarikṣa Pārśvanātha, which also hints at the fact that the Śvetāmbara sect worshipped the idol at least since 16th century.

Śabdon Ke Śikhara, a scripture written by Rajendrasuri, describes the temple and the idol.

== Other temples nearby ==
Near the ancient disputed temple, an undisputed Śvetāmbara temple, as well as the Digambara Jain Pavali Temple are situated. Śvetāmbaras recently consecrated another pilgrimage site near the ancient disputed temple taking the total number of temples to 4.
