= International Journal of Jaina Studies =

- Discipline: Jainism
- Language: English

Publication details
- History: 2005 to present
- Publisher: School of Oriental and African Studies, University of London (United Kingdom)

Standard abbreviations
- ISO 4: Int. J. Jaina Stud.

Indexing
- ISSN: 1748-1074 (print); 1748-1074 (web)

Links
- Journal homepage

The International Journal of Jaina Studies is an open access, peer reviewed journal published by the School of Oriental and African Studies at the University of London since 2005.
