= Nalini Balbir =

French Indologist (born 1955)

- Born: May 27, 1955. Lormont, France
- Education: Paris-Sorbonne University); Goethe-Institut Munich
- Alma mater: University of Paris III: Sorbonne Nouvelle
- Awards: Prix Emile Sénart of the Académie des Inscriptions et Belles-Lettres (1986)
- Scientific career
- Fields: Indo-Aryan languages, sanskrit, pali, prakrit, apabhramsha
- Institutions: École Pratique des Hautes Études, Paris
- Thesis: Etudes d'exégèse jaina: les Āvaśyaka (1986)
- Website: nalini.balbir@ephe.sorbonne.fr

Nalini Balbir (born 1955) is a French Indologist who lives in Paris. She is a scholar of Sanskrit, Prakrit, Pali, Jainism, Buddhism and Hinduism. She was previously a student of Indologist Colette Caillat. She is known for her work on the publication of the Catalogue of the Jain Manuscripts of the British Library published by the Institute of Jainology.

== Biography ==
Nalini Balbir was born of a French mother and an Indian father. She started her career as a teacher of French, Latin and Greek in secondary schools (1977 to 1980), before completing her PhD in Indian Studies (Études indiennes) with the edition and annotated translation of the Danastaka-katha, a book of Jain narratives in Sanskrit, which was published in 1982. Between 1982 and 1988 she was a Research scholar in the Centre national de la recherche scientifique, where she completed her DLitt in Indian Studies with a magisterial work on the complex Jaina Avasyaka literature which was published in 1993 under the title Avasyaka Studien. In recognition of her outstanding contributions to classical and modern Indian philology she became Professor of Indian Studies at the Sorbonne Nouvelle (University of New Sorbonne) in 1988. Dr Balbir is currently Professor for Indian Studies (Études Indiennes) at the Sorbonne Nouvelle (University of Paris-3), and since the year 2000 also Directeur d'Études for Middle-Indian Philology at the École Pratique des Hautes Études in Paris (Section des Sciences historiques et philologiques). As a trained philologist, her main areas of research are Sanskrit, Pali, Prakrit, Theravada Buddhism, Jainism, and Hindi language and literature of the 20th century. She is also a member of Pali text society in London and editor since 1983 of Bulletin d'Études Indiennes, an Indology Journal.

== Publications ==
- Balbir, N. (1983). Prakrit versions of a Pan-Indian tale; the Monkey and the Tailor-bird, and their use in Jaina Books of discipline. OCLC Number: 469255352
- Balbir, N. (1984). "Normalizing trends in Jaina narrative literature." Indologica Taurinensia 12 (1984): 25–38. OCLC Number: 469255335
- Balbir, N., Oberlies, T., & Leumann, E. (1993). Āvaśyaka-Studien. Alt- und neu-indische Studien, 45, 1–2. Stuttgart: Franz Steiner. ISBN 3-515-06149-5, ISBN 978-3-515-06149-0 OCLC Number: 30675632
- Renou, L., Balbir, N., & Pinault, G.-J. (1997). [1. Védique et sanskrit - 2. Tradition grammaticale]. Choix d'études indiennes / Louis Renou. Réunis par Nalini Balbir et Georges-Jean Pinault, Tome 1. Paris: École Française d'Extrême-Orient. OCLC Number: 246231389
- British Library (London), & Balbir, N. (2006). Catalogue of the Jain manuscripts of the British Library 1 Vol. 1 Introduction, bibliography, appendices, indexes, plates. ISBN 0-7123-4711-9, ISBN 978-0-7123-4711-2 OCLC Number: 263433372
- Caillat, C., & Balbir, N. (2008). Jaina Studies. Papers of the 12th World Sanskrit Conference. Delhi: Motilal Banarsidass. ISBN 978-81-208-3247-3, ISBN 81-208-3247-7 OCLC Number: 470840899
- Balbir, N., & Pinault, G.-J. (2009). Penser, dire et représenter l'animal dans le monde Indien. Paris: Champion. ISBN 978-2-7453-1903-6, ISBN 2-7453-1903-5 OCLC Number: 406150083
- Acarya Nemicandra; Nalini Balbir (2010). DRAVYASAMGRAHA. (in Prakrit and English) Pandit Nathuram Premi Research Series. Mumbai: Hindi Granth Karyalay. ISBN 978-81-88769-30-8.
- Nalini Balbir (2013). Assimil: Le Sanskrit (in French). Paris: Assimil. ISBN 9782700580433.
