= Virasena =

Indian mathematician and Jain scholar (750–825)

Acharya Shri Virasena Ji Maharaj
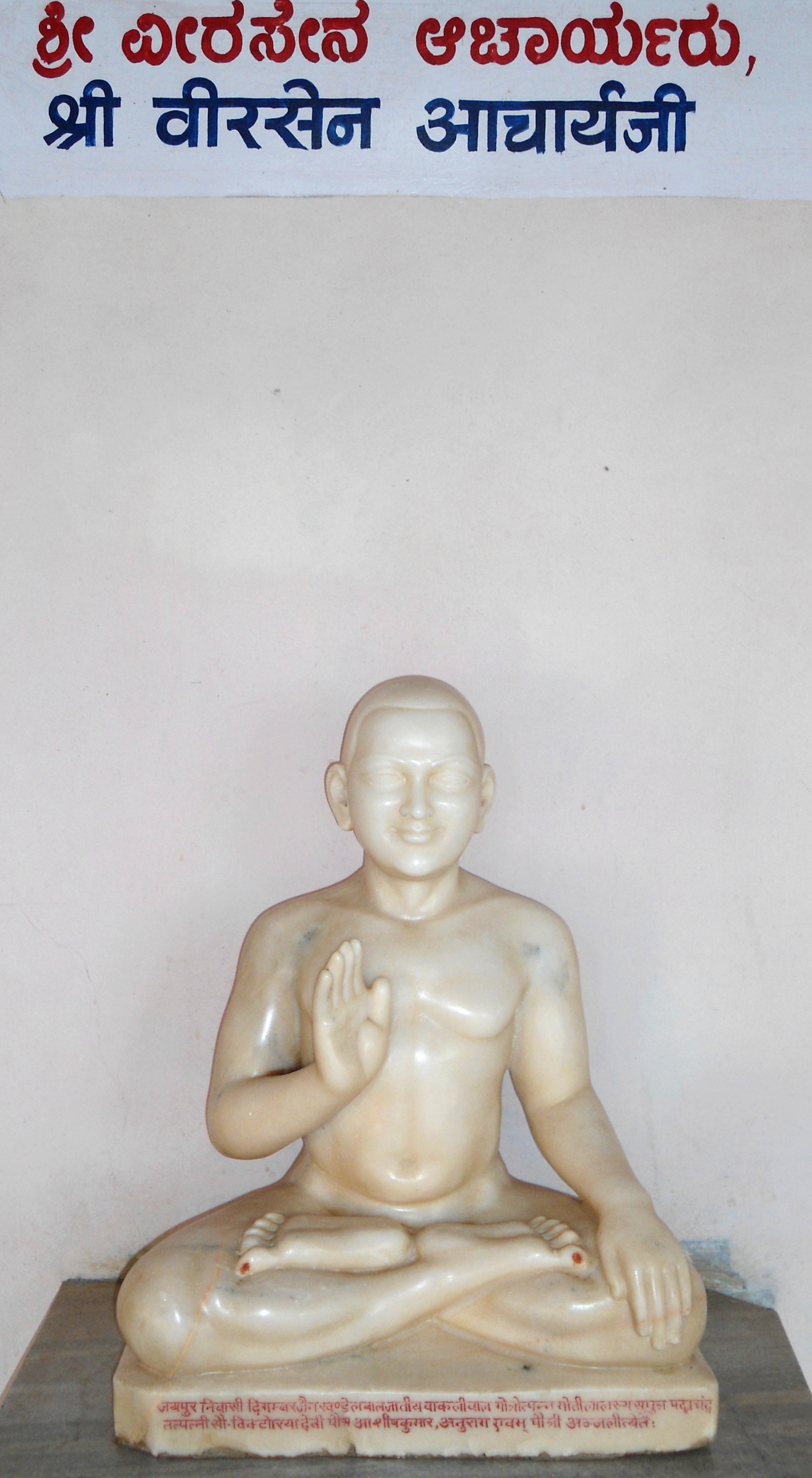
- Acharya Virasena

Personal life
- Born: 750
- Died: 825
- Notable work: Dhavala

Religious life
- Religion: Jainism
- Sect: Digambara

Religious career
- Teacher: Aryanandi
- Predecessor: Aryanandi
- Successor: Jinasena
- Disciples: Jinasena, Dasharayaguru, Vinayasena, Shripal, Padmasena, Devasena, Kumudendu Muni

Acharya Virasena (750–825 CE), also spelt as Veerasena, was a Jain monk and belonged to the lineage of Acharya Kundakunda. He was an Indian mathematician and Jain philosopher and scholar of Digambar sect. He was also known as a famous orator and an accomplished poet. He is renowned for his work on the monumental Jain commentary series on the ''Shatkhandagama'', known as the ''Dhavala'' texts. Dr. Hiralal Jain places the completion of this treatise in 816. He played a critical role in the development of Digambara scholasticism and is considered one of the greatest Jain scholars of early medieval India.

== Life ==
Virasena was a disciple of the Jain acharya Aryanandi and flourished during the Rashtrakuta King Dhruva Dharavarsha and Govinda III. He was based in the Deccan region and attracted several prominent disciples, including Jinasena I and Gunasena, later known as Jinasena II.

Virasena was proficient in astrology, grammar, logic, mathematics and prosody. He wrote Dhavala, a commentary on Jain canon Shatakhandagama. He also started the work on Jayadhavalaa which was completed by his disciples. He was among the jewels of Rashtrakuta Emperor Dhruva dharavarsha and Govinda III, it is also says that he also present at the time of Amoghavarsha.

His lineage started with Chandrasena who initiated Aryanandi. Aryanandi initiated Virasena and Jayasena. Virasena initiated six disciples who were Dasharayguru, Jinasena, Vinayasena, Shripal, Padmasena and Devasena. Dasharayguru and Jinasena initiated Gunabhadra who later initiated Lokasena. Vinayasena initiated Kumarasena who started the Kashtha Sangha.

== Works ==
=== Dhavala and Related Texts ===
Virasena is primarily known for initiating the commentary project on the Shatkhandagama, one of the most revered canonical texts in Digambara Jainism. This massive commentary is collectively referred to as the Dhavala series, and it includes:

- Dhavala
- Jayadhavala
- Mahadhavala

While Virasena began the Dhavala, he was unable to complete it in his lifetime. The work was carried forward by his disciples Jinasena II (Gunasena) and others.

These texts are not only commentaries but also rich repositories of Jain philosophy, cosmology, and metaphysics.

== Mathematics ==
Virasena was a noted mathematician. He gave the derivation of the volume of a frustum by a sort of infinite procedure. He worked with the concept of ardhachheda: the number of times a number can be divided by 2. This coincides with the binary logarithm when applied to powers of two, but gives the 2-adic order rather than the logarithm for other integers.

Virasena gave the approximate formula C = 3d + (16d+16)/113 to relate the circumference of a circle, C, to its diameter, d. For large values of d, this gives the approximation π ≈ 355/113 = 3.14159292..., which is more accurate than the approximation π ≈ 3.1416 given by Aryabhata in the Aryabhatiya.

== Disciples ==
Virasena mentored several disciples who carried forward his intellectual legacy: • Jinasena: Author of the Adi Purana, an epic Jain text on Rishabhanatha and Bharata.Gunasena (Jinasena II): Successor of Jinasena I, and co-author of the Dhavala commentary series.

== See also ==
- Indian mathematics
- Umaswami
- Hemachandra
- Shatkhandagama
- Jainism in Karnataka
- Rashtrakuta literature

== Bibliography ==
- Jain, Pannalal, ed. (1951), Mahapurana Adipurana of Bhagavata Jinasenacharya, Bharatiya Jnanapitha
- Jaini, Padmanabh S. (1991), Gender and Salvation: Jaina Debates on the Spiritual Liberation of Women, University of California Press, ISBN 0-520-06820-3
- Shah, Natubhai (2004) [First published in 1998], Jainism: The World of Conquerors, vol. I, Motilal Banarsidass, ISBN 81-208-1938-1
- Cort, John E. Framing the Jina: Narratives of Icons and Idols in Jain History. Oxford University Press, 2010. ISBN 978-0-19-538502-1.
- Dundas, Paul. The Jains. 2nd ed., Routledge, 2002. ISBN 9780415305940.
- Jaini, Padmanabh S. The Jaina Path of Purification. University of California Press, 1979. ISBN 9780520039944.
- Upadhye, A.N. "Virasena and the Dhavala Tradition". In Studies in Jaina History and Culture, ed. P.S. Jaini, Motilal Banarsidass, 1999.
