= Siddalakona =

Temple in India

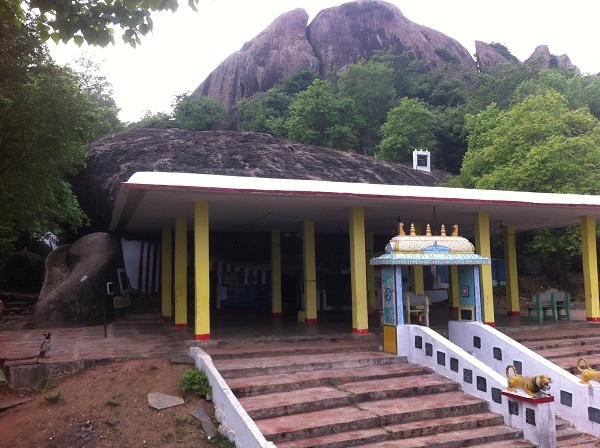
- Siddalakona Rock Cave at Siddala Kona Near Gudur

- Location within Andhra Pradesh Location within India

Religion
- Affiliation: Jainism
- Festival: Mahavir Jayanti

Location
- Location: Nellore district, Andhra Pradesh
- Interactive map of Siddalakona
- Coordinates: 14°12′14″N 79°43′36″E

SiddalaKona is located in Sydapuram mandal, Nellore district of the Indian state of Andhra Pradesh. It is located near It is a Jain Heritage site, cave and temple, built on a rock.

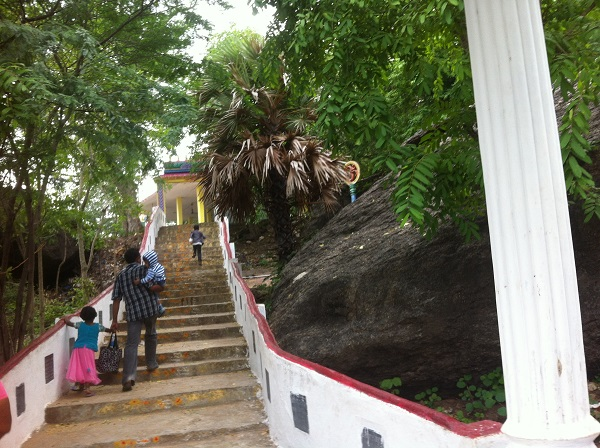
Siddala Kona Rock Cave at Siddala Kona Near Gudur
