= Bal Patil =

Indian writer (1932–2011)

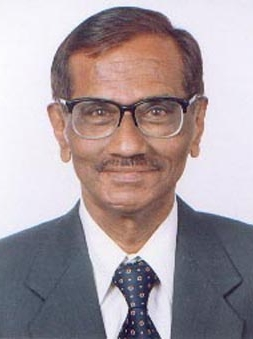
- Bal Patil
- Born: 19 November 1932; Sangli, Maharashtra
- Died: 7 October 2011 (aged 78); Mumbai
- Occupations: Writer, linguist and scholar; journalist, Social activist

Bal Patil (Marathi: बाळ पाटील; 1932–2011) was a Jain scholar, journalist, social activist and Jain minority status advocate from Mumbai, Maharashtra. He was appointed as a member of State Minority Commission by the Govt. of Maharashtra from 2001 to 2004. He was the Secretary-General of All India Jain Minority Forum, New Delhi—a position he held until his death—and was an ardent advocate of minority status for Jainism. The Jain minority cause gained prominence when he petitioned the Supreme Court of India for the recognition of Jain religious minority status on par with other Indian minorities as per the two recommendations by the National Minorities Commission. He was also the first non-medical President of the National Society for the Prevention of Heart Disease & Rehabilitation, Mumbai. He has also authored many books on Jainism and presented several papers at various seminars and conferences.

== The Bal Patil Judgement case ==
The Jain minority cause gained prominence when Bal Patil petitioned the Supreme Court of India to direct the Government of India to declare the Jains as national minorities in accordance with the recommendations of the National minorities commission. However, in 2005, the Supreme Court declined to issue a writ of Mandamus towards granting Jains the status of a religious minority throughout India. The Court however left it to the respective states to decide on the minority status of Jain religion.

In one of the observations of the Supreme Court, not forming part of the judgment, the Court said:

Thus, 'Hinduism' can be called a general religion and common faith of India whereas 'Jainism' is a special religion formed on the basis of quintessence of Hindu religion. Jainism places greater emphasis on non-violence ('Ahimsa') and compassion ('Karuna'). Their only difference from Hindus is that Jains do not believe in any creator like God but worship only the perfect human-being whom they called Tirthankar. Lord Mahavir was one in the generation of Tirthankars. The Tirthankars are embodiments of perfect human-beings who have achieved human excellence at mental and physical levels. In philosophical sense, Jainism is a reformist movement amongst Hindus like Brahamsamajis, Aryasamajis and Lingayats. The three main principles of Jainism are Ahimsa, Anekantavada and Aparigraha.

The Supreme Court also noted: " … that the State Governments of Chhattisgarh, Maharashtra, Madhya Pradesh, Uttar Pradesh and Uttarakhand have already notified Jains as 'minority' in accordance with the provisions of the respective State Minority Commissions Act."

This cast a doubt on the independent standing of Jain religion. Scholars in the Jain tradition, as well as several groups amongst the Jain community protested, and emphasised that Jain religion stands as a religion in its own right. While Hinduism, Jainism, Buddhism and Sikhism have a similar mode of living, and common cultural background and social customs, traditions and practices, but all four of them are different, distinct religions. Further, it is extremely disrespectful to Jainism, Buddhism and Sikhism to club them under the Brahminical religion, also known as Hinduism. While all four religions are Indian in origin, each one of them has its own entity, identity and distinctness. Hence, it is unfair to disregard their sovereignty and uniqueness and sweep their existence under the carpet. This judgement was also criticised by many noted politicians and jurists. Dr. L. M. Singhvi, Indian Jusrist noted that the judgment of three judges goes against the judgment of 11 judges and many previous judgments of larger benches on the basis of which Jains must be recognised as a distinct religious minority, distinct and reparate from the Hindus.

Mr. Patil was also critical of the Supreme Court judgment and issued a press note noting that:

The press and media reports on the recent Supreme Court Judgment of the Three-Judge Bench of the Chief Justice, R.C. Lahoti, Justice D.M. Dharmadhikari and Justice P.K. Balasubramanyam are misleading…[..]

These observations although made extra-Judicially have grave implications because the general public takes any declaration made by the Supreme Court as the law of the land. And as can be seen from the press reports and news Channels giving the wrong impression that the Supreme Court rejected the Jain demand for backward community status how damaging such extra-Judicial remarks can be. It is in this perspective that the Judgment of the Supreme Court in the matter of Bal Patil & Anr. Vs. Union of India has given the wrong message to the country against the Jain Community, the National leaders of the country whom we call "Founding Fathers" and the statutory functionaries Viz the National and State Commissions for Minorities who are said to be the cause of fissiparous tendencies.

[..].. extra-Judicial observations on the religious status of the Jain community as part of the Hindu religious are absolutely without any basis. Also the remarks against the National leaders like Nehru, Patel and the very Father of the Nation as responsible for the partition of India are obnoxious.

== Other causes ==
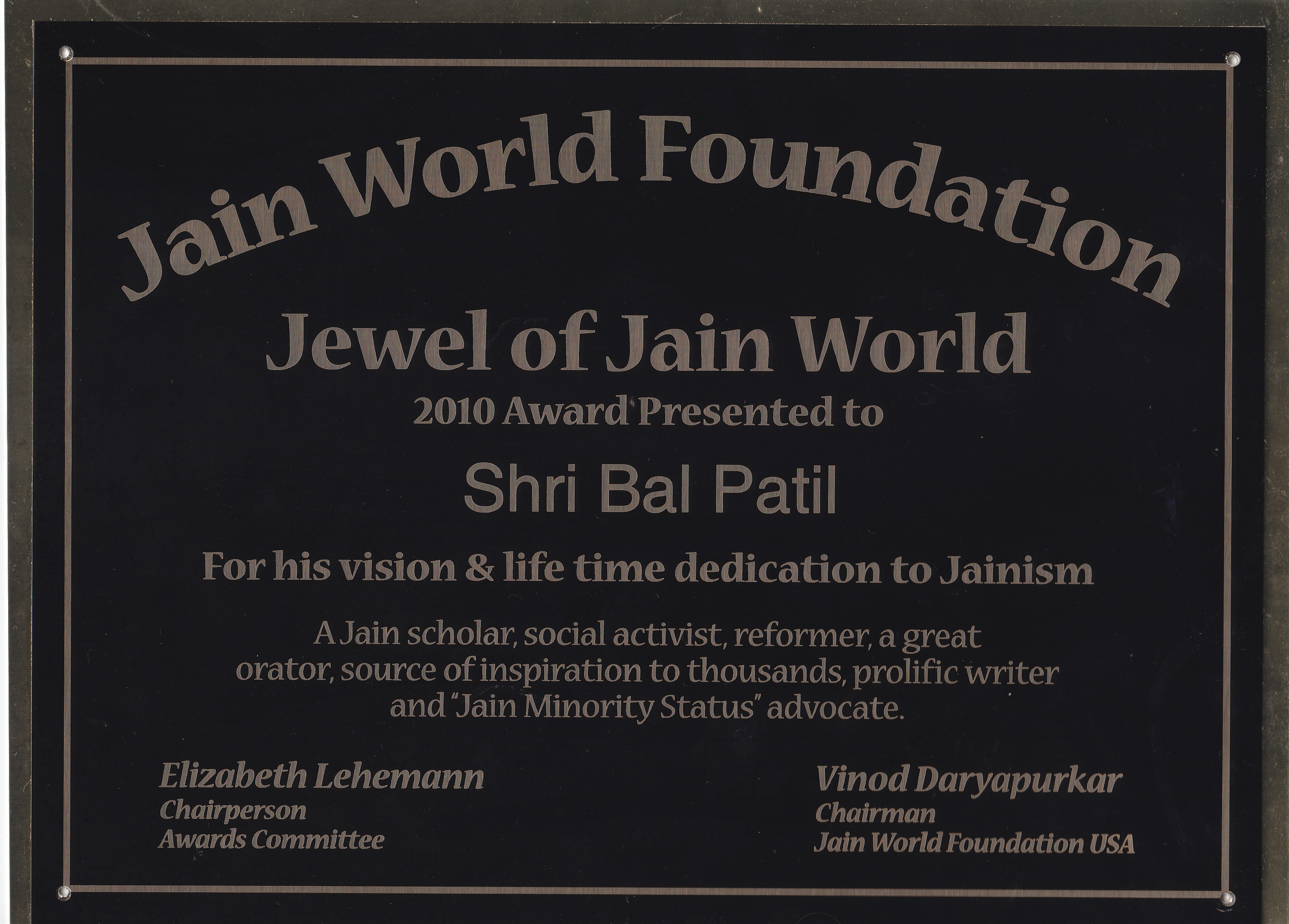
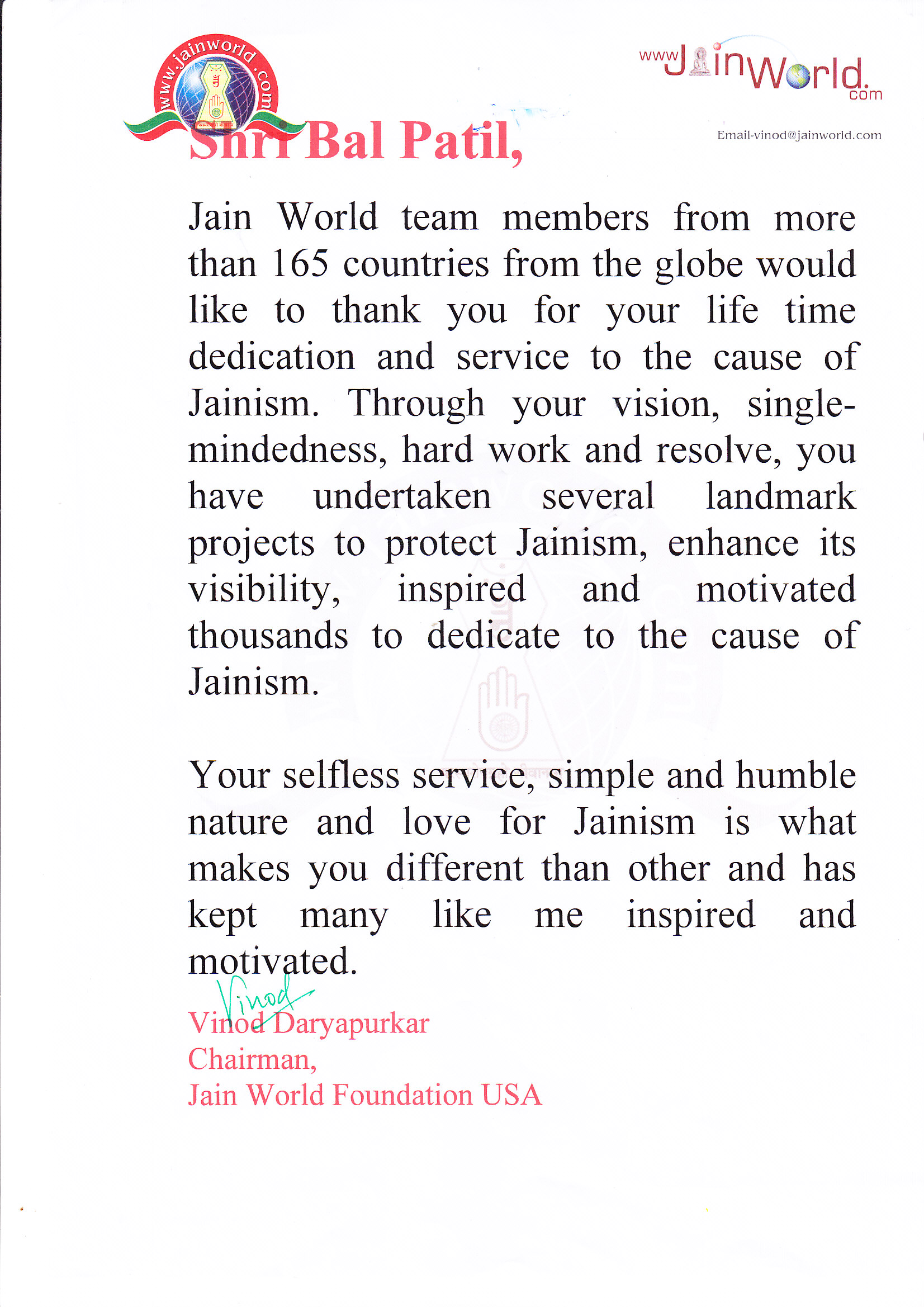
Award and Citation to Shri Bal Patil for his dedication to the cause of Jainism

Mr. Bal Patil took an objection to an inaccurate and misrepresentative observation made by Soli Sorabjee (former Attorney General of India) in an article in Times of India as it hurt the sentiments of Jain community. The case went to press council of India and Mr. Sorabjee tendered an apology. Mr. Patil was also highly critical of controversial Freedom of Religion Bill passes by Gujarat assembly which sought to club Jains and Buddhists under Hindus. Mr. Patil noted that "The amended Freedom of Religion Bill passed by the Gujarat assembly classifying Jains and Buddhists as Hindus is an unwarranted assault on the distinct religious identity recognised by the Constitution itself." Ultimately on 31 July 2007, finding it not in conformity with the concept of freedom of religion as embodied in Article 25 (1) of the Constitution, Governor Nawal Kishore Sharma returned the Gujarat Freedom of Religion (Amendment) Bill, 2006. The Governor held that Jainism and Buddhism are recognised as religions rather than denominations of Hinduism, something that the Amendment Bill sought to wrongly convey. A press release issued by Raj Bhawan, said "the proposed amendment would amount to withdrawing the protection against forceful or inappropriate religious conversions, particularly in case of Jains and Buddhists".

Owing to the unceasing efforts of Mr Patil and some others, Jains have now been declared as religious minority in many states of India. However, the Jain community still awaits recognition as a National Minority.

== Awards ==
In 2010, Bal Patil was awarded the "Jewel of Jain World" award presented by the Jain World Foundation. The award was presented to Mr. Patil for his vision and lifetime dedication to Jainism.

== Works ==
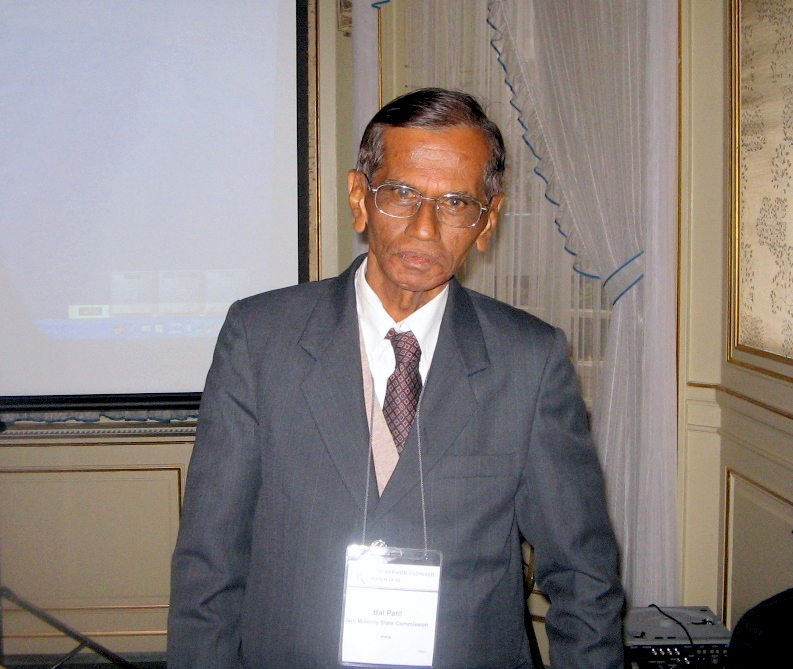
Bal Patil at Tokyo Conference to present his paper on evolution of Shramanic religion on 29 March 2005

- Caillat, Colette, A. N Upādhye, and Bal Patil (1974) Jainism. Delhi: Macmillan Co. of India. OCLC: 2654850
- Patil, Bal (1980) Supreme Court's Volte Face on Constitutional Amendments Mumbai: Government of Maharashtra
- Patil, Bal (2006). Jaya Gommatesa. Mumbai: Hindi Granth Karyalay. ISBN 978-81-88769-10-0.
- Alsdorf, Ludwig, Willem Bollée, and Bal Patil (2006) Jaina Studies: Their Present State and Future Tasks. Pandit Nathuram Premi Research Series, 1. Mumbai: Hindi Granth Karyalay. ISBN 978-81-88769-13-1. OCLC: 255450182
- Patil, Bal (2008) Jainism: An Eternal Pilgrimage. Ed. Manish Modi & Tony Whittington. Pandit Nathuram Premi Research Series, 23. Mumbai: Hindi Granth Karyalay. ISBN 978-81-88769-34-6. OCLC: 276487115
- Alsdorf, Ludwig, Bal Patil, Nichola Hayton, and Willem B. Bollée. (2010) The History of Vegetarianism and Cow-Veneration in Ancient India London: Routledge. ISBN 978-0-203-85959-9. OCLC: 430678942
- Patil, Bal (2011) Jainism: An Eternal Pilgrimage. Ed. Manish Modi. Pandit Nathuram Premi Research Series, 23. Mumbai: Hindi Granth Karyalay. ISBN 978-81-88769-54-4.
