= Aryanandi =

Aryanandi may refer to:

- Aryanandi (8th century), a historic Jain monk
- Aryanandi (born 1907), a modern Jain monk
