= Aryanandi (8th century) =

Digambar Jain monk

Acharya Aryanandi

Personal life
- Era: 8th century CE
- Notable work: No surviving texts

Religious life
- Religion: Jainism
- Sect: Digambar

Religious career
- Teacher: Acharya Chandrasena
- Successor: Acharya Virasena
- Disciple of: Acharya Chandrasena
- Disciples: Virasena and Jayasena

Acharya Aryanandi (fl. 8th century CE) was a Digambar Jain monk and teacher, best known as the spiritual preceptor of Acharya Virasena, the influential commentator on Jain canonical literature. Aryanandi is remembered primarily through the "pattavali" (monastic lineage records), where he is credited with transmitting key teachings of the Digambara tradition to the next generation of scholars.

== Life ==
Aryanandi lived during the early to mid-8th century CE, a formative period in the evolution of Digambara scholarship in South India. Though few biographical details survive, his presence is recorded in Jain monastic genealogies as an important link between earlier acharyas and the flowering of scholastic activity during the Rashtrakuta period.

== Influence and Disciples ==
Aryanandi's most important disciple was: Acharya Virasena – the principal author of portions of the Dhavala commentary on the Shatkhandagama, a foundational Digambara scripture.

Through Virasena, Aryanandi indirectly influenced:

- Jinasena I – author of the Adi Purana and co-author of the Mahapurana
- Gunasena (Jinasena II)* – commentator on the Dhavala
- Gunabhadra – co-author of the Uttarapurana

== Works ==
No known texts are directly attributed to Aryanandi, which suggests that his teachings may have been transmitted orally. Nevertheless, his role as a teacher and transmitter of scriptural knowledge was critical to the continuation of the Jain doctrinal lineage.

== Legacy ==
Aryanandi holds a respected place within Digambara tradition as a silent pillar behind the resurgence of Jain philosophy in South India. His mentorship of Virasena ultimately contributed to some of the most significant Jain literary achievements of the 9th and 10th centuries CE.

== See also ==
- Dhavala
- Adi Purana
- Mahapurana
