= Padmanabh Jaini =

Indian-American scholar of Jainism and Buddhism (1923–2021)

- Born: Nellikar, Karnataka

Padmanabh Shrivarma Jaini (October 23, 1923 – May 25, 2021) was an Indian-American scholar of Jainism and Buddhism, living in Berkeley, California, United States. He was from a Digambar Jain family; however he was equally familiar with both the Digambara and Śvetāmbara forms of Jainism. He has taught at the Banaras Hindu University, the School of Oriental and African Studies (SOAS), the University of Michigan at Ann Arbor and at the University of California at Berkeley, from which he retired in 1994. Jaini was the author of several books and papers. His best known work is The Jaina Path of Purification (1979). Some of his major articles have been published under these titles: The Collected Papers on Jaina Studies (2000) and Collected Papers on Buddhist Studies (2001). He died on 25 May 2021 at Berkeley at age 97.

== Early life and education ==
Jaini was born to a Digambar Jain family residing in Nellikar, a small town near Moodabidri, Karnataka, India on October 23, 1923. His father had abandoned his title of Shetty and adopted the name of Jaini—after the famous Jain scholar, Jugmandar Lal Jaini (1881–1927)—responding to calls within the community to change their names to foster a greater sense of Jain identity. After completing his elementary education, he was sent to Digambara Jain Gurukul, a boarding school in Karanja in Vidharbha, Maharashtra. It was run on traditional Jain principles and here he came in contact with Jain scholars of his time like – Pandit Nathuram Premi, Hiralal Jain, A.N. Upadhye.

After completing his secondary education here, he went to Arts College at Nashik where he took the degree of BA hons in 1947 in Sanskrit and Prakrit. During this time he supported himself by taking a job as a superintendent of a Jain Śvetāmbara Hostel and thus coming in contact with the Śvetāmbara community for the first time.

== Path to scholarship ==
After graduation, he was invited to study with Pandit Sukhlal Sanghavi, a renowned scholar belonging to the Sthanakvasi Jain tradition. His daily meeting with Sanghavi, involved not only a formal and rigorous instruction in Jain logic, but he was also exposed to Sanghavi's views on various sectarian debates and controversies. With Sukhlalji's encouragement he studied Pāli Canon and decided to continue his postgraduate studies in Sri Lanka, thus acquiring a thorough knowledge of Pali Canon and Buddhist scriptures. Here he became a Dharmananda Kosambi memorial Scholar and met B. R. Ambedkar (before his conversion to Buddhism) and was awarded Tripatakacarya degree in 1951 at the residence of the Prime Minister Senanayake. His years in Sri Lanka were the basis for his first publication in Gujarati, "Ceylonman Be Varsa" (Two years in Ceylon). It contains much information on the Theravada Buddhism philosophy and practices.

On returning he took up position as a lecturer in Ahmedabad and in 1952 he took up position as a lecturer in Pali in Benaras university. Subsequently he took up position as a lecturer in Pali and Sanskrit with SOAS, London from 1956 to 1957. There under John Borough's supervision he completed his Ph.D. in Buddhist work, Abhidharmadipa. From there he travelled to Burma, Indonesia, Cambodia and Thailand to collect various Buddhist manuscripts which he later edited and translated for Pali Text Society. Subsequently he moved to University of Michigan as professor of Indic Languages and Literature up to 1972. Thereafter from 1972 to 1994 he served as a professor of Buddhist studies in Department of South and Southeast Asian studies, University of Berkeley, California. After his retirement, he has continued as professor emeritus of the University. The University has constituted "Padmanabh S. Jaini Graduate Student Award in Buddhist Studies" that supports high-achieving graduate students in Buddhist Studies at UC Berkeley and honors Jaini's important legacy in the field of Buddhist studies.

== Works and publications ==
A partial list of his published works:

- Jaini, Padmanabh (1998). The Jaina Path of Purification. New Delhi: Motilal Banarsidass. ISBN 81-208-1578-5. (First edition in 1979)
- Jaini, Padmanabh (1991). Gender and Salvation: Jaina Debates on the Spiritual Liberation of Women. Berkeley: University of California Press.
- Jaini, Padmanabh (2000). Collected Papers on Jaina Studies. Delhi: Motilal Banarsidass Publ. ISBN 81-208-1691-9.
- Jaini, Padmanabh (2001). Collected Papers on Buddhist Studies. New Delhi: Motilal Banarsidass Publ. ISBN 81-208-1776-1.
- Padmanabh Jaini & Mark Tully (2009). Christianity and Jainism : An Interfaith Dialogue. Mumbai: Hindi Granth Karyalay. ISBN 978-81-88769-42-1.

A partial list of works published by Pali text Society include:

- Subodhalankara: Porana-tika (Mahasami-tika)
- Apocryphal Birth-Stories (Pannasa-Jataka)
- Lokaneyyapakarana

His other works include "Abhidharma Buddhism to 150 A.D." published under Encyclopedia of Indian Philosophies series. His autobiography "Yogayoga: Memoirs of Professor Dr. Padmanabh S. Jaini" is translated by Amit Joharapurkar in Marathi. His life and work was narrated in the biographical book ":Charitra Tyanche Paha Jara (चरित्र त्यांचे पहा जरा)" in Marathi.
