= Shruta Panchami =

- Observed by: Jains
- Type: Jainism
- Frequency: Annual

Shruta Panchami (Sanskrit: श्रुत पंचमी) is a religious festival observed primarily by the Digambara sect of Jainism. It falls on the fifth day (Panchami) of the bright half (Shukla Paksha) of the lunar month of Jyeshtha (usually May or June).

The festival commemorates the historic completion of the Shatkhandagama, the first written scripture of the Digambara tradition, by Acharyas Pushpadanta and Bhutabali. Historically, this day marks the transition of the Digambara lineage from a purely oral tradition (mukhapatha) to a written literary tradition, an event credited with preserving the canonical knowledge from extinction.

== Etymology ==
The term is a compound of two Sanskrit words:

- Shruta (श्रुत): Literally meaning "that which is heard." In Jain context, it refers to the canon or scripture, traditionally passed down orally through the lineage of teachers.
- Panchami (पंचमी): The fifth day of the lunar fortnight.

It is also occasionally referred to as Shruta-Jnan Panchami (The Fifth of Scriptural Knowledge).

== History ==
According to Digambara historical traditions, the original spiritual teachings of Mahavira, 24th tirthankara were initially preserved exclusively through oral memorization. These teachings were structurally organized into a canonical body known as the twelve Angas and fourteen Purvas. Following the liberation of Mahavira, this oral tradition remained intact for several centuries through a continuous lineage of monastic teachers. However, the structural integrity of this memorized canon began to degrade due to the naturally declining memory capacities of later generations of monks. This decline was severely accelerated by a devastating twelve-year famine in northern India, which led to the death of many senior ascetics who held the oral canon in their memories.

By the second century CE, the Digambara sect believed that almost the entire original canon had been completely lost. According to community records, a senior monk named Acharya Dharasena possessed the last remaining fragments of the Angas and Purvas. Residing in a cave at Mount Girnar in Gujarat, Dharasena recognized the imminent extinction of the scriptural knowledge and decided to transition the surviving teachings into a written format. He summoned two qualified monks, Pushpadanta and Bhutabali, and verbally transmitted the remaining canonical fragments to them.

Using the knowledge received from Dharasena, Pushpadanta and Bhutabali composed a comprehensive written text known as the Shatkhandagama, or the Scripture in Six Parts. This composition marked a fundamental shift in the Digambara tradition from a purely oral lineage to a structured literary tradition. The two monks officially completed the manuscript on the fifth day of the bright half of the lunar month of Jyeshtha. To celebrate the preservation of the surviving scriptures, the local religious community organized a formal veneration of the newly written texts. This historic day of completion and textual veneration became institutionalized as the annual festival of Shruta Panchami.

== Observances and Rituals ==
Shruta Panchami is actively observed by the Digambara community through the physical veneration and systematic preservation of sacred texts. The primary ritual of the festival is Shastra Puja, which translates to the worship of scriptures. During this ceremony, holy books and ancient manuscripts are placed on elevated wooden platforms within the temple assembly halls. Devotees offer yellow rice, fresh flowers, and sandalwood paste directly to the manuscripts to express reverence for the preserved canonical knowledge.

Beyond ritual worship, the festival serves a practical historical function regarding manuscript conservation. Temple libraries, traditionally known as Saraswati Bhavans, are formally opened and inspected by the local community. Monks and laypeople work collaboratively to dust, clean, and sun-dry ancient palm-leaf and paper manuscripts. This communal cleaning process is timed strategically to protect the fragile texts from insects and the destructive humidity brought by the approaching monsoon season. In many temple repositories, the texts are carefully re-bound and wrapped in fresh protective cloth covers for the coming year.

In major Jain demographic centers, the celebration expands into the public sphere through a chariot procession known as a Rath Yatra. During this procession, copies of the Shatkhandagama and other primary scriptures are placed inside highly decorated palanquins and paraded through the city streets. The observance typically concludes with special religious discourses delivered by senior ascetics. These sermons focus on the theological importance of Shruta Jnana, or scriptural knowledge, as a necessary framework for spiritual liberation. Lay members of the community frequently observe dietary fasts on this day to demonstrate their commitment to spiritual learning and bodily self-discipline.

== See also ==
- Mahavira Janma Kalyanaka
