= Satyabhakta =

Satyabhakta (Hindi सत्यभक्त) may refer to

- Swami Satyabhakta, formerly Darbarilal Jain, philosopher and founder of Satya Samaj
- Satya Bhakta (1897-1985), a founder of Communist movement in India
