= Satkhandagama =

Digambara Jain sacred text

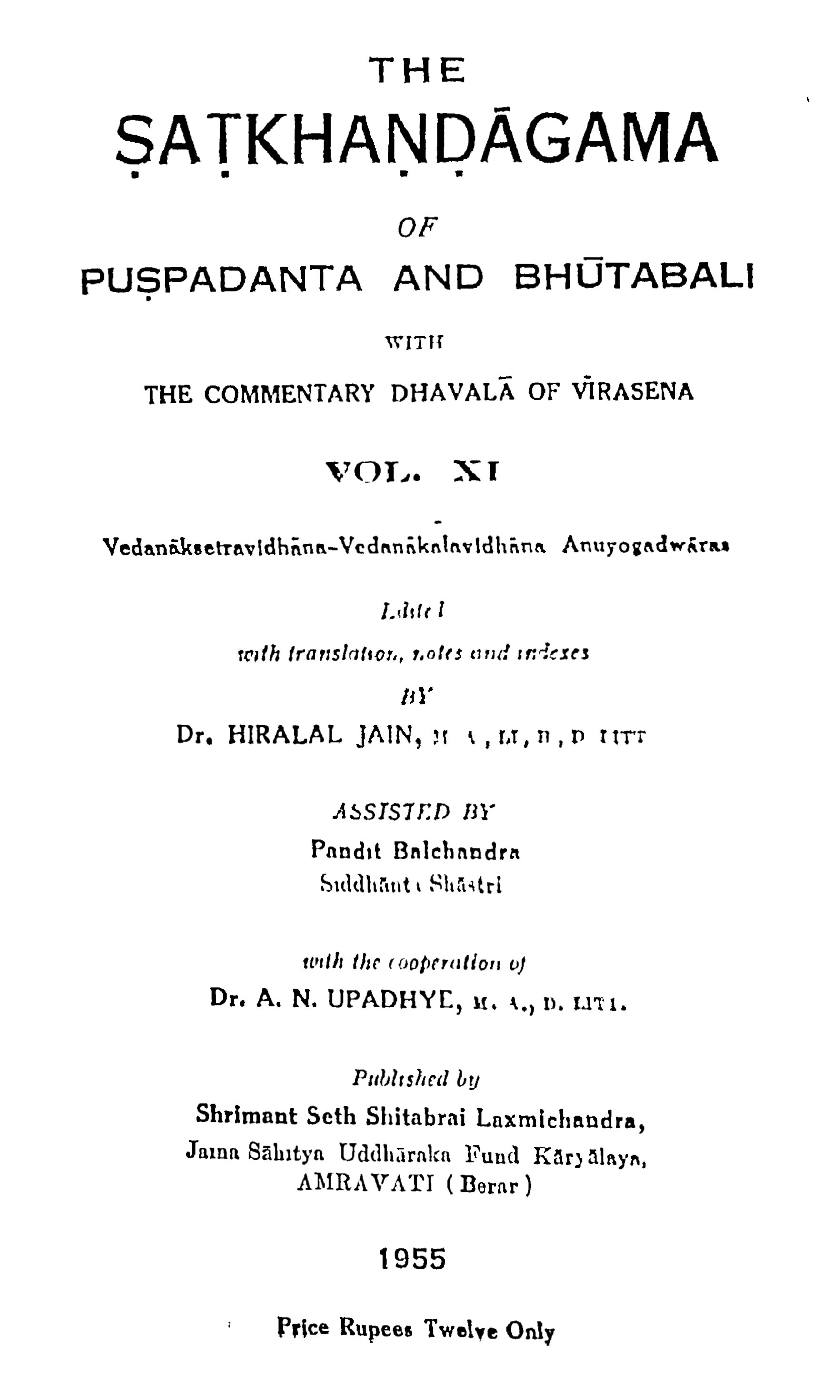
- Ṣaṭkhaṅḍāgama with commentary Dhavalā of Acharya Virasena

Information
- Religion: Jainism
- Author: Puṣpadanta and Bhūtabali
- Language: Prakrit
- Chapters: 5

The Ṣaṭkhaṇḍāgama (Prakrit: "Scripture in Six Parts") is the only canonical piece of literature of Digambara sect of Jainism. According to Digambara tradition, the original teachings of Lord Mahavira were passed on orally from Ganadhar, the chief disciple of Mahavira to his disciples and so on as they had the capability of listening and remembering it for always. But as the centuries passed there was downfall in these capabilities and so Ācārya Puṣpadanta and Bhūtabali penned down the teachings of Mahavira in Ṣaṭkhaṇḍāgama. Therefore the Ṣaṭkhaṇḍāgama is the most revered Digambara text that has been given the status of āgama.

The importance of the Ṣaṭkhaṇḍāgama to the Digambaras can be judged by the fact that, the day its Dhavalā commentary was completed, it is commemorated on the Śrūta Pañcamī, a day when all the Jain scriptures are venerated. The Ṣaṭkhaṇḍāgama, the first āgama, is also called the "Prathama Śruta-Skandha", while the Pañca Paramāgama by Kundakunda are referred to as the second āgama or Dvitiya Śruta-Skandha.

== Origins ==
This work is based oral tradition of Dharasena, a Digambara monk, who knew parts of several canons. According to the tradition, alarmed at the gradual dwindling of scriptural knowledge, he summoned two monks, Puṣpadanta and Bhūtabali to a cave, known as Candra Guphā, or the Moon Cave, his retreat in mount Girnar, Gujarat, and communicated what he remembered out of originally vast extent of sacred Jain writings. He taught them portions of the fifth Aṅga Viāhapannaṭṭi (Vyākhyā Prajñapti) and of the twelfth Aṅga Diṭṭhivāda (Dṛṣṭivāda). These were subsequently reduced to writing in Sutra form by his pupils. Puṣpadanta composed the first 177 aphorisms and his colleague Bhūtabali wrote the rest, the total being 6000 aphorisms.

These texts were composed around 1st century CE.

== Dhavala Commentary ==
Ācārya Vīrasena received the ancient Ṣaṭkhaṇḍāgama and Kasāyapāhuḍa texts through the lineage tradition. At Vatagram, he wrote a 72,000 śloka commentary on Ṣaṭkhaṇḍāgama (known as Dhavala and the last section called Mahadhavala) and 20,000 shloka commentary the Kashyaprabhrita (known as Jayadhavala). After his death, his disciple Jinasena completed the Jayadhavala commentary by adding another 20,000 shlokas. Both of the commentaries use both Sanskrit and Prakit. Jayadhavala was finished during the rule of the Rashtrakuta ruler Amoghavarsha in 838 AD (or Jagatunga according to some scholars).

A palm leaf manuscript of this long work were preserved in the Digambara holy place of Shravanabelagola at the Siddhanta Basadi. Later they were shifted to Mudabidri, a temple town in South-West Karnataka. The palm leaf manuscript, itself written during the Rāṣṭrakūṭa rule, is still preserved. Some of the leaves contain beautiful paintings of historical importance A copy was reputed to have been at the Malked (Manyakhet) Mutt, but that has not survived. At Mudabidri, these manuscripts were treated with great reverence, but became mere objects of worship, and unavailable to outside scholars. Ordinary householders were not permitted to study them. Digambara āgamas like Ṣaṭkhaṇḍāgama and the Kasāyapāhuda were in a state of neglect and were not studied or made available to the community.

== Revival to the Modern Society ==
With the support of Manikchand of Sholapur during 1896 to 1920, the Moodbidrai manuscript were transcribed in modern Nagari and Kannad scripts, without the knowledge of the Moodbidri temple trustees.

In the 20th century, Dr. Hiralal Jain was one of the first few lay scholars who decided to retrieve the āgamas, and bring to light with systematic editing and proof reading. With the help of his scholar friends like Pandit Nathuram Premi and Jamunaprasada Sub-Judge, he raised the funds to publish the āgamas, and set out to extricate the āgamas from Mudabidri, where the original handwritten Prakrit manuscripts had lain for centuries, unstudied. Dr Hiralal Jain, Pt Nathuram Premi and Jamunaprasada sub-judge together managed to convince Seth Sitabray Gulabray, a wealthy land-owner from Vidisha (Bundelkhand, Madhya Pradesh) belonging to the Paravāra community, to donate Rs. 30,000 for the cause of editing and publishing the Satkhandāgama along with its Dhavalā commentary, expertly edited and accompanied by an excellent Hindi translation. This donation enabled Dr Hiralal Jain to work together with Dr. A.N. Upadhye, close friend and a scholar of Prakrit. Dr. Hiralal Jain brought together a team of scholars including, Pt. Phulchandra Shastri, Pt. Kailashchandra Shastri, Sh. Sheryansh Kumar Jain Shastri, Pt. Hiralal Shastri and Pt. Balachandra Shastri started the project of revival and study of the Digambara āgama. These scholars had to face stiff opposition from the monks and the traditional srāvakas who were opposed to the very concept of printing religious scriptures as they felt that printing would undermine the purity of the scripture.

In a period of twenty years, the Satkhandāgama, along with its massive Dhavalā and Mahādhavalā commentaries was edited from the original palm leaf manuscripts and published after very careful proof reading in consultation with senior Jaina scholars like Pt. Nathuram Premi and Pt. Devakinandan Nayak.

== Subject matter of the Agama and its commentaries ==
The Ṣaṭkhaṇḍāgama, as the name suggests, is a scripture in six parts. The six parts are:

1. Jīva Sthāna (Categories of Living Beings)
2. Kṣudraka Bāndha (Minutiae of Bondage)
3. Bāndhasvāmitva (Ownership of Bondage)
4. Vedanā (Perception)
5. Varganā (Divisions of Karmas)
6. Mahābāndha (Great Bondage)

Ṣaṭkhaṇḍāgama postulates karma theory, using a number of technical terms defining various concepts and mathematical notions. The first three parts deal with the karma philosophy from the view point of the soul which is the agent of the bondage and the last three section discusses the nature and extent of the karmas.

The commentary on the first five parts is known as the Dhaval्ā. The commentary on the sixth part is known as the Mahādhavalā.

Dhavalā is divided into 16 sections which is as follows:

- Volume One, Jivasthana - Categories of Living Beings

- Book 1: Satprārūpaṇa (Teaching on the Entities) Part - 1
- Book 2: Satprārūpaṇa (Teaching on the Entities) Part - 2
- Book 3: Dravyapramāṇāṇugama (Teaching on the Entities)
- Book 4: Kṣetra - Sparśana - Kalānugama (Location, Touch and Time)
- Book 5: Antara - Bhāva - Alpabahuttva (Gap, State, Few or Many)
- Book 6: Culika (Appendix)

- Volume Two : Kṣudraka Bāndha - Minutiae of Bondage
- Volume Three : Bāndhasvamittva - Ownership of Bondage
- Volume Four, Vedanā - Perception

- Book 1: Krtianuyogdvara (Acts as Doors of Disquisition)
- Book 2: Vedanā Kṣetra - Vedanā Kāla - Vedanā Dravya (Area, Time and Object of Perception)
- Book 3: Vedanā Kṣetra - Vedanā Kāla (Area and Time of Perception)
- Book 4: Vedanā Bhava Vidhāna (Directive on State of Perception)

- Volume Five Vargana - Divisions of Karma

- Book 1: Sparśakarmaprakṛti Anuyoga (Examination of the Nature of Karmic Sensation)
- Book 2: Bandhana Anuyoga (Examination of Bondage)
- Book 3: Nibandhanādi Catura Anuyoga (Four-part Examination of the Fastening of Karmas)
- Book 4: Mokṣādi Caturdaśa Anuyoga (Fourteen-part Examination of Liberation, etc.)

Mahādhavalā the commentary on sixth section called Mahabandha has seven books. The other Digambara āgama, the Kasāyapāhuda, also has a voluminous commentary. It is called the Jaya Dhavalā. All three commentaries were composed by Ācārya Virasena and Ācārya Jinasena (8th century CE). The text and its commentaries preserved on the palm leaf manuscripts run into some 120,000 verses.

One interesting fact about the Ṣaṭkhaṇḍāgama is that it is believed that the 5 pada Namokar Mantra is believed to have been composed by Ācārya Puṣpadanta as the mangalacarana (opening verse, often an invocation to god for the successful completion of the text) to the Satkhandāgama. Before this work, only the 2 pada Namokāra Mantra has been found in inscriptions. Hence, there is reason to believe that Ācārya Puṣpadanta was the first person to compose the 5 pada Namokāra Mantra. The Ṣaṭkhaṇḍāgama is a highly complex work, adumbrating the Jaina karma siddhānta. Although it is a Digambara work, it is seen as an authoritative work on the Jaina karma theory by all Jains.

== Hindi and English translations ==
The first five parts of the Ṣaṭkhaṇḍāgama along with the Dhavalā commentary and Hindi translation, running into 16 Volumes, was first published from Vidisha itself, by the family of Shrimant Seth Sitabray Gulabray. But is now published by the Jaina Sanskriti Sanrakshak Sangh in Solapur and distributed by Hindi Granth Karyalay, Mumbai. The Mahādhavalā commentary and Hindi translation, running into 7 Volumes, is published from New Delhi by Bharatiya Jñanapitha. The Kasāyapāhuda along with the JayaDhavalā commentary and Hindi translation, running into 16 Volumes, is published by Jaina Sangha, Mathura and distributed by Hindi Granth Karyalay, Mumbai.

Popular English Translations are :- Satkhandagama : Dhavala (Jivasthana) Satparupana-I (Enunciation of Existence-I) An English Translation of Part 1 of the Dhavala Commentary on the Ṣaṭkhaṇḍāgama of Acarya Puṣpadanta & Bhūtabali Dhavala commentary by Acarya Virasena English tr. by Prof. Nandlal Jain, Ed. by Prof. Ashok Jain, ISBN 8186957472, ISBN 9788186957479
