= 1967 Indian presidential election =

Election of Zakir Husain

- 6 May 1967
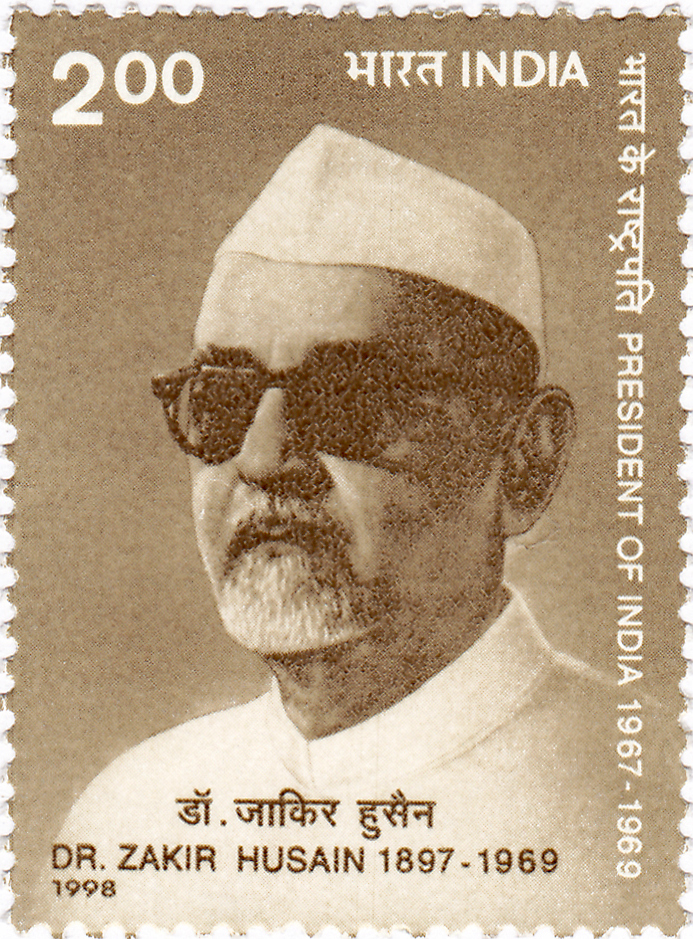

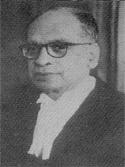
Nominee	Zakir Husain	Koka Subba Rao
Party	Independent	Independent
Home state	Telangana then Andhra Pradesh	Andhra Pradesh
Electoral vote	471,244	363,971
Percentage	56.22%	43.43%
President before election
Sarvepalli Radhakrishnan
Independent
Elected President
Zakir Husain
Independent

The Election Commission of India held the indirect fourth presidential elections of India on 6 May 1967. Dr. Zakir Husain, with 471,244 votes, won the presidency over his rival Koka Subba Rao, who garnered 363,971 votes.

== Schedule ==
The election schedule was announced by the Election Commission of India on 3 April 1967.

S.No.	Poll Event	Date
1.	Last Date for filing nomination	13 April 1967
2.	Date for Scrutiny of nomination	15 April 1967
3.	Last Date for Withdrawal of nomination	18 April 1967
4.	Date of Poll	6 May 1967
5.	Date of Counting	9 May 1967

== Results ==
Source: Web archive of Election Commission of India website

Candidate	Electoral Values
Zakir Husain	471,244
Koka Subba Rao	363,971
Khubi Ram	1,369
Yamuna Prasad Trisulia	232
Shriniwas Gopal Bhamburkar	232
Brahma Deo	232
Krishna Kumar Chatterjee	125
Kumar Kamla Singh	125
Chandradatt Senani	—
U. P. Chugani	—
M. C. Davar	—
Chaudhary Hari Ram	—
Dr. Man Singh Ahluwalia	_
Seetharamaiah Ramaswamy Sharma Hoysala	—
Swami Satyabhakta	—
Total	838,170

== See also ==
- 1967 Indian vice presidential election
