= Mahavira Janma Kalyanaka =

Day celebrating the birth of Mahavira, 24th and last Tirthankara of Jainism

Mahavir Janma Kalyanak
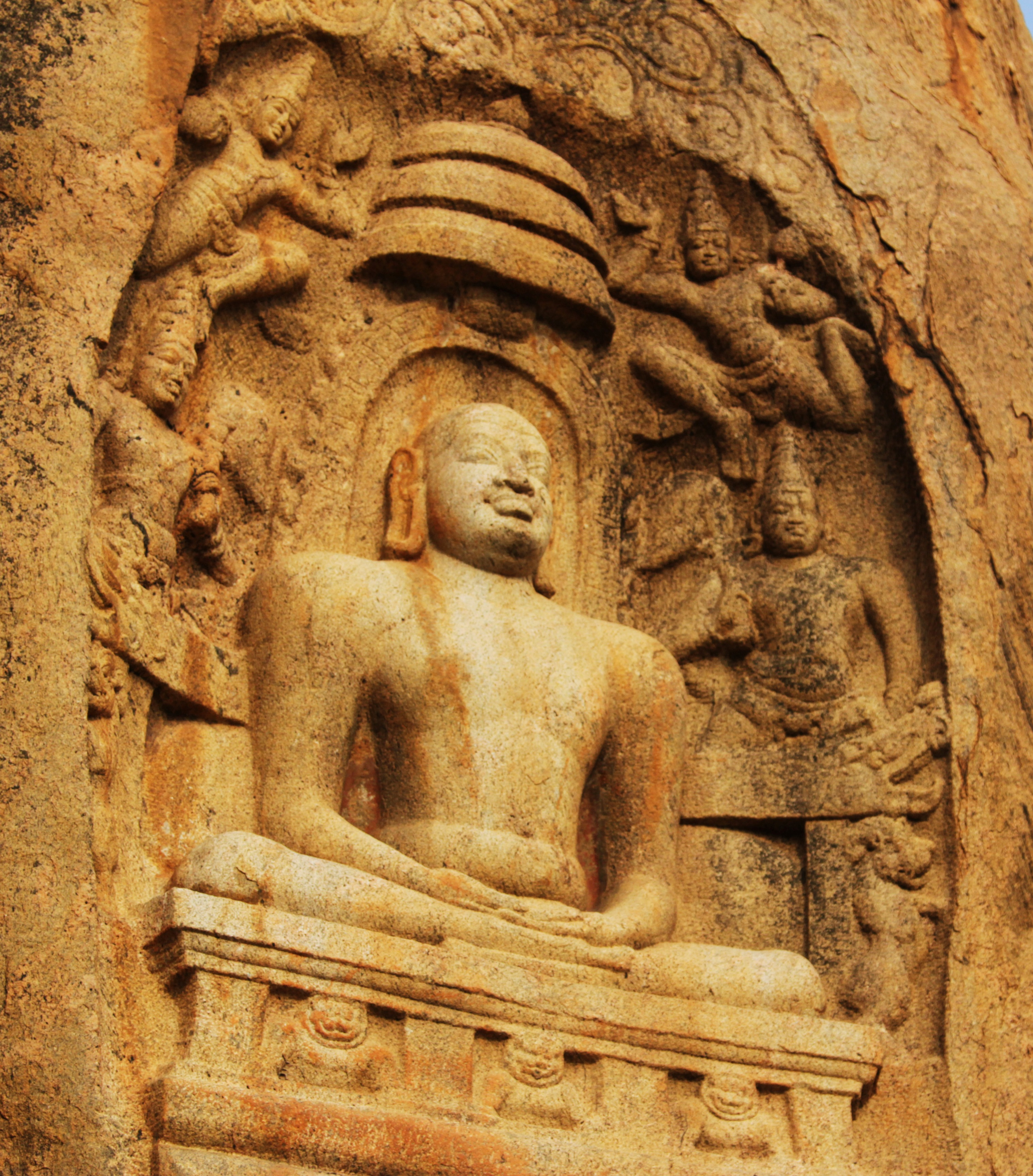
- Vardhaman Mahavira image at Keelakuyilkudi, Madurai, Tamil Nadu, India
- Official name: Mahavir Janma Kalyanak
- Observed by: Jains
- Type: Religious, India (national holiday)
- Significance: Birth Anniversary of Mahavira
- Celebrations: Going to the Jain Temple, offering prayers, holding processions with Mahaveer Prabhu’s idol and celebrate with songs and dance on religious tunes
- Observances: Prayers, religious rituals
- Date: Chaitra Shudda Triyodashi (teras) (Vira Nirvana Samvat)
- 2025 date: 10 April
- 2026 date: 31 March
- Frequency: Annual

Mahavira Janma Kalyanaka is one of the most important religious festivals in Jainism. It celebrates the birth of Mahavira, the twenty-fourth and last Tīrthaṅkara (supreme preacher) of present Avasarpiṇī. (Note: descending half of the worldly time cycle as per Jain cosmology which is actually current now) On the Gregorian calendar, the festivity occurs either in March or April.

== Birth ==
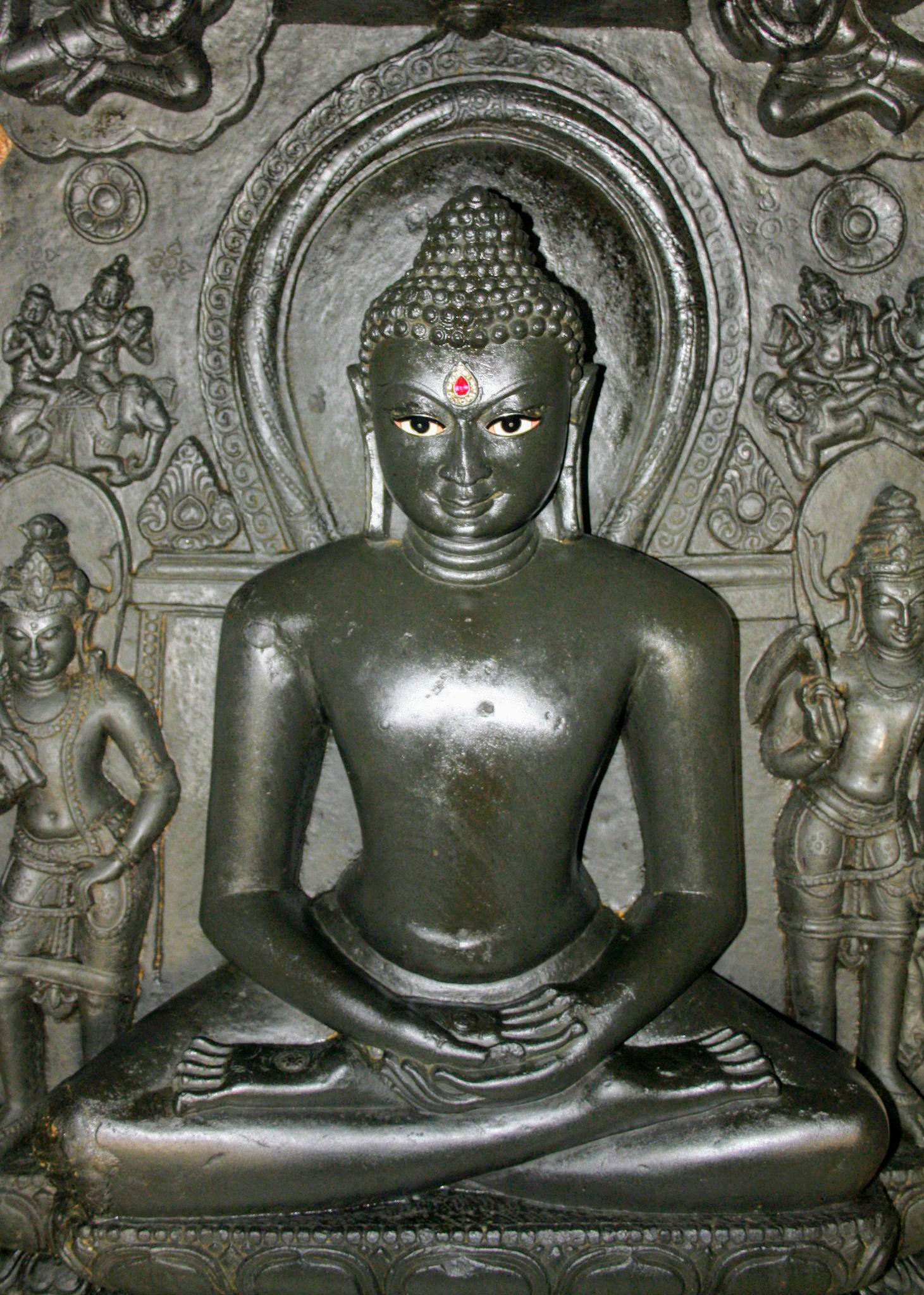
Murti of Mahavira at his birthplace, Kshatriyakund (Shvetambara tradition), in Bihar

According to Jain texts, Mahavira was born on the thirteenth day of the bright half of the moon in the month of Chaitra in the year 599 BC (Chaitra Sud 13). According to Shvetambara tradition, he was born in Kshatriyakund of Bihar. Some modern historians consider Kundagram (which is today's Kundalpur in Nalanda District of Bihar) as his birthplace. He was born in a democratic kingdom (Ganarajya), Vajji, where the king was chosen by votes. Vaishali was its capital. He was named Vardhamana, meaning "One who grows", because of the increased prosperity in the kingdom at the time of his birth. In Vasokund, Mahavira is revered by the villagers. A place called Ahalya bhumi has not been ploughed for hundreds of years by the family that owns it, as it is considered to be the birthplace of Mahavira.

=== Legend ===
Mahavira was born into Nāya clan as the son of King Siddhartha of Kundagrama and Queen Trishala. During her pregnancy, Trishala was believed to have 14 auspicious dreams, all signifying the coming of a great soul. Shwetamber Sect of Jainism believes that the mother saw 14 and Digambara sect believes mother saw sixteen dreams which were interpreted by the King Siddhartha. It is said that when Queen Trishala gave birth to Mahavira, Indra, the head of heavenly beings (devas) performed a ritual called abhisheka on Sumeru Parvat, this being the second of five auspicious events (Panch Kalyanakas), said to occur in the life of all Tirthankaras.

== Celebrations ==
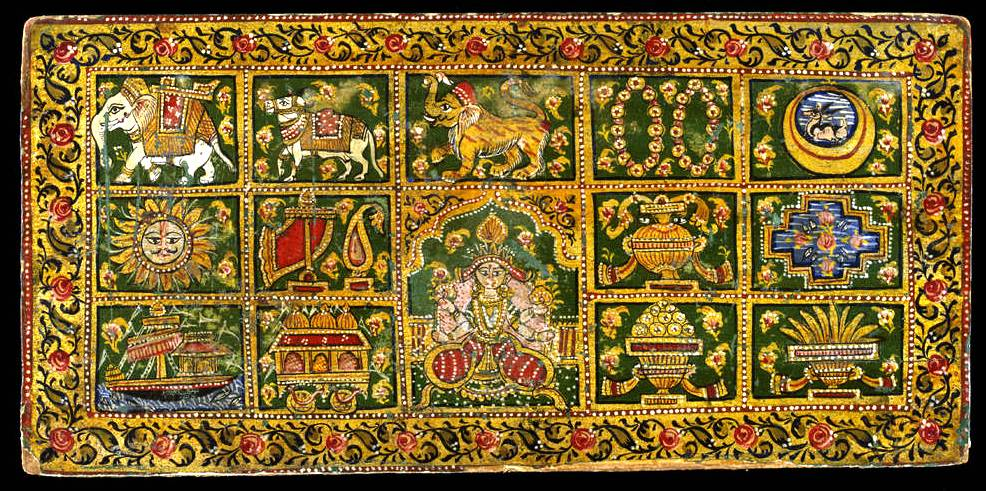
Auspicious 14 dreams seen by a tirthankara's mother during pregnancy as an ornamentation on cover of 19th-century manuscript

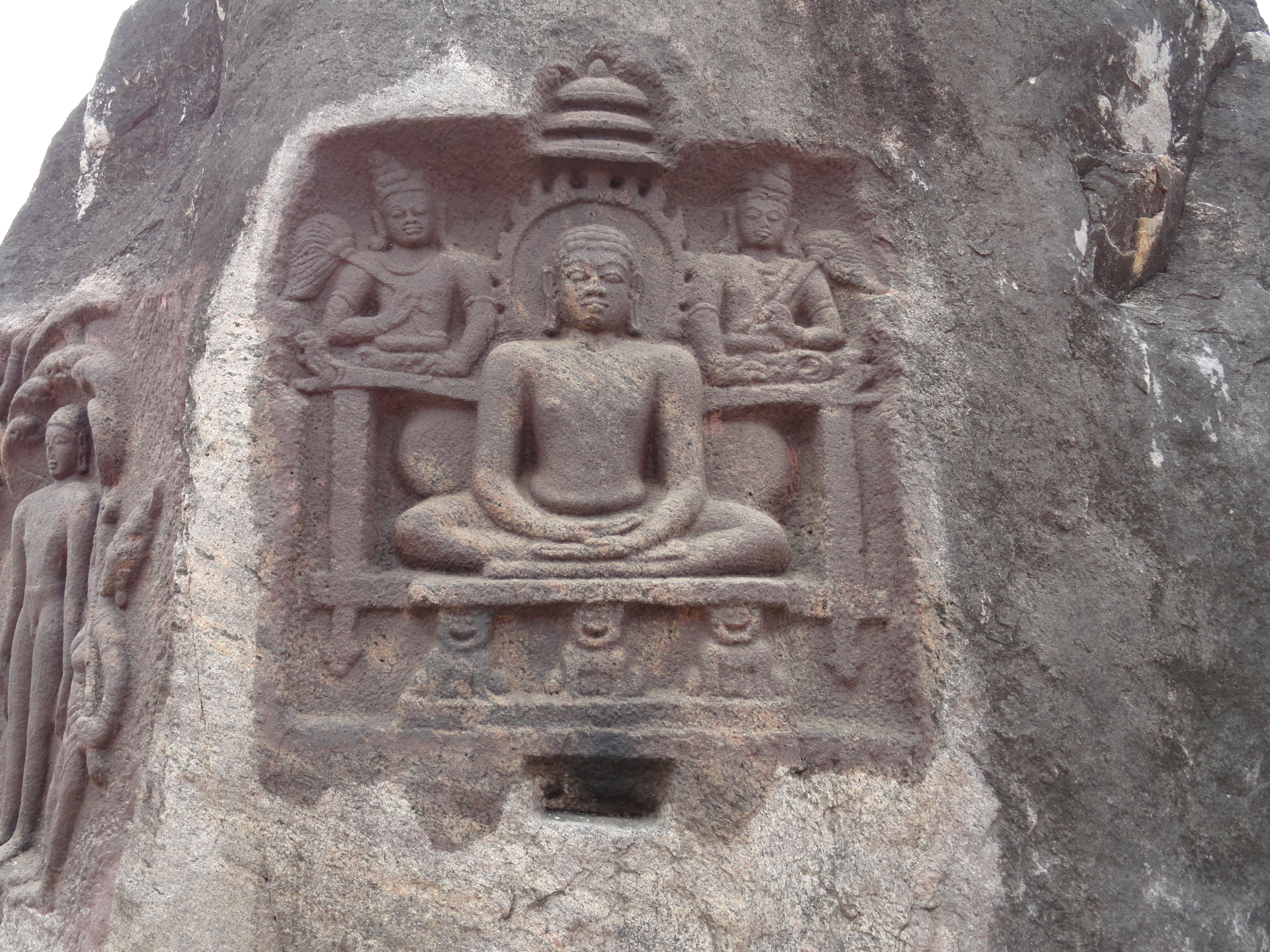
Ancient image of Mahavira at Thirakoil

The idol of Mahavira is carried out on a chariot, in a procession called rath yatra. On the way stavans (religious rhymes) are recited. Statues of Mahavira are given a ceremonial anointment called the abhisheka. During the day, most members of the Jain community engage in some sort of charitable act, prayers, pujas, and vratas. Many devotees visit temples dedicated to Mahavira to meditate and offer prayers. Lectures by monks and nuns are held in temples to preach the path of virtue as defined by Jainism. Donations are collected in order to promote charitable missions like saving cows from slaughter or helping to feed poor people. Ancient Jain temples across India typically see an extremely high volume of practitioners come to pay their respects and join in the celebrations. Ahimsa runs and rallies preaching Mahavira's message of Ahiṃsā (non-violence) are taken out on this day.

== See also ==
- Diwali (Jainism)
- Jain rituals
- Jain festivals
- Kshamavani
- God in Jainism
- Parshvanatha
- Digambara
- Timeline of Jainism
- Shruta Panchami

== Sources ==
- Jain, Kailash Chand (1991), Lord Mahāvīra and His Times, Motilal Banarsidass, ISBN 978-81-208-0805-8
- Jain, Pannalal (2015), Uttarapurāṇa of Āchārya Guṇabhadra, Bhartiya Jnanpith, ISBN 978-81-263-1738-7
- Jalaj, Dr. Jaykumar (2011), The Basic Thought of Bhagavan Mahavir, Mumbai: Hindi Granth Karyalay, ISBN 978-81-88769-41-4
- Sangave, Vilas Adinath (1980), Jain Community: A Social Survey (2nd ed.), Bombay: Popular Prakashan, ISBN 978-0-317-12346-3
