= Swami Satyabhakta =

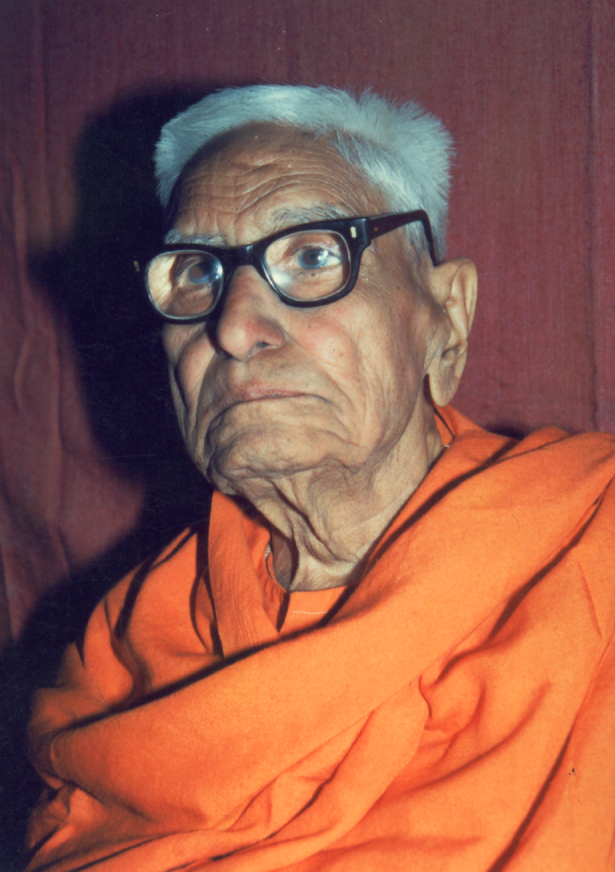

Personal life
- Born: 10 November 1899 Shahpur, Sagar District, Madhya Pradesh
- Died: 10 December 1998 (aged 99) Wardha, Maharashtra
- Notable work: Manav Dharmashastra (1951) etc.
- Honors: Nyayacharya, Swami

Religious life
- Religion: Jainism
- Philosophy: syncretic and rationalistic

Religious career
- Teacher: Shiksha-Guru Ganeshprasad Varni

Quotation

"भाई पढ़ले यह संसार, खुला हुआ है महा शास्त्र, यह शास्त्रों का आधार"

Swami Satyabhakta (Hindi: स्वामी सत्यभक्त, born as Darbarilal; 10 November 1899 – 10 December 1998) was an Indian scholar, philosopher, reformer and the founder of Satya Samaj.

== Early life ==
Born Mulchand at Shahpur, Sagar, he moved to Damoh to his aunt's house after the death of his mother at age 4, where he was renamed Darbarilal. He met Ganeshprasad Varni at Damoh and influenced by him, he joined the pathshala established by Varniji at Sagar. At age 19, he graduated with the title Nyayatirth and became a teacher at Sdyavad Vdyalaya at Varanasi for a year. He then moved to Seoni and then Indore, where he developed his rationalistic principles.

In 1923, he became a reformer. He lived in Bombay during 1926-1936, where he edited Jain Jagat and Jain Prakash. He started writing a series of articles that were later compiled into Jain Dharma Samiksha. He eventually moved to Wardha in 1936 and established his Ashrama there.

== Works ==
He was a prolific author. His writings include Buddhahridayam, Jain Dharma Mimansa, Mahavira Ka Antahsthal, Manav Bhasha, Meri Africa Yatra, Anmol Patra etc. Swamiji worked hard to evolve in 1945-46 the new language which swamiji called Manav Bhasa of which grammar is complete and having no exceptions and very simple and can be learn in a month. "Aditi" of Sri Aurobindo Ashram wrote four pages about Manavbhasha. Swamiji compare Manavbhasha with Esperanto another language by Zamenhof a Polish Eye Surgen in 1887 and a book named Esperanto verses Manav Bhasha was published in 1971.

His early work was published as Darbarilal Nyayatirtha (as an orthodox Jain scholar) Darbarilal Satyabhakta during the transitional period. He contested against Zakir Husain in the 1967 Indian presidential election but failed to win any votes.

He composed a complete library of texts include three volumes of Satyamrita or Manava Dharmashastra. They include Drishti Kanda, a text on philosophy; Achara Kanda, a treatise on conduct of advanced individuals, analogous to Jain Acharnaga; and Vyavahara Kanda, on which is analogous to Dharma Shastra of Manu or Shravakacharas in the Jain tradition. He also composed a set of prayers towards Satyar deities, published as Satya Sangita. He wrote a text Nirativada on social economics, that advocated an economic system that avoids the extremes of Marxism and Capitalism. His Vivaha Paddhati formulates a new form of marriage based on the traditional ceremony.

== Satya Samaj ==
The religious/philosophical movement Satya Samaj founded by him in 1934 and is active in several regions of India and UK. Satya Samaj organizes yearly conventions.

Swami Satyabhakta established a Satya Mandir temple at Vardha with a new pantheon that includes Lord Satya (truth) as the father and Goddess Ahimsa (non-violence) as the mother. While her right hand in the abhaya mudra, she hold a club in her left hand, symbolising that bravery is needed to preserve peace. The altar also has 8 images of the prophets belonging to various religious traditions, including Zoroaster and Karl Marx.

There are Satyar temples at Ayodhya and Barasiya, Bhopal.

== Influence ==
He was an early rationalistic syncretic philosopher. Osho has described meeting him and discussing on establishing a new religious order While he was in Bombay, he was a friend of both Nathuram Premi and Sukhlal Sanghvi known for their open minded perspective.
