= Jai Kumar Jalaj =

Indian writer (1934–2024)

Jai Kumar Jalaj (2 October 1934 – 15 February 2024) was an Indian writer and figure of Hindi literature.

== Life and career ==
Jalaj born in Lalitpur, British India on 2 October 1934. He was educated in and later taught at Allahabad University. He started his career as a lecturer of Hindi in colleges of Madhya Pradesh. The colleges included those in Satna, Rewa, Bareli, Sehore, all run by the Government of Madhya Pradesh. He taught in the Government Arts & Science Post-Graduate College, Ratlam, as first as Professor and Head of Hindi department for 10 years and then from 1981 as principal for 13 years. Jalaj died on 15 February 2024, at the age of 89.

== Books authored ==
- 'Kinaare Se Dhaar Tak' (Poems, 2013) Published by Triveni Prakashan, Allahabad & Hindi Granth Karyalay, Mumbai. ISBN 978-81-88769-81-0.
- 'Suraj si Astha' (Poems, 1958),
- 'Sanskrit Natyasastra: Ek Punarvicara' (Research and review, 1962),
- 'Dhvani Aur Dhvanigram Sastra' (Linguistics, 1962),
- 'Aitihasika Bhasa Vijnan' (1972, 2001),
- 'Sanskrit aur Hindi Nataka: Racana evam Rangakarma' (Research and review 1985, 2000),
- BHAGAVAN MAHAVIR KA BUNIYADI CHINTAN First published in 2002 34st Hindi Edition, 2012 ISBN 978-81-88769-79-7 Published by Hindi Granth Karyalay, Mumbai and translated in 9 languages
- Seva Nivratt Hain - Bhajan Main Aaiye, First Published in 2021 उपग्रह प्रकाशन स्टेशन रोड रतलाम

== Translations ==
- (from Sanskrit)

RATNAKARANDA SRAVAKACARA by Acarya Samantabhadra Pandit Nathuram Premi Research Series Volume 2 (Three editions: 2006, 2006, 2012) ISBN 978-81-88769-04-9

SAMADHITANTRA by Acarya Pujyapada Pandit Nathuram Premi Research Series Volume 5 (Three editions: 2006, 2006, 2008) ISBN 978-81-88769-06-3

TATTVARTHASUTRA by Acarya Prabhacandra Pandit Nathuram Premi Research Series Volume 7 (One edition: 2009) ISBN 978-81-88769-16-2

TATTVARTHASUTRA by Acarya Prabhacandra Pandit Nathuram Premi Research Series Volume 20 (One edition: 2012) ISBN 978-81-88769-31-5

- Pūjyapāda. "Iṣṭopadeśa". Sanskrit text, Hindi translation, Introduction and Shloka Index. Hindi translation by Dr Jaykumar Jalaj. Edited by Manish Modi. Pandit Nathuram Premi Research Series Volume 14. Mumbai: Hindi Granth Karyalay, 2007. ISBN 978-81-88769-23-0.

ISTOPADESA by Acarya Pujyapada Pandit Nathuram Premi Research Series Volume 14 (Three editions: 2007, 2009, 2013) ISBN 978-81-88769-23-0

- (from Apabhramsha)

PARAMATMAPRAKASA by Acarya Joindu Pandit Nathuram Premi Research Series Volume 9 (One edition: 2007) ISBN 978-81-88769-09-4

YOGASARA by Acarya Joindu Pandit Nathuram Premi Research Series Volume 10 (Two editions: 2007, 2009) ISBN 978-81-88769-12-4

- (from Prakrit)

ATTHAPAHUDA by Acarya Kundakunda Pandit Nathuram Premi Research Series Volume 6 (Three editions: 2006, 2008, 2013) ISBN 978-81-88769-15-5

DHYANASATAKA by Kshamashramana Jinabhadragani Pandit Nathuram Premi Research Series Volume 12 (Two editions: 2009, 2008) ISBN 978-81-88769-21-6

RAYANASARA by Acarya Kundakunda Pandit Nathuram Premi Research Series Volume 21 (One edition: 2011) ISBN 978-81-88769-32-2

DRAVYASAMGRAHA by Acarya Nemicandra Pandit Nathuram Premi Research Series Volume 24 (One edition: 2009) ISBN 978-81-88769-37-7

SAMAYASARA by Acarya Kundakunda Pandit Nathuram Premi Research Series Volume 30 (Two editions: 2012) ISBN 978-81-88769-80-3

PRAVACANASARA by Acarya Kundakunda Paras Moolchand Chatter Charitable Trust (One edition: 2014)

== Honours ==
Jai Kumar Jalaj was honoured by various awards: 1967: Kamata Prasada Guru Award, Vishvanatha Award 1987: Madhya Pradesh Government Bhoj Award 1998: Sahitya Sarasvat award by Hindi Sahitya Sammelan
