= Sukhlal Sanghvi =

Indian Jain philosopher (1880–1978)

Pt. Sukhlal Sanghvi
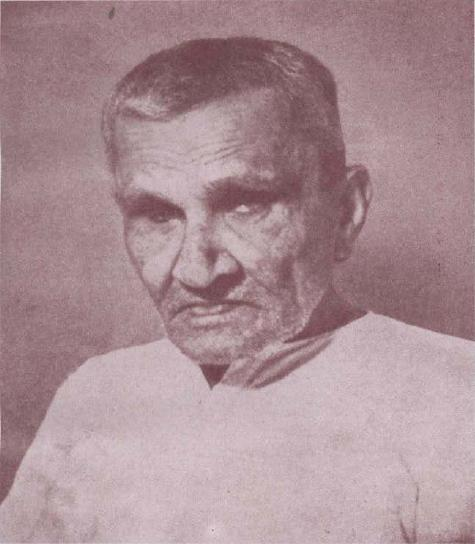
- Pandit Sukhlalji
- Born: 8 December 1880; Limli, (Saurashtra), Gujarat
- Died: 2 March 1978 (aged 97); Gujarat
- Occupations: Writer, Philosopher, Editor, Linguist and Scholar

Sukhlal Sanghvi (8 December 1880 – 2 March 1978), also known as Pandit Sukhlalji, was a Jain scholar and philosopher. He belonged to the Sthanakvasi sect of Jainism. Pandit Sukhlal lost his eyesight at the age of sixteen on account of smallpox. However, he persisted and became profoundly versed in Jain logic and rose to become a professor at Banaras Hindu University. Paul Dundas calls him one of the most incisive modern interpreters of Jain philosophy. Dundas notes that Sanghavi represents what now seems to be a virtually lost scholarly and intellectual world. He was a mentor for famous Jain scholar Padmanabh Jaini. During his lifetime he won such awards as the Sahitya Akademi Award and won recognition from the Government of India by getting Padma Bhushan award. Sukhlalji was also known as Pragnachaksu because he was so vastly learned despite being visually disabled.

== Early life ==
Sukhlal was born in the village of Limli village of Surendranagar district, Gujarat on 8 December 1880 (fifth day of the bright day of the month of Margshirsh in Vikram Samvat 1937). He belonged to Visa Shrimali Vanik community (merchant community) of Gujarat. Talshi Sanghvi and his first wife Maniben were his parents. His mother died when he was four years old. He was raised in Limli by his distant relative, Muljibhai from Sayla. He lost his eyesight following small pox infection when he was sixteen. This made him more introspective and he devoted his life to learning.

== Education ==
He attended discourses of Jain monks, and studied scriptures with the help of a reader. In 1904, he joined Shri Yashovijaya Jain Sanskrit Pathshala at Benaras, where he studied philosophy and linguistics, focusing his early years on mastering the Siddha-Hema-vyakarana, an eighth-century text on Prakrit grammar. Besides grammar, he studied Tarkasamraha, Muktavali, and Vyaptichakra with various commentaries. He also became well-conversant with epics like Raghuvamsha, Maghakavya, and Naishadhacharitam, besides Alamkarashastra and Kosha. For further studies he went to Mithila in 1911, where he studied with the scholar Balakrishna Mishra, and then to Varanasi where he began translating and commenting on works of Jain literature and philosophy. Later, he went to Agra where he edited important Jain works like Panchapratikramana, the first four Karma granthas of Devendrasuri. and Yogadarsana and Yogavimshika of Haribhadra Suri. After passing Nyayacarya examination he continued to teach at Jain pathshalas where his students included future scholar-monks like Muni Jinvijay, Muni Lalitvijay and Muni Punyavijay.

== Career as a scholar and a philosopher ==
In 1922, he joined Puratattva Mandir of Gujarat Vidyapith as professor of Indian philosophy. Here he edited Sanamatitarka of Siddhasena Divakara in five volumes containing valuable indices and appendices. He was assisted by Pandit Bechardasji in this task. From 1934 to 1944 he was the Chair of Jain Philosophy at Benaras Hindu University. He devoted most of his time to writing and editing a number of valuable works in Sanskrit, Hindi, and Gujarati. He edited Tattvarthasutra and Nyayavatara in Gujarati with texts and translations. He edited Pramana-mimamsa by Hemacandra, with detailed introduction and notes. He not only corrected the original readings with the help of the photocopies of the original manuscripts but also gave other comparative readings. He critically edited Jayarashi's Tatavapaplava—a systematic work of Charvakas which brought him wide recognition. He threw new light on the history of Buddhist philosophy by editing Archata's commentary on Dharmakirti's Hetubindu. After retirement from Banaras Hindu University in 1944, he came back to Bharatiya Vidya Bhavan where he worked with Jain monk Acarya Jinavijayaji. In 1957, Sukhlalji was invited by the M.S. University of Baroda to deliver five lectures on Indian philosophy, which were published in Gujarati (1951), Hindi (1971) and English (1977). His scholarly lectures or Atma-Paramatma and Sadhana delivered at Gujarat Vidyasabha were also published in Hindi and Gujarati under the title of Adhyatma vicharana The University of Bombay also invited him for lectures on Acharya Haribhadra, which were published both in Gujarati (1961) and in Hindi (1966).

A compilation of his critical essays on religion, philosophy, travel, and criticism, comprising nearly the entire body of his writing in Gujarati, was published with the title, Darshan ane Chintan (Philosophy and Reflections). This book won the Sahitya Akademi Award for Gujarati in 1958. The essays in this compilation touched on several topics, including cattle-breeding, untouchability, women's rights, and language politics in India.

== Legacy and influences ==
Young Sukhlalji was inspired by the writings of Pandit Nathuram Premi, who was to become a close family friend. Sukhlalji was non-sectarian in his attitude and shared a good rapport with many Digambara scholars like Premiji and observed their mutual respect:

"He (Premiji) was considered to be a Pandit—a scholar of Jain tradition. To me it was a surprise! How could his writings be so impartial and audacious? I had come in contact with many Jain friends and scholars, but until then, excepting a few, I had not come across any scholar who was as non-sectarian or fearless as Premiji. So I had developed the perception that it was impossible to find a Jain scholar who was non-sectarian as well as fearless. Premiji's writings gradually made me realize that I had the wrong notion. This was the foremost reason for me to be attracted towards him.
[...]
We had an excellent understanding of traditions of one another but we had no sectarian complicities."

Sukhlalji also mentored three scholars of Jainism – Mahendrakumar Nyayacarya, Padmanabh Jaini and Dalsukh Malvania. Out of these, the second and third were his direct students. Sukhlalji always insisted on learning of Pali Canon for understanding Jainism and encouraged young Padmanabh Jaini to visit Sri Lanka to study Buddhism. Author B. K. Matilal notes that Sukhlalji advocated "a non-partisan historical comparative study of any Sanskrit philosophical text" and noted in his preface to Advanced Studies in Indian Logic and Metaphysics (1961): "I became firmly convinced that the study of any philosophical system inevitably demands certain prerequisites and these prerequisites include a fairly accurate understanding of the historical inter-relationships between the various philosophical systems of India."

Pandit Sukhlalji worked with a vast array of scholars including Muni Jinvijay, Muni Punyavijaya, Acarya Prem Suri, Pandit Nathuram Premi, Pandit Jugalkishore Mukhtar, Dr. Hiralal Jain, Dr A. N. Upadhye, Dr. Mahendrakumar Nyayacarya, Prof. Dr. Padmanabh Jaini, Dr. Dalsukh Dahyabhai Malvania and Dr. Nagin J. Shah.

== Awards and Doctorates ==
- He was awarded Vijai Dharm Soori Jain Sahitya Gold Medal in 1947.
- He was honoured by the degree of D.Litt. by the Gujarat University in 1957, the Sardar Patel University in 1967 and the Saurashtra University in 1973.
- His admirers had formed Pandit Shri Sukhlalji Samman Samiti in his honour and he was honoured in 1957 at Bombay under the Presidency of Dr. Radhakrishnan. He was given a bag of seventy thousand rupees on this occasion. Panditji formed Gnanodaya Trust with this amount and decided to use this amount for the expansion and creation of Indian religion and philosophy.
- The Sahitya Akademi, India's National Academy of Letters, awarded him the Sahitya Akademi Award and prize of five thousand rupees for his Darshan ane Chintan, a compilation of philosophical essays in 1958. The Government of Bombay also gave him prize for this work.
- The Government of India granted him pension in 1961 by giving him Certificate of honor for Sanskrit.
- The Government of India honored him by awarding Padma Bhushan in 1974.
- He was awarded the title of Vidya Varidhi by Nav Nalanda Vihar of Bihar in 1975.

President of India, Dr. Radhakrishnan, himself a reputed philosopher and scholar paid glowing tributes to Sukhlalji by saying that his life was that of an ascetic performing Jnanayajna (Worship of Knowledge).

== Works ==
Sukhlalji was a prolific writer. He edited and translated many texts from Sanskrit to Gujarati and Hindi. A partial list of his works is enumerated below:

- Translation of Umasvati’s Tattvarthasutra in Gujarati and Hindi.
  - Sanghvi, Sukhlal (1974). Commentary on Tattvārthasūtra of Vācaka Umāsvāti. trans. by K. K. Dixit. Ahmedabad: L. D. Institute of Indology.
- Translation and editing of Sanmatitarka of Siddhasena Divākara.
- Translation and editing of kṛta Vedavādadvātriṃśikā of Siddhasena Divākara.
  - S. Divākara and S. Sanghvī (1945). Siddhasena Divākara kṛta Vedavādadvātriṃśikā. Mumbai, Bhāratīya Vidyā Bhavana.
- Translation and editing of Nyāyāvatāra sūtra of Siddhasena Divākara (On Jain Logic, Sanskrit text and Gujarati explanation)
  - Siddhasena Divākara and Sukhalāla Sanghvī. 1995. Nyāyāvatāra sūtra. Śrī Śvetāmbara Mūrtipūjaka Boarding granthamālā, 7. Ahmedabad: Śāradābena Cīmanabhāī Educational Research Series.
- Pacifism and Jainism. Publisher: Jain Cultural Research Society, Banaras Hindu University, 1950.
- Samaj Dharma ane Sanskruti (સમાજ, ધર્મ અને સંસ્કૃતિ) Publisher: Gurjar Granthratna Karyalaya – Ahmedabad
- Anekant Chintan (અનેકાંત ચિંતન) Publisher: Gurjar Granthratna Karyalaya – Ahmedabad
- Karmagranth of Devendrasuri (4 Parts–Karmvipak Karmstav Bandhswamitva and Shadshitik) – Translation in Hindi from Sanskrit. Publisher: Parshvanath Vidhyashram - Varanasi

== See also ==
- List of Gujarati-language writers
- Jain philosophy
- Tattvarthasutra
