= Nathuram Premi =

Indian writer, publisher and poet (1881–1960)

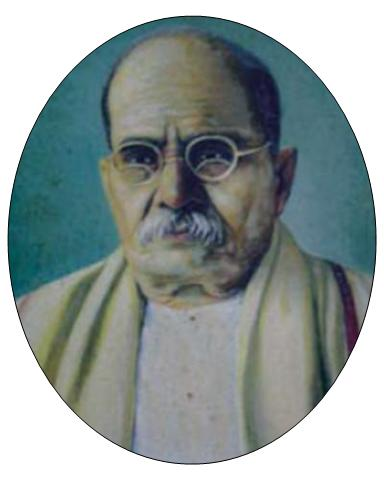
- Nathuram Premi
- Born: 26 November 1881; Deori, Sagar, (Bundelkhand), Madhya Pradesh
- Died: 30 January 1960 (aged 78); Mumbai, Maharashtra
- Occupations: Writer; publisher; poet; editor; linguist; scholar
- Spouse: Rama Devi

Nathuram Premi (26 November 1881 – 30 January 1960) was an Indian writer, publisher, poet, editor, and linguist in the field of Jainism as well as Hindi literature. A budding poet, he wrote under the nom de plume of "Premi". Although belonging to the Digambara sect of Jainism, he adopted a non-sectarian attitude and published and translated many Digambara as well as Śvetāmbara works. Working as a clerk in a firm in Mumbai he rose to establish his own publishing house and bookstore Hindi Granth Ratnākar Kāryālay which published works of many of the biggest names in Indian literature, including Munshi Premchand, Hajariprasad Dvivedi, Jainendrakumar, Yashpal, Swami Satyabhakta, Sharatchandra Chatterjee and Rabindranath Tagore. The bookshop and publishing house now called Hindi Granth Karyalay is now being managed by his grandson and great-grandson 100 years after its establishment.

== Early life ==
Born on 26 November 1881 in Deori, in the district of Sagar in Bundelkhand, Madhya Pradesh, Nāthūrām Premī was the eldest child of Tundelal Modi, a travelling merchant of modest means, belonging to the Paravāra community of Digambara Jains hailing from Bundelkhand. He studied in grammar school and was the monitor of his class. He cleared his pre-high school exams in 1898 and became a schoolteacher nearby at Rehli. In the late 1890s, he married Rama Devi, who was from the nearby village of Sarkheda, in the district of Sagar.

== Career in Hindi and Jain literature ==
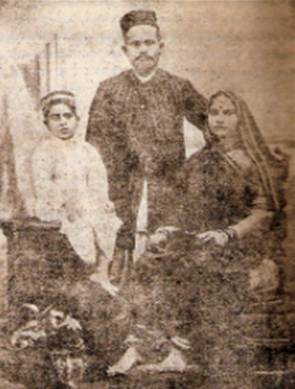
Premiji's family in 1913 CE: Premiji along with his young son, Hemchandra and wife, Ramadevi

Nāthūrām Premī excelled in the field of literature as a poet, editor, writer and publisher earning respect and affection of his contemporaries like Munshi Premchand, Mahaviraprasad Dwivedi, Rahul Sankrityayan, Pandit Sukhlalji, Muni Jinavijayaji, Ganeshprasadji Varni, Pandit Becharadasji Doshi, Pandit Agarchand Nahata and Dr Dalsukh Malvania. Premiji and Munshi Premchand were close friends, and he published the first edition of Munshi Premchand's classic novel, Godān. He also published Premchand's short story collections entitled Nava Nidhi and Sapta Saroj.

=== A budding poet ===
Under the inspiration of his guru Syed Amir Ali Mir, Nathuram became a budding poet, writing in Urdu and Braj under the nom de plume of "Premi". Since then he was affectionately called Premiji by his friends and contemporaries. His poems were published in the literary magazines of the time, Rasika Mitra, Rasika Vātikā and Kāvya Sudhākara.

=== Editor and writer ===
 While he was working for the Digambara Jain Tīrthakṣetra Committee, Premiji also edited Jain Mitra, making it one of the most influential Jain magazines of that era. In 1912, he founded the Jain Hitaiṣī, a Jain magazine with a reformist and questioning approach. Jain Hitaiṣī was known for the forthright views of its editorials and academically sound articles on Jain history, culture and society. His Jain Sāhitya aur Itihās, is a collection of articles that he wrote for Jain Mitra and Jain Hitaiṣī, which set the benchmark for scholarly research into Jain history.

He also edited classics such as the Banārasīvilāsa, Daulatapadasangraha, Jinaśataka and Ardha Kathānaka. Premiji also edited and published Ardha Kathānaka, Banārasīvilāsa and many other Digambara Jain works, including Ācārya Kundakunda's Bārasa Anuvekkhā and Ācārya Amrtacandra's Puruṣāthadiddhyupāya. He also edited and published for the first time, the Śvetāmbara classic Upamitibhavaprañcakathā.

=== Establishment of Hindi Granth Karyalay ===
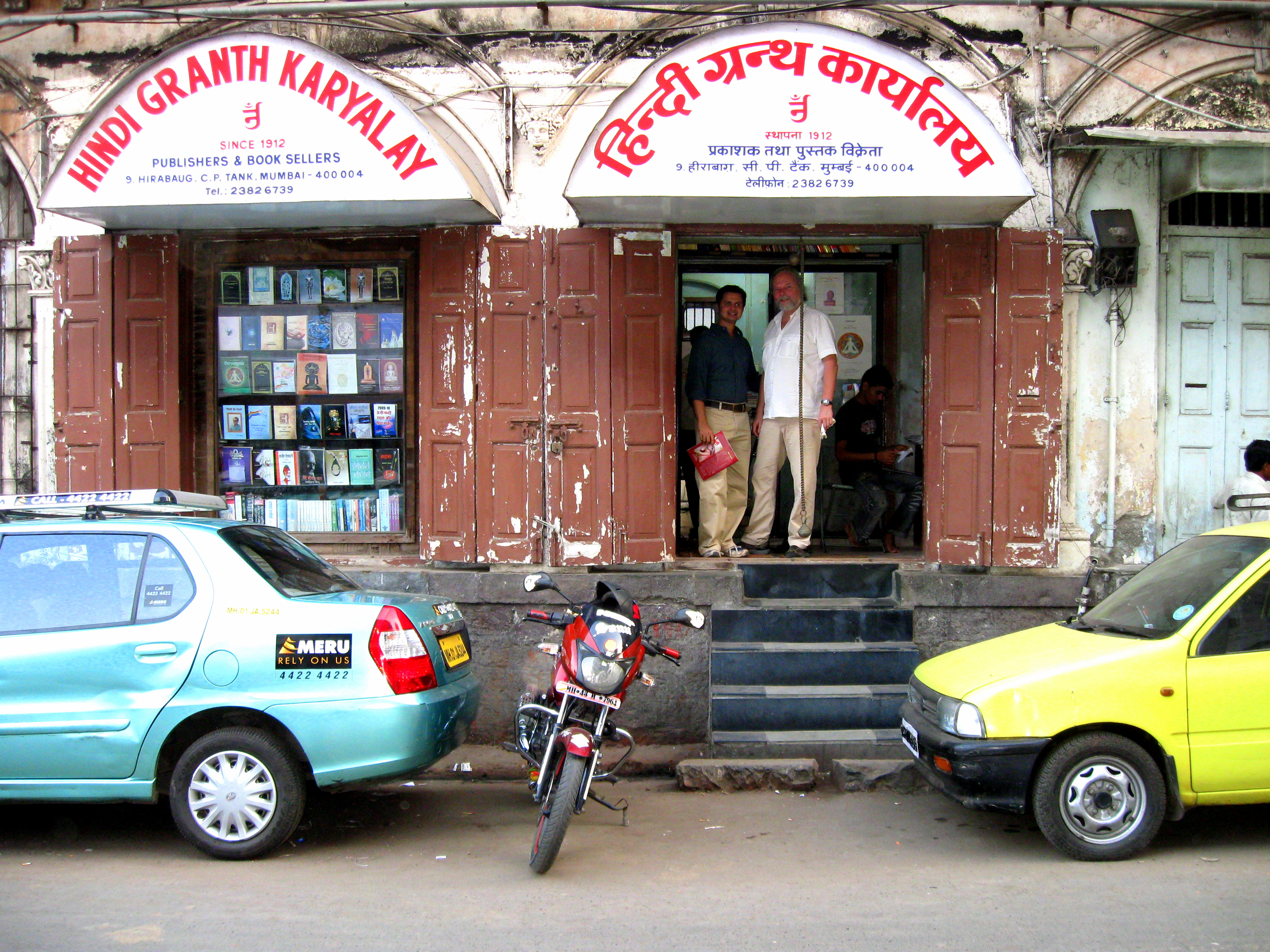
Hindi Granth Karyalay at Hirabaug, C.P. Tank, Mumbai founded by Pandit Nathuram Premi in 1912

On 24 September 1912 Premiji founded the publishing house Hindi Granth Ratnākar Kāryālay (now known as Hindi Granth Karyalay) at C.P. Tank, Mumbai. It was to become the foremost Hindi publishing house in India and is also the oldest bookstore of Mumbai. The first publication was a Hindi translation of John Stuart Mill's On Liberty, titled Svādhīnatā translated by Mahavira Prasad Dvivedi. He published almost the entire oeuvre of Sharat Chandra Chatterji, the Bengali writer, and some works of Rabindranath Tagore, such as Ānkh kī Kirkirī, and Naukā Dūbī. Premiji also published Hindi translations of the Gujarati writer KM Munshi, such as Gujarāt ke Nāth and Pātan kā Prabhutva. Other famous works published include Munshi Premchand's classic novel, Godān and short story collections titled Nava Nidhi and Sapta Saroj. He also published works of then new writers such as Hajariprasad Dvivedi, Jainendrakumar, Yashpal, Acharya Chatursen, and Pandit Sudarshan. He also published the Bengali plays of Dvijendra Lal Rai for the first time in Hindi.

In memory of Seth Manikchandra, Premiji established the Manikacandra Jain Granthamālā wherein he published Jain scriptures, for the first time systematically edited by philologists. The Manikacandra Jain Granthamālā published over 48 Digambara Jain texts, mostly written in Prakrit, Apabhramśa or Sanskrit. He ran the Manikacandra Jain Granthamālā on an honorary basis between 1915 and the 1950s selling all the books at cost price. When his health began to fail, it was decided to hand over the series to Bhāratīya Jñānapītha in Varanasi.

=== A non-sectarian Jain scholar ===
Premiji was non-sectarian in his attitude and shared a good rapport with many Śvetāmbara scholars. Besides many Digambara scriptures, he published and translated many Śvetāmbara scriptures. He once remarked to Sukhlalji that he wished that the learned Digambara scholars would give up their sectarian views. During those times there used to be heated debate whether Acarya Umāsvāti (Umāsvāmī) belonged to the Śvetāmbara or the Digambara tradition. Premiji, although a Digambara himself, went against views of Digambara community and opined that he was neither, but belonged to the Yāpanīya tradition. Pt. Sukhlal Sanghvi, a Śvetāmbara Jain scholar observed Premiji's non-sectarian attitude:

"He was considered to be a Pandit – a scholar of Jain tradition. To me it was a surprise! How could his writings be so impartial and audacious? I had come in contact with many Jain friends and scholars, but until then, excepting a few, I had not come across any scholar who was as non-sectarian or fearless as Premiji. So I had developed the perception that it was impossible to find a Jain scholar who was non-sectarian as well as fearless. Premiji's writings gradually made me realise that I had the wrong notion. This was the foremost reason for me to be attracted towards him.
[...]
We had an excellent understanding of traditions of one another but we had no sectarian complicities."

=== Contribution to other Indian languages ===
Premiji was adept at several languages. One of his mentors, Pannalal Bakhliwal, taught him Bengali and on his own, he studied and mastered Gujarati and Marathi. His Sanskrit background helped him to learn Prakrit and Apabhramśa, His command of languages as well as grasp of Jain Philosophy resulted in requests for translation of ancient Jain texts. At the behest of the Srīmad Rājacandra Granthamālā, he translated from Gujarati into Hindi Śrīmad Rājacandra's Mokṣamālā. This translation was unique in that he translated the prose segments into prose and the poetry into verse form. He also translated Ācārya Amrtacandra's Puruṣārthasiddhyupāya from Sanskrit to Hindi.

=== Social reformer ===
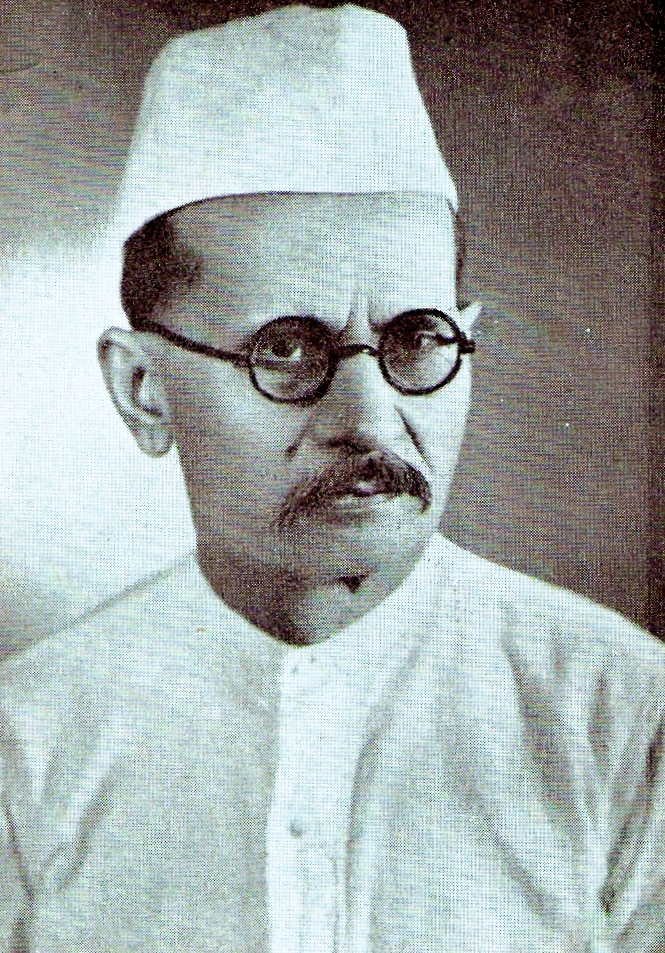
Premiji in 1946

Under the editorship of Premiji, Jain Mitra became a progressive magazine challenging the Jain community to change with the times and give up its orthodoxy. Jain Mitra became a masthead for all those who wanted the Jain community to move forward. He was at the centre of this movement for social freedom, universal progress and modern education. He also began advocating widow remarriage. This was unheard of in the conservative Jain community of that time and there was much opposition. But other Jain reformers, such as Kṣullaka Ganeshprasadji Varni of Bundelkhand, publicly backed Premiji. In 1914, Premiji and Varniji both addressed a rally at Sonagiri, a Digambara Jain place of pilgrimage in Bundelkhand, where they publicly declared their support for widow remarriage.

Pt. Sukhlal Sanghavi praised reforms initiated by Premiji and compared him with King Ajātaśatru who personified openness and generosity:

"During his formative years, he had been exposed to narrow traditional culture traits. Nevertheless, his social convictions had become extremely progressive, similar to his religious convictions. Thus, in his household, there was never the confining custom of women covering their faces. Hem Chandra's wife Champa, who was quite young and pretty, had as much freedom to conduct herself in the presence of all as did Ramabahin, or Hem Chandra, or Premiji himself. Premiji was a reformer in the true sense. He had his own brother married the second time to a widow, without any concern about the wrath of the orthodox traditionalist. Observing the conduct of Champa with Premiji, a stranger could not tell that she was his daughter-in-law. He/she would think that Champa was his only daughter – close to his heart. It was an atmosphere of complete freedom around Premiji. Orthodox and reformer, both will agree wholeheartedly that Premiji personified Ajātaśatru – a personality in Buddhist literature who embodied freedom, open-mindedness and generosity, who was appreciated by all."

In 1946, a grand luncheon was organised in Calcutta to commemorate the release of a festschrift in his honour, titled "Premī Abhinandana Grantha". However Premiji refused to attend as in that year Bengal had suffered a great famine and he could not accept the invitation for a grand luncheon when there were thousands of people in Bengal dying of starvation.

== Premiji's legacy ==
Under his tutelage, Hindi Granth Ratnākar Kāryālay became India's No. 1 publishers of Hindi literature. In recognition of his contributions to Indian literature, the acclaimed Hindi novelist Vishnu Prabhakar called Premiji the "Bhīsma Pitāmaha" of Hindi publishing.

Front and back cover of Tattvārthasūtra by Prabhācandra – Volume 7 of Pandit Nathuram Premi Research Series (2008)

Premiji had suffered from asthma for a long time and died owing to old age on 30 January 1960. He left behind his daughter-in-law and two grandsons, Yashodhar Modi and Vidyadhar Modi. They are continuing his legacy along with their children.

In Premiji's memory, his grandson Yashodhar Modi has started the Pandit Nathuram Premi Research Series. This series has published select volumes focusing on subjects as varied as Jainism, philosophy and yoga and published original texts by ancient and medieval Jain ascetics such as Kundakunda, Samantabhadra, Pūjyapāda, Joindu, Prabhācandra, Vādirāja, Bhāvadeva and many others, usually accompanied by translation in either Hindi or English.

Also, modern scholars such as Premiji himself, Prof. Ludwig Alsdorf, Prof. Maurice Bloomfield, Prof. Willem Bollée and Dr. Jaykumar Jalaj have been and are being published in the Pandit Nathuram Premi Research Series.

== Pandit Nathuram Premi Research Series ==
Jain Studies : Their Present State and Future Tasks By Prof Dr Ludwig Alsdorf English tr. by Bal Patil P {Pandit Nathuram Premi Research Series Volume 1} Published in 2006 ISBN 978-81-88769-13-1

The Story of Paesi Prakrit text in Roman and Devanagari English tr. by Prof Dr Willem Bollée {Pandit Nathuram Premi Research Series Volume 2} Published in 2005 ISBN 978-81-88769-03-2

Ratnakaranda Shravakacara Sanskrit text by Acarya Samantabhadra Hindi tr. by Dr Jaykumar Jalaj {Pandit Nathuram Premi Research Series Volume 3} Published in 2006, 2006 ISBN 978-81-88769-04-9

Vyavahara Bhashya Pithika Prakrit text in Roman English tr. by Prof Dr Willem Bollée {Pandit Nathuram Premi Research Series Volume 4} Published in 2006, 2011 ISBN 978-81-88769-70-4

Samadhitantra Sanskrit text by Acarya Pujyapada Hindi tr. by Dr Jaykumar Jalaj {Pandit Nathuram Premi Research Series Volume 5} Published in 2006, 2006, 2008 ISBN 978-81-88769-06-3

Atthapahuda Prakrit text by Acarya Kundakunda Hindi tr. by Dr Jaykumar Jalaj {Pandit Nathuram Premi Research Series Volume 6} Published in 2006, 2008 ISBN 978-81-88769-15-5

Tattvarthasutra Sanskrit text by Acarya Prabhacandra Hindi tr. by Dr Jaykumar Jalaj {Pandit Nathuram Premi Research Series Volume 7} Published in 2008 ISBN 978-81-88769-16-2

Yogamrit : Yog Sahaj Jivan Vigyan By Mahavir Sainik {Pandit Nathuram Premi Research Series Volume 8} Published in 2006 ISBN 978-81-88769-17-9

Paramatmaprakasha Apabhramsa text by Acarya Joindu Hindi tr. by Dr Jaykumar Jalaj {Pandit Nathuram Premi Research Series Volume 9} Published in 2007 ISBN 978-81-88769-09-4

Yogasara Apabhramsa text by Acarya Joindu Hindi tr. by Dr Jaykumar Jalaj {Pandit Nathuram Premi Research Series Volume 10} Published in 2007, 2009 ISBN 978-81-88769-12-4

Dhyanastava Sanskrit text by Acarya Bhaskaranandi Hindi tr. by Dr Jaykumar Jalaj {Pandit Nathuram Premi Research Series Volume 11} Published in 2007 ISBN 978-81-88769-20-9

Dhyanashataka Prakrit text by Jinabhadragani Kshamashramana Hindi tr. by Dr Jaykumar Jalaj Published in 2007, 2009 {Pandit Nathuram Premi Research Series Volume 12} ISBN 978-81-88769-21-6

Barasa Anuvekkha Prakrit text by Acarya Kundakunda Sanskrit tr. & Hindi gloss by Pt. Nathuram Premi {Pandit Nathuram Premi Research Series Volume 13} Published in 2010 ISBN 978-81-88769-22-3

Ishtopadesha Sanskrit text by Acarya Pujyapada Hindi tr. by Dr Jaykumar Jalaj {Pandit Nathuram Premi Research Series Volume 14} Published in 2007, 2009 ISBN 978-81-88769-23-0

Life and Stories of the Jain Saviour Parshvanatha An English tr. of Acarya Bhavadeva's Parsvacaritram by Prof Dr Maurice Bloomfield {Pandit Nathuram Premi Research Series Volume 15} Published in 2008 ISBN 978-81-88769-24-7

Tattvasara Prakrit text by Acarya Devasena Sanskrit gloss by Muni Ratnabhanuvijay English tr. by Manish Modi {Pandit Nathuram Premi Research Series Volume 16} ISBN 978-81-88769-25-4

The Apabhramsha of Svayambhudeva's Paumacariu By Dr Eva de Clercq {Pandit Nathuram Premi Research Series Volume 17} Published in 2010 ISBN 978-81-88769-28-5

Jainism and the Definition of Religion By Dr Piotr Balcerowicz {Pandit Nathuram Premi Research Series Volume 18} Published in 2009 ISBN 978-81-88769-29-2

Dravyasamgraha Prakrit text by Acarya Nemicandra English tr. by Prof Dr Nalini Balbir {Pandit Nathuram Premi Research Series Volume 19} Published in 2010 ISBN 978-81-88769-30-8

Tattvarthasutra Sanskrit text by Acarya Prabhacandra Hindi tr. by Dr Jaykumar Jalaj, English tr. by Anish Shah {Pandit Nathuram Premi Research Series Volume 20} ISBN 978-81-88769-31-5

Rayanasara Prakrit text by Acarya Kundakunda Hindi tr. by Dr Jaykumar Jalaj {Pandit Nathuram Premi Research Series Volume 21} ISBN 978-81-88769-32-2.

Jainism : An Eternal Pilgrimage By Bal Patil {Pandit Nathuram Premi Research Series Volume 23} Published in 2008, 2011 ISBN 978-81-88769-54-4

Dravyasamgraha Prakrit text by Acarya Nemicandra Hindi tr. by Dr Jaykumar Jalaj {Pandit Nathuram Premi Research Series Volume 24} Published in 2009 ISBN 978-81-88769-37-7

Parshvanathacaritram Sanskrit text by Acarya Vadiraja {Pandit Nathuram Premi Research Series Volume 25} ISBN 978-81-88769-27-8

Parshvacaritram : The Life of Parshva Sanskrit text by Acarya Gunabhadra English tr. by Prof Dr Willem Bollée {Pandit Nathuram Premi Research Series Volume 26} Published in 2008 ISBN 978-81-88769-35-3

Jain Sahitya aur Itihas By Pt. Nathuram Premi {Pandit Nathuram Premi Research Series Volume 27} Published in 1942, 1956, 2012 ISBN 978-81-88769-02-5

Tales of Atonement Stories from Malayagiri's Commentary on the Vyavahara Bhashya English tr. by Prof Dr Willem Bollée {Pandit Nathuram Premi Research Series Volume 28} Published in 2008 ISBN 978-81-88769-38-4

Yogashastra : A Handbook on the Three Jewels of Jainism Sanskrit text by Acarya Hemacandra English tr. by Prof Dr Olle Qvarnström {Pandit Nathuram Premi Research Series Volume 29} ISBN 978-81-88769-40-7

Samayasara Prakrit text by Acarya Kundakunda Hindi translation by Dr Jaykumar Jalaj {Pandit Nathuram Premi Research Series Volume 30} 2012 ISBN 978-81-88769-45-2

Dhyanabattisi Braj text by Banarasidasa English tr. by Jerome Petit {Pandit Nathuram Premi Research Series Volume 31} Published in 2010 ISBN 978-81-88769-48-3

Tattvarthasutra Sanskrit text by Acarya Umasvati English tr. by Prof Dr Duli Chandra Jain {Pandit Nathuram Premi Research Series Volume 32} ISBN 978-81-88769-50-6

Svarupa Sambodhana Right Instruction on the Nature of the Soul Sanskrit text by Acarya Akalanka English tr., notes and introduction by Nagin J. Shah {Pandit Nathuram Premi Research Series Volume 33} Published in 2011 ISBN 978-81-88769-51-3

Shastrasarasamuccaya Sanskrit text by Acarya Maghanandi English tr. by Shreyans Sukhani {Pandit Nathuram Premi Research Series Volume 34} ISBN 978-81-88769-52-0

Three Prakrit Grammars By Saartje Verbeke {Pandit Nathuram Premi Research Series Volume 35} Published in 2010 ISBN 978-81-88769-55-1

Ishtopadesha Sanskrit text by Acarya Pujyapada Gujarati tr. by Pravina Mehta, English tr. by Manish Modi {Pandit Nathuram Premi Research Series Volume 36} Published in 2010 ISBN 978-81-88769-56-8

Bhaktamara Stotra Sanskrit text by Acarya Manatunga Hindi poetic tr. and gloss by Pt Nathuram Premi, English tr. by Manish Modi {Pandit Nathuram Premi Research Series Volume 37} ISBN 978-81-88769-57-5

Mrityu Mahotsava Sanskrit text by an Unknown Writer Hindi tr. by Shreyans Sukhani, Gujarati tr. by Dr Shilpa Vasani, English tr. by Manish Modi {Pandit Nathuram Premi Research Series Volume 38} Published in 2010 ISBN 978-81-88769-58-2

Aradhanasara Prakrit text by Acarya Devasena English tr. by Prof Dr Nalini Balbir {Pandit Nathuram Premi Research Series Volume 39} Published in 2010 ISBN 978-81-88769-62-9

Tattvarthasutra : That Which Is Sanskrit text by Acarya Umasvati English tr. by Nathmal Tantia {Pandit Nathuram Premi Research Series Volume 40} ISBN 978-81-88769-64-3

Ratnakarandaka Shravakacara Sanskrit text by Acarya Samantabhadra English tr. by Prof Dr Willem Bollée {Pandit Nathuram Premi Research Series Volume 41} 2012 ISBN 978-81-88769-66-7

== Bibliography ==
1. Aggarwal, Vasudev Sharan (Ed.). Premī Abhinandana Grantha. Tikamgarh: Premī Abhinandana Grantha Samiti, 1946.
2. Premī, Nāthūrām. Jain Sāhitya aur Itihās. Second Edition. Mumbai: Samśodhita Sāhitya Mālā Puṣpa 1, 1942/1956.
3. Banārasīdāsa. Ardha Kathānaka. Ed. with a detailed Preface by Nāthūrām Premī. Mumbai: Samśodhita Sāhitya Mālā Puṣpa 2, 1946/1957.
4. Amrtacandra, Ācārya. Puruṣārthasiddhyupāya. Ed. with an Introduction by Nāthūrām Premī. Āgās: Śrīmad Rājacandra Āśrama, 1904.
5. Goyaliya, Ayodhyaprasad. Jain Jāgarana ke Agradūta. Varanasi: Bhāratīya Jñānapītha, 1952
6. Śāstrī, Phūlcandra (Ed.). Paravāra Jain Samāj kā Itihās. Jabalpur: Śrī Bhāratavarṣīya Digambara Jain Paravāra Sabhā, 1992.
7. Pt. Sukhlal, Sanghavi (January–April 2006). "Life of Pandit Nathu Ram Premi: Scholar And Social Reformer". Jain Study Circular. Translated by Sunita Jain; Duli Chandra Jain. New York: Jain Study Circular Inc.
