= Jayasena (Jain monk) =

Personal life
- Born: 1st century CE
- Died: 1st century CE

Religious life
- Religion: Jainism
- Sect: Digambara

Jayasena was a first century Jain monk whose disciple Dhamaghosha donated a temple to Jainism as mentioned in an inscription in Lucknow Museum.
