= Hindi Granth Karyalay =

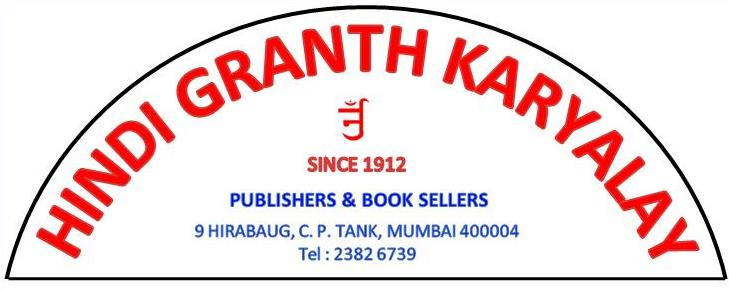
- Status: Active
- Founded: 1912
- Founder: Nathuram Premi
- Successor: Manish Modi
- Country of origin: India
- Headquarters location: 9 Hirabaug, C. P. Tank, Mumbai - 400004
- Distribution: Worldwide
- Key people: Manish Modi, (Owner, Publisher and Author)
- Nonfiction topics: Jainology, Indology
- Fiction genres: Religion, Literature, Philosophy, Mythology
- Official website: http://www.hindibooks.8m.com

Hindi Granth Karyalay is an Indian publishing house and specialized book store dealing in books pertaining to Jainology and Indology in English, Hindi, Sanskrit, Prakrit and Apabhramsha. It was established in Mumbai, India in 1912 by its founder Nathuram Premi. It publishes and distributes serials, monographs, and scholarly publications on Indian religions, philosophy, history, culture, arts, architecture, archaeology, language, literature, linguistics, musicology, mysticism, yoga, tantra, occult, medicine, astronomy, astrology and other related subjects, and to date have published over 100 works of noted Indian and International authors and scholars.

== History ==
=== Establishment ===
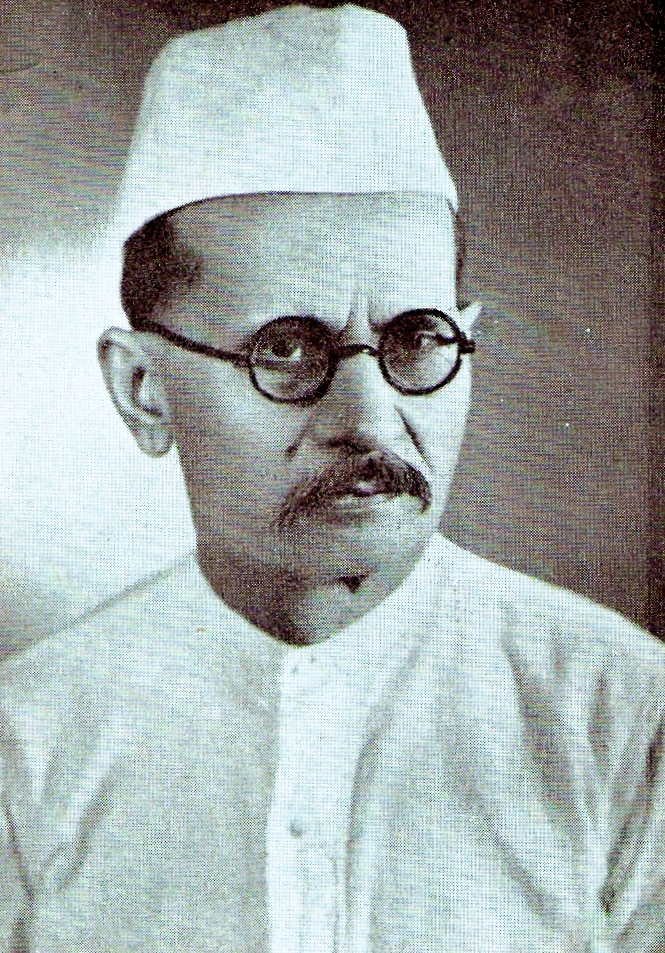
Nathuram Premi, founder of Hindi Granth Karyalay

On 24 September 1912, Pandit Nathuram Premi founded the publishing house Hindi Granth Ratnākar Kāryālay (now known as Hindi Granth Karyalay) at C.P. Tank, Mumbai. It was to become the foremost Hindi publishing house in India and is also the oldest bookstore of Mumbai. Born on 26 November 1881 in Deori, in the district of Sagar in Bundelkhand, Madhya Pradesh, Nāthūrām Premī was the eldest child of Tundelal Modi, a travelling merchant of modest means, belonging to the Paravāra community of Digambara Jains hailing from Bundelkhand. He arrived in Mumbai in 1901, and started working for the Digambara Jain Tīrthakṣetra Committee as a clerk. The owner of Hirabaug, Seth Manikchandra, impressed by his honesty, diligence and intellect asked the young Nāthūrām Premī to take up rooms at the Hirabaug Dharmashala at the heart of the Mumbai market and start his business from there. He accepted the offer and together with Pannalal Bakhliwal started the Jain Granth Ratnākar Kāryālay in 1906. From this humble beginnings, in 1912 he started the publishing house Hindi Granth Ratnākar Kāryālay.

=== Early history ===
The first publication of Hindi Granth Ratnākar Kāryālay was a Hindi translation of John Stuart Mill's Liberty, titled Svādhīnatā translated by Pandit Mahaviraprasad Dvivedi. They published almost the entire oeuvre of Sharat Chandra Chatterji, the great Bengali writer and some works of Rabindranath Tagore, such as Ānkh kī Kirkirī, and Naukā Dūbī. Premiji also published Hindi translations of the Gujarati writer KM Munshi, such as Gujarāt ke Nāth and Pātan kā Prabhutva. Other famous works published include Munshi Premchand's classic novel, Godān and short story collections titled Nava Nidhi and Sapta Saroj. He also published works of then new writers such as Hajariprasad Dvivedi, Jainendrakumar, Yashpal, Acharya Chatursen, and Pandit Sudarshan. He also published the Bengali plays of Dvijendra Lal Rai for the first time in Hindi.

In memory of Seth Manikchandra, Premiji established the Manikacandra Jain Granthamālā wherein he published Jain scriptures, for the first time systematically edited by philologists. The Manikacandra Jain Granthamālā published over 48 Digambara Jain texts, mostly written in Prakrit, Apabhramśa or Sanskrit. He ran the Manikacandra Jain Granthamālā on an honorary basis between 1915 and the 1950s selling all the books at cost price. When his health began to fail, it was decided to hand over the series to Bhāratīya Jñānapītha in Varanasi.

=== Current management ===
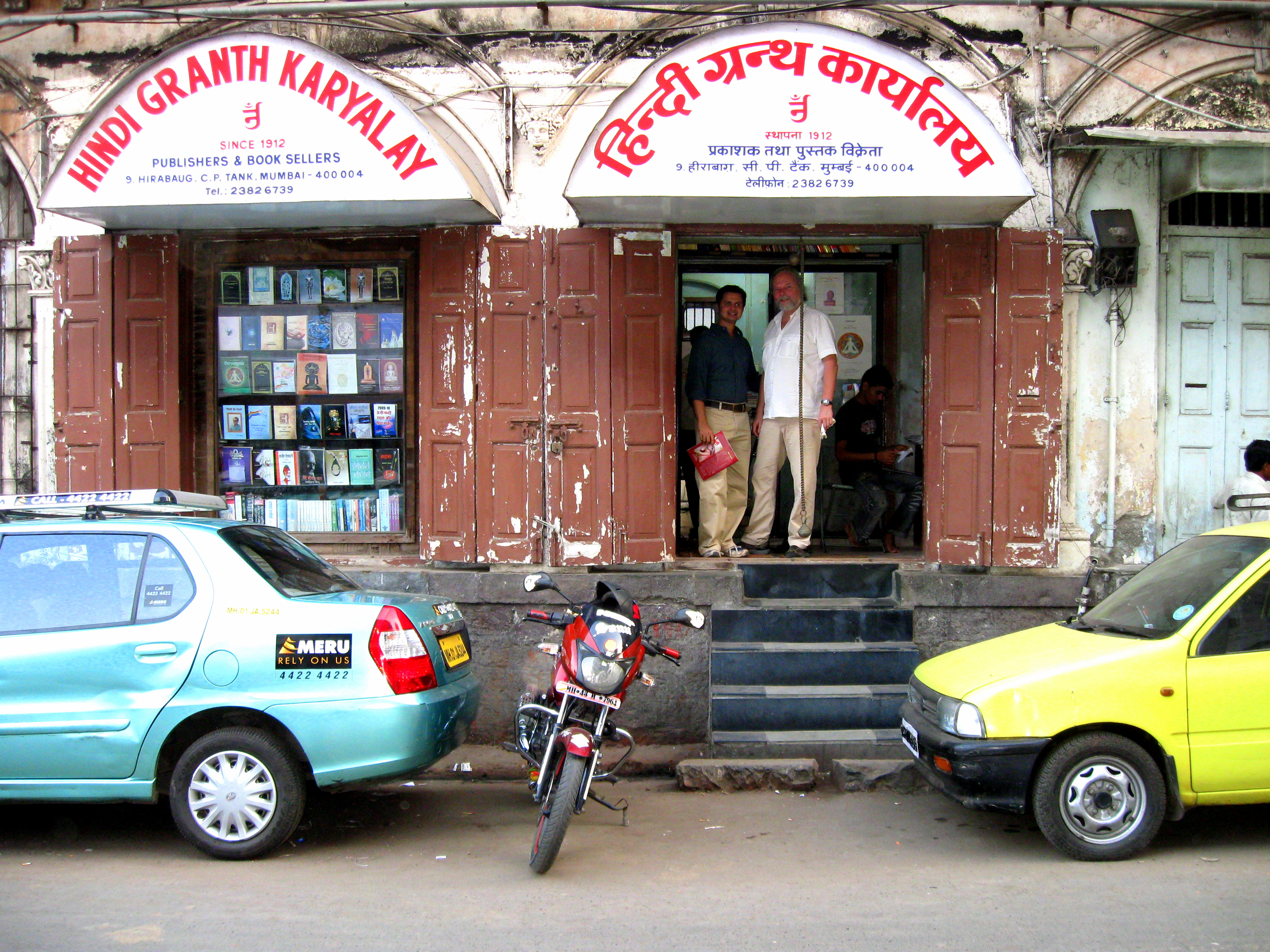
Book shop Hindi Granth Karyalay at Hirabaug, C.P. Tank, Mumbai

Under Premiji’s tutelage, Hindi Granth Ratnākar Kāryālay became India's No. 1 publishers of Hindi literature. In recognition of his contributions to Indian literature, the acclaimed Hindi novelist Vishnu Prabhakar called Premiji the "Bhīsma Pitāmaha" of Hindi publishing. Premiji had suffered from asthma for a long time and died owing to old age on 30 January 1960. He left behind his daughter-in-law and two grandsons. His elder grandson, Yashodhar Modi, continued his legacy till his death in 2014, along with his son, Manish Modi. Now Hindi Granth Karyalay is being managed by Premiji's great grandson Manish Modi. In Premiji's memory, his grandson Yashodhar Modi has started the Pandit Nathuram Premi Research Series. This series has published select volumes focusing on subjects as varied as Jainism, philosophy and yoga and published original texts by ancient and medieval Jain ascetics such as Kundakunda, Samantabhadra, Pūjyapāda, Joindu, Prabhācandra, Vādirāja, Bhāvadeva and many others, usually accompanied by translation in either Hindi or English. Also, highly respected modern scholars such as Premiji himself, Prof. Ludwig Alsdorf, Prof. Maurice Bloomfield, Prof. Willem Bollée and Dr. Jaykumar Jalaj have been and are being published in the Pandit Nathuram Premi Research Series.

== Bookstore ==
Hindi Granth Karyalay's bookstore is located at 9 Hirabaug, C. P. Tank, Mumbai 400004. Besides housing its own published titles, Hindi Granth Karyalay also stocks, sells and distribute Indological literature of thousands of different titles.

== Publications ==
=== Pandit Nathuram Premi Research Series ===
- Jain Studies: Their Present State and Future Tasks

{English}
By Prof Dr Ludwig Alsdorf
English tr. by Bal Patil
Pandit Nathuram Premi Research Series Volume 1
Published in 2006
ISBN 978-81-88769-13-1
In reprint

- The Story of Paesi

Based on the Rayapasenia Kaha
{Prakrit text + English commentary}
English tr. by Prof Dr Willem Bollée
Pandit Nathuram Premi Research Series Volume 2
Published in 2005
ISBN 978-81-88769-03-2
₹ 1200

- Ratnakaranda Shravakacara

{Sanskrit text + Hindi translation}
Sanskrit text by Acarya Samantabhadra
Hindi tr. by Dr Jaykumar Jalaj
Pandit Nathuram Premi Research Series Volume 3
Published in 2006, 2006, 2012
ISBN 978-81-88769-78-0
₹ 50

- Vyavahara Bhashya Pithika

{Prakrit text + English commentary}
English tr. by Prof Dr Willem Bollée
Pandit Nathuram Premi Research Series Volume 4
Published in 2006, 2012
ISBN 978-81-88769-70-4
In reprint

- Samadhitantra

{Sanskrit text + Hindi translation}
Sanskrit text by Acarya Pujyapada
Hindi tr. by Dr Jaykumar Jalaj
Pandit Nathuram Premi Research Series Volume 5
Published in 2006, 2006, 2008, 2016
ISBN 978-81-88769-06-3
₹ 34

- Atthapahuda

{Prakrit text + Hindi translation}
Prakrit text by Acarya Kundakunda
Hindi tr. by Dr Jaykumar Jalaj
Pandit Nathuram Premi Research Series Volume 6
Published in 2006, 2008, 2013
ISBN 978-81-88769-15-5
₹ 125

- Tattvarthasutra

{Sanskrit text + Hindi translation}
Sanskrit text by Acarya Prabhacandra
Hindi tr. by Dr Jaykumar Jalaj
Pandit Nathuram Premi Research Series Volume 7
Published in 2008
ISBN 978-81-88769-16-2
In reprint

- Yogamrit : Yog Sahaj Jivan Vigyan

{Hindi}
By Mahavir Sainik
Pandit Nathuram Premi Research Series Volume 8
Published in 2006
ISBN 978-81-88769-17-9
Out of print

- Paramatmaprakasha

{Apabhramsha text + Hindi translation}
Apabhramsa text by Acarya Joindu
Hindi tr. by Dr Jaykumar Jalaj
Pandit Nathuram Premi Research Series Volume 9
Published in 2007
ISBN 978-81-88769-09-4
In reprint

- Yogasara

{Apabhramsha text + Hindi translation}
Apabhramsa text by Acarya Joindu
Hindi tr. by Dr Jaykumar Jalaj
Pandit Nathuram Premi Research Series Volume 10
Published in 2007, 2009
ISBN 978-81-88769-12-4
₹ 30

- Dhyanastava

{Sanskrit text + Hindi translation}
Sanskrit text by Acarya Bhaskaranandi
Hindi tr. by Dr Jaykumar Jalaj
Pandit Nathuram Premi Research Series Volume 11
Published in 2007
ISBN 978-81-88769-20-9
In reprint

- Dhyanashataka

{Prakrit text + Hindi translation}
Prakrit text by Jinabhadragani Kshamashramana
Hindi tr. by Dr Jaykumar Jalaj
Published in 2007, 2009
Pandit Nathuram Premi Research Series Volume 12
ISBN 978-81-88769-21-6
In reprint

- Barasa Anuvekkha

{Prakrit text + Sanskrit translation + Hindi translation}
Prakrit text by Acarya Kundakunda
Sanskrit tr. & Hindi gloss by Pt. Nathuram Premi
Pandit Nathuram Premi Research Series Volume 13
Published in 2010
ISBN 978-81-88769-22-3
₹ 50

- Ishtopadesha

{Sanskrit text + Hindi translation}
Sanskrit text by Acarya Pujyapada
Hindi tr. by Dr Jaykumar Jalaj
Pandit Nathuram Premi Research Series Volume 14
Published in 2007, 2009, 2013
ISBN 978-81-88769-23-0
In reprint

- Life and Stories of the Jain Saviour Parshvanatha

{English}
An English tr. of Acarya Bhavadeva's Parshvacaritram
by Prof Dr Maurice Bloomfield
Pandit Nathuram Premi Research Series Volume 15
Published in 2008
ISBN 978-81-88769-24-7
In reprint

- Tattvasara

{Prakrit text + English translation}
Prakrit text by Acarya Devasena
English tr. by Manish Modi
Pandit Nathuram Premi Research Series Volume 16
Published in 2013
ISBN 978-81-88769-25-4
In reprint

- The Apabhramsha of Svayambhudeva’s Paumacariu

{English}
By Dr Eva de Clercq
Pandit Nathuram Premi Research Series Volume 17
Published in 2010
ISBN 978-81-88769-28-5
₹ 180

- Jainism and the Definition of Religion

{English}
By Dr Piotr Balcerowicz
Pandit Nathuram Premi Research Series Volume 18
Published in 2009
ISBN 978-81-88769-29-2
₹ 50

- Dravyasamgraha

Compendium of Substances
{Prakrit text + English translation}
Prakrit text by Acarya Nemicandra
English tr. by Prof Dr Nalini Balbir
Pandit Nathuram Premi Research Series Volume 19
Published in 2010, 2013
ISBN 978-81-88769-87-2
₹ 50

- Tattvarthasutra

{Sanskrit text + Hindi & English translations}
Sanskrit text by Acarya Prabhacandra
Hindi tr. by Dr Jaykumar Jalaj, English tr. by Anish Shah
Pandit Nathuram Premi Research Series Volume 20
Published in 2012
ISBN 978-81-88769-31-5
₹ 30

- Rayanasara

{Prakrit text + Hindi translation}
Prakrit text by Acarya Kundakunda
Hindi tr. by Dr Jaykumar Jalaj
Pandit Nathuram Premi Research Series Volume 21
Published in 2011
ISBN 978-81-88769-32-2
₹ 50

- Jainism: An Eternal Pilgrimage

{English}
By Bal Patil
Pandit Nathuram Premi Research Series Volume 23
Published in 2008, 2011
ISBN 978-81-88769-54-4
In reprint

- Dravyasamgraha

{Prakrit text + Hindi translation}
Prakrit text by Acarya Nemicandra
Hindi tr. by Dr Jaykumar Jalaj
Pandit Nathuram Premi Research Series Volume 24
Published in 2009
ISBN 978-81-88769-37-7
₹ 30

- Parshvanathacaritram

Sanskrit text by Acarya Vadiraja
Pandit Nathuram Premi Research Series Volume 25
ISBN 978-81-88769-27-8
In press

- Parshvacaritram: The Life of Parshva

{Sanskrit text + English translation}
Sanskrit text by Acarya Gunabhadra
English tr. by Prof Dr Willem Bollée
Pandit Nathuram Premi Research Series Volume 26
Published in 2008
ISBN 978-81-88769-35-3
₹ 60

- Jain Sahitya aur Itihas

{Hindi}
By Pt. Nathuram Premi
Published in 1942, 1956
ISBN 978-81-88769-02-5
In reprint

- Understanding Jainism

{English}
By Prof Dr Lawrence A. Babb
Pandit Nathuram Premi Research Series Volume 27
Published in 2016
ISBN 978-81-88769-98-8
₹ 250

- Tales of Atonement

Stories from Malayagiri's Commentary on the Vyavahara Bhashya
{Prakrit text + English translation}
English tr. by Prof Dr Willem Bollée
Pandit Nathuram Premi Research Series Volume 28
Published in 2008
ISBN 978-81-88769-38-4
₹ 300

- A Handbook on the Three Jewels of Jainism

THE YOGASHASTRA OF HEMACANDRA
A 12th Century Jain Treatise on Yoga
{Sanskrit text + English translation}
Sanskrit text by Acarya Hemacandra
English tr. by Prof Dr Olle Qvarnström
Pandit Nathuram Premi Research Series Volume 29
Published in 2012, 2012, 2012, 2012, 2013, 2013
ISBN 978-81-88769-94-0
₹ 700

- Samayasara

{Prakrit text + Hindi translation}
Prakrit text by Acarya Kundakunda
Hindi translation by Dr Jaykumar Jalaj
Pandit Nathuram Premi Research Series Volume 30
Published in 2012, 2012
ISBN 978-81-88769-80-3
₹ 80

- Dhyanabattisi

32 Steps to Liberation
{Braj text + English translation}
Braj text by Banarasidas
English tr. by Jerome Petit
Pandit Nathuram Premi Research Series Volume 31
Published in 2010
ISBN 978-81-88769-48-3
In reprint

- Tattvarthasutra

Aspects of Reality in Jainism, through the Eyes of a Scientist
{Sanskrit text + English translation & gloss}
Sanskrit text by Acarya Umasvati
English tr. and commentary by Dr Duli Chandra Jain
Preface by Prof Padmanabh S. Jaini
Pandit Nathuram Premi Research Series Volume 32
Published in 2012, 2013
ISBN 978-81-88769-50-6
₹ 600

- Svarupa-Sambodhana

Right Instruction on the Nature of the Soul
{Sanskrit text + English translation & gloss}
Sanskrit text by Acarya Akalanka
English tr., notes and introduction by Nagin J. Shah
Pandit Nathuram Premi Research Series Volume 33
Published in 2011
ISBN 978-81-88769-51-3
₹ 50

- Tattvajnana Dvatrimshika

{Sanskrit text + English translation}
Sanskrit text by Acarya Siddhasena Divakara
English tr. by Manish Modi
Pandit Nathuram Premi Research Series Volume 34
Published in 2013
ISBN 978-81-88769-95-7
₹ 20

- Three Prakrit Grammars

{Sanskrit text + English translation & gloss}
By Saartje Verbeke
Pandit Nathuram Premi Research Series Volume 35
Published in 2010
ISBN 978-81-88769-55-1
₹ 300

- Ishtopadesha

Beneficial Teachings
{Sanskrit text + Gujarati tr. + English translation}
Sanskrit text by Acarya Pujyapada
Gujarati tr. by Pravina Mehta, English tr. by Manish Modi
Pandit Nathuram Premi Research Series Volume 36
Published in 2010, 2013
ISBN 978-81-88769-93-3
₹ 20

- Bhaktamara Stotra

{Sanskrit text + Hindi translation & gloss + English translation}
Sanskrit text by Acarya Manatunga
Hindi poetic tr. and gloss by Pt Nathuram Premi, English tr. by Manish Modi
Pandit Nathuram Premi Research Series Volume 37
Published in 2012, 2013
ISBN 978-81-88769-92-6
In reprint

- Mrityu Mahotsava

A Celebration of Death
{Sanskrit text + Hindi, Gujarati & English translations}
Sanskrit text by an Unknown Writer
Hindi tr. by Shreyans Sukhani, Gujarati tr. by Dr Shilpa Vasani,
English tr. by Manish Modi
Pandit Nathuram Premi Research Series Volume 38
Published in 2010
ISBN 978-81-88769-58-2
In reprint

- Chhahdhala

By Pandit Daulatram
Original text in Braj + Hindi translation
Hindi prose and poetic translations by Dr Jaykumar Jalaj
Pandit Nathuram Premi Research Series Volume 39
Published in 2014, 2014
ISBN 978-81-88769-62-9
₹ 100

- Hridaya Pradipa

Verses to Illumine Your Heart
{Sanskrit text + English translation}
Sanskrit text by an Unknown Writer
English tr. by Manish Modi
Pandit Nathuram Premi Research Series Volume 40
Published in 2013
ISBN 978-81-88769-82-7
In reprint

- Ratnakarandaka Shravakacara

{Sanskrit text + English translation}
Sanskrit text by Acarya Samantabhadra
English tr. and commentary by Prof Dr Willem Bollée
Pandit Nathuram Premi Research Series Volume 41
Published in 2012, 2012
ISBN 978-81-88769-66-7
In reprint

- Kalyanamandira Stotra

{Sanskrit text + Hindi translation + English translation}
Sanskrit text by Acarya Kumudacandra
Hindi poetic tr. and gloss by Pt Shobhachandra Bharill, English tr. by Manish Modi
Pandit Nathuram Premi Research Series Volume 42
Published in 2013
ISBN 978-81-88769-88-9
In reprint

- Sadbodha-Candrodaya

{Sanskrit text + English translation}
Sanskrit text by Acarya Padmanandi
English tr. by Manish Modi
Pandit Nathuram Premi Research Series Volume 43
Published in 2014
ISBN 978-81-88769-52-0
₹ 25

=== Other books that we have published ===
- International Journal of Jain Studies, Volume 1 - 3

{English}
ISBN 978-81-88769-36-0
In reprint

- International Journal of Jain Studies, Volume 4 - 6

{English}
Published in 2011
ISBN 978-81-88769-67-4
₹ 800

- International Journal of Jain Studies, Volume 7 - 9

{English}
Published in 2014
ISBN 978-81-88769-98-8
₹ 700

- Christianity and Jainism

An Interfaith Dialogue
{English}
By Prof Padmanabh S. Jaini
Published in 2009
ISBN 978-81-88769-42-1
₹ 30

- Bhagavan Mahavir ka Buniyadi Chintan

{Hindi}
By Dr Jaykumar Jalaj
Published in 2017 (46th edition)
ISBN 978-81-88769-84-1
₹ 34

- The Basic Thought of Bhagavan Mahavir

{English}
By Dr Jaykumar Jalaj
English tr. by Manish Modi
Published in 2017 (14th edition)
ISBN 978-81-88769-99-5
₹ 34

- Bhagavan Mahavir nu Buniyadi Chintan

{Gujarati}
By Dr Jaykumar Jalaj
Gujarati tr. by Prof. Bhagavati Prasad Upadhyay
Published in 2010
ISBN 978-81-88769-53-7
In reprint

- Rebirth of the Karma Doctrine

{English}
By Prof Dr Subhash Jain
Published in 2010
ISBN 978-81-88769-44-5
₹ 125

- Unlimited Horizons

{English}
By Hermann Kuhn
Published in 2010
ISBN 978-81-88769-49-0
₹ 285

-----

- Dilon ke Rishte

{Hindi}
By Prem Dhavan
Published in 2001
ISBN 978-81-88769-00-1
₹ 100

- Religious Ethics: A Sourcebook

{English}
By Prof Dr Arthur Dobrin
Published in 2004
ISBN 978-81-88769-01-8
In reprint

- The Lost Art of Happiness

{English}
By Prof Dr Arthur Dobrin
Published in 2007, 2009
ISBN 978-81-88769-11-7
₹ 250

- Business Ethics: The Right Way to Riches

{English}
By Prof Dr Arthur Dobrin
Published in 2006, 2008, 2009
ISBN 978-81-88769-26-1
In reprint

- Spelling God with Two O's

{English}
By Prof Dr Arthur Dobrin
Published in 2009
ISBN 978-81-88769-39-1
In reprint
