= Mohan =

Mohan may refer to:

== People ==
- Mohan (name), a name generally found among Hindus
- Mohan (clan), a clan of the Mohyal caste in India
- Mohan (actor) (born 1956), Indian film actor
- Mohan (director), Indian director of Malayalam films
- Michael Mohan, American film director
- Mohan Shankar, Indian film actor
- Mohan Shumsher JBR, Former prime minister of Nepal

== Places ==
=== Inhabited places ===
- Mohan, Uttar Pradesh, town and nagar panchayat Uttar Pradesh, India
  - Mohan (Vidhan Sabha constituency)
- Mohan, Yunnan, a town in China
- Ambheta Mohan, a village in Uttar Pradesh, India
- Braja Mohan, a village in the Barisal Division, Bangladesh
- Mohan Majra, a village in Punjab, India

=== Other places ===
- Mohan Pass, Siwalik Hills in Sikkim
- Mohan Nagar metro station, Delhi Metro
- Mohan Estate metro station, Delhi Metro

== Other uses ==
- Melaleuca viminea, a shrub or tree from Western Australia with the common name Mohan
- Mohan (1947 film), a 1947 Indian Hindi film directed by Anadinath Bannerjee
- Mohan (legendary), a name applied to several supernatural creatures in Latin American folklore
- Mohan convention, a convention in the game of bridge
- Mohan Meakin Brewery, a large group of companies started with Asia's first brewery, incorporated in 1855
- Mohan veena, two distinct Indian classical instruments
- Pyare Mohan, a 2006 Indian Hindi film
- Mohan, another name for Krishna, a major Hindu deity

== See also ==
- Mohana (disambiguation)
- Mohini (disambiguation)
- Mahan (disambiguation)
