= Mohan (name) =

Mohan is a given name and surname. Notable people with this name include:

== Sole name ==
- Mohan, another name for Krishna, a major Hindu deity
- Mohan (actor) (born 1956), Kollywood film actor
- Mohan (director), Indian director of Malayalam films
- Mohanlal (born 1960), South Indian film actor
- Crazy Mohan (1952–2019), Tamil comedy actor, script writer and playwright

== Given name ==
- Mohan Agashe (born 1947), Indian actor
- Mohan Babu (born 1950), born Manchu Bakthavatsalam Naidu, actor, producer, politician from Andhra Pradesh
- Mohan Baidya, chairman of the Communist Party of Nepal Revolutionary Maoist
- Mohan Bam (born 1991), Nepalese judoka
- Mohan Bhagwat (born 1950), Indian veterinary doctor and the current Sarsanghachalak of Rashtriya Swayamsevak Sangh
- Mohan Bhandari (1937–2015), Indian film and television actor
- Mohan Chand Sharma (1965–2008), Indian Police Inspector who served in the Delhi Police, Special Cell
- Mohan Choti (1939–1992), Indian film actor
- Mohan Das, more commonly known as Lotan Baba (or "rolling saint"), an Indian holy man promoting peace by rolling his body along the ground when he travels
- Mohan Dharia (1925–2013), Indian lawyer, Union minister, and social worker
- Mohan Ellawala (1948–2009), governor of Sabaragamuwa Province in Sri Lanka from October 2, 2008 up until his death in 2009
- Mohan al-Furayji, Iraqi Army general who planned the 2008 operation against militias in Basra
- Mohan Galot (born 1945), Kenyan businessman
- Mohandas Karamchand Gandhi (1869–1948), better known as Mahatma Gandhi, Indian revolutionary, President of the Indian National Congress
- Mohan Gokhale (1954–1999), Indian film, television and theater actor who has worked in art films such as Sparsh, Bhavni Bhavai and Mirch Masala
- Mohan Krishna Indraganti, Telugu film director from India
- Mohan Jena (born 1957), member of the 14th Lok Sabha of India representing the Jajpur constituency of Orissa, and a member of the Biju Janata Dal political party
- Mohan Joshi (born 1945), Indian actor
- Mohan Kanda (born 1945), Indian Administrative Service officer and a member of the National Disaster Management Authority
- Mohan Kapoor (born 1965), Indian actor
- G. Mohan Kumar (born 1955), Indian Administrative Service and former Defence Secretary and Defence Production Secretary of India
- Mohan Kumar (director) (1934–2017), Indian film director
- Mohan Kumar (serial killer) (born 1963), Indian killer called "Cyanide Mohan"
- Mohan Kumaramangalam (1916–1973), Indian politician and communist theorist who was a member of the Indian National Congress, and later, the Communist Party of India
- Mohan Lal Grero, Sri Lankan educationist and politician, currently a member of the Provincial Councillor of the Western Province
- Mohan Lal Jhikram (1919–2010), leader of Indian National Congress from Madhya Pradesh, India
- Mohan Lal Kashmiri (1812–1877), Indian spy, diplomat, and author
- Mohan Lal Sukhadia (1916–1982), Indian political and social leader, Chief Minister of Rajasthan 1954–1971
- Mohan Maharishi, Indian theatre director, actor and a playwright
- Mohan Munasinghe, Sri Lankan physicist
- Mohan Patel (born 1952), field hockey player from New Zealand, member of the team that won the gold medal at the 1976 Summer Olympics in Montreal
- Mohan Kumar Raja (born 1996), Indian sprinter
- Mohan Rakesh (1925–1972), major figure of 20th-century Hindi literature
- Mohan Rawale (born 1948), member of the 14th Lok Sabha of India representing the Mumbai South Central constituency of Maharashtra and a member of the Shiv Sena (SS) political party
- Ram Mohan Roy (1774–1833), founder of Brahmo Samaj, a 19th-century spiritual and religious reformation
- Mohan Sharma, Indian film actor in Malayalam films of Chattakari fame
- Manmohan Singh (born 1932), Prime minister of India
- Mohan Singh (general) (1909–1989), Indian military officer and member of the Indian Independence Movement
- Mohan Singh (1945–2013), Indian politician, former general secretary of the Samajwadi Party
- Mohan Bikram Singh (born 1935), often referred to as MBS, party name Gharti, a Nepalese politician
- Mohan Singh Kohli (born 1931), Indian mountaineer
- Mohan Sinha Mehta (1895–1986), founder of Vidya Bhavan group of institutions and Sewa Mandir in Udaipur in Rajasthan
- Mohan Singh Oberoi (1898–2002), Indian hotelier, founder and chairman of Oberoi Hotels & Resorts
- Mohan Sithara (born 1959), Malayalam film music composer in Kerala
- Mohan Sivanand (born 1951), Indian journalist and artist
- Mohan Upreti (1925–1997), Indian theatre director, playwright and a music composer, considered one of the pioneers in Indian theatre music

== Surname ==
- A. G. Mohan (born 1945), Indian yoga teacher, yoga therapist and author
- Ananthula Madan Mohan (1931–2004), Indian politician
- Balaji Mohan (born 1987), Indian film director
- C. Mohan (born 1955), American computer scientist and IBM Fellow
- Chander Mohan, former Deputy Chief Minister of Haryana State in India
- Chander Mohan (journalist) (born 1946), Indian journalist
- Chandra Mohan (disambiguation), several people
- Chinta Mohan (born 1954), member of the 14th Lok Sabha of India representing the Tirupathi constituency of Andhra Pradesh, and a member of the Indian National Congress
- Dominic Mohan (born 1969), British journalist originally from Bristol, England
- Duvvasi Mohan, Telugu comedian
- Earl Mohan (1889–1928), American film actor of the silent era who appeared in 50 films between 1915 and 1927
- John Mohan (born 1939), American bridge player
- Keith Mohan (born 1935), English cricketer who played for Derbyshire in the County Championship in 1957 and 1958
- Kim Mohan (born 1949), American author and editor
- Mac Mohan (1938–2010), Indian character actor in Hindi language films
- Madan Mohan (disambiguation), several people
- Manjima Mohan (born 1993), Indian film actress
- Monica Mohan, American artist
- Mukti Mohan, Indian actress and dancer
- Murali Mohan (born 1940), South Indian film actor, producer and politician
- N. M. Mohan (1949–2012), Indian comics writer
- Narendra Mohan (1934–2002), Indian industrialist, chairman and managing director of Jagran Prakashan, publisher of Dainik Jagran
- Neal Mohan, CEO of YouTube since February 2023
- Neeti Mohan, Indian singer
- Nicky Mohan (born 1970), English former professional footballer who played in defence
- Pantam Gandhi Mohan, Indian politician
- Radha Mohan (born 1965), Tamil movie director
- Raja Mohan, Indian academic, journalist and foreign policy analyst
- Rakesh Mohan (born 1948), Indian economist and former Deputy Governor of Reserve Bank of India
- Ram Mohan (born 1931), veteran in the Indian animation industry
- Saira Mohan (born 1978), fashion model of Indian, Irish and French heritage
- Saranya Mohan (born 1989), Indian film actress who has acted in Malayalam and Tamil films such as Yaaradi Nee Mohini and Vennila Kabadi Kuzhu
- Shakti Mohan, Indian dancer and choreographer
- Shweta Mohan (born 1985), Indian playback singer who has sung in Malayalam, Tamil, Telugu and Kannada languages, daughter of Sujatha Mohan
- Sujatha Mohan (born 1964), Indian playback singer who has sung in Malayalam, Tamil, Telugu, and Hindi movies
- Swati Mohan, Indian-American aerospace engineer
- Vinu Mohan (born 1985), Indian actor in Malayalam cinema, son of actress Sobha Mohan

== Fictional characters ==
- Samira Mohan, fictional doctor in the American medical drama TV series The Pitt
