= Tilfara Ainabad =

Village in Uttar Pradesh, India

Tilfara Ainabad is a village situated in the Nanauta Mandal of Saharanpur District in Uttar Pradesh, India. Tilfara Ainabad is located 10.80 kilometres from the Mandal headquarters in Nanauta, 133 km distance from the national capital Delhi and is 458 km distance from the state capital Lucknow. Villages nearby include Jaroda Panda (5 km), Ambehta Mohan (4.4 km).

Tilfara Ainabad is a village panchayat located in the Saharanpur district of Uttar-Pradesh state, India. The latitude 29.58 and longitude 77.23 are the geocoordinate of the Tilfara Ainabad.

The surrounding nearby villages from Tilfara Ainabad are Nanauta, Nanhera Khurd Must., Ambehta Mohan, Mushkipur, Lukadari, Bhavasi Raipur, Uumri Majbata, Bhanhera Khemchand, Chaura, Balu Mazra, Baduli Navagaon, Shimlana Mu., Dadanpur, Thaska, Khudabaxpur, Nanauta Dehat, Kachrai, Sadhauli Dunichandpur, Dalheri, Khudana, Tikraul, Aulra, Babupura, Sizood, Indravali Kalyanpur, Chhachharauli, Bhatpura, Janderi, Bhojpur, Kanshipur, Sisauni, Chirao, Bharidin Daranpur, Mora, Anant Mao, Bahera Mu., Bud Gaon, Landhaura, Pando Kheri, Jhabiran, Abha, Bhains Rao, Chandpur Mazbatta, Jadauda Panda, Kanjoli, Kuwa Khera, Madhopur, Maheshpur Mu., Sabbipur.

Barag is a famous building in Tilfara Ainabad. Its name derives from the word barrack, used in British time. There is a Prachin Shiv Mandir temple is famous for its idols and its architecture. It is known as wish fulfillment temple. Unique fact of this village is it has numerous ponds. It also have people from all the castes but Thakur's and Pandit's are more dominated.
