= Montfort School, Yercaud =

Montfort Higher Secondary School
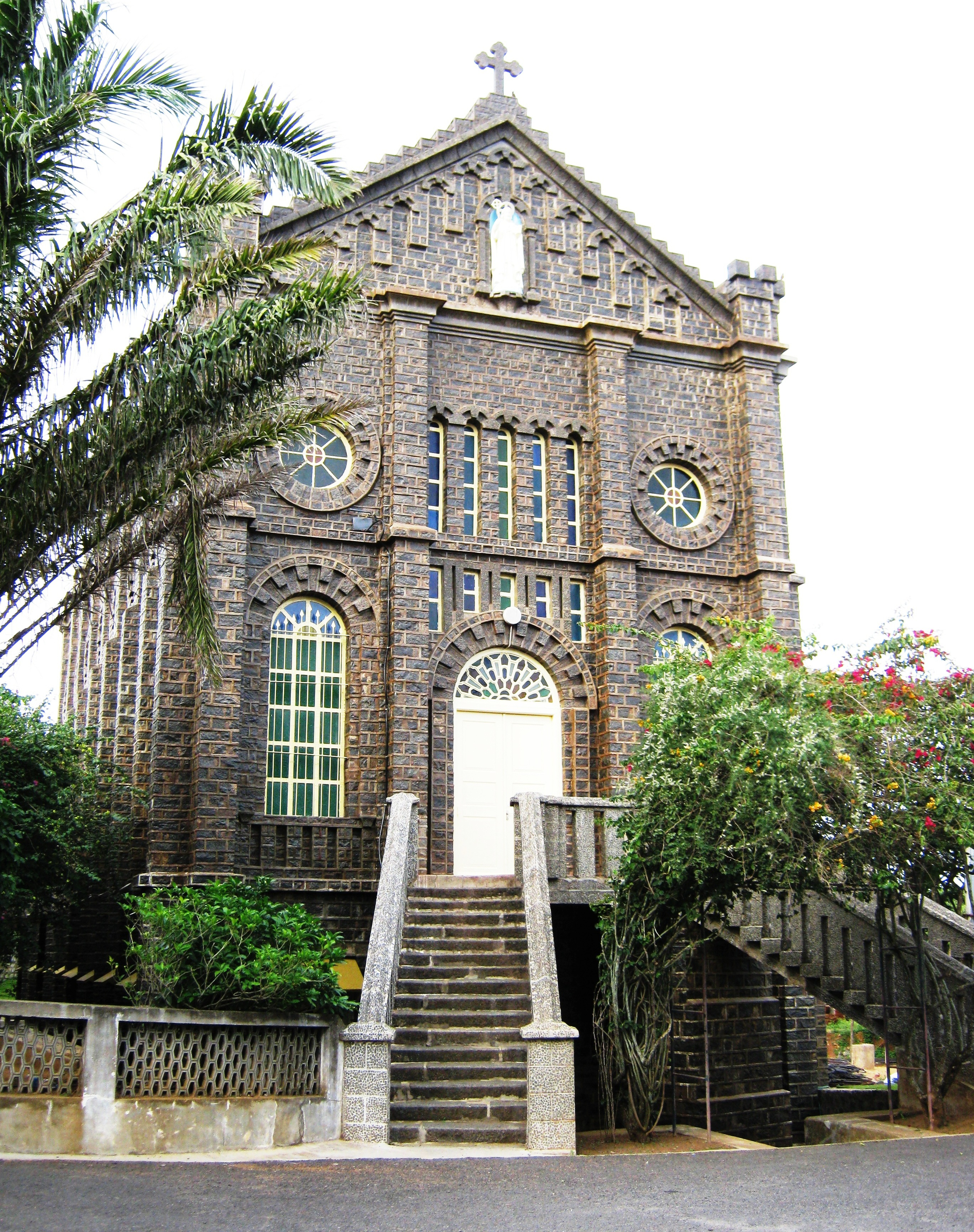
- Montfort School Church

Location
- Yercaud; Salem 636601; India
- 11.771726°N 78.209642°E

Information
- Type: Government-aided
- Motto: Virtue and Labour
- Patron saint: St. Louis Grignion de Montfort
- Established: 1917
- Founder: Rev. Bro. Eugene Mary
- Session: Single
- Principal: Rev. Bro. Sahayam
- Staff: 25
- Faculty: 35
- Colours: Blue and Gold
- Website: http://www.montfortyercaud.com/

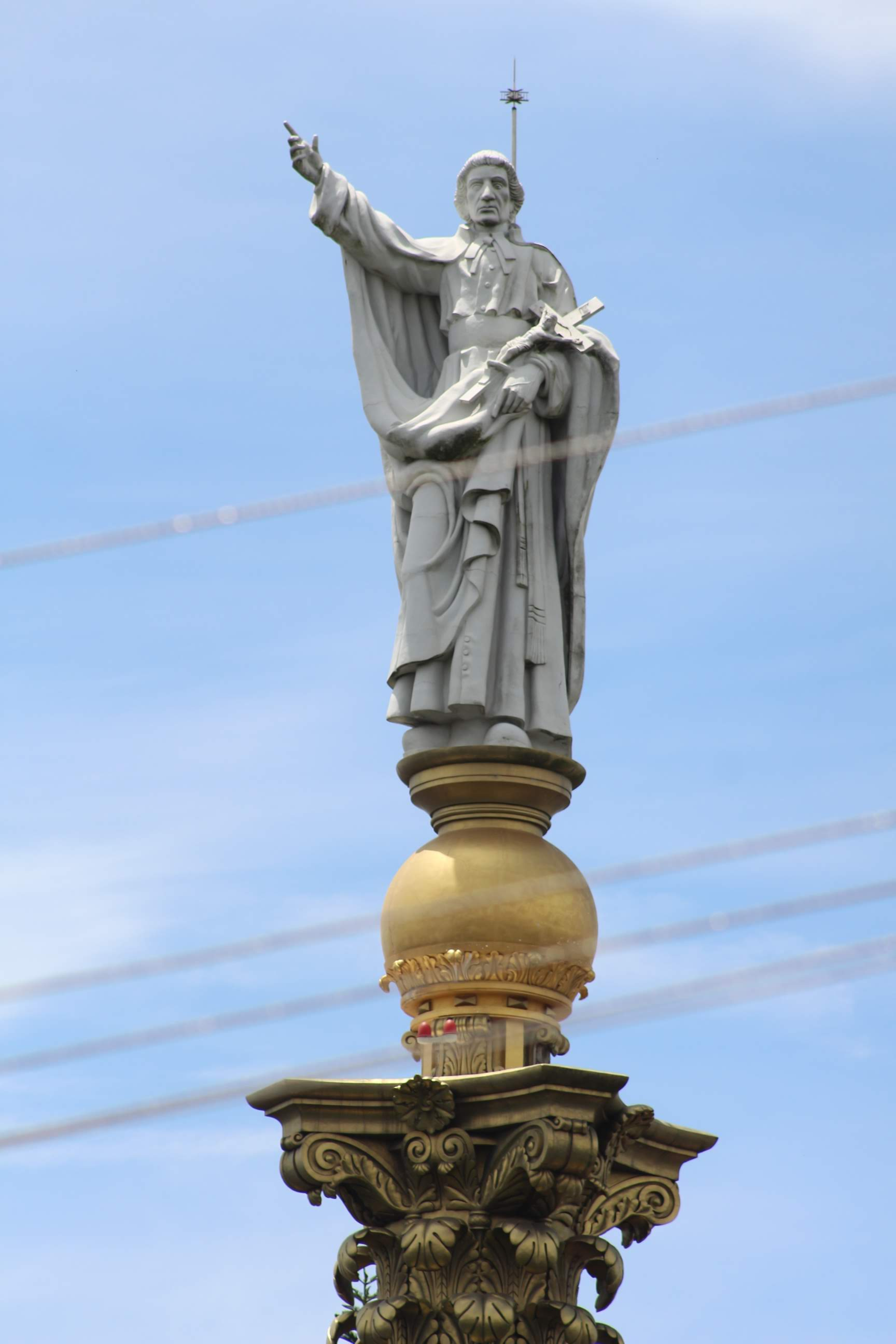
Montfort School statue

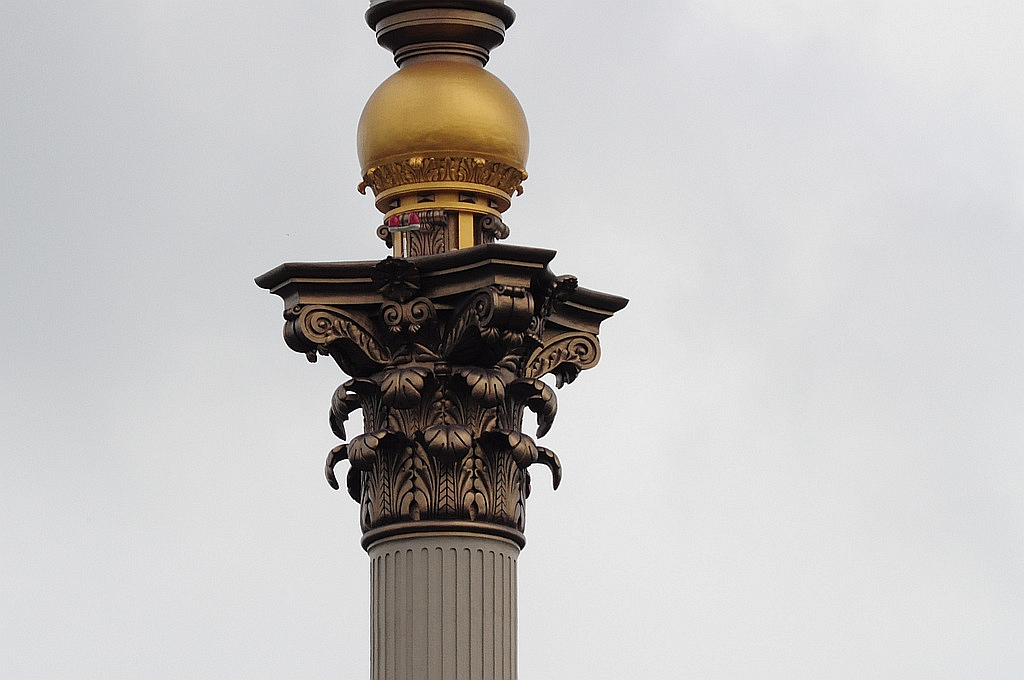
Montfort School statue base

Montfort School, Yercaud is a co-ed secondary school run by the Montfort Brothers of St. Gabriel in the town of Yercaud, near Salem in Tamil Nadu, India. The school motto is Virtus Et Labor, which translates to "Virtue and Labor". The colours are Blue and Gold.

== Notable alumni ==
- Mohan Sivanand – Editor-in-Chief, Reader's Digest India
- Anbumani Ramadoss- Former Union Cabinet Minister for Health and Family Welfare
- Shashi Tharoor- former Minister of State for Foreign Affairs; former UN Under-Secretary General for Communications and Public Information and author
- John Victor Kennedy (Chiyaan Vikram) – Actor
- Roger Binny – All rounder in the World Cup winning Indian cricket team of 1983
- Nagesh Kukunoor, film-maker
- Jose K. Mani, politician
- Shanawas, Actor
- Jakes Bejoy, Musician

Iniya rajakumar - singer , actress
