= Ganeshprasad Varni =

Kshullak Ganeshprasad Varni
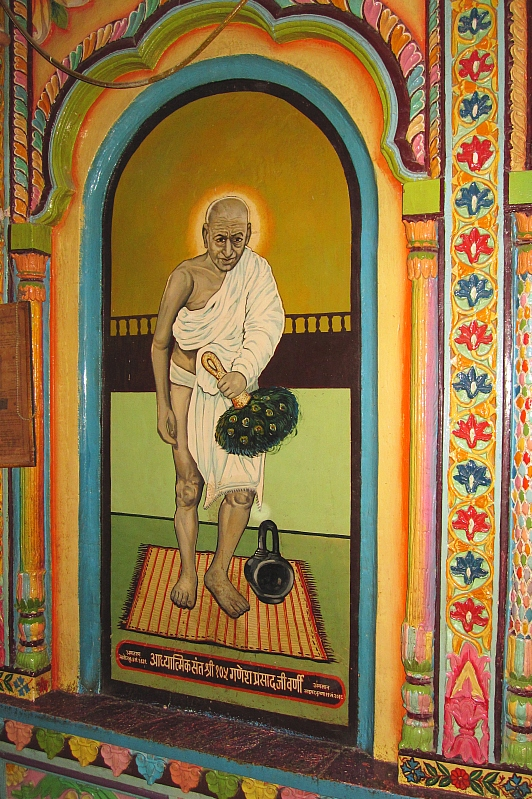

Personal life
- Born: 29 September 1874 Hansera, Lalitpur, U.P.
- Died: 5 September 1961 (aged 87) Isri, Jharkhand
- Notable work(s): Meri Jivan Gatha (1945), Jain philosophy based on Acharya Kundakunda's Samayasar

Religious life
- Religion: Jainism

Religious career
- Teacher: Shiksha-Guru Gopaldas Bariaya, Ambadas Shahsti

Military service
- Rank: Kshullak

Kshullak Ganeshprasad Varni (Hindi:पूज्य 105 श्री गणेश प्रसाद वर्णी, Gujarati: શ્રી ૧૦૫ ક્ષુલ્લક ગણેશપ્રસાદ વર્ણી Kannada:ಶ್ರೀ ೧೦೫ ಕ್ಷುಲ್ಲಕ ಗಣೆಶಪ್ರಸಾದ ವರ್ಣೀ; 29 September 1874 – 5 September 1961) was one of the foundational figures of the modern Indian Digambara intellectual tradition during the early 20th century. He was the founder of several schools and institutions of advanced learning including Syadvad Mahavidyalaya at Varanasi in 1905, Varanasi and Satark-Sudhataringini Digamber Jain Pathshala, now Ganesh Digamber Jain Sanskrit Vidyalaya at Sagar.

Many of the Jain scholars today are products of the institutions found by Ganeshprasad Varni. Sahajananda Varni was one of his disciples. While Jinendra Varni never heard him speaking, he was deeply influenced by him and had compiled a volume "Varni Darshan" to commemorate Ganeshprasad Varni's birth centenary in 1975.

== Early life ==
Ganesh Prasad Ji Varni was born to Hira Lal and Ujyari Devi in village Hansera in district Lalitpur (U.P.), who belonged to the Asati community. While the Asatis are mostly Vaishnava, his father had a deep faith in the Namokar Mantra. He used to live in a Jain neighbourhood and visit the Jain temple near his house in Mandawara. Influenced by lectures there, at the age of ten, he took a vow to take meals before sunset throughout his life. During his yajnopavita ceremony, he had an argument with the priest and his mother, and declared that he will be a Jain henceforth. He passed the middle examination at the age of fifteen years. He did not have any aptitude for shop-keeping, his father's profession, and became a school teacher.

He came into contact with a religious minded lady Chironjabai mata ji of Simra khurd (m.p.) through Karorelal Bhaiji, a spiritual man of Jatara. She developed much affection for him and treated him like her son. She supported his desire of obtaining advanced religious education spiritual development.

== Education ==
At that time there were no advanced scholars in the Bundelkhand region. He studied at Jaipur, Khurja, Bombay, Mathura, Varanasi and other places with great difficulty. Because of his lack of funds, he occasionally had to starve accept humiliations. he studied with Pt. Panna Lal Backliwal and Baba Gurdayal at Bombay to pass Ratnakarand Shravakachar and Katantra-panchsanndhiki examinations. There he also met Pt. Gopaldas Baraiya, with whom he studied Nyayadipika and Sarvarthsidhi after he had studied of Nyaya (logic) and grammar at Khurja. He was sometimes turned down by reputed Brahmin teachers. He studied under Pt. Ambadas Shastri at Varanasi. He then studied at Chakauti and Navadweep to acquire the Nyayacharya degree.

== Establishment of Educational Institutions ==
Based on his experience of encountering the difficulties in obtaining advanced Jain education, he strongly felt the need for establishing Jain educational institution at Varanasi. He received a donation of one rupee from someone. He used it to by sixty-four postcards, and sent them to some potential Jain donors. With the assistance of prominent Jain philanthropists like Babu Devkumar of Arrah, Seth Manek Chand, J.P. of Bombay etc. he established the famous Syadwad Mahavidyalaya at Varanasi in 1905. Baba Bhagirath Varni served as the superintendent (supervisor) of the institution. Even though Ganeshprasad was a founder of the Syadvad Mahavidyalaya, he accepted the rules imposed by Bhagirath Varni. A number of influential Jain scholars have been a product of this institution. With the help of Pt. Motilal Nehru, he was able to get Jain studies introduced at Banaras Hindu University.

Later, with encouragement of Balchand Savalnavis, and the support of Kandya, Malaiya, and other families and Singhai Kundanlal etc. he helped establish the Satark-Sudhataringini Jain Pathshala which is now the well known Ganesh Digamber Jain Sanskrit Vidyalaya at Sagar.

He also helped in establishing various institutions. After inspiring and helping establish these institutions, he left the administration to local volunteers, without bothering to remain in control, and moved on. Some of these institutions are:

- Swadvada Mahavidyalaya Banares, 1905.
- Ganesh Digamber Jain Sanskrit Vidyalaya (Satark-Sudhataringini), 1911.
- Sri Kund Kund Jain (P-G) College, Khatauli, 1926.
- Jain Higher Secondary School Sagar.
- Mahavira Jain Sanskrit Uchchatar Madhamik Vidyalaya, Lalitpur, 1917.
- Varni Jain Inter College, Lalitpur.
- Shri Ganesh Prasad Varni Snatak Mahavidyalaya, Ghuwara.
- Varni Jain Gurugul, Jabalpur.
- Shri Parshwanath Brahmacharya Ashram Jain Gurukul, Khurai, 1944.
- Pathshalas at Baruasagar, Dronagiri.
- Digambar Jain mahila Ashram, Sagar
- Digambar Jain Udasin Ashram, Isri,

As a result of the establishment of these institutions, the Bundelkhand started producing highly regarded Jain scholars such that Bundelkhand is now regarded to be a bastion of Jain learning.

== Spiritual Passage ==
He led a simple and aesthetic life and dedicated himself to the study and teaching of Jain philosophy. He gradually adopted a life of renunciation. At Kundalpur, he took the brahmacharya vrata (celibacy), i.e. 7th pratima from Baba Gokuldas and thus came to be called a Varni in 1913. In 1936, he gave up travelling by buses or trains. He took 10th pratima in 1944, and became a kshullak in 1947. He travelled extensively in India. He had donated his only wearing apparel, the Chadar, at a public meeting held in connection with Azad Hind Army at Jabalpur in 1945. It was immediately auctioned for Rs. 3000/- for raising the funds for the army.

At the age of 87, sensing his impending end, he retired to Isri Udasin Ashram, near Sammet Shikhar which he had himself helped establish. He took the vows of a Jain Muni with the name Muni 108 Ganeshkirti. He died in his final meditation (Samadhi-maran) on 5 December 1961.

== Works ==
His two-volume autobiography Meri Jevan Gatha has become a major source of information about the Jain society of his time. It is written in a fluid and very readable style. The recordings of his lectures on the Samayasar have been re-discovered and digitised. They have also been published as a book. A publishing house named Shri Ganeshprasad Varni Jain Granthmala, Varanasi, named after him has published a number of important Jain texts.

== See also ==
- Niraj Jain
- Pandit Pannalal Jain, Sahityacharya
- Phoolchandra Shastri
