= Mehan (surname) =

Mehan is a surname. Notable people with the surname include:

- Charles Mehan (1896–1972), American rugby union player
- David Mehan, Australian politician
- Hande Mehan (born 1995), Turkish musician and songwriter

== See also ==
- Mahan (name)
