= Chandra Mohan =

Chandra Mohan or Chandramohan may refer to:

- Chandra Mohan (Hindi actor) (1905–1949), Hindi actor
- Chandra Mohan (Telugu actor) (born 1947), Telugu actor
- Chandra Mohan Patowary (born 1955), Indian politician from Assam
- P. Chandra Mohan, chairman
- R. G. Chandramogan, Tamil entrepreneur, founder of Hudson Agro products
- Srilamanthula Chandramohan (born 1981), Indian in artwork controversy
