= Phoolchandra Shastri =

Indian jain scholar (1901–1991)

Siddhantacharya Pandit Phoolchandra Shastri
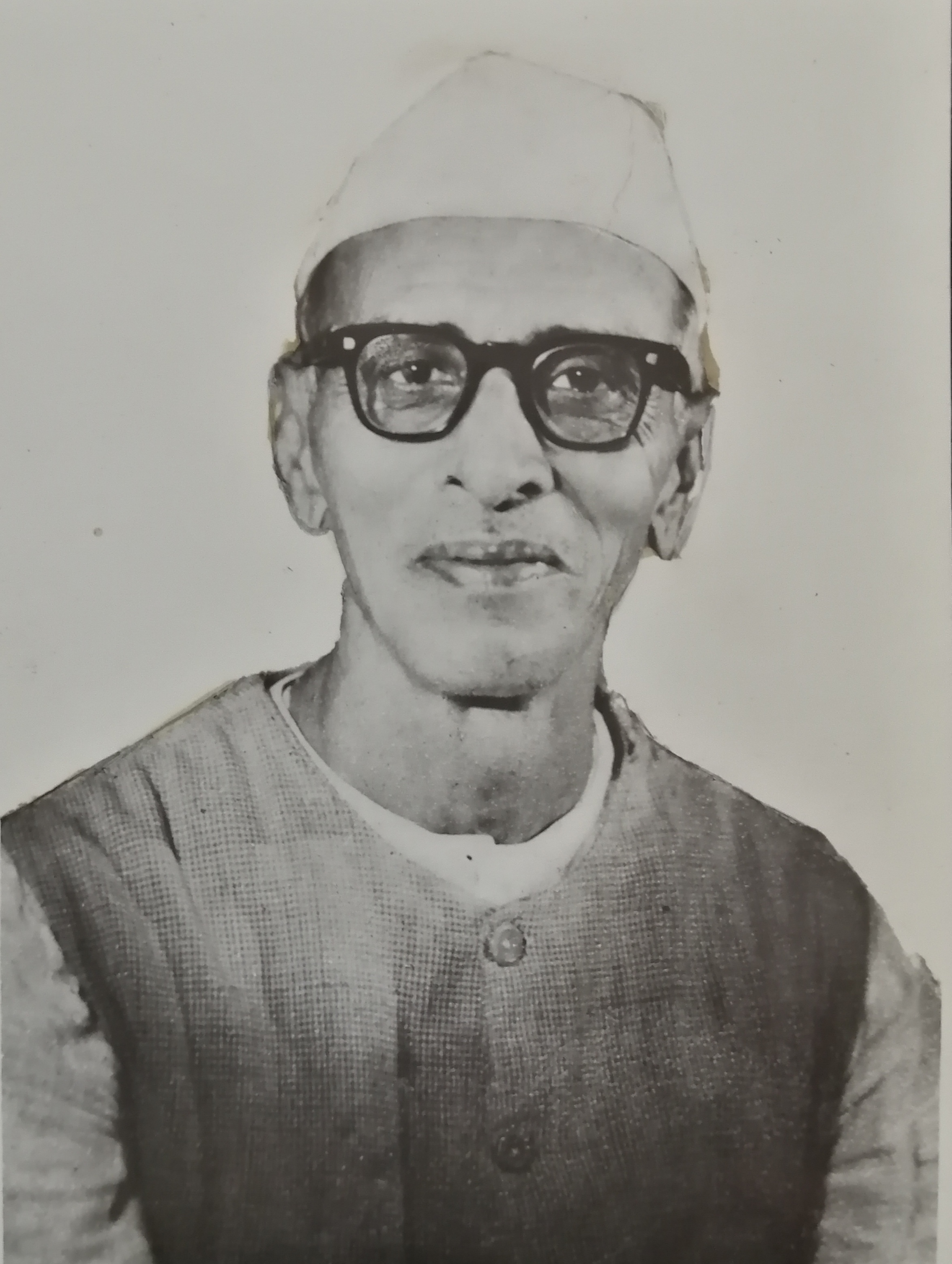
- Pandit Phoolchandra Shastri in 70s
- Born: 11 April 1901; Silawan, North-Western Provinces, British India
- Died: 31 August 1991 (aged 90); Roorkee, Uttar Pradesh (now in Uttarakhand), India
- Occupation: Author
- Writing career
- Language: Sanskrit, Prakrit, Hindi, Bundelkhandi, Apabramsha
- Subject: Jainism
- Notable works: Satkhandagama, Kasayapahuda, Varna, Jati aur Dharma, Jain Tattvamimansa
- Notable awards: Awarded the title of Siddhantacharya

Siddhantacharya Pandit Phoolchandra Shastri (11 April 1901 – 31 August 1991) was a Jain scholar, writer, editor, freedom fighter, social reformer and an intellectual giant in the field of Jainism. He is best known for dedicating a major part of his life in translating to Hindi the foremost and the oldest Digambara Jain Canon, Shatkhandāgama and Kasayapahuda, and its commentaries, Dhavala, Maha-Dhavala and Jai-Dhavala. He was also an active member of the Indian National Congress during the Indian struggle for freedom. Panditji was a strong advocate and proponent of abolishing many evils within the Jain community and was the founding member of many institutes of learning and scholarship. As a recognition of his contribution to Jain philosophy, he was conferred a title of "Siddhantacharya" at Jain Siddhant Bhavan, Ara (Bihar) in 1962 by the Governor of Bihar Ananthasayanam Ayyangar.

== Early life ==
Panditji was born in the village of Silawan, District Lalitpur which is part of Bundelkhand in the state of Uttar Pradesh on 11 April 1901. Singhai Daryavlal Jain and his wife Jankibai were his parents. He completed his studies in 1920 from Shri Mahavir Digambar Jain Pathshala in Sadhumal, Lalitpur. Despite financial constraints, Panditji ensured that he completed his education. He was motivated and financially helped by Sheth Laxmichand Jain (1856–1920) a zamindar and businessman of Lalitpur. He did his graduation from Shri Gopal Digambara Jain Sanskrit Vidyalaya, Morena in 1922. He got married in 1923 at the age of 22 years. He migrated from Silawan to Bina and from there he migrated and settled in Varanasi. He lectured in Jain Philosophy at Banaras Hindu University and Syadvad Digamabara Jain Mahavidyalaya, Varanasi from 1924 to 1928.

== Career as a Jain Pandit ==
As noted by Prakash Jain in his book Jain Community of Bundelkhand, one of the main objectives of Jain Sanskrit Vidyalayas—many of them established by Kshullaka Ganeshprasad Varni—was to train Jain Pandits or lay scholars well versed in the ancient languages of Prakrit and Sanskrit as well as Jain doctrine to study and conduct research on the vast body of untapped ancient texts preserved in temple complexes and shastra bhandars for centuries. However, the livelihood of these Pandits was affected by irregular sources of income and constant migration in search of work. They were also expected to live a simple, austere and conservative lifestyle befitting a Jain Pandit. Pandit Phoolchandra Shastri was one such Jain Pandit who followed this tradition and produced numerous works through translating, editing and writing books.

Pandit Phoolchandra Shastri had an excellent understanding of Jain philosophy and was considered as one of the greatest exponents of the Jain theory of Karma. He enunciated on philosophical and controversial topics in Jainism such as caste, stri-mukti (the liberation of women) and the inherent purity of souls. These topics were a matter of great debate between Digambara Pandits of Varanasi during the first few decades of the post-independence era. As noted by the Jain scholar, Prof. Padmanabh Jaini, Panditji's publishing of his research on niyativada based on various ancient Jain texts resulted in a great deal of debate amongst the Jain scholars. His interpretation of the philosophical concept of niyati or pre-destination, opened up a new field of research for the comparative study of Ajivika and Jain doctrines of bondage and salvation. He, along with his close friends and colleagues Pandit Kailash Chandra Shastri and Pandit Jaganmohan Lal Shastri, were famously known as the Ratnatrayi, that is, the three jewels of Jainism. He was a protégé of the noted Jain scholar and philosopher Ganeshprasad Varni. While he belonged to the Digambara Terapanth tradition, his ecumenical and non-sectarian approach helped him in reducing tensions between the Samaiya community of Taran Panth and his own Parvar community of Digambara Terapanth to which he belonged.

Pandit Phoolchandra Shastri is best known for editing and translating the Shatkhandagama and the Kasayapahuda. These texts represent the most important Digambara Jain canonical literature which was made accessible to modern society through the efforts of Panditji and a team of eminent Jain scholars like Dr. Hiralal Jain, Dr. A.N. Upadhye, Pt. Kailash Chandra Shastri, Pt. Hiralal Shastri, Pt. Balachandra Shastri, Pt. Nathuram Premi and Pt. Devakinandan Nayak. The entire work was carried on the basis of ancient palm leaf manuscripts. It continued from 1939 to 1985. Padmanabh Jaini notes that the Shatkhandagama and the Kasayapahuda along with their commentaries Dhavala, Mahadhavala and Jayadhavala, which were translated into Hindi by Pandit Phoolchandra, were of epic proportions consisting of 172,000 shlokas. He has also authored numerous books on Jainism like Varna, Jati Aur Dharma and Jain Tattvamimamsa. Besides the translation of Shatkhandagama and Kasayapahuda, he edited and translated numerous Jain ancient texts like the Tattvarthasutra, the Ratnakaranda Shravakachara and the Sarvarthasiddhi. He also edited Journals like Shanti-Sindhu published by Acharya Shanti Sagar Sarasvati Bhawan, Natepute (Solapur) from 1935 to 1937 and another journal Jnanodaya published by Bharatiya Jnanpith, Kashi from 1949 to 1952.

== Freedom Fighter and other Social Causes ==
Along with his career as a lecturer and Jain Scholar, Pandit Phoolchandra Shastri took part in the freedom struggle of India. He became an active member of the Indian National Congress during the British rule in India. He volunteered as an office bearer at Bina, Sagar, Solapur and Amravati, District Congress Committees. At the Amravati Congress Committee, he held the post of Joint Secretary. He also took part in various Congress conventions held at Yavatmal, Poona and Natepute. Panditji took an active part in the Quit India movement for which he was jailed. Panditji wore only Khadi clothes and was a strong proponent of the Swadeshi movement.

Pandit Phoolchandra Shastri also took an active part in social issues. He opposed many evil practices and customs prevalent in Jain society. He championed the cause of right of entry for untouchables into Jain temples. He supported the widely opposed Harijan Temple Entry Bill, 1949 on the grounds of the Jain doctrine which does not believe in the caste system. He also opposed unnecessary expenditure in the name of religion, especially on Gajraths, the processions of elephant-drawn chariots.

Panditji was a founding member of many institutions. He was one of the founding members and the first working joint-secretary of All India Digambara Jain Vidvat Parishad held in 1944. He was also instrumental in founding the Shri Ganesh Varni Inter College, Lalitpur, U.P. in 1946 which was funded by Seth Jineshvardas Taraiya of Lalitpur. In 1946 he became the founding member and secretary of Shri Sanmati Jain Niketan, Naria, Varanasi. He later founded the Shri Ganesh Varni Digamber Jain (Research) Institute, Varanasi in 1971. He was also a founding member and Joint Secretary and Editor of Shri Ganesh Prasad Varni Jain Granthmala in Varanasi.

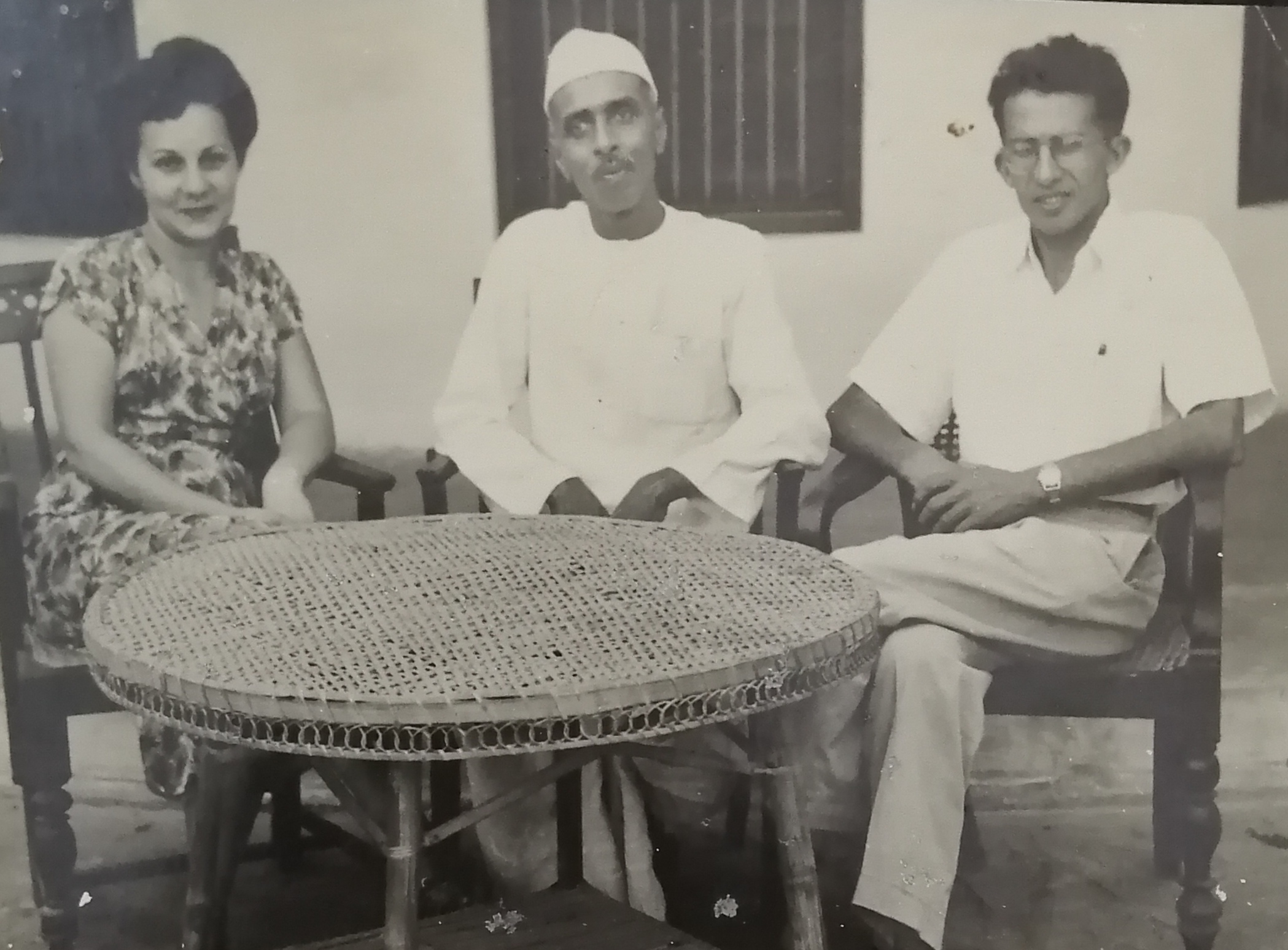
Pandit Phoolchandra Shastri with visiting German scholars studying Jainism

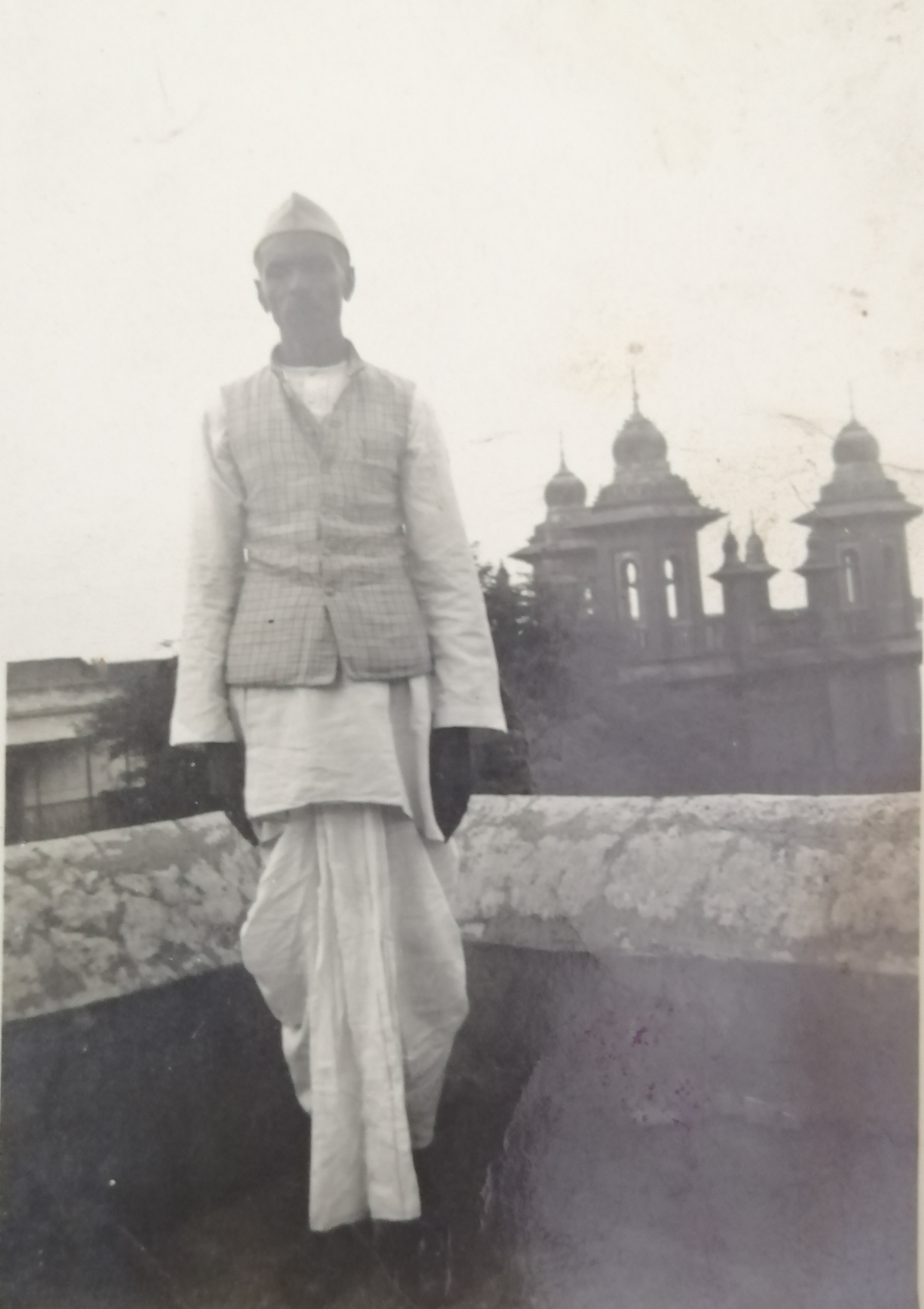
Panditji at the Shri Ganesh Prasad Varni Granthmala

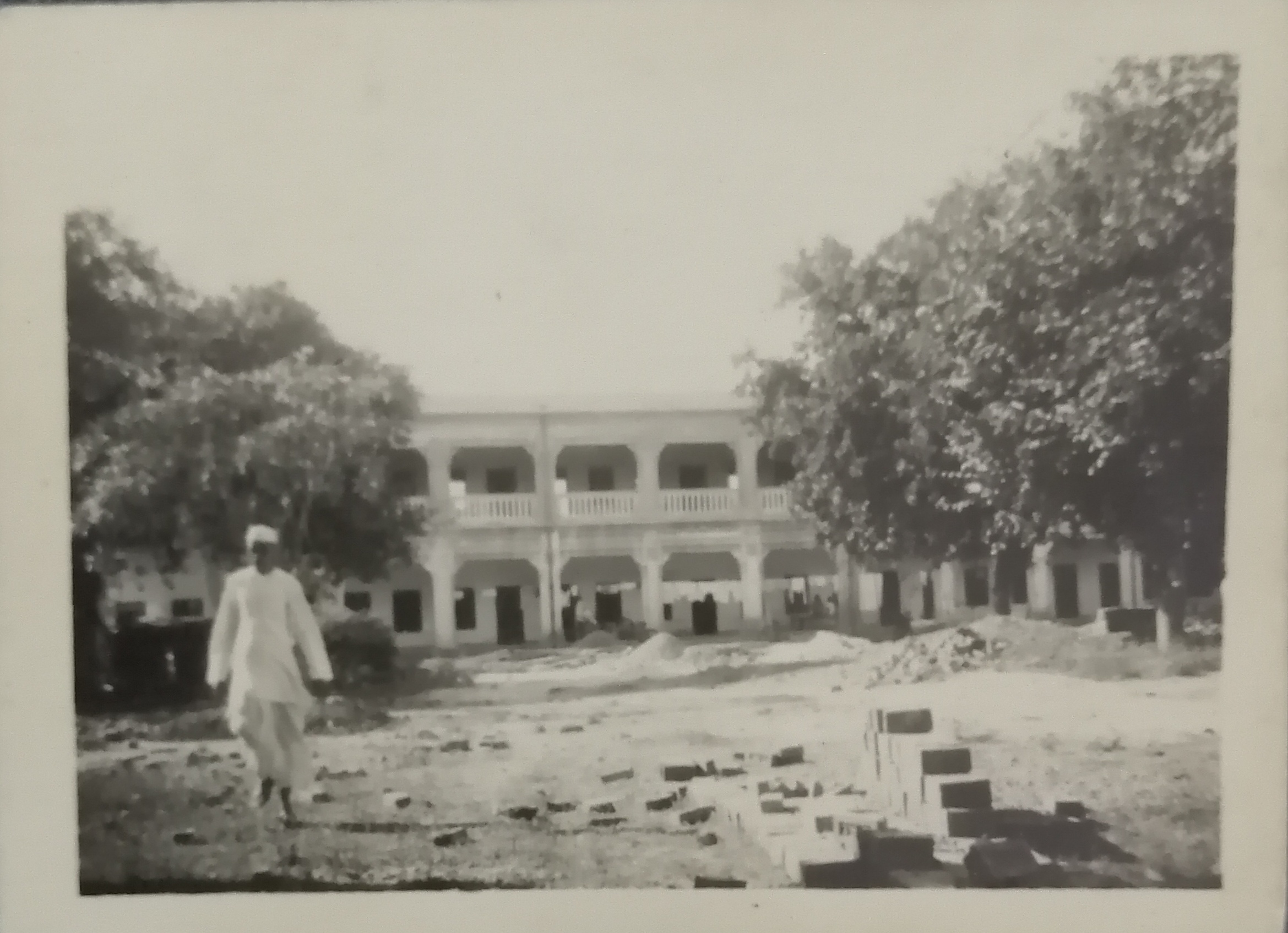
Panditji coming out of the Sanmati Jain Niketan, Varanasi

== Awards and Accolades ==
Panditji was conferred the title of Siddhantacharya at the Jain Siddhant Bhavan, Arrah (Bihar) in 1962 by the Governor of Bihar Dr. Ananthasayanam Ayyangar. Panditji was given the honorific Siddhantaratna by the Vice-President of India Basappa Jatti in 1974 on the occasion of the 2500th Nirvana celebrations of Bhagavan Mahavira. A felicitation volume was presented to him in 1985 in the presence of Acharya Vidyanand Muni. A silver plaque was presented to him in 1987 by the All India Digambar Jain Mahasangha. He was honoured with the Prakrit Jnan Bharti award by Svasti Shri Charukirti Bhattaraka at the First National Prakrit Conference, Bengaluru, 1990.

== Personal life ==
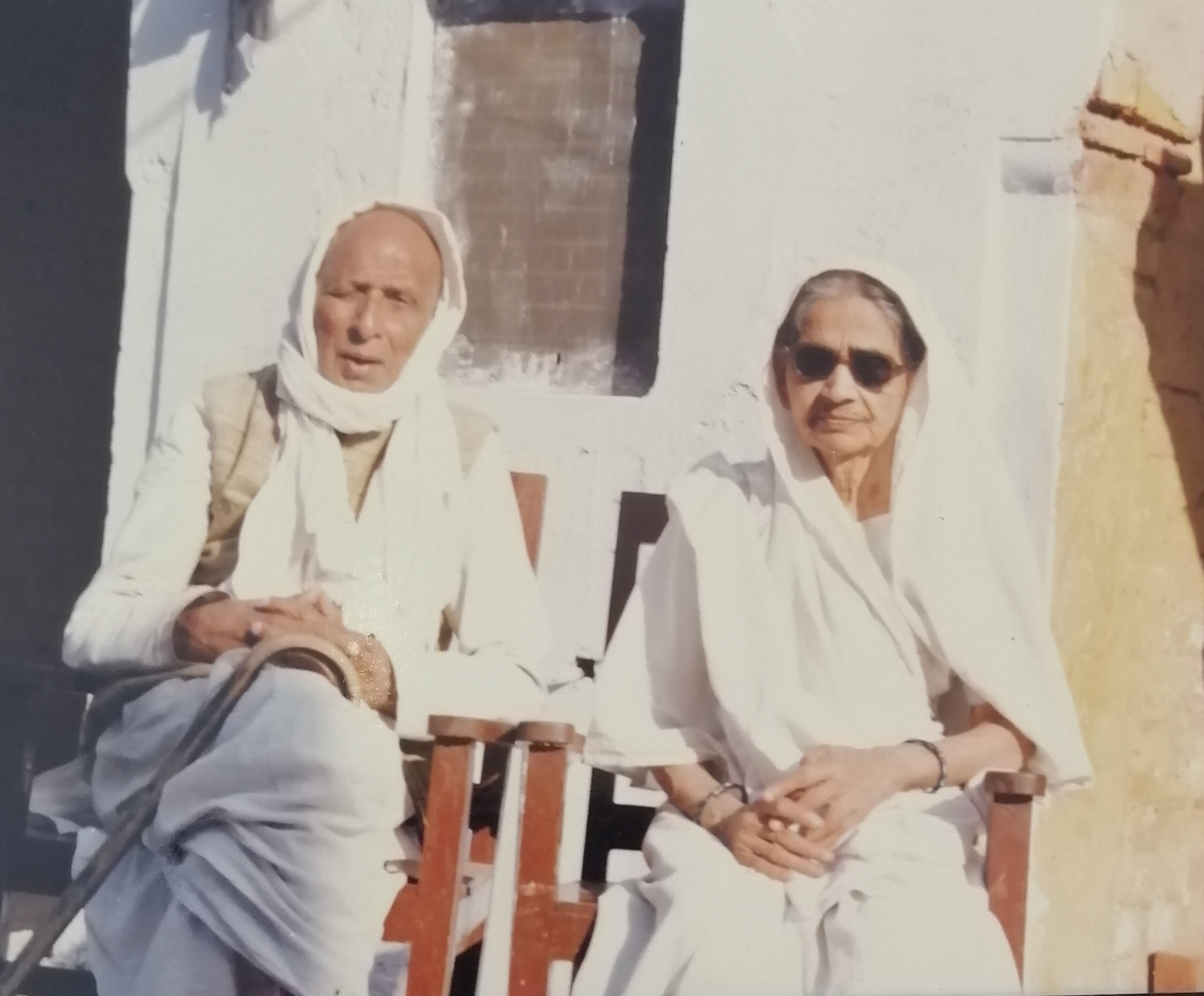
Pandit Phoolchandra Shastri with his wife Smt. Putlibai in the 80s

Panditji's wife's name was Putlibai. They had four children. The eldest was a daughter, late Dr. Shanti Jain (M.B.B.S., M.D.), who was married to Late Dr. Gyan Chand Jain (Computer Science). Their second daughter, Smt. Sushila Jain, MSc, (retd Principal, Government College, Bhopal), is married to a renowned advocate and former judge, Mr. Vijay Kumar Choudhary, Bhopal. Their third daughter Mrs. Pushpa Jain is married to Prof. Nemi Chand Jain, living in Arizona, USA. Their youngest is son Prof. Ashok Kumar Jain, PhD a nuclear scientist and formerly professor of Physics at IIT Roorkee. Dr. Ashok is married to Mrs. Neerja Jain, MSc, BEd Currently, Dr. Ashok Jain looks after the institutions created by Panditji and has been trying to preserve his writings. The Pandit Phool Chandra Shastri Foundation has been established in Panditji's honour. It publishes books on Jainism.

== Works and Publications ==
=== Books Authored ===
Books authored by Panditji:

- Jain Dharma Aur Varna Vyavastha – Bharatvarshiya Digamber Jain Parishad, Delhi, 1945.
- Vishvashanti Aur Aparigrahvaad – Shri Ganesh Varni Granthmala, Varanasi, 1946.
- Jain Tattvamimansa – Ashok Prakashan Mandir, Varanasi, 1960.
- Jain Tattvamimansa (revised and extended edition) – Ashok Prakashan Mandir, Varanasi, 1978; (third revised edition), – Siddhantacharya Pandit Phoolchandra Shastri Foundation, Roorkee, 1996.
- Varna, Jati Aur Dharma – Bhartiya Jnanpeeth, 1963;
- Jain Tatva Samiksha ka Samadhan – Pandit Todarmal Smarak Trust, Jaipur, 1987.
- Akinchitkar, Ek Anushilan – Ashok Prakashan Mandir, Varanasi, 1990.
- Parvar Jain Samaj ka ltihaas – Bharatvarshiya Digamber Jain Parvar Sabha, Jabalpur, 1992.

=== Translator and Editor ===
In addition to above, Pandit Phoolchandra Shastri also edited or translated the following texts:

- Ratnakarandaka Shravakacara of Acarya Samantabhadra, Shri Jain Sahitya Hindi Prasarak Karyalay, Mumbai (1935)
- Shatkhandagama (Dhavala) (translator and editor) published by S.S.L.C. Jain S. Fund, Vidisha, M.P. and J.S.S. Sangha, Solapur in the years 1939–1959 and 1973–1985.
- Kasayapahuda (Jai-Dhavala) Bharatvarshiya Digamber Jain Sangha, Mathura, U.P.(1941–86)
- Mahabandha, Bhartiya Jnanapeeth, New Delhi. (1944–70)
- Prameyaratnamala – Chaukhamba Sanskrit Series, Banaras, 1928.
- Aalap Paddhati, Shri Sakal Digamber Panchan Natepute ( Solapur), 1934.
- Saptatikaprakarana (Edited with Hindi commentary)- Aatmanand Jain Pracharak Pustakalaya, Agra,1948.
- Tattvarth Sutra (Edited with Hindi commentary) Ganesh Prasad Varni Jain Granthamala, Varanasi,1950, Shri Ganesh Varni Sansthan, Varanasi, 1981
- Panchadhyayi (Hindi commentary) – Ganesh Prasad Varni Granthamala, Varanasi, 1950.
- Jnanpeeth Pujanjali – Bhartiya Jnanpeeth Prakashan, Kashi, (second edition) 1957, 1977, 1982.
- Sarvarthasiddhi – ( edition and translation) – Bhartiya Jnanpeeth, New Delhi, 1960, 1985.
- Samayasaarakalasha (with meanings) – Shri Digambar Jain Svadhyay Madir Trust, Songarh, 1964.
- Shri Kahanji Swami Abhinandan Granth (Editor) – Digamber Jain Mumukshu Mandal, Mumbai, 1964.
- Khaniya Tattva-Charcha (Book One) – Acharyakalp Pandit Todarmal Granthmala, Jaipur, 1967.
- Khaniya Tattva-Charcha (Book Two) – Acharyakalp Pandit Todarmal Granthmala, Jaipur, 1967.
- Samyagyan-Dipika (Edited and translated) – Shri Digambara Jain Mumukshu Mandal, Bhavnagar, 1970.
- Labdhisaar-Kshapanasaar – Shrimad Rajchandra Aashram, Agaas, 1980.
