= Suresh Babu =

Suresh Babu may refer to:

- Suresh Babu (screenwriter), Indian film screenwriter
- Suresh Babu (long jumper), Indian athlete of long jump
- S. Suresh Babu, Indian atmospheric scientist
- D. Suresh Babu, Telugu film producer
