= Ahiyapur =

- Village
- Location in Uttar Pradesh, India Ahiyapur (India)
- Coordinates: 29.71°N 77.42°E
- Country: India
- State: Uttar Pradesh
- District: Saharanpur

Government
  - Body: Gram Panchayat

Languages
  - Official: Hindi
- Time zone: UTC+5:30 (IST)
- Vehicle registration: UP
- Nearest city: Saharanpur
- Civic agency: Gram Panchayat
- Climate: Normal (Köppen)
- Website: up.gov.in

Ahiyapur is a small village near Nanauta. Nanauta is a small town in Saharanpur district of Uttar Pradesh, located on State Highway 57 from Saharanpur to New Delhi.

Agriculture is the main source of income for almost all the villagers. Some people have started working in small industries and business in Nanauta.
