= Mohana (disambiguation) =

Mohana a town in Odisha.

Mohana may also refer to:

- Mohana Assembly constituency, in Odisha, India
- Mohana Bhogaraju, an Indian playback singer
- Mohanam, a rāgam in Carnatic music
  - Mohanakalyani, a rāgam in Carnatic music
- Mohana (tribe), in Sindh
- Mohana River, in Jharkhand India
- Mohana Silai, a Tamil language historical novel

== See also ==
- Mohan (disambiguation)
- Mohini (disambiguation)
- Mahan (disambiguation)
