= Pannalal Jain =

Indian Jain scholar (1911–2001)

Sahityacharya Pandit Pannalal Jain
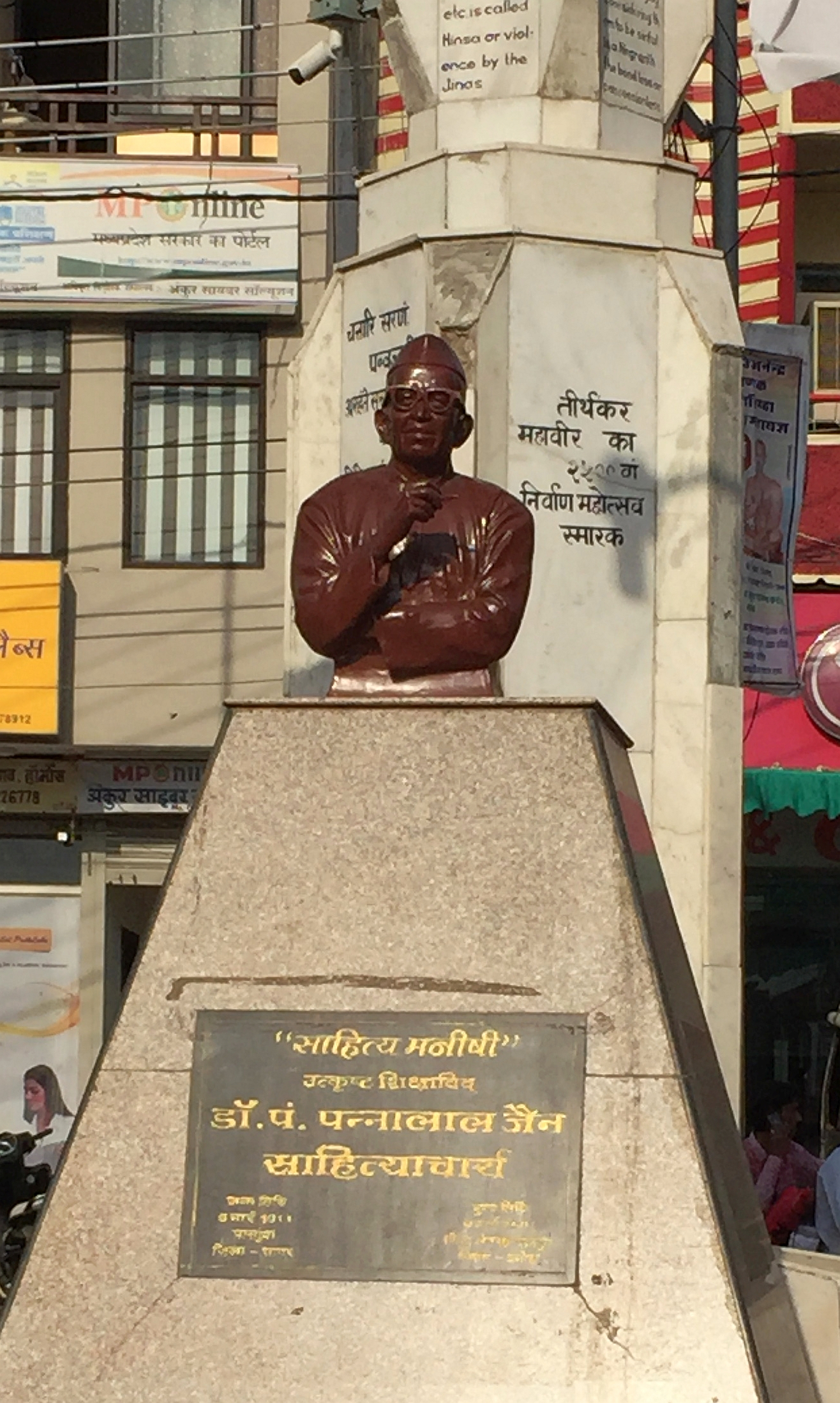
- Bust of Pt Pannalal Jain holding a pen, in Namakmandi, Sagar.

Personal life
- Born: 5 March 1911 Parguwan, Sagar District, Madhya Pradesh
- Died: 9 March 2001 (aged 90) Kundalpur, Madhya Pradesh
- Notable work: Mahapurana (195?) etc.
- Honors: Sahityacharyacharya, PhD

Religious life
- Religion: Jainism
- Philosophy: Jain

Religious career
- Teacher: Shiksha-Guru Dayachandra Shastri and Ganeshprasad Varni

Sahityacharya Dr. Pandit Pannalal Jain (5 March 1911 – 9 March 2001) was a distinguished Jain scholar. Dr. Kasturchand Kasliwal has regarded him as among the 20 most distinguished of the Jain scholars of 20th century His teaching career spanned 70 years, from 1931 to 2001.

== Life ==
He was the son of Gallilal and Jankibai of Parguvan, a small village in Sagar, born in 1911. He moved to Sagar with his mother after the death of his father in 1919. Pannalal studied at the famous institute in Sagar, "Sattarka Sudha Tarangini Sanskrit Pathashala", now Ganesh Varni Sanskrit Vidyalaya, founded by Ganeshprasad Varni. For a long time Pannalaji also taught there. He was married in 1931, same year he was appointed as a teacher at the Vidyalaya. Later he studied at Syadvadad Mahavidyalaya in Varanasi. He earned Sahityacharya degree in 1936. He spent most of his life in Sagar as the guiding scholar at Sattarka Sudha Tarangini Sanskrit Pathashala, later known as Ganesh Digambar Jain Sanskrit Mahavidyalaya, at Moraji, Sagar, from 1933 to 1983. After retiring he taught at Varni Digambar Jain Gurukul at Jabalpur until 8 January 2001.

He edited both volumes of the well known autobiography Meri Jivan Gatha by Kshullak Ganeshprasad Varni which were published in 1949 and 1960. He also edited Shri Ganeshprasad Varni Smriti Granth in 1974.

He had served as a guide to prominent monks and nuns. He assisted Acharya Vidyasagar in starting discourses on Dhavala texts in Sagar in 1980. He often advised Aryika Vishuddhamati when she headed the Mahilashram at Sagar. He was also associated with the Jain institutions at Dronagiri and Bada Malahara. In 1955, he helped organize the historic Gajrath as Prachar Mantri. He also assisted in the Gajrath festival at Khajuraho in 1981. He was associated with the Digambar Jain Vidyaparishad, a leading council of scholars, during 1946 to 1985.

A simple, gentle and unassuming traditional scholar, he was awarded a PhD by Sagar University in 1973 for his work on Mahakavi Harichand.

He was honoured by the President of India for his educational contributions to teaching of Sanskrit in 1969.

== Works ==
Jain is best known for his translations and commentaries of Sanskrit Puranic literature including Mahapurana, Uttarapurana, and Padmapurana.

He has also composed several vratodyapana texts based on classical Sanskrit sources.

He was given title Vidya-Varidhi (meaning the ocean of learning) by the Sagar shravakas in 1976.

He was a prolific author. His works

- Samyakavta Chintamani (1983 Mahavir Puraskar)
- Jivandhar Champu, (1959–60 Mitra award, MP Sahitya Parishad)
- Gadya Chintamani (1972 Dhaulpur, Dig. Jain Vidvatparishad) and
- Purudeva Champu (1974 Indore)

were given special awards by literary organisations.

Arhat-Vachan Journal commented on his death: "by his departure, a leading lighthouse of 20th century of the Jain scholarly tradition has fallen."

== Memorial and legacy ==
On 8 March 2001, at the Kundalpur Tirth, in the shadow of Lord Adinath Bade Baba, Pannalal Jain laid down his body, having entered his final meditation. In Sagar, the street passing through the centrally located Namak Mandi has been named Sahityacharya Pandit Pannalal Jain Marg, which has a bust in the middle of the road. His statue has been placed on Namak mandi tiraha, one way.

Achala Jain, who wrote her dissertation on his contributions to Sanskrit literature, was awarded a PhD by the Indore University.

The organisation Pannalal Jain Smararak Samiti honours Sanskrit scholars in Sagar.

Jain Muni Pratyakshsagar was his grandson.
