= University College, Thiruvananthapuram =

Public college in Palayam, India

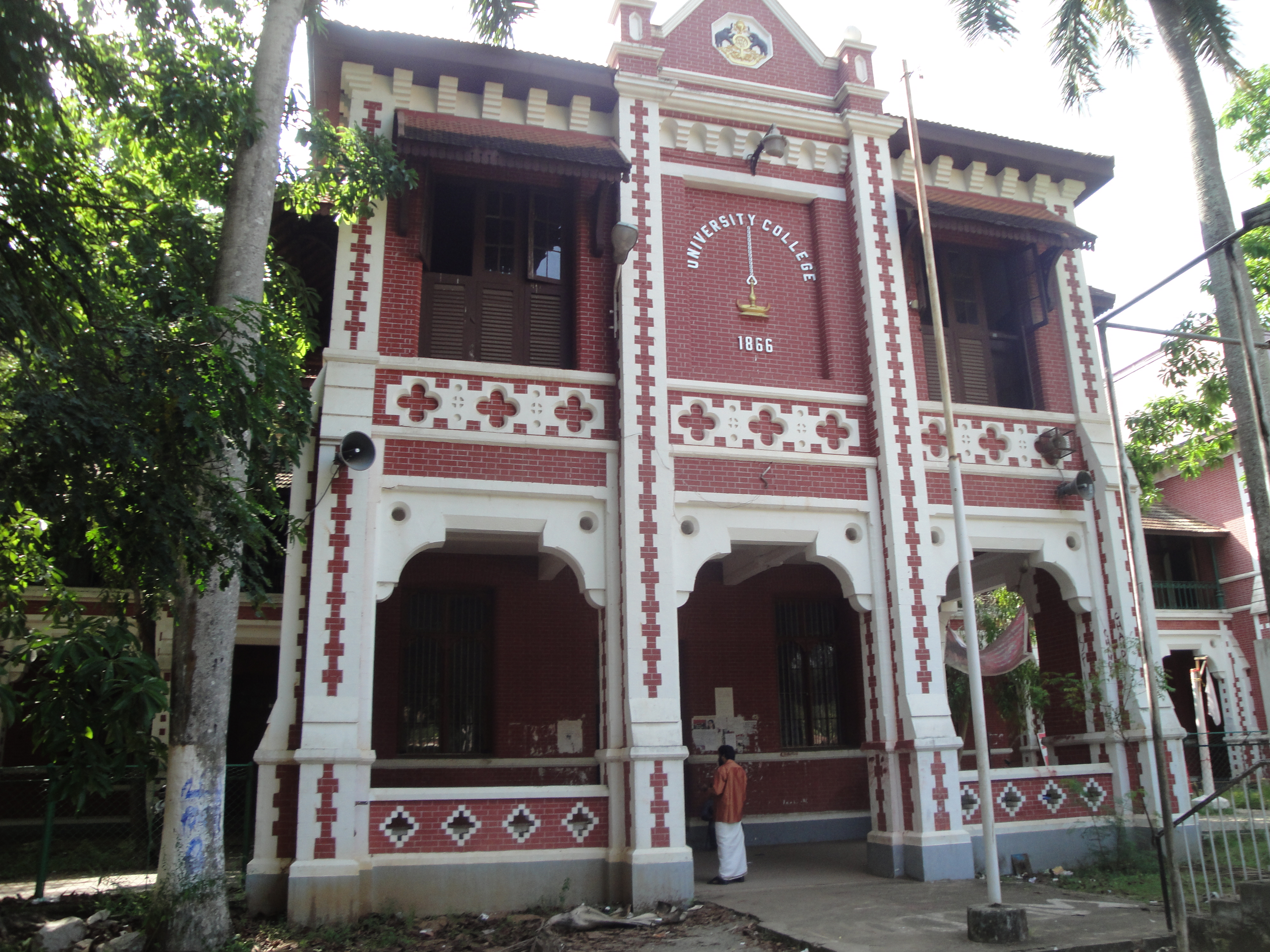
- Former names: The Raja's Free School (1834–1866); H.H. The Maharaja's College (1866–1924); H.H. The Maharaja's College of Science (1924–1942)
- Type: Public
- Established: 1866; 160 years ago
- Founder: Swathy Thirunal Rama Varma III
- Affiliations: University of Kerala
- Principal: Santhoshkumar K. R.
- Administrative staff: 278
- Students: 3164
- Location: Thiruvananthapuram
- Website: universitycollege.ac.in

University College, Thiruvananthapuram (UCT) is a public college situated in Palayam, Thiruvananthapuram, India. Established in 1866, it is one of the oldest colleges in Kerala. The college has been accorded "College with Potential for Excellence" (CPE) status by the University Grants Commission.

University College is identified as a heritage institution by the Government of Kerala. Alumni of the college includes luminaries such as the former President of India, K. R. Narayanan, numerous cabinet secretaries, ambassadors, civil servants, IT doyens, teachers, poets, writers, artists, politicians and the like.

== Academics ==
=== Faculties ===
Language faculties

- Faculty of English
- Faculty of Malayalam
- Faculty of Hindi
- Faculty of Arabic
- Faculty of Sanskrit
- Faculty of Tamil
- Faculty of French

Humanities faculties

- Faculty of Economics
- Faculty of History
- Faculty of Political Science
- Faculty of Islamic History
- Faculty of Philosophy

Science faculties

- Faculty of Chemistry
- Faculty of Biochemistry
- Faculty of Mathematics
- Faculty of Physics
- Faculty of Geology
- Faculty of Geography
- Faculty of Botany
- Faculty of Zoology
- Faculty of Statistics
- Faculty of Psychology

Other faculties

- Faculty of Physical Education

=== Rankings ===
College rankings

General – India
- NIRF (Colleges) (2022): 24

It is ranked 22nd among colleges in India by the National Institutional Ranking Framework (NIRF) in 2024.

== Notable alumni ==
University College Thiruvananthapuram has produced luminaries that include a former president of India, two former chief ministers of Kerala, cabinet secretaries, ambassadors, civil servants, IT doyens, teachers, poets, writers, artists and politicians.

- Abu Abraham, cartoonist
- A. A. Rahim, Member Of Parliament Rajya Sabha
- Alencier Ley Lopez, Malayalam Actor
- Alexander Thomas, former judge of Kerala High Court
- Anna Chandy, first woman judge in India; first woman in India to become a high court judge
- A. R. Raja Raja Varma, poet, grammatician, professor
- Ayyappa Paniker, poet and critic
- Balabhaskar, Malayalam music director and Violinist
- Balachandra Menon, national award-winning Indian film actor, director, and script writer & lawyer
- Bharath Gopi, Indian film actor, director, and producer
- Bheeman Raghu, actor
- C. K. Chandrappan Parliamentarian and former Kerala state secretary of CPI party
- C. V. Raman Pillai, playwright and novelist
- E. D. Jemmis, Bhatnagar award winner and former director of IISER-TVM
- Fathima Beevi first woman judge of Supreme Court of India
- George Joseph
- G. Madhavan Nair, former chairman of ISRO
- Gopinath Kartha, Indian crystallographer who determined the structure of ribonuclease
- G. R. Anil, Minister for Civil Supplies & Legal Metrology, Government of Kerala
- G. Venugopal, Malayalam playback singer, composer
- Jacob Punnoose, former director general of police, Kerala
- Jassie Gift, Indian playback singer
- J C Daniel, "father of Malayalam cinema"
- J. Alexander (politician), former chief secretary and cabinet minister, Karnataka State
- Karamana Janardanan Nair, Malayalam actor
- Kesari Balakrishna Pillai
- K.M. Chandy - former governor (MP, Gujarat & Pondicherry)
- K. T. Chacko, former directorate general of foreign trade
- Kodiyeri Balakrishnan, former secretary of CPI(M) Kerala state, former minister of home affairs State of Kerala
- K. R. Narayanan, former president of India.
- Kris Gopalakrishnan, CEO of Infosys
- K. Shankar Pillai, cartoonist and Padma Bhushan recipient
- Madhu, film actor
- Mahesh Narayan, Malayalam film director and editor
- Malayattoor Ramakrishnan, IAS officer, author, cartoonist
- Mary Poonen Lukose, obstetrician, gynaecologist, first female surgeon general of India
- M. Krishnan Nair, writer, literary critic, and orator
- M. K. Sanu, professor, orator, critic, biographer
- Mohan Sivanand, former editor-in-chief, Reader's Digest India, painter
- M. M. Jacob, former governor of Arunachal Pradhesh
- M.S.Swaminathan, "father of Green Revolution" in India
- Nitya Chaitanya Yati, philosopher, psychologist, and poet
- O. N. V Kurup, poet, lyricist, professor and Jnanpith award winner
- Pattom A. Thanu Pillai, former chief minister of Kerala
- P. C. Alexander, civil servant, administrator
- P. Gopinathan Nair, Gandhian and Padma Shri recipient
- P. K. Iyengar, Indian nuclear physicist
- P. Padmarajan, Indian author, screenwriter, and film director
- P. Parameswaran, Padma Vibhushan awardee, president of Vivekananda Kendra
- Prasanth Reghuvamsom, Senior Journalist, Asianet News
- Priyadarshan, national award-winning Indian film director, script writer, and producer
- Raja Ravi Varma, world-famous painter
- Raman Viswanathan, chest physician and Padma Bhushan awardee
- R. Sankar, former chief minister of Kerala
- Sabumon Abdusamad, Malayalam actor and television anchor
- Sethunathasarma Krishnaswami, geochemist, Shanti Swarup Bhatnagar laureate
- Shaji N. Karun, national award-winning Indian film director and cinematographer
- S. Guptan Nair, Malayalam writer, critic, scholar, and orator
- S. Suresh Babu, atmospheric scientist, Shanti Swarup Bhatnagar laureate
- Subbayya Sivasankaranarayana Pillai, mathematician
- Sudheer Karamana, Malayalam film actor and artist
- Sugathakumari, poet and environmentalist
- Sukumaran, Malayalam film actor, producer
- S. Venkitaramanan, former governor of Reserve Bank of India
- Thanu Padmanabhan, Indian theoretical physicist
- T. K. Rajeev Kumar, Malayalam director'
- Krishnan Rajeshwar, Chemist, researcher and academic
- Tony Mathew, Orator, Writer
- T. P. Sreenivasan, Indian diplomat, former IFS officer
- Venu Nagavally, Malayalam director, actor, screenwriter
- V. Madhusoodanan Nair, professor, poet

== Notable principals ==
- John Ross M.A. 1866–1884
- Robert Harvey M.A., L.L.D. 1884–1890
- H. N. Read M.A. 1890–1892 (acting)
- Dr Alexander Crichton Mitchell D.Sc., F.R.S.E 1892–1909
- A.W. Bishop PhD 1909–1915
- L.C. Hodson M.A. 1912–1915
- A. R. Raja Raja Varma Kovil Thampuran MA 1915–1916, 1918
- Dr. J. Stephenson, BSc, A.R.D.S.C. 1916–1927
- James Pryde, M.A., BSc 1927–1930

== Controversy ==
On 3 May 2019, a first-year BSc Chemistry student attempted suicide on campus, alleging harassment from SFI leaders for not taking part in their programmes and disruption of classes.

On 12 July 2019, a final-year B.A. political science student was stabbed amid a dispute between two groups of students belonging to the SFI, following which two SFI leaders were arrested. Later in the day, answer sheets and the official seal of an assistant professor were recovered while clearing the SFI office on campus, raising questions on the credibility of examinations conducted by the university. The police also found fake seals and university answer sheets from the residence of a prime accused.

== See also ==
- Campus Violence in India
