= Srilamanthula Chandramohan =

- Born: Srilamanthula Chandramohan; 1981 (age 44–45); Madanapally, Andhra Pradesh, India.
- Education: BFA, Jawaharlal Nehru Technological University; MFA, Maharaja Sayajirao University
- Awards: 49th Lalit Kala Akademi National Exhibition award (2006); First prize, Bhopal Bienniale (2009)

Srilamanthula Chandramohan (born 1981) is an artist who was born in Madanapally, a village in Andhra Pradesh in southern India.

== Education ==
In 2004 he completed his Bachelor of Fine Arts degree in Painting from the Jawaharlal Nehru Technological University (JNTU) in Hyderabad and pursued a Master of Fine Arts degree in Graphics at the Maharaja Sayajirao University (MSU) in Baroda, Gujarat. He has received numerous important national and international awards for his work, including the 49th Lalit Kala Akademi National Exhibition award in 2006 for Remorse I and more recently first prize in the 2009 Bhopal Bienniale for Remorse VI.

== Later work ==
Srilamanthula Chandramohan was at the center of a controversy regarding artwork that he exhibited at the Faculty of Fine Arts, MSU Baroda. At the time of the dispute he was a final year post-graduate student. Protests against artworks by Chandramohan began on 9 May 2007.

The paintings were part of an annual exam, however by tradition, the public was invited to view the paintings. Times of India (7 May 2007) and Gujarati daily Sandesh (9 May 2007) mentioned that the works of art created by the students of the faculty as a part of their Annual Examination were open for public display on 9 May 2007. Among the earliest to protest was the district superintendent of the Methodist Church in Baroda, Reverend Emmanuel Kant He said,

A group of irate supporters of Hindutva, led by Niraj Jain, a Bharatiya Janata Party (BJP) activist, accompanied by local police, also came into the exhibition venue. Jain, who had complained to the police about the allegedly blasphemous nature of the paintings, demanded the paintings be removed. The two objectionable painting were described by University Vice-Chancellor Manoj Soni as:

1. "A huge Christian Cross where Lord Jesus Christ was shown with his penis out on the Cross, his palms and feet hanging from the two sides and the bottom of the Cross, respectively. Semen was shown as dropping out of his penis into a real toilet commode placed beneath the Cross. The toilet contained fishes." However Fine Arts Faculty members claimed that liquid depicted is not semen but "body fluids".
2. "Another very large sized painting showed a woman in nude posture. A baby was shown as attempting to come out of the vagina of the woman. The picture depicted the woman trying to attack the baby with a Trishul. The painting had the words 'Durga Mate' written at the bottom." The professors explained the painting as "Goddess Durga is enacting the crime of foeticide in order to call attention to the horror and violence of the act that amounts to murder in the very womb".

He has stated that "My aim is to show the purity, truth and reality in human beings using the images of god and goddesses." There was no attack on Chandramohan, nor were his paintings destroyed. There was no vandalism, although it was widely claimed. Chandramohan was arrested and later released on 14 May.

Throughout the controversy the Indian art community rallied to Chandramohan's cause, claiming that the closing of the exhibition and his arrest was a direct assault of the rights of freedom of expression. Students and artists held protests nationwide. A group of students and artists at MSU Baroda sought to stage a protest demonstration at the Faculty of Fine Arts by organising an exhibition of photographs taken from the classical and explicitly erotic sculptures that adorn the Khajuraho temples in Madhya Pradesh. When news of this protest exhibition was released, the Dean of the Faculty of Fine Arts, Shivaji Panikkar, was asked to prohibit it. Dean Panikkar refused, and was subsequently suspended indefinitely from the University.

The incident was widely reported in the national media as an attack by the Sangh Parivar, in most cases with no mention of the Christian objection to the Jesus painting.

=== Arrest ===
On a note of meeting VC of university to ask for the reason behind the extreme delay of his results, Chandra Mohan entered university's head office and with kerosene set it on fire. Police further arrested him on criminal offence and the case is subject to law.
