= Nanautawi =

Nanautawi or Nanautavi or Nanotvi or Nanotwi refers to people who belong to Nanauta, a place in the Indian state of Uttar Pradesh:

- Mamluk Ali Nanautawi (1789–17 October 1851), Head Teacher of Zakir Husain Delhi College
- Mazhar Nanautawi (1821 – 3 October 1885, a founding figure of Mazahir Uloom
- Muhammad Qasim Nanautawi (1832 – 15 April 1880), Founder of Darul Uloom Deoband
- Muhammad Yaqub Nanautawi (1833–1884), First Principal of Darul Uloom Deoband
- Muhammad Ahmad Nanautawi (1862-1930), 8th Vice Chancellor of Darul Uloom Deoband
