= Mohini (disambiguation) =

Mohini is the only female avatar of the Hindu god Vishnu and goddess Parvati.

Mohini or Jaganmohini may also refer to:

== People ==
- Mohini (Tamil actress) (born 1978), an Indian Tamil actress
- Mohini (Assamese actress) (1919–1951), an Indian Assamese actress
- Mohini Bhardwaj (born 1978), a retired Indian-American gymnast
- Mohini Mohun Chatterji (1858–1936), a Bengali attorney and scholar
- Mohini Dey (born 1996), Indian bass player
- Ratna Mohini (1904–1988), a Javanese dancer and the wife of French photographer Henri Cartier-Bresson
- V. Mohini Giri (born 1938), an Indian social activist

== Films and television ==
- Mohini Bhasmasur, a 1913 Indian silent film
- Mohini (1948 film), a 1948 Indian Tamil film
- Jaganmohini (1951 film), a 1951 Indian film
- Mohini (1957 film), a 1957 Indian Hindi film
- Mohini Bhasmasura, a 1966 Indian Kannada film
- Jaganmohini (1978 film), a 1978 Indian film
- Jaganmohini (2009 film), a 2009 Indian Tamil-language film
- Mohini (2018 film), a 2018 Indian Tamil film
- Mohini 9886788888, a 2006 Indian Kannada film
- Mohini (TV series), an Indian Tamil soap opera

== Fictional characters ==
- Mohini, a female character in Tezaab
- Mohini, a character in the film Baaghi 2
- Mohini, a character from Lemonade Mouth
- Mohini, a character from Happy New Year

== Other uses ==
- Mohini waterfall, waterfall located in Nepal

== See also ==
- Mohan (disambiguation)
- Mohana (disambiguation)
- Mohini Mansion Ki Cinderellayain, Pakistani television series
