= Krishnan Rajeshwar =

American chemist

- Occupations: Chemist, researcher and academic

Academic background
- Education: B.Sc. Chemistry; M.Sc. Chemistry; Ph.D. Solid-State Chemistry
- Alma mater: University College Thiruvananthapuram; Indian Institute of Technology; Indian Institute of Science; St Francis Xavier University; Colorado State University
- Thesis: Effect of prior mechanical and thermal treatment on the thermal decomposition and sublimation of cubic ammonium perchlorate (1975)

Krishnan Rajeshwar is a chemist, researcher and academic. He is a Distinguished University Professor and Founding Director of the Center for Renewable Energy Science & Technology at The University of Texas at Arlington.

Rajeshwar's research is focused on solar energy conversion, solar water splitting, and materials chemistry. He is most known for demonstrating the use of molten salt electrolytes for electrode stabilization in photoelectrochemical (PEC) devices and holds several patents. He co-authored the book Environmental Electrochemistry: Fundamentals and Applications in Pollution Abatement, edited Solar Hydrogen Generation: Toward a Renewable Energy Future, and has published journal articles and book chapters. He is the recipient of the Wilfred T. Doherty Award, Energy Technology Division Research Award, Electrodeposition Division Research Award, and the Distinguished Research Award from the University of Texas at Arlington.

Rajeshwar is a fellow of the Council of Scientific & Industrial Research and an elected fellow of the Electrochemical Society. He is also a member of the Physical and Biophysical Chemistry Division at IUPAC and a Phi Beta Kappa member of the American Chemical Society, which honored him with a special symposium for his work in environmental chemistry. His editorial roles include serving as a guest editor for a special issue of the Journal of Applied Electrochemistry on Heterogeneous Photocatalysis as well as Editor for the Electrochemical Society journal Interface. He is serving as the Appointed Editor-in-Chief of the ECS Journal of Solid-State Science & Technology.

== Education ==
Rajeshwar earned his bachelor's degree in Chemistry at University College Thiruvananthapuram in 1969, followed by his master's degree from the Indian Institute of Technology in 1971. He graduated with a Ph.D. in Solid-State Chemistry at the Indian Institute of Science in 1975 and undertook post-doctoral fellowships at both St. Francis Xavier University and Colorado State University.

== Career ==
Rajeshwar started as an assistant professor for the Department of Chemistry and Biochemistry and served as an associate professor from 1987 to 1989 and then professor from 1989 to 2004. In 2003 he assumed the position of associate dean for the College of Science and has been serving as a Distinguished University Professor at UTA since 2004.

Since 2004, Rajeshwar he has been serving as the founding director of the Center for Renewable Energy Science & Technology.

Rajeshwar co-founded the Rocky Mountain Thermal Analysis Society in 1982. In 1998, he assumed the role of chair for the Awards Sub-Committee within the Dallas-Fort Worth Section of the American Chemical Society while serving as a member of the Technical Advisory Panel for the Research Corporation for Scientific Advancement and Water Environment Research Foundation. From 2016 to 2017 he served as the Elected President for the Electrochemical Society.

== Research ==
Rajeshwar's research interests lie in the fields of photoelectrochemistry, solar energy conversion, renewable energy, materials chemistry, semiconductor electrochemistry, and environmental chemistry. His research contributions include the electrosynthesis of novel semiconductor films and advanced protective coatings for photoelectrochemical cells, the study of ion transport in polymer electrodes, the development of in situ monitoring techniques, and the mechanisms of heterogeneous photocatalysis. In 1986, he and his colleagues secured a $1,996,000 grant for his research called Electronic and Ionic Transport in Polymers as part of the DoD-DARPA University Research Initiative.

Rajeshwar has made contributions to environmental electrochemistry, including co-developing electrodeposited CdTe/CdS solar photovoltaic cells and demonstrating conducting transparent oxide-coated Si electrodes for photoelectrochemical applications. He has also developed a methodology for finely dispersed noble metal catalyst particles in a conducting polymer matrix and studied the electrosynthesis and growth mechanisms of conducting semiconductor and polymer films. His research has contributed to developing electrosynthesized composite structures for efficient photoreduction of CO_{2} and spatially-directed electrodeposition of semiconductor nanoparticles or films. He has also developed new, green technology for stripping paint without the need for noxious organic solvents, which led to a U.S. patent and a start-up company.

=== Water treatment and pollution remediation ===
Rajeshwar's environmental chemistry research has focused on water treatment and pollution remediation. In 1994, he emphasized the need for alternatives to chlorine due to EPA regulations on high total organic carbon water, and explored options like chlorine dioxide, ozone, and advanced filtration. He also applied electrochemical techniques in drinking water and novel electrode materials in environmental tech. Extending his work, he researched photocatalytic methods for pollutant treatment and their commercial potential. In 2008, one of his highly cited review studies covered thirty years of research on photocatalytic treatment of organic dyes in air and water, emphasizing titanium dioxide (TiO_{2}) as the main photocatalyst and addressing preparation, kinetics, sensitization mechanism, and practical applications.

=== Electrochemistry and energy applications ===
Rajeshwar has conducted studies on advancements in electrochemistry and semiconductor-electrolyte interfaces. Co-authored with Jorge Ibanez, his book Environmental Electrochemistry has explored how electrochemical science and engineering can address environmental challenges, covering pollution detection and remediation with electrochemical-based sensors and technologies. It was also the first book to review electro- and photoelectrochemical methods for these purposes. He has explored semiconductor-electrolyte interfaces, tracing their historical development, modern applications in energy conversion, and contributions to microelectronics and environmental tech.

Rajeshwar edited the book Solar Hydrogen Generation: Toward a Renewable Energy Future which provided a scientific account of hydrogen generation through solar energy and renewable sources. Additionally, he studied CO_{2}-to-solar-fuels electrochemistry with a focus on industrial continuous-flow reactors, evaluating performance and introducing a benchmarking framework to assess their effectiveness.

=== Applications in materials science ===
Rajeshwar has published papers on the evolving landscape of materials science. He discussed a range of semiconductor-based composite materials used in various applications, including photocatalysis, photovoltaic cells, displays, light-emitting devices, and sensors to emphasize the advancements in the field of material science. His research on the Prussian blue analogs on six metal hexacyanoferrate (MHCF) discussed their synthesis, characterization, and applications revealing the structural changes due to ion interactions. He provided insights into energy-efficient inorganic oxide semiconductors, like tungsten trioxide (WO_{3}), produced through combustion synthesis, highlighting self-sustained high process temperatures and tunable optical properties.

== Awards and honors ==
- 1991 – Distinguished Research Award, University of Texas at Arlington.
- 1994 – Wilfred T. Doherty Award, American Chemical Society
- 2009 – Energy Technology Division Research Award, The Electrochemical Society
- 2019 – Electrodeposition Division Research Award, The Electrochemical Society,

== Bibliography ==
=== Selected books ===
- Environmental electrochemistry: fundamentals and applications in pollution abatement (1997) ISBN 978-0125762601
- Solar Hydrogen Generation: Toward a Renewable Energy Future (2008) ISBN 978-0387728094

=== Selected articles ===
- Rajeshwar, K. I. J. G., Ibanez, J. G., & Swain, G. M. (1994). Electrochemistry and the environment. Journal of applied electrochemistry, 24(11), 1077–1091.
- Wei, C., Lin, W. Y., Zainal, Z., Williams, N. E., Zhu, K., Kruzic, A. P., ... & Rajeshwar, K. (1994). Bactericidal activity of TiO_{2} photocatalyst in aqueous media: toward a solar-assisted water disinfection system. Environmental science & technology, 28(5), 934–938.
- Rajeshwar, K., de Tacconi, N. R., & Chenthamarakshan, C. R. (2001). Semiconductor-based composite materials: preparation, properties, and performance. Chemistry of Materials, 13(9), 2765–2782.
- De Tacconi, N. R., Rajeshwar, K., & Lezna, R. O. (2003). Metal hexacyanoferrates: electrosynthesis, in situ characterization, and applications. Chemistry of Materials, 15(16), 3046–3062.
- Rajeshwar, K., Osugi, M. E., Chanmanee, W., Chenthamarakshan, C. R., Zanoni, M. V. B., Kajitvichyanukul, P., & Krishnan-Ayer, R. (2008). Heterogeneous photocatalytic treatment of organic dyes in air and aqueous media. Journal of photochemistry and photobiology C: photochemistry reviews, 9(4), 171–192.
