= K. T. Chacko =

Indian administrative officer

K.T. Chacko
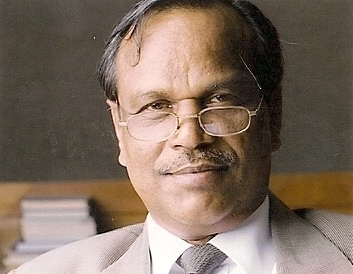

Director Indian Institute of Foreign Trade
- In office 2007–2012
- Preceded by: Probir Sengupta
- Succeeded by: Dr. Surajit Mitra

Directorate General of Foreign Trade
- In office 2004–2006
- Preceded by: Gopal Krishna Pillai
- Succeeded by: Bhawani Singh Meena

Personal details
- Born: Kayyalathu Thomas Chacko; 29 October 1947 (age 78) Kottayam, Kerala, India
- Education: University College Trivandrum; Harvard University

Kayyalathu Thomas Chacko (born 29 October 1947) is a retired Indian Administrative Service officer who held several public offices in the Government of India. He was appointed Directorate General of Foreign Trade from 2004 to 2006 and he also served as Director Indian Institute of Foreign Trade from 2007 to 2012. He is widely known for his commitment to increasing India's participation and role in the global economy.

== Early life and education ==
K.T. Chacko was born on October 29, 1947, to the Kayyalathu house, a Syrian Orthodox Christian family, the youngest of four children, in Kottayam District, Kerala. He studied at the University College Trivandrum where he did his Masters in Economics, obtaining the 1st Rank in the University and in the State and was awarded 3 Gold Medals for meritorious achievements. He then went to study at John F. Kennedy School of Government Harvard University on Edward S. Mason Fellowship where he earned a master's degree in public administration (Class of 1984).

== Career ==
K.T. Chacko joined the Indian Police Service in 1971. He wrote the civil service exam again next year and was accepted into the Indian Administrative Service.

He joined the IAS as a trainee in 1973. As an officer of the Indian Administrative Service he served for over 33 years in executive, secretarial and Policy making assignments. During his career as an IAS officer, he spent 13 years of service in the Govt of India and served the State Govt of Madhya Pradesh for 20 years. Some of the key positions/assignments he held.
