= Mohan Galot =

Kenyan businessman (born 1945)

Mohan Galot (born April 1945) is a Kenyan businessman, the owner of London Distillers.

In 2016, he and his wife Santosh Galot were arrested on forgery charges, but criminal charges against the businessman and his wife were dropped in December 2016, as they were deemed not to meet the "threshold for fair prosecution".

In response, Galot sought a private prosecution of his nephews Pravin Galot and Rajesh Galot and Registrar of Companies officers whom they allegedly colluded with.
