= Ambehta Mohan =

Ambehta Mohan is a village situated in the Nanauta Mandal of Saharanpur district in Uttar Pradesh, India. Ambehta Mohan is located 11.90 kilometres from the Mandal headquarters in Nanauta and is 458 km distance from the state capital Lucknow.

Villages nearby include Jadauda Panda (1.6 km), Uumri Majbata (3.8 km), Mushkipur (4.0 km), Tilfara Ainabad (4.4 km), Balu Mazra (4.6 km), Lukadari (5.0 km), and Sisauni (5.1 km).
