= Mahan =

Mahan or Mahaan may refer to:

== Places ==
=== Iran ===
- Mahan, Iran, a city in Kerman Province
- Mahan District, an administrative subdivision of Kerman Province
- Mahan Rural District, an administrative subdivision of Kerman Province
- Mahan, Hamadan, a village in Hamadan Province, Iran
- Mahan Air, an airline based in Kerman province

=== United States ===
- Mahan, Missouri, a community in the United States

== Films ==
- Mahaan (1983 film), an Indian Hindi-language film
- Mahaan (1992 film), a 1992 Indian Malayalam-language film
- Mahaan (2022 film), an Indian Tamil-language film

== Other uses ==
- Mahan (name)
- Mahan confederacy, chiefdoms in ancient Korea
- Mahan language, an ancient language of the Mahan confederacy
- Mahan Island, the conjoined Lanzarote and Fuerteventura in Canary Islands prehistory
- Master Mahan, a title of uncertain meaning, applied to Cain and his descendant Lamech in the Book of Moses
- Mahan (horse)

== See also ==
- Maha (disambiguation)
- USS Mahan (disambiguation)
- McMahon (disambiguation)
- Mahaanta, a 1997 Indian Hindi-language film
- Mahaan Hutatma, a 2018 Indian short film by Sagar Puranik
- Mahaan Kanakku, a 2011 Indian Tamil-language film
