= Niraj Jain =

Indian Jainism scholar, poet, and archaeologist (1926–2013)

Pandit Niraj Jain
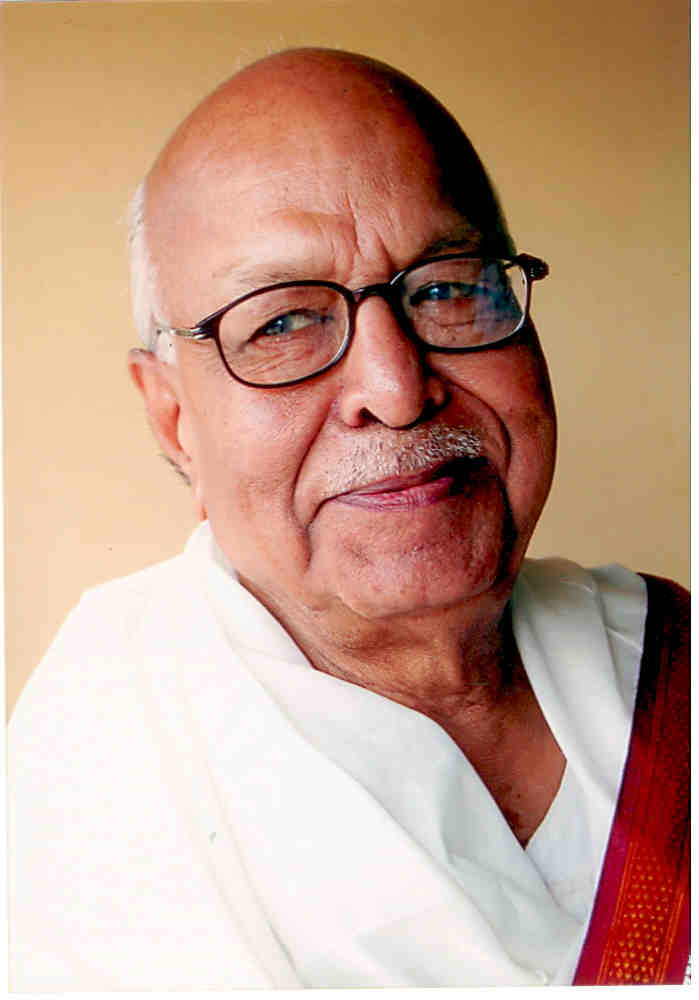
- Title: Pandit

Personal life
- Born: 31 October 1926 Rithi, Katni District, Madhya Pradesh
- Died: 26 March 2013 (aged 86) Satna, Madhya pradesh
- Notable work: Gommatesh Gatha etc.

Religious life
- Religion: Jainism

Religious career
- Teacher: Ganeshprasad Varni

Pandit Niraj Jain (31 October 1926 – 26 March 2013) was a scholar of Jainism, archaeologist, poet and speaker. His contributions to Jain studies span nearly 60 years. He was also an expert on Urdu poetry, which is unusual for a Jain scholar. He was associated with several organisations. He also lectured on the Ramayana He was a proponent of preserving historical nature of ancient temples. He had travelled and lectured widely in India and overseas .

== Life ==
He was born at Rithi, where his father Singhai Lakshmandas was an associate and follower of Ganeshprasad Varni. He was largely self-taught, he continued to study throughout his life while he struggled with day-to-day running of a printing press. He earned his bachelor's degree at the age of 45 along with youngest son. He was inspired by 105 Shri Ganeshprasad Varni. He sometimes accompanied him, recorded his lectures and eventually wrote the final chapter of Meri Jivan Gatha, Part II, autobiography of Ganeshprasad Varni.

He specialised in Jain archaeology and history, theory of Karma, Ahimsa and Anekanta. He was a proponent of harmony among Jains of different traditions, although he frequently engaged in theological debates. He had a keen interest in study of religion from new perspectives, Hindi and Urdu Poetry as well as journalism. He travelled extensively in India, both in North as well as South, and abroad to deliver religious discourses. He visited European countries to spread the message of Non-Violence on the occasion of 2500th anniversary of the Nirvana of Bhagwan Mahaveer in 1975.

He attended 1997 Toronto and 1999 Philadelphia JAINA Conventions. He visited Many Jain Centers in North America for lectures and workshops. He participated in World Parliament of Religions at Cape Town (SA) in 1999. He wrote extensively in field of ancient Indian history, art and archaeology. His documentation and study of ancient monuments and idols have been widely used by scholars. he was an expert on Indian iconography in general and Jain Art in particular.

== Family ==
His sister Sumitra Bai (1928–2002), earned Sahityaratna and Vidyalankar degrees and served as the head of Jain Mahilashram in Sagar and later took diksha in 1964 and was named Aryika Vishuddhmati ji. She wrote Samadhi Deepak, Shraman Charya, Nirwan Kalyanak & Diwali Pujan Vidhi, Shravak Suman Sanchay, Trilokasara, Ashtottara-shatanama-stotram. She took sallekhana in 2002 at Nandanwan Dhariyavad (Rajasthan).

His younger brother Pandit Nirmal Jain was also a poet, author and a scholar of Jainism. He has been active in promoting vegetarianism and ahimsa. He died in 2020 or 2021 at the age of 88.

== Works ==
Shri Niraj Jain has written more than two dozen books on various religions and spiritual topics. Some of the most popular include

- Jain Monuments at Khajuraho, 1968, 1999.
- Chittod Darshan, 1980.
- Gomatesh Gatha, 1981, 2004 (translated in Kannada, Marathi & Gujrati)
- Manavata kee Dhuri, 1990–2003 (Hindi, Gujarati, Marathi editions) Based on discourses to Madhav Prasad Birla.
- Ratangiri ke Bahubali,
- Kundalpur (1949–2000 editions)
- Mahotsav Darshan, Gommateshwar Centenary Festival, 1984.
- Neeraj Jain, Bharhut Stupa Gatha (Hindi), Ed. Ramnarayan Singh Rana, Satna, 2007, p. 51–52
- Prathamacharya Shantisagarji aur Bhattaraka Parampara, 2004.

More than a hundred of his articles have been published in various magazines, papers etc. He was well-known orator of Jain and Hindu Philosophy and regularly invited for delivering talks. He was associated with many national committees related to Jainism such as Shree Digambar Jain Mahasabha, Akhil Bhartiya Vidwat Parishad, Shravanbelgola Managing Committee etc.

He was the first scholar to identify the Bade Baba image at Kundalpur as an image of Lord Rishabh based on the hair and images of Chakreshvari devi and Gomukha Yaksha.

Here is a list of some of the Titles authored / co-authored / edited / co-edited by him:

- 1960: Tula Daan
- 1976: Kundalpur (8ed)
- 1981: Gomtesh Gatha
- 1984: Gomteshwar Sahasrabdi Mahotsav Darshan 1981
- 1986 (Shravan Shukla Saptmi): Raksha Bandhan Katha
- 1988: Songardh Sameeksha
- 1989 Guru Poornima: Kyun Banate hain Naya Sampradaya?
- 1992: Ahimsa Aur Aparigrah
- 1993: [Edited] Shanti dhara smarika (Mahamastakabhishek Mahotsav 1993)
- 1993: Shri Gomtesh Bahubali Jin Puja
- 1995: Ratnagiri ke Bahubali
- 1995: Dharmasthal aur uske yashasvi dharmadhikari Sharddheya Virendra Ji Hegde
- 1996: Sant Saurabh
- 1996: [Co-edited] Samadhi Sadhna (Hamare Poojya Prerna Purush Sva. Pt. Jaganmohanlal ji shastri)
- 1997: Param Digambar Gomteshwar
- 1997: Ganesh Varni (Guruvar Shri Ganeshprasad Varni ka Sankshipt Jeevan-Parichay)
- 1999: Jain Monuments at Khajuraho (co-authored by Dashrath Jain) (2ed, Khajuraho Millennium Year 1999)
- 2000: 11ed, Karahta Kundalpur
- 2001: Samadhi Sadhna mein Sanlagn Poojya 105 Shri Aaryika Vishuddhmati Mataji
- 2001: Chandana ISBN 81-263-0706-4
- 2002: Barah Bhavna (Contemplation) ISBN 81-263-0757-9 (First paperback); 2003: 2ed
- 2003: Aatm Nivedan
- 2004: Charitra-Chakravarti Aacharya Shantisagar Ji Aur Bhattarak Parampara
- 2005: Jain Nagar ke Bahubali (Second Mahamastakabhishek Mahotsav, 18–21 March 2005)
- 2006: Saarthsk Assi
- 2007: Dharmasthala Bahubali
- 2008: Poojya 105 Shri Aaryika Vidhuddhmati Mataji
- 2010: Karman ki Gati Nyari
- Azadi ki dulhan
- Ahimsa ke Agradoot
- Bhagon ka bhoogol
- Chittor Darshan
- Navagarh
- Dharmasthal
- Varni Vandana
- Varni Vichar Vaibhav
- Na Asha na Akanksha
- Antim Patte ki Vidai
