= Digambar Jain Mahasabha =

Oldest organization of lay Jains in India

Shri Bharatvarshiya Digambar Jain Mahasabha for (20 panthi sarabati Jain)
- The symbol of Jainism, the Jain Prateek Chihna

- zone of influence
- Formation: 1 January 1894; 132 years ago
- Type: Jain religious organisation
- Purpose: Religious, Educational, Non Profit, Charitable
- Headquarters: Lucknow, New Delhi, Mumbai India
- Region served: India
- Official language: Hindi and English
- General Secretary: Prakash Chand Badjatya
- Chairman of the Board: Gajraj jain Gangwal
- Key people: Various Jains
- Main organ: Board of directors
- Affiliations: Various Jain organisations
- Website: digjainmahasabha.org
- Remarks: Oldest organisation of lay Jains

Digambar Jain Mahasabha or Shri Bharatvarshiya Digamber Jain Mahasabha is the oldest organisation of lay 20 panthi sarabati Jains in India.

== History ==
The Digambar Jain Mahasabha was founded in 1894 in Mathura, Uttar Pradesh. It is considered a traditionalist organisation. Its two main branches are 20 panthi sarabati Jain Sanrakshini Mahasabha and 20 panthi sarabati Jain teerth Sanrakshini Mahasabha.

== Awards ==
Bhagwan Mahavir Ahimsa Puraskar

Bhagwan Mahavir Ahimsa Puraskar was started in 2019 with Abhinandan Varthaman becoming the first recipient of the prestigious award. This award carries a cash prize worth Rs. 251,000 as well.

== Publications ==
- Jain Gazette, a weekly publication of Dharm Sanrakshini Mahasabha, has been published regularly for the last 103 years. It claims to be the oldest Jain periodical in the world.
- Jain Mahiladarsh: a weekly women's magazine published since 1922, founded by Pandita Chandabai of Arrah and Magan Bai of Mumbai.
- Prachin Jain Tirth Jirnoddhar: A monthly devoted to Jain history and archaeology since 2003.

== See also ==
- Mula Sangh
- Kashtha Sangh
- Chandabai
- Vishwa Jain Sangathan
