= Monica Mohan =

American artist

Monica Mohan is an American artist. Her work is included in the collections of the Whitney Museum of American Art and the Rhode Island School of Design Museum.
