= Chandabai =

Indian Jain scholar

- Born: 1880
- Died: 1977 (aged 96–97)

Pandita Brahmacharini Chandabai (1880–1977) was a Jain scholar and a pioneer of women's education in India. She was the founder of the oldest women's publication in India that is still published, Jain Mahiladarsh.

== Family ==
The daughter of Narayandas Agarwal of Vrindavan, Uttar Pradesh, a prominent citizen and a proponent of Indian's independence, she was married at the age of 11 to Dharmakumar, the 18-year-old grandson of the zamindar and scholar Prabhudas Jain of Arrah. Dharmakumar died the next year. His older brother, Devkumar Jain, himself a Jain scholar, encourage Chandabai to study, which was uncommon in that period.

== Overview ==
Chandabai studied the classical subjects including Sanskrit, Prakrit, dharmaśāstra, nyāya (logic), literature and grammar. She earned the title "pandita" from Kashi. She was a good orator, she gave her first speech at Panipat during a Panch-kalyanak Pratishtha at the age of 17.

She established a school for girls in 1907, which came to be known as the Jain Balasharm in 1921. Dr. Nemichandra Jyotishacharya, who later emerged as a major Jain scholar, was appointed by her to be the director of the Balasharm in 1939. During the interview, she asked him questions on Sanskrit and Prakrit texts such as Devagama Stotra, Atmanushasana, and Gommatsar Jivakanda.

She often herself served sick students at the Balashrama. She nursed a girl sick with typhoid in 1943, who eventually got better and later earned the Nyayatirtha degree.

== Magazines ==
She started a magazine, Jain Mahiladarsh, in 1921 and edited it for many years. She wrote several books including Updesh Ratna Mala, Saubhagya Ratna Mala, Nibandh Ratna Mala, Adarsh Kahaniyan, Adarsh Nibandh, and Nibandh Darpan.

== See also ==
- Jainism
- Digambar Jain Mahasabha
- Jainism in Uttar Pradesh
