= S. Suresh Babu =

Indian atmospheric scientist

- Born: 14 March 1976 (age 50); Kerala, India
- Education: University College Thiruvananthapuram; University of Kerala
- Known for: Studies on Atmospheric aerosols
- Awards: 2006 INSA Young Scientist Award; 2009 NASI Young Scientist Platinum Jubilee Award; 2009 NASI-SCOPUS Young Scientist Award; 2017 Shanti Swarup Bhatnagar Prize
- Scientific career
- Fields: Atmospheric science
- Workplaces: Vikram Sarabhai Space Centre

S. Suresh Babu (born 14 March 1976) is an Indian atmospheric scientist and the head of the Aerosols, Trace gases and Radiative Forcing (ATRF) branch at the Space Physics Laboratory of Vikram Sarabhai Space Centre. Known for his studies on the Atmospheric aerosols, Babu is a recipient of the Young Scientist or Associate Award of all the three major Indian science academies namely, National Academy of Sciences, India, Indian Academy of Sciences and Indian National Science Academy. The Council of Scientific and Industrial Research, the apex agency of the Government of India for scientific research, awarded him the Shanti Swarup Bhatnagar Prize for Science and Technology, one of the highest Indian science awards, for his contributions to Earth, Atmosphere, Ocean and Planetary Sciences in 2017. (Note: Long link - please select award year to see details)

== Biography ==
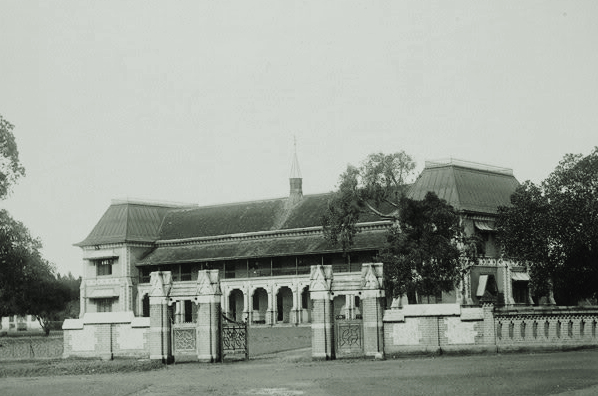
Kerala University in 1940s

Babu was born on 14 March 1976 in the south Indian state of Kerala. His undergraduate studies were at the University College Thiruvananthapuram of the University of Kerala from where he earned an MSc in physics in 1998 before continuing at the institution to obtain an MPhil in 2000. Enrolling at the same university for his doctoral studies, he did his research at Vikram Sarabhai Space Centre (VSSC) to secure a PhD in 2005. Subsequently, he joined the Space Physics Laboratory of VSSC where he heads the Aerosols Trace gases and Radiative Forcing (ATRF) branch holding the position of a scientist grade SG.

== Legacy ==
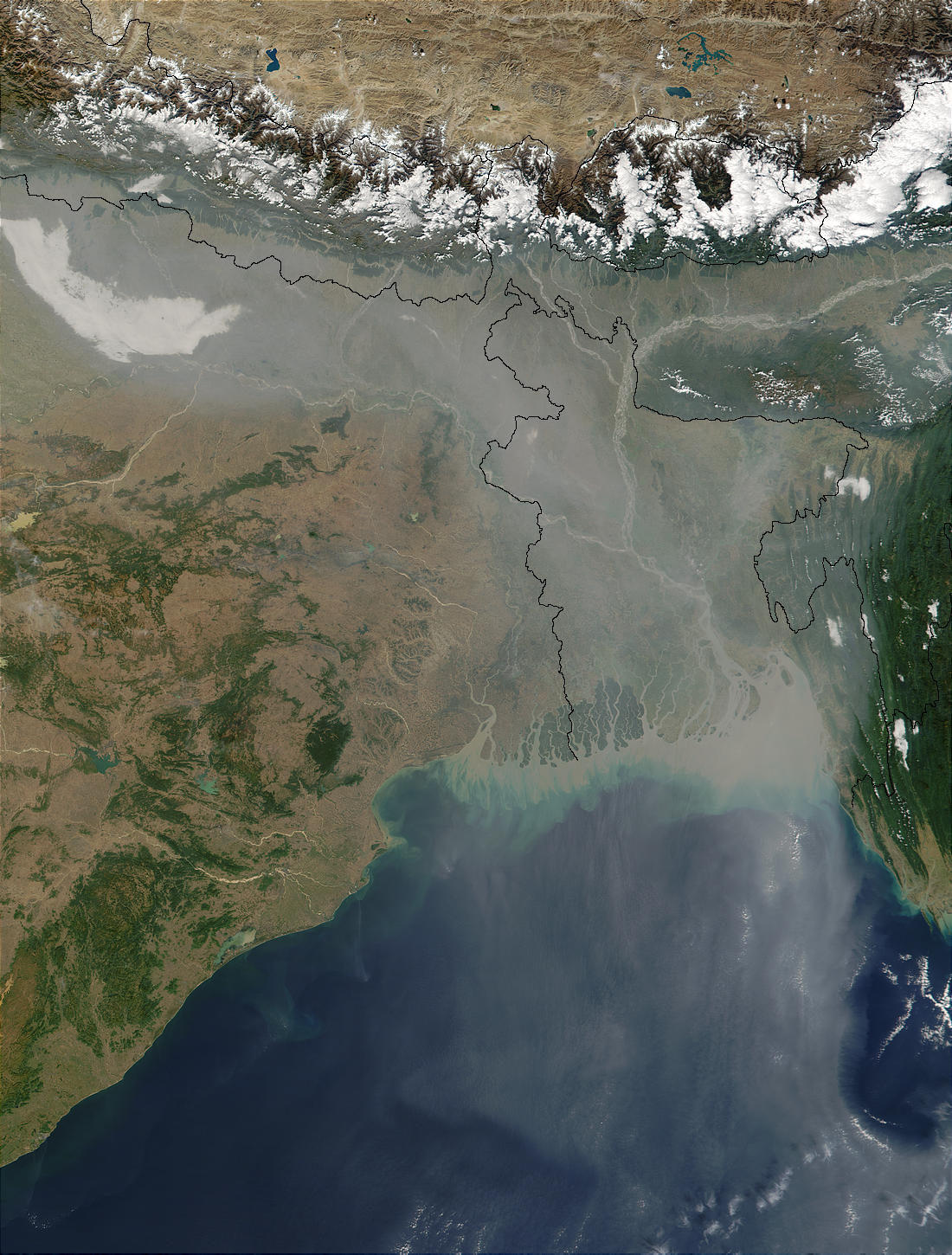
Aerosol pollution over Northern India and Bangladesh

Babu's research has been focused primarily on atmospheric aerosols and his works is reported to have assisted in a wider understanding of black carbon aerosols and their radiative impacts on climate changes and atmospheric stability. His studies have been documented by way of a number of articles (Note: Please see Selected bibliography section) and ResearchGate, an online article repository of scientific articles, has listed 169 of them. Besides, he has contributed chapters to three books published by others and has edited thirty two proceedings. The invited talks delivered by him include the one on Atmospheric aerosols and their characterization over the Arctic at the 2013 Joint Workshop on Polar Research jointly organized by the Ministry of Earth Sciences, National Centre for Antarctic and Ocean Research and Norwegian Research Council.

When the Ministry of Earth Sciences constituted the National Facility for Airborne Research (NFAR) under the leadership of the then director of the Indian Institute of Tropical Meteorology in 2013, Babu was selected as a member of the technical expert committee. He has served as the resource person for INSPIRE internship programs of the Department of Science and Technology and as the reviewer of proposals for the funding programs of Ministry of Earth Sciences, Department of Science and Technology and Council of Scientific and Industrial Research. He is also an incumbent or former member of several government and institutional committees such as steering review committee of the Space Borne Lidar Project of VSSC, technical evaluation committee of CAIPEEX Program of the Indian Institute of Tropical Meteorology, critical design review committee of NEMO-AM satellites of Space Applications Centre, expert committee for the project report preparation of Environmental monitoring satellite of Indian Space Research Organization and the national committee for the procurement of scientific instruments in C-130J atmospheric research aircraft. He has also been an institutional member of two of VSSC research programs namely Investigations of atmospheric aerosols and their characterization over the Arctic during summer season which ended in 2012 and Characterization of Polar Aerosols: Source processes and climate impacts, which is scheduled to end in 2018.

== Awards and honors ==
Babu received the Young Scientist Award of the Indian National Science Academy in 2006 and a year later, the Indian Academy of Sciences chose him as their Young Associate. He was selected for the Young Scientist Platinum Jubilee Award of the National Academy of Sciences, India in 2009; he received another honor the same year in the form of NASI-SCOPUS Young Scientist Award from Elsevier. When the Indian National Science Academy established Indian National Young Academy of Science (INYAS) in 2015, he was elected as one of the founding members of the academy. In 2015, he was also selected for the Swarna Jayanti Fellowship of Department of Science and Technology, the tenure of the fellowship running until 2020. (Note: List available as separate downloadable link) The Council of Scientific and Industrial Research awarded him the Shanti Swarup Bhatnagar Prize, one of the highest Indian science awards in 2017. In 2018, Babu became a laureate of the Asian Scientist 100 by the Asian Scientist.

== Selected bibliography ==
- S. Suresh Babu (2017). "Aerosol Studies on and Around Antarctica". Proc Indian Natl Sci Acad. 83 (2): 441–447. doi:10.16943/ptinsa/2017/48952.
- Suresh Babu, M. R. Manoj, K. Krishna Moorthy, Mukunda M. Gogoi, Vijayakumar S. Nair, Sobhan Kumar Kompalli, S. K. Satheesh, K. Niranjan, K. Ramagopal, P. K. Bhuyan, Darshan Singh (2013). "Trends in aerosol optical depth over Indian region: Potential causes and impact indicators". Journal of Geophysical Research: Atmospheres. 118 (20): 11794–11806. Bibcode:2013JGRD..11811794B. doi:10.1002/2013JD020507. S2CID 128498902.
- Krishna Moorthy, S. Suresh Babu, S. K. Satheesh, J. Srinivasan, C. B. S. Dutt (2007). "Dust absorption over the "Great Indian Desert" inferred using ground-based and satellite remote sensing". Journal of Geophysical Research. 112 (D9): D09206. Bibcode:2007JGRD..112.9206M. doi:10.1029/2006JD007690.

== See also ==
- Particulates
- Deposition (aerosol physics)
- Acid rain
- Atmosphere of Earth
