= Kasayapahuda =

Canonical text of the Digambara Jains

Kāsāyapahuḍa
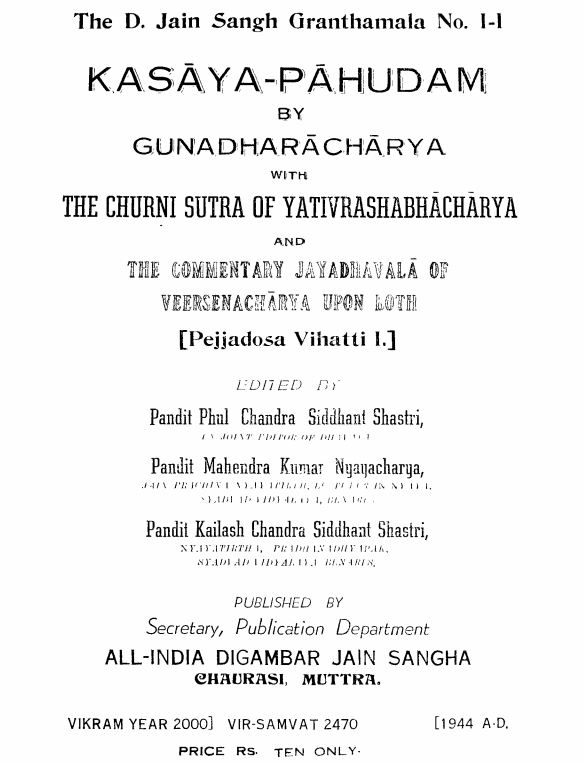
- Kāsāyapahuḍam

Information
- Religion: Jainism
- Author: Gunabhadra
- Language: Prakrit
- Period: 1st century AD

Kasayapahuda (Kāsāyapahuḍa) (also Kasayaprabhrta) is one of the oldest canonical texts of the Digambara Jains. Another canonical text, the Shatkhandagama was written about the same time. Both these texts are held in high esteem by the Digambaras. Kasaya (passions) form the subject matter of Kasayapahuda.

== Author ==
Kasayapahuda was written by Acharya Gunabhadra in the 1st century A.D.

== Content ==
Kasayapahuda discusses the Jain doctrine of Karma. The Kasayapahuda is written in verses only.
