= P. Chandra Mohan =

Indian politician

P. Chandra Mohan is an Indian politician who is the chairman of the Gurudeva Trust, Erickavu. He is also the Kerala State Vice President of Human Rights Protection Mission.

He had participated in the Kerala Panchayath Election - Local Body Election 2015 for UDF party at Kumarapuram Panchayath in Alappuzha district and has been elected as Member of Panchayath of ward 13 of Kumarapuram.
