= Mahan (name) =

Mahan is both a surname and a given name.

When used as given name in Persian (ماهان māhān), it means "like the moon" or "moon-like", or even referring to something "as beautiful as the moon".

Notable people with the name include:

== Given name ==
- Mahan Singh, Chief of the Sukerchakia Misl of the Sikh Confederacy
- Mahan Mitra (born 1968), Indian mathematician
- Mahan Esfahani (born 1984), Iranian-American harpsichordist

== Surname ==
- Alex Mahan (born 1988), American video game developer
- Alfred Thayer Mahan (1840–1914), American officer, geostrategist, and naval historian
- Armand Mahan (born 1983), Ivorian football player
- Art Mahan (1913–2010), American baseball player
- Asa Mahan (1800–1889), first president of Oberlin College
- Dennis Hart Mahan (1802–1871), professor at the US Military Academy, father of Alfred
- Eddie Mahan (1892–1975), American football player
- Hunter Mahan (born 1981), American golfer
- Larry Mahan (1943–2023), eight time rodeo world champion
- Matt Mahan (born 1982), American politician, mayor of San Jose, California
- Sean Mahan (born 1980), American football player
- Virginia Mahan (1949–2023), American politician
- William Dennes Mahan (1824–1906), Presbyterian minister and author of The Archko Volume
