= Mohan Sivanand =

Indian journalist and artist

Mohan Raj Sivanand
- Born: Mohan Raj Sivanand

Mohan Sivanand is an Indian journalist and artist. For a decade, until October 2015, he was editor-in-chief of the Indian edition of Reader's Digest, India's largest-selling magazine in English until his retirement that month.
