= Nanauta =

Town in Saharanpur district, Uttar Pradesh, India

- Town
- Location in Uttar Pradesh, India Nanauta (India)
- Coordinates: 29°42′46″N 77°25′03″E
- Country: India
- State: Uttar Pradesh
- District: Saharanpur
- Elevation: 255 m (837 ft)

Population (2011)
  - Total: 22,551

Languages
  - Official: Hindi
- Time zone: UTC+5:30 (IST)
- Postal code: 247452
- Vehicle registration: UP
- Website: up.gov.in

Nanauta is a town and a nagar panchayat (municipality) in Saharanpur district in the Indian state of Uttar Pradesh. Nanauta is located on Saharanpur Delhi Highway. It is 32 km (20 mi) from Saharanpur city. It is 35 km (22 mi) from Shamli towards Saharanpur on the Delhi–Saharanpur Road. The town is famous for its street food available in the Central Market and Clothes Market.

Nanauta is also the birthplace of the famous Muslim Scholar Mawlana Qasim Nanautwi who was the founder of the largest Islamic Seminary in India, Dārul Ulūm Deoband. The family of the Siddiqi family

== Demographics ==
As of 2011, the Indian census recorded the population of Nanauta as 22,551. Males constitute 52.53% of the population and females 47.46%. Nanauta has an average literacy rate of 68.26%, lower than the national average of 74.04%: male literacy is 75.84%, and female literacy is 59.9%. In Nanauta, 14.51% of the population is under 6 years of age. Nanauta and the adjoining villages are home to the Ror and Rajput communities.

== Education ==
- Imam Bargah Sayyed Asad Ali Chatta
- Chander Sain Convent Academy
- Gurudwara Girls School
- Kisan Sewak Inter College
- Harsh Modern Public School
- BSM Degree College
- BSM Global School
- Hukum Singh Girls Degree College
- Green Field Academy
- Bright Home Public School
- Government Degree College (Rajkiya Mahavidhyalya)
- Radiant Public School
- Holy Home Public School

== See also ==
- Siddiqi family of Nanauta
- Nanautawi
