= Thirupanamur Jain Temple =

Jain temple in Tamil Nadu, India

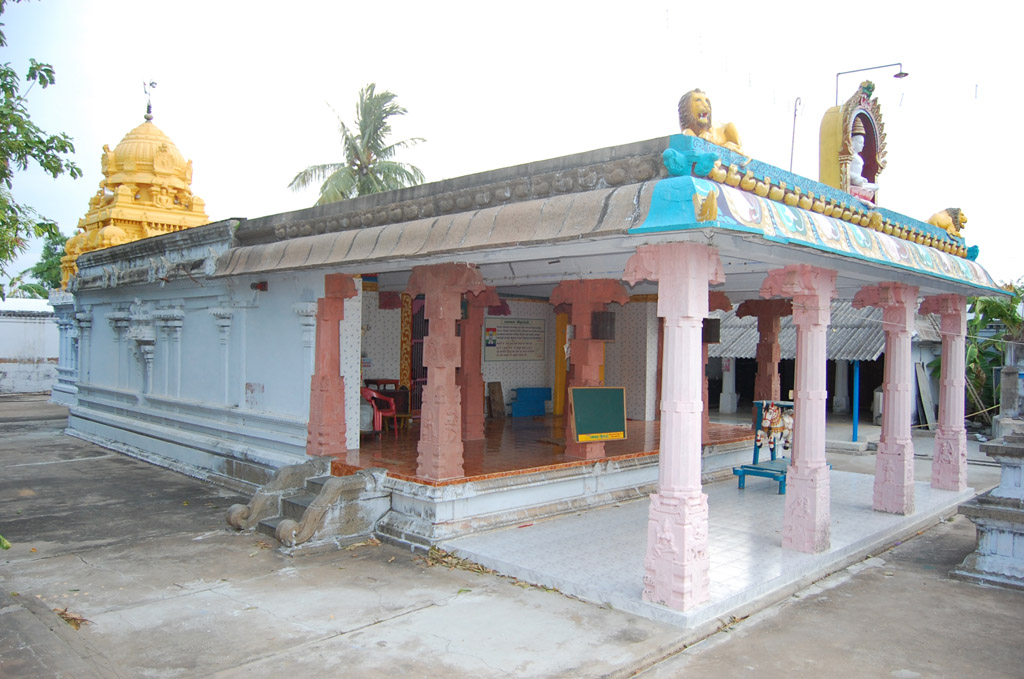

Religion
- Affiliation: Jainism
- Sect: Digambara
- Deity: Pushpadanta

Location
- Location: Thirupanamur, Tiruvannamalai

Thirupanamur Jain Temple is a Digambara Jain temple at Thirupanamur (Tiruppaṇamūr) in Tiruvannamalai district, Tamil Nadu, India. Thirupanamur is an old Jain settlement situated near Karanthai and is associated in Tamil Jain tradition with the Jain philosopher Akalanka.

== History ==
Thirupanamur and neighbouring Karanthai are historic Jain centres in Tamil Nadu. The site records the survival of traditions of the Jain philosopher and logician Akalanka. The site also preserves a stone mortar at the temple which was traditionally associated with Akalanka. The traditions remained particularly strong among the Jain community of Thirupanamur.

A sculpture on the compound wall opposite the mortar depicts a Akalanka in a lotus position. The traditions of Thirupanamur are closely connected with those of neighboring Karanthai. Modern scholarship refers to Tiruppaṇamūr and Karandai as twin Jain villages and records the continued preservation of traditions concerning Akalanka among the Tamil Jain community of the area.

== Jain heritage of Thirupanamur ==
Thirupanamur is one of the important historic Jain settlement in Tamil Nadu. Jain communities and monuments are concentrated around Kanchipuram, Vandavasi, Tiruvannamalai and Villupuram.

Thirupanamur is identified as historic Jain village and recorded the continuing religious traditions associated with its Jain temple. The close historical and religious relationship between Thirupanamur and Karanthai has continued into the modern period.

== See also ==
- Akalanka
- Karanthai Jain Temple
- Trilokyanatha Temple
- Vijayamangalam Jain temple
