= Vijayamangalam Jain temple =

Jain temples in the state of Tamil Nadu

- ஸ்ரீ 1008 பகவான் சந்திரபிரபு சுவாமி திகம்பர் ஜெயின் கோவில்
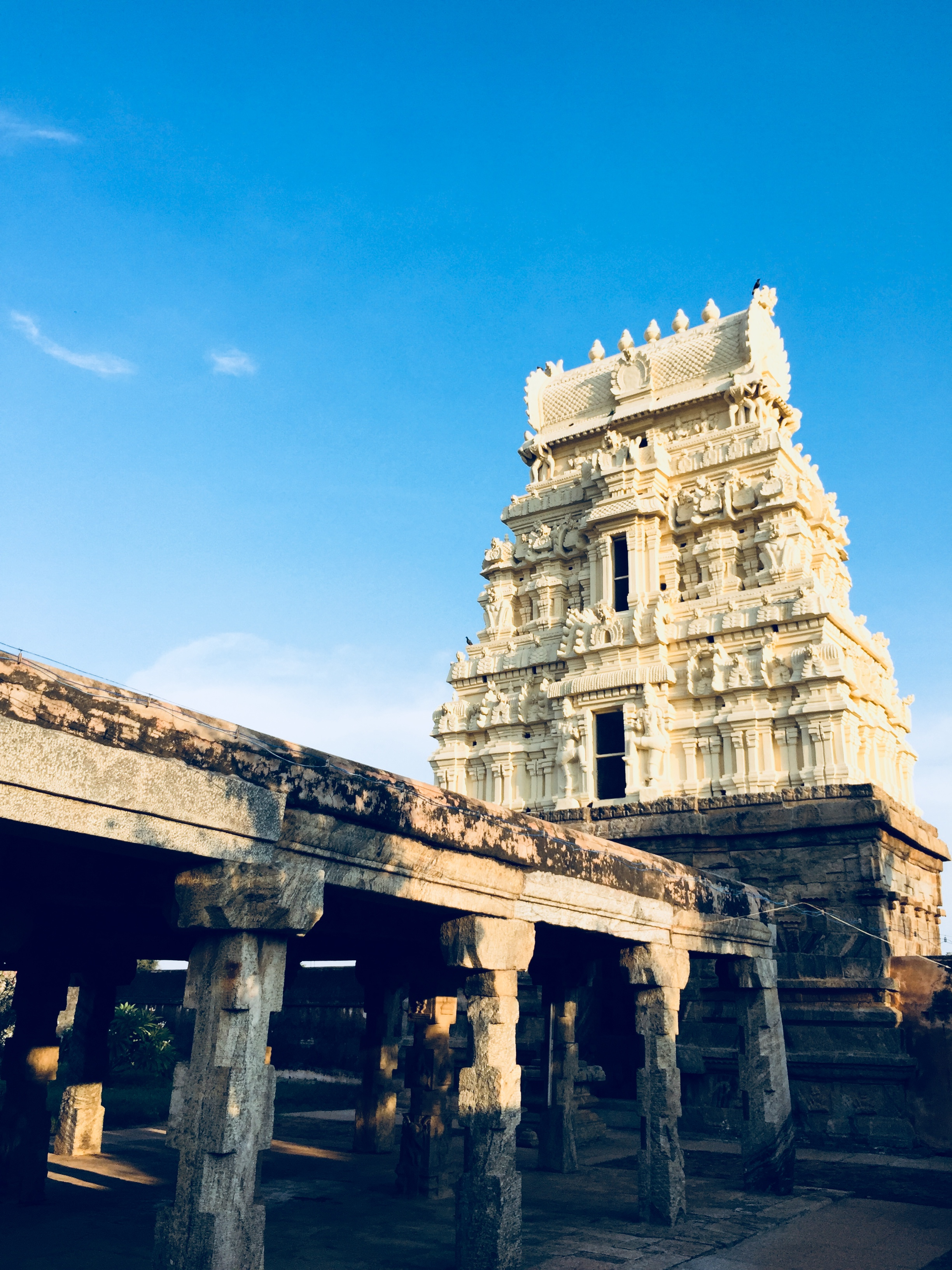
- Shri 1008 Bhagavan Chandraprabhu Swami Digambar Jain Temple

Religion
- Affiliation: Jainism
- Deity: Chandraprabha
- Festival: Mahavir Jayanti
- Governing body: Sri Chandraprabhu Digamber Jain Mandir Bastipuram

Location
- Location: Vijayamangalam, Erode, Tamil Nadu
- Interactive map of Vijayamangalam Jain temple
- Coordinates: 11°14′58″N 77°30′10.5″E

Architecture
- Style: Western Ganga architecture
- Creator: King Konguvelir
- Established: 678 C.E.
- Temple: 1

Vijayamangalam Jain temple also known as Chandrapraba Tirtankarar Temple is a Jain temple in the town of Vijayamangalam in Erode district, Tamil Nadu.

== History ==
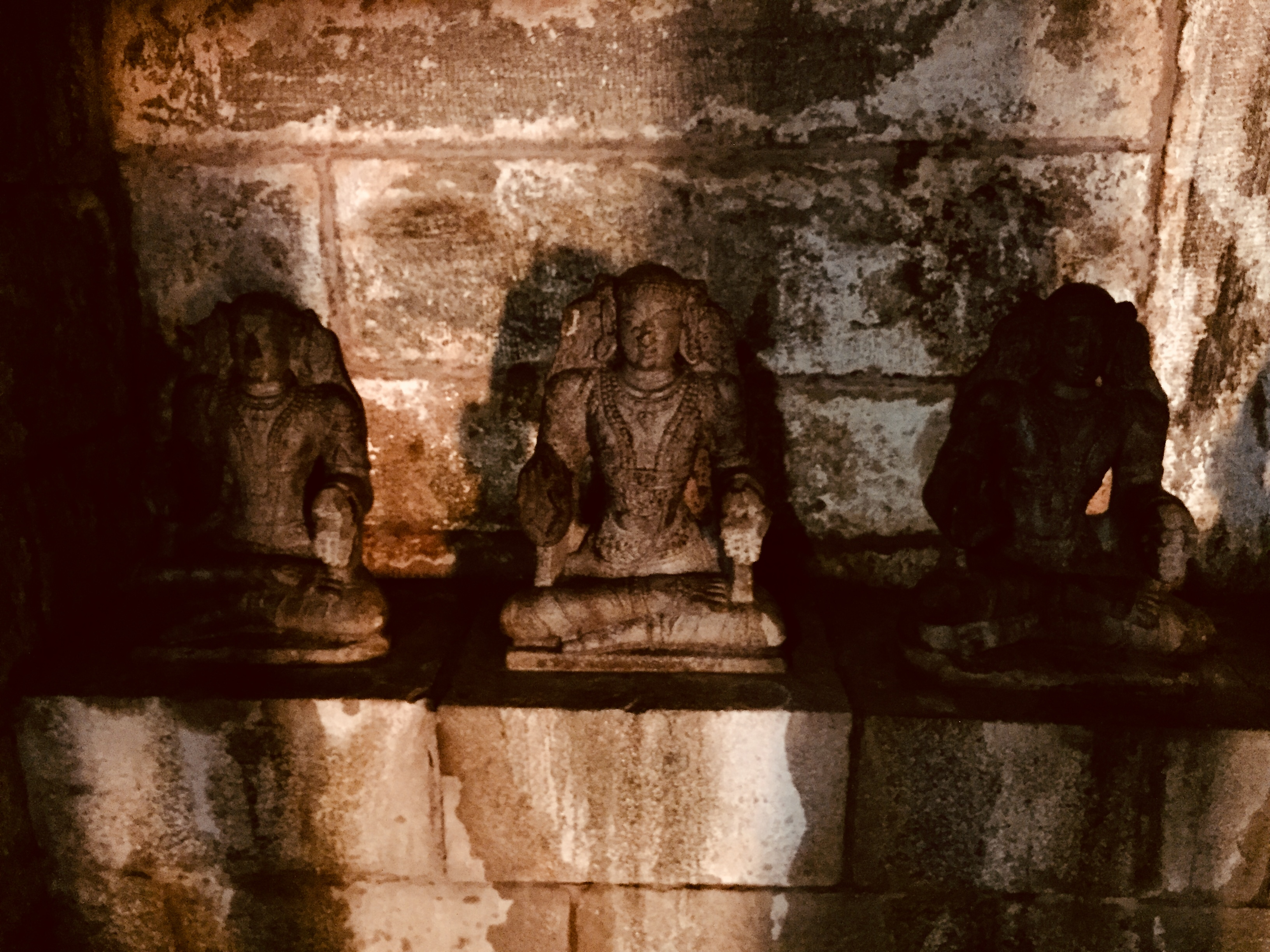
Idols of King Konguvelir, his maid and the members of the Tamil Sangam

Vijayamangalam, historically part of Kongu Nadu, was an ancient settlement of Jains. Vijayamangalam Jain temple was built in c. 678 C.E. by King Konguvelir of Velir dynasty. King Konguvelir composed an epic Perunkathai, one of the Tamil Pancha-Kaviyams here. Tamil Sangam (assembly of Tamil scholars and poets) was organised here when Konguvelir composed Perunkathai. During the sangam King's maid helped him to answer the questions of scholarly Sangam. To commemorate this event the idols of King Konguvelir, his maid and the members of the Tamil Sangam were installed inside the temple.

There is an inscription inside the temple that talks of the beauty of Perunkathai. The Vijayamangalam village is also the birthplace of a 12th-century Jain acharya Bhavanandi, who authored Nannūl, a noteable Tamil grammar work. This temple is the oldest Jain temple in the Kongu Nadu region. The survival of stone inscriptions at the temple provides further evidence of its historical importance. Paintings and a collection of stone and bronze Jain images are also preserved at the monument.

Pullava, sister of Chavundaraya, observed sallekhana or fasting to death here.

== Architecture ==
This temple is dedicated to Chandraprabha, the eighth Tirthankara of Jainism. The temple follows Western Ganga architecture with brick Vimana facing south and ardhamandapa housing idols of Pañca-Parameṣṭhi. The temple is enclosed within a prakaram entered through a gopuram. The temple follows Gangas and the Cholas architecture.

The temple remains a functioning Jain religious monument despite its status as a protected archaeological site.

== Sculpture and iconography ==
The temple preserves an extensive collection of Jain sculpture with Twenty-four stone Tirthankara images among the principal sculpture. The temple also enshrines yakshi, Dharmadevi and Kushpanini sculptures. A particularly extensive sculptural programme occurs on the inner ceiling, where approximately 130 relief sculptures depict episodes from the life of Rishabhanatha. The temple also preserves bronze images of Rishabhanatha, Anantanatha, Neminatha and Mahavira. Paintings and stone inscriptions have also been recorded within the temple. Many Jain idols dating back to uncertain times having reported in Vijayamangalam.

== Protection ==
The temple is maintained and protected by the Archaeological Survey of India. The main idol alongwith many have been burgled in the recent past.

== Photo gallery ==
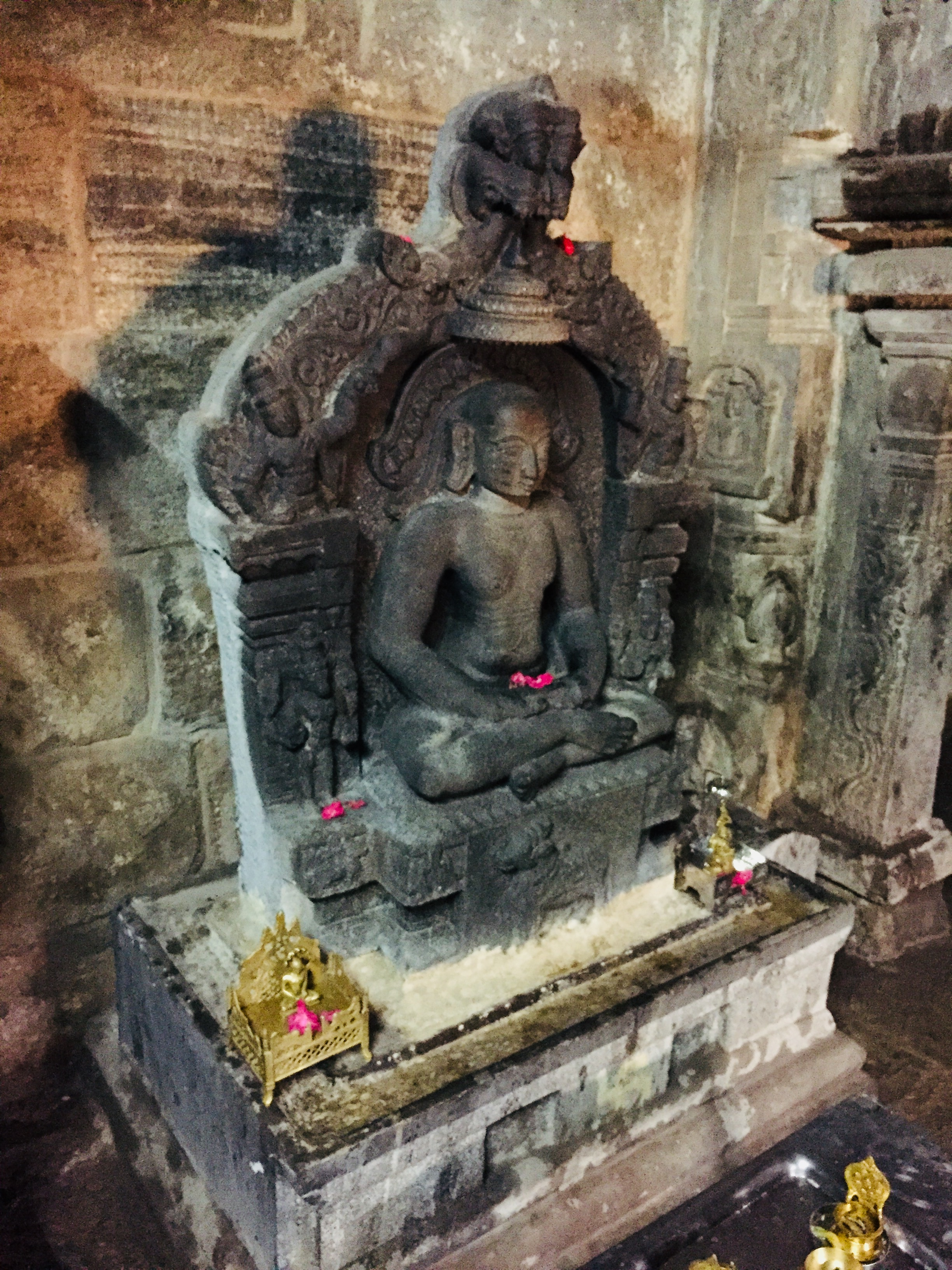
Rishabhanatha idol

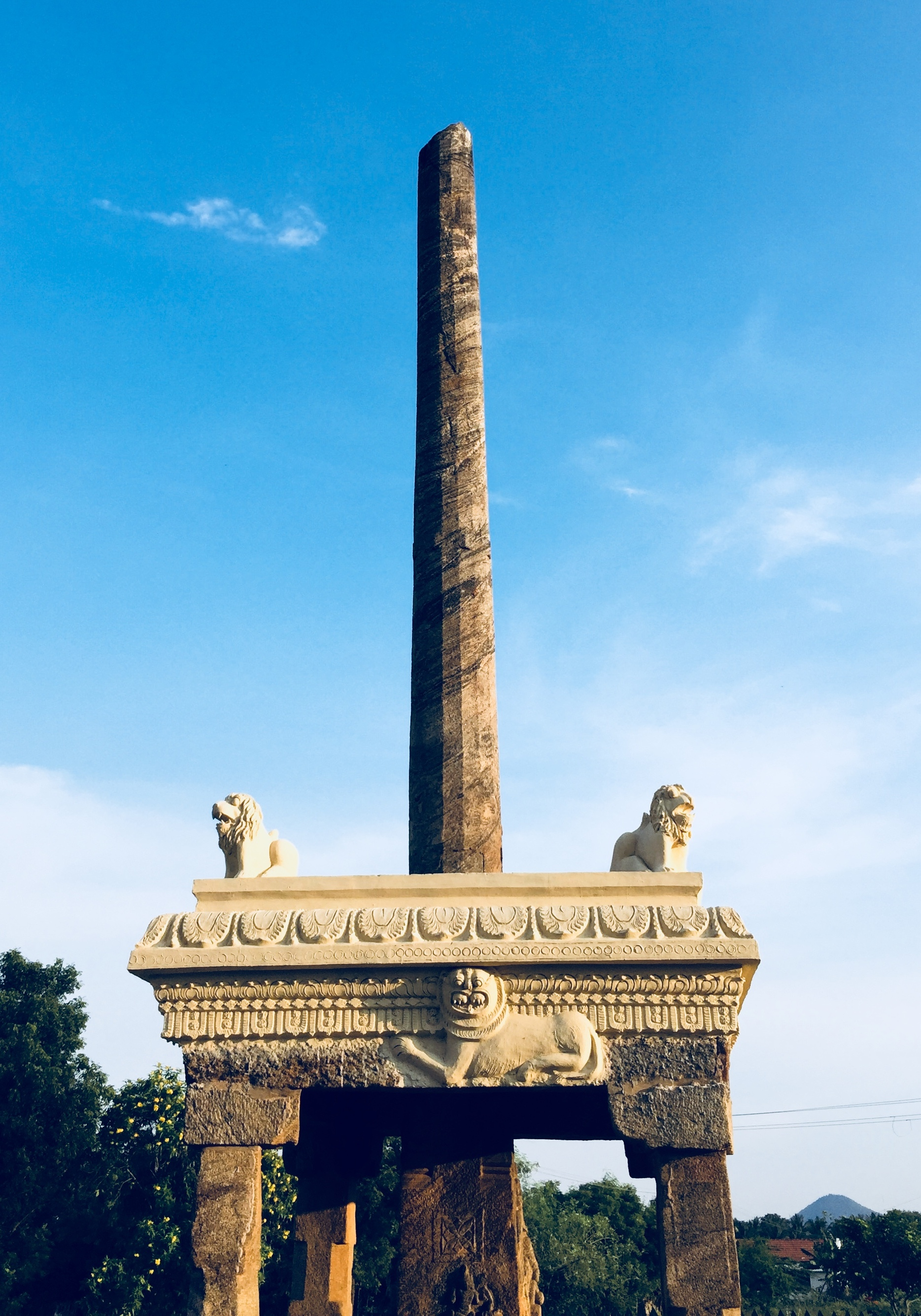
Manastambha

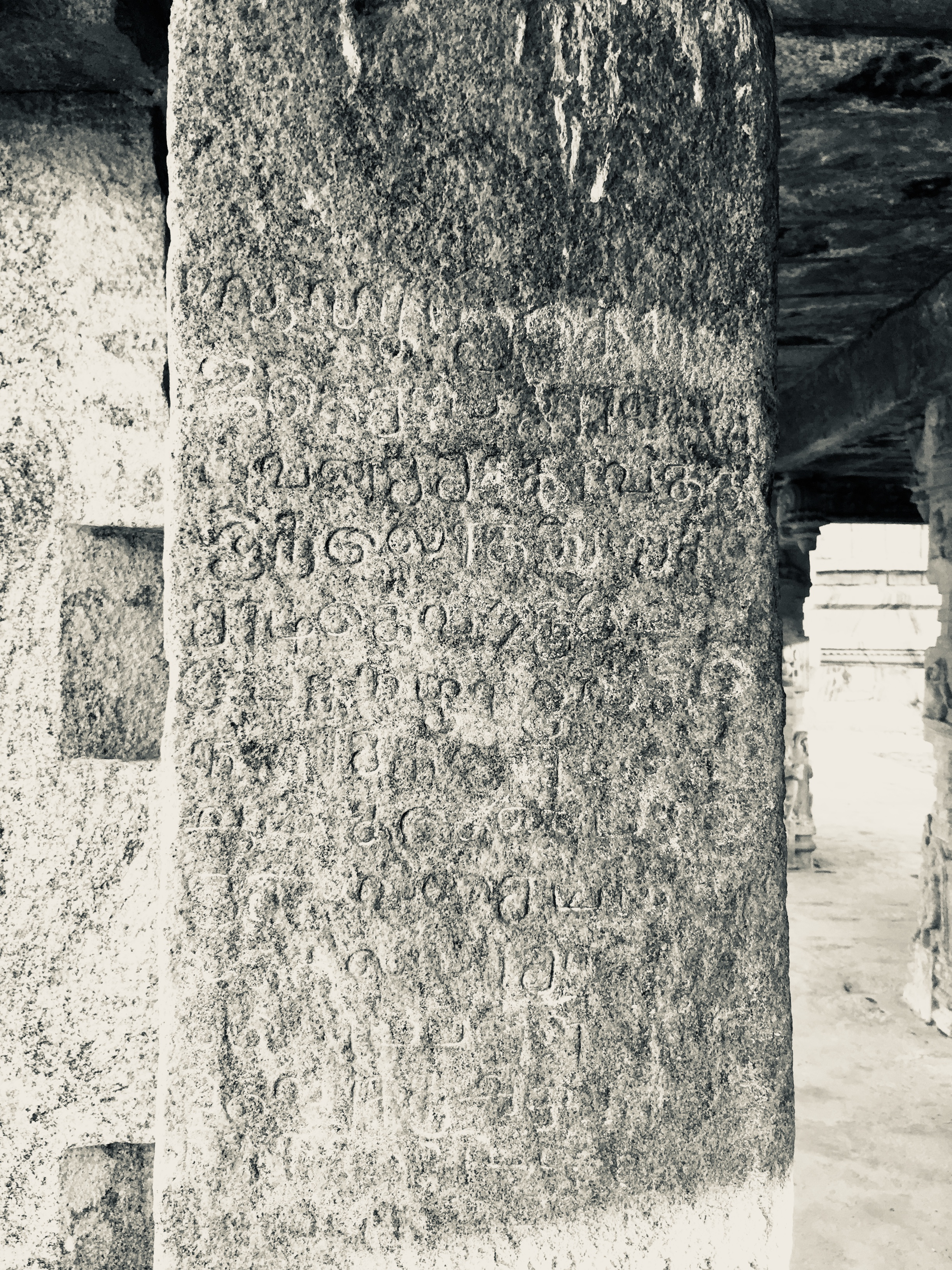
Inscription

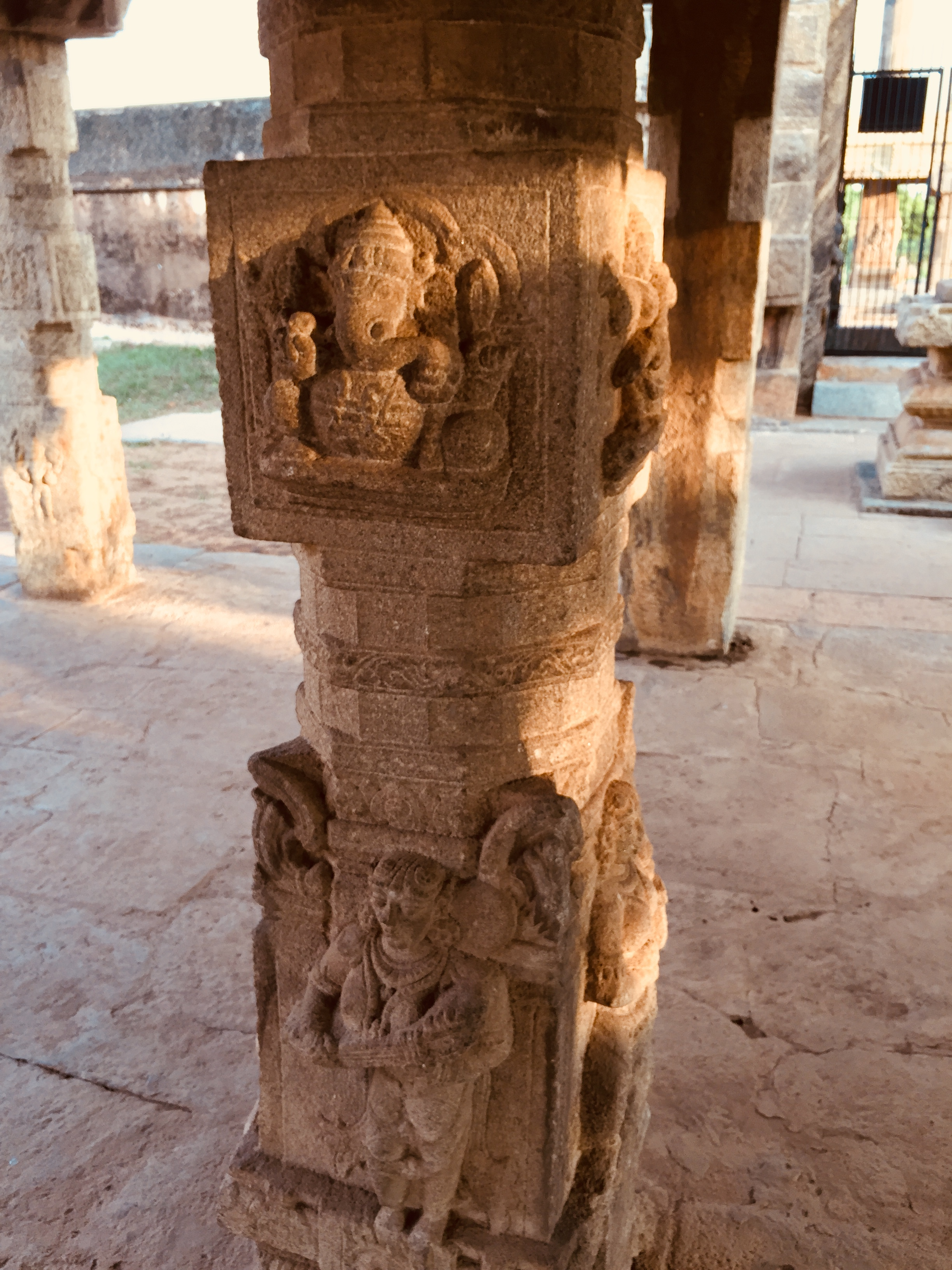
Detailed carvings on the pillar

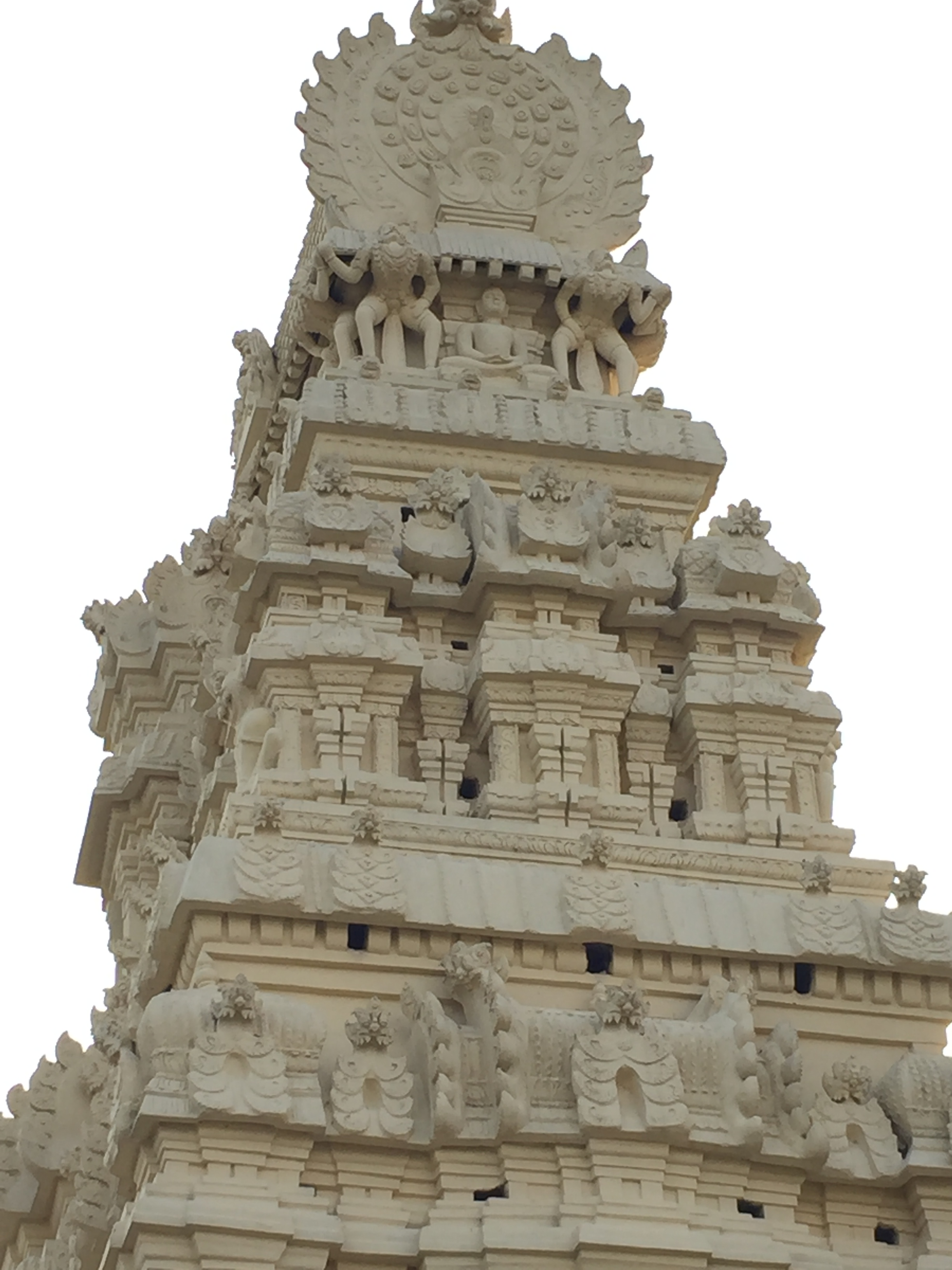
Vimana

== See also ==
- Trilokyanatha Temple
- Nannūl
- Cīvaka Cintāmaṇi
