= Devasena (disambiguation) =

Devasena is the name of a Hindu goddess.

Devasena may also refer to these in ancient India:

- Devasena (Jain monk)
- Devasena (Vakataka king)

Others

- Devasena (character), a fictional character in the Indian Baahubali franchise
- Devsena, titular character of the Indian TV series Aarambh: Kahaani Devsena Ki
