= Sallekhana =

Voluntarily fasting to death in Jainism

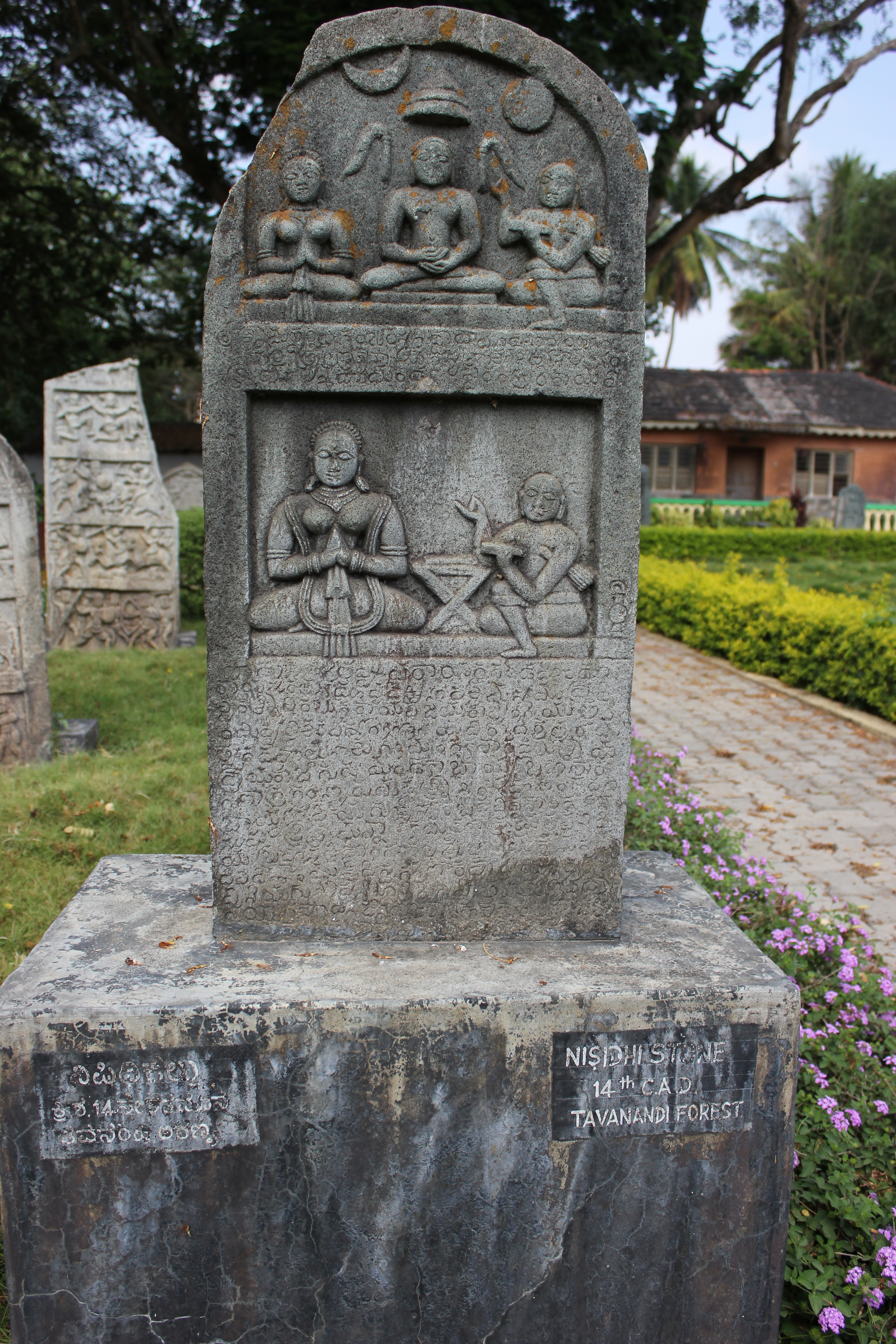
Nishidhi, a 14th-century memorial stone depicting the observance of the vow of Sallekhana with old Kannada inscription. Found at Tavanandi forest, Karnataka, India.

Sallekhana (IAST: sallekhanā), also known as samlehna, santhara, samadhi-marana or sanyasana-marana, is a supplementary vow to the ethical code of conduct of Jainism. It is the religious practice of voluntarily fasting to death by gradually reducing the intake of food and liquids. It is viewed in Jainism as the thinning of human passions and the body, and another means of destroying rebirth-influencing karma by withdrawing all physical and mental activities. It is not considered a suicide by Jain scholars because it is not an act of passion, nor does it employ poisons or weapons. After the sallekhana vow, the ritual preparation and practice can extend into years.

Sallekhana is a vow available to both Jain ascetics and householders. Historic evidence such as nishidhi engravings suggest sallekhana was observed by both men and women, including queens, in Jain history. However, in the modern era, death through sallekhana has been a relatively uncommon event. There is debate about the practice from a right to life vs right to die and a freedom of religion viewpoint. In 2015, the Rajasthan High Court banned the practice, considering it suicide. In 2016, the Supreme Court of India stayed the decision of the Rajasthan High Court and lifted the ban on sallekhana.

== Vow ==
There are five great vows prescribed to followers of Jainism; ahimsa (non-violence), satya (not lying), asteya (not stealing), brahmacharya (chastity), and aparigraha (non-possession). A further seven supplementary vows are also prescribed, which include three gunavratas (merit vows) and four shikshavratas (disciplinary vows). The three Gunavratas are: Digvrata (limited movements, limiting one's area of activity), bhogopabhogaparimana (limiting the use of consumable and non-consumable things), and anartha-dandaviramana (abstain from purposeless sins). The shikshavratas include: samayika (vow to meditate and concentrate for limited periods), desavrata (limiting movement and space of activity for limited periods), prosadhopavāsa (fasting for limited periods), and atithi-samvibhag (offering food to the ascetic).

Sallekhana is treated as a supplementary to these twelve vows. However, some Jain teachers such as Kundakunda, Devasena, Padmanandin, and Vasunandin have included it under shikshavratas.

Sallekhana means to properly 'thin out', 'scour out', or 'slender' the passions and the body through gradually abstaining from food and drink. Sallekhana is divided into two components: kashaya sallekhana (slendering of passions) or abhayantra sallekhana (internal slendering) and kaya sallekhana (slendering the body) or bahya sallekhana (external slendering). It is described as "facing death voluntarily through fasting". According to Jain texts, sallekhana leads to ahimsa (non-violence or non-injury), as a person observing sallekhana subjugates the passions, which are the root cause of himsa (injury or violence).

== Conditions ==
Sallekhana as expounded in the Jain text, Ratnakaranda śrāvakācāra

While Sallekhana is prescribed for both householders and ascetics, Jain texts describe conditions when it is appropriate. It should not be observed by a householder without the guidance of a Jain ascetic.

Sallekhana is always voluntary, undertaken after the public declaration, and never assisted with any chemicals or tools. Fasting causes weight loss due to malnutrition. As death is imminent, the individual discontinues food and water, with full knowledge of colleagues and spiritual counsellor. In some cases, Jains with terminal illness undertake sallekhana, and in these cases, they ask for permission from their spiritual counsellor. (Note: According to Somasundaram, Sallekhana is allowed in Jainism when normal religious life is not possible because of old age, extreme calamities, famine, incurable disease or when a person is nearing their death.) For a successful sallekhana, the death must be with "pure means", voluntary, planned, undertaken with calmness, peace, and joy by which the person accepts the ultimate purification of the body and focuses the mind on spiritual matters.

Sallekhana differs from other forms of ritual deaths recognized in Jainism as appropriate. The other situations consider ritual death preferable to a mendicant breaking their Five Great vows (Mahavrata). For example, celibacy is one of the Five vows, and ritual death is considered better than being raped or seduced or if the mendicant community would be defamed. A ritual death under these circumstances by consuming poison is believed to be better, and thus allows for an auspicious rebirth.

== Procedure ==
The duration of the practice can vary from a few days to years. The sixth part of the Ratnakaranda śrāvakācāra describes Sallekhana and its procedure as follows:

Giving up solid food by degrees, one should take to milk and whey, then giving them up, to hot or spiced water. [Subsequently] giving up hot water also, and observing fasting with full determination, he should give up his body, trying in every possible way to keep in mind the pancha-namaskara mantra.

— Ratnakaranda śrāvakācāra (127–128)

Jain texts mention five transgressions (Atichara) of the vow: the desire to be reborn as a human, the desire to be reborn as a divinity, the desire to continue living, the desire to die quickly, and the desire to live a sensual life in the next life. Other transgressions include: recollection of affection for friends, recollection of the pleasures enjoyed, and longing for the enjoyment of pleasures in the future.

The ancient Śvetāmbara Jain text Ācārāṅga Sūtra, dated to about 3rd or 2nd century BCE, describes three forms of Sallekhana: the Bhaktapratyakhyana, the Ingita-marana, and the Padapopagamana. In Bhaktapratyakhyana, the person who wants to observe the vow selects an isolated place where he lies on a bed made of straw, does not move his limbs, and avoids food and drink until he dies. In Ingita-marana, the person sleeps on bare ground. He can sit, stand, walk, or move, but avoids food until he dies. In Padapopagamana, a person stands "like a tree" without food and drink until he dies.

Another variation of Sallekhana is Itvara which consists of voluntarily restricting oneself in a limited space and then fasting to death.

== History ==
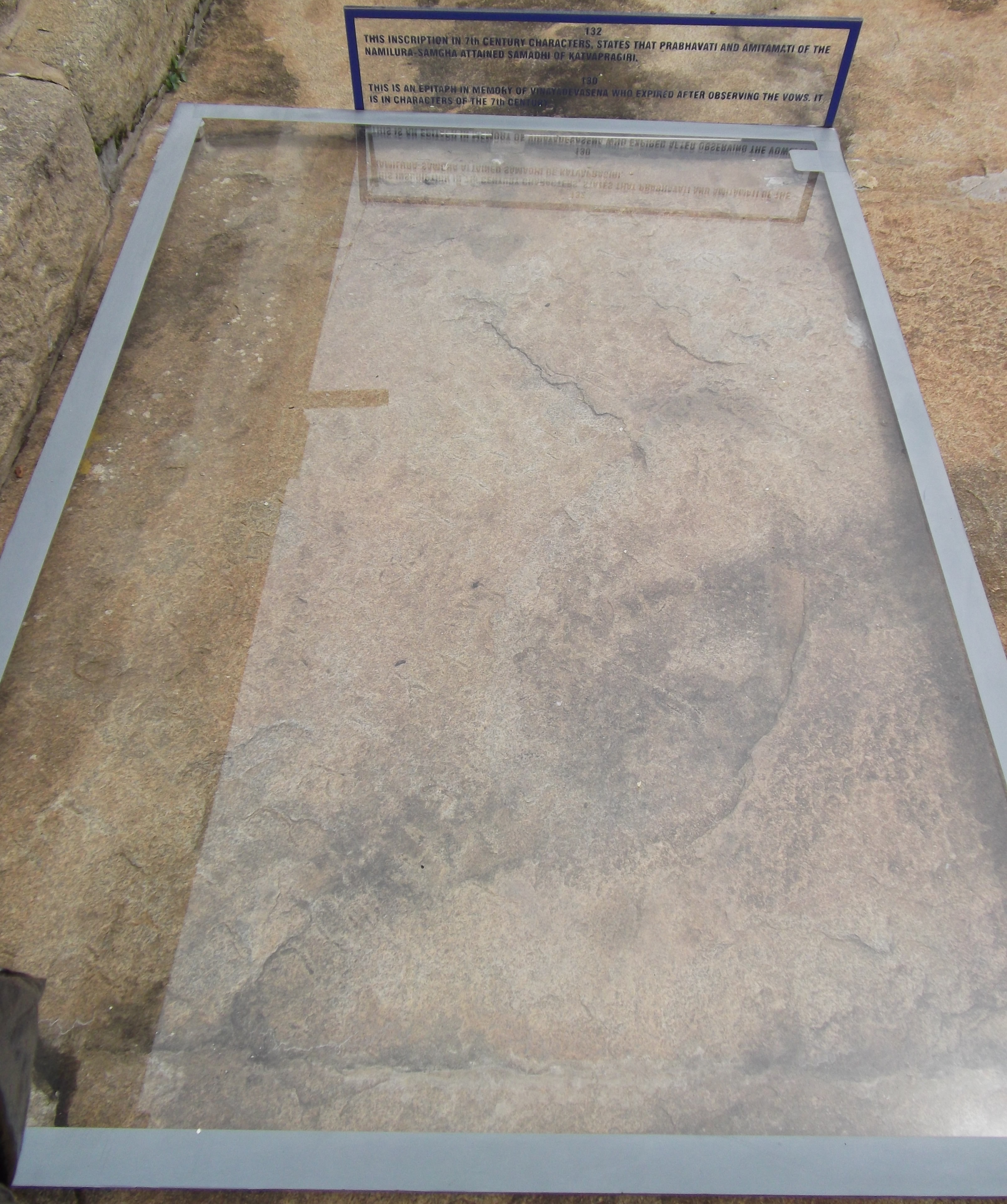
An inscription (No.130) in memory of Vinayadevasena who observed Sallekhana. 7th-century Kannada script. Found at Shravanbelgola, Karnataka, India.

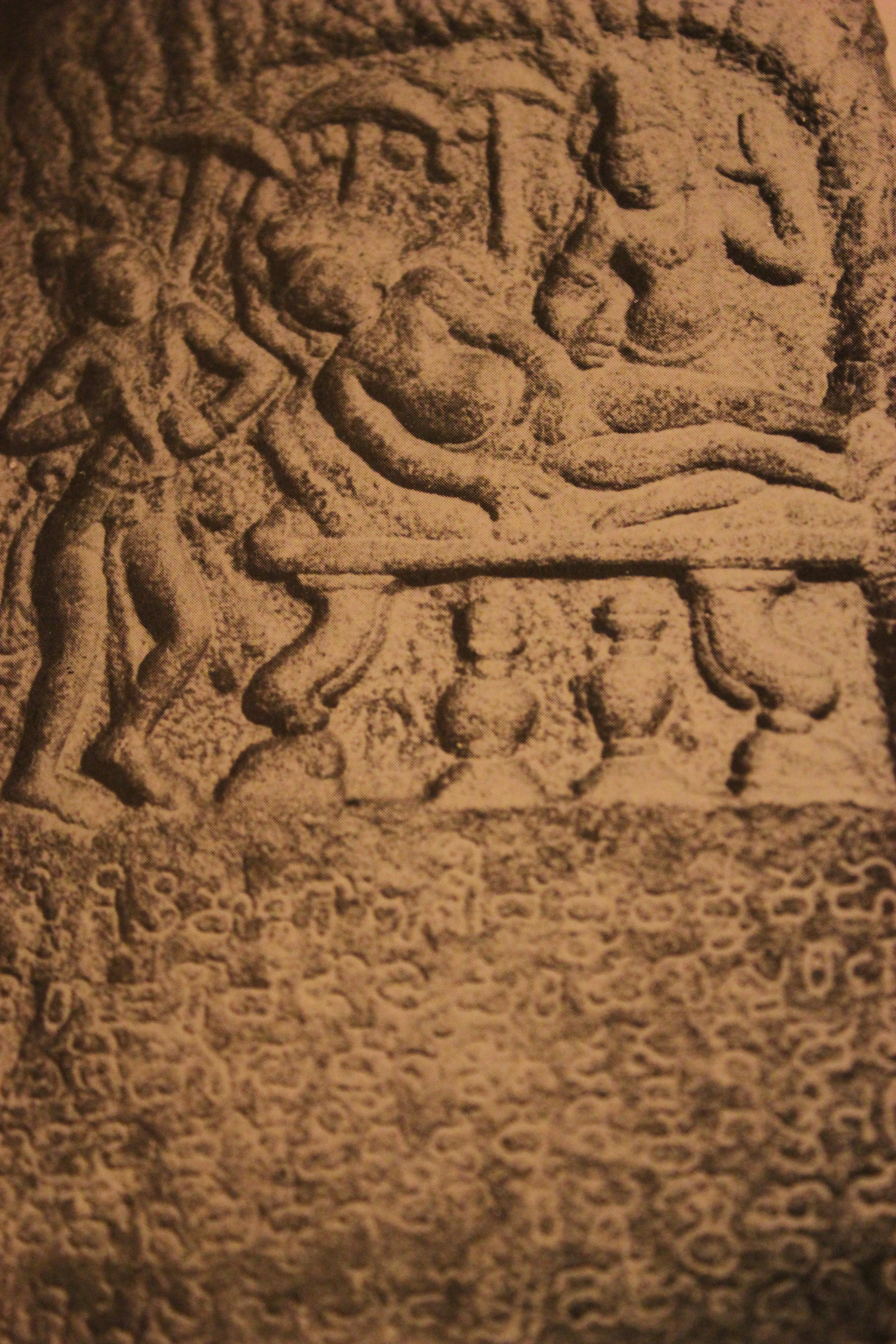
Doddahundi nishidhi inscription was raised in honor of Western Ganga King Nitimarga I in 869 CE who observed Sallekhana.

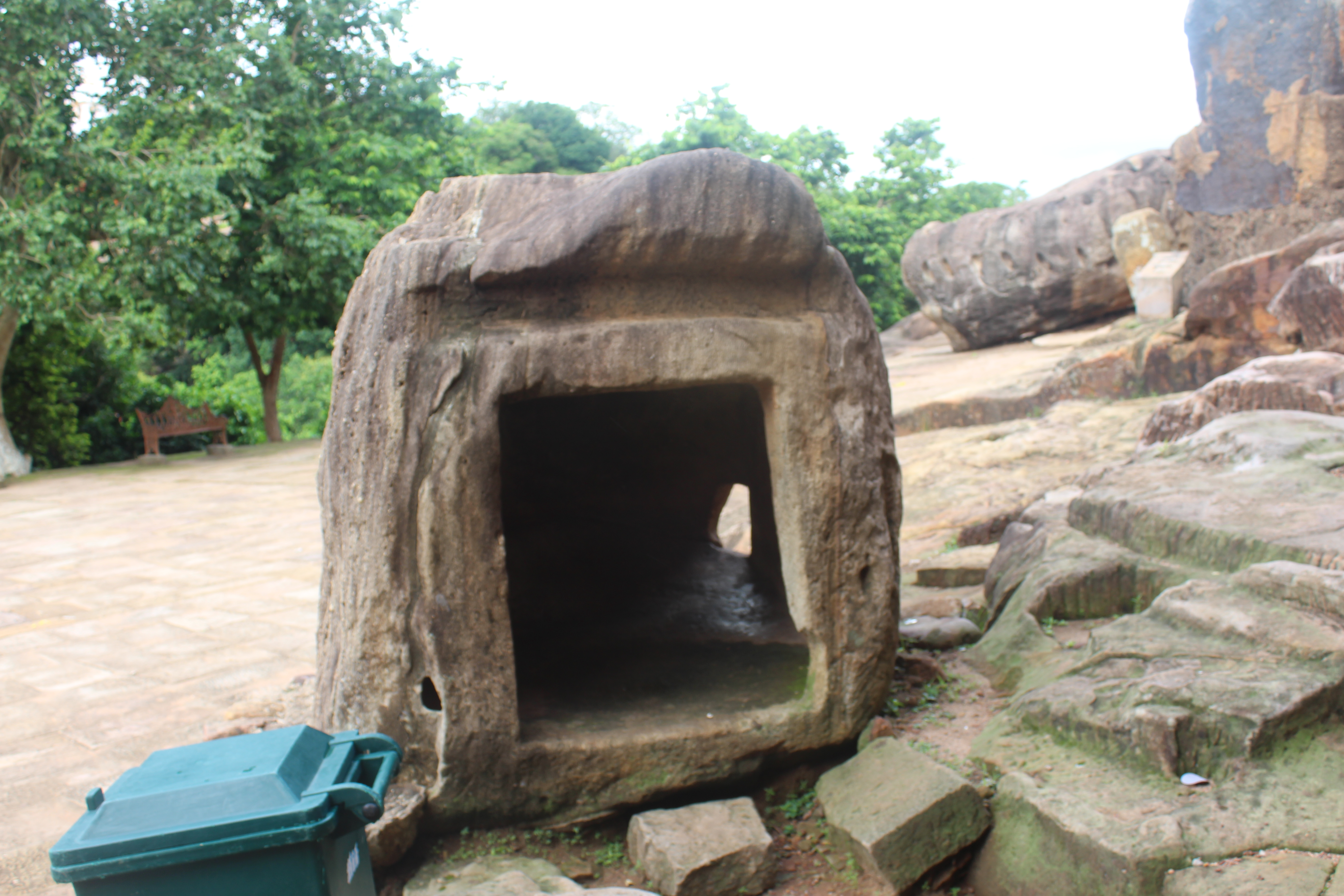
The chamber for the ascetics to observe Sallekhana at Udayagiri hills, Odisha, India

=== Textual ===
The Ācārāṅga Sūtra (c. 5th century BCE – c. 1st century BCE) describes three forms of the practice. Early Śvetāmbara (Note: Śvetāmbara and Digambara are two major sects of Jainism. See Jain schools and branches.) text Shravakaprajnapti notes that the practice is not limited to ascetics. The Bhagavati Sūtra (2.1) also describes Sallekhana in great detail, as it was observed by Skanda Katyayana, an ascetic of Mahavira. The 4th-century text Ratnakaranda śrāvakācāra and the Śvetāmbara text Nava-pada-prakarana also provide detailed descriptions. The Nava-pada-prakarana mentions seventeen methods of "voluntarily chosen death", of which it approves only three as consistent with the teachings of Jainism. The practice is also mentioned in the 2nd century CE Sangam-era poem Sirupanchamoolam.

The Panchashaka makes only a cursory mention of the practice and it is not described in Dharmabindu—both texts by Haribhadra (c. 5th century). In the 9th century text "Ādi purāṇa" by Jinasena the three forms are described. Yashastilaka by Somadeva (10th century) also describes the practice. Other writers like Vaddaradhane (10th century) and Lalitaghate also describe the Padapopagamana, one of its forms. Hemchandra (c. 11th century) describes it in a short passage despite his detailed coverage of the observances of householders (Shravakachara).

According to Tattvartha Sutra, "a householder willingly or voluntarily adopts Sallekhana when death is very near." According to the medieval era Jain text, Puruşārthasiddhyupāya, both the ascetics and the householder should "court voluntarily death at the end of life", thinking that only sallekhana is a pious death. The Silappadikaram (Epic of the Anklet) by the Jain prince-turned-monk, Ilango Adigal, mentions Sallekhana by the Jain nun, Kaundi Adigal.

=== Archeological ===
In South India, especially Karnataka, a memorial stone or footprint is erected to commemorate the death of a person who observed Sallekhana. This is known as Nishidhi, Nishidige or Nishadiga. The term is derived from the Sanskrit root Sid or Sad which means "to attain" or "waste away".

These Nishidhis detail the names, dates, the duration of the vow, and other austerities performed by the person who observed the vow. The earliest Nishidhis (6th to 8th century) mostly have an inscription on the rock without any symbols. This style continued until the 10th century when footprints were added alongside the inscription. After the 11th century, Nishidhis are inscribed on slabs or pillars with panels and symbols. These slabs or pillars were frequently erected in mandapas (pillared pavilions), near basadi (temples), or sometimes as an inscription on the door frame or pillars of the temple.

In Shravanabelgola in Karnataka, ninety-three Nishidhis are found ranging from circa the 6th century to the 19th century. Fifty-four of them belong to the period circa the 6th to the 8th century. It is believed that a large number of Nishidhis at Shravanabelgola follow the earlier tradition. Several inscriptions after 600 CE record that Bhadrabahu observed the vow atop Chandragiri Hill at Sharavnabelagola. Historians such as R. K. Mookerji consider the accounts unproven.

An undated inscription in old Kannada script is found on the Nishidhi from Doddahundi near Tirumakudalu Narasipura in Karnataka. Historians such as J. F. Fleet, I. K. Sarma, and E.P. Rice have dated it to 840 or 869 CE by its textual context. The memorial stone has a unique depiction in frieze of the ritual death (Sallekhana) of King Ereganga Nitimarga I (r. 853–869) of the Western Ganga Dynasty. It was raised by the king's son Satyavakya. In Shravanabelgola, the Kuge Brahmadeva pillar has a Nishidhi commemorating Marasimha, another Western Ganga king. An inscription on the pillar in front of Gandhavarna Basadi commemorates Indraraja, the grandson of the Rashtrakuta King Krishna III, who died in 982 after observing the vow.

The inscriptions in South India suggest sallekhana was originally an ascetic practice that later extended to Jain householders. Its importance as an ideal death in the spiritual life of householders ceased by about the 12th century. The practice was revived in 1955 by the Digambara monk Acharya Santisagara.

=== Modern ===
Sallekhana is a respected practice in the Jain community. It has not been a "practical or general goal" among Śvetāmbara Jains for many years. It was revived among Digambara monks. In 1955, Acharya Shantisagar, a Digambara monk took the vow because of his inability to walk without help and his weak eye-sight. In 1999, Acharya Vidyanand, another Digambara monk, took a twelve-year-long vow.

Between 1800 and 1992, at least 37 instances of Sallekhana are recorded in Jain literature. There were 260 and 90 recorded Sallekhana deaths among Śvetāmbara and Digambara Jains respectively between 1993 and 2003. According to Jitendra Shah, the Director of L D Institute of Indology in Ahmedabad, an average of about 240 Jains practice Sallekhana each year in India. Most of them are not recorded or noticed. Statistically, Sallekhana is undertaken both by men and women of all economic classes and among the educationally forward Jains. It is observed more often by women than men.

== Legality and comparison with suicide ==
Jain texts make a clear distinction between the Sallekhana and suicide. Its dualistic theology differentiates between soul and matter. The soul is reborn in the Jain belief based on accumulated karma, how one dies contributes to the karma accumulation, and a pious death reduces the negative karmic attachments. The preparation for sallekhana must begin early, much before the approach of death, and when death is imminent, the vow of Sallekhana is observed by progressively denying the body and the passions.

The comparison of Sallekhana with suicide is debated since the early time of Jainism. The early Buddhist Tamil epic Kundalakesi compared it to suicide. It is refuted in the contemporary Tamil Jain literature such as in Neelakesi.

Professor S. A. Jain cites differences between the motivations behind suicide and those behind Sallekhana to distinguish them:

It is argued that it is suicide since there is voluntary severance of life etc. No, it is not suicide, as there is no passion. Without attachment etc, there is no passion in this undertaking. A person who kills himself by means of poison, weapon, etc, swayed by attachment, aversion or infatuation, commits suicide. But he who practices holy death is free from desire, anger, and delusion. Hence it is not suicide.

Champat Rai Jain, a Jainist scholar, wrote in 1934:

Soul is a simple substance and as such immortal. Death is for compounds whose dissolution is termed disintegration and death is when it has reference to a living organism, that is a compound of spirit and matter. By dying in the proper way will is developed, and it is a great asset for the future life of the soul, which, as a simple substance, will survive bodily dissolution and death. The true idea of Sallekhana is only this when death does appear at last one should know how to die, that is one should die like a man, not like a beast, bellowing and panting and making vain efforts to avoid the unavoidable.

Modern-era Indian activists have questioned this rationale, calling the voluntary choice of death an evil similar to sati, and have attempted to legislate and judicially act against this religious custom. Article 21 of the Constitution of India, 1950, guarantees the right to life to all persons within the territory of India and its states. In Gian Kaur vs The State Of Punjab, the state high court ruled, "... 'right to life' is a natural right embodied in Article 21 but suicide is an unnatural termination or extinction of life and, therefore, incompatible and inconsistent with the concept of the right to life".

Nikhil Soni vs Union of India (2006), a case filed in the Rajasthan High Court, citing the Aruna Ramchandra Shanbaug vs Union Of India case related to euthanasia, and the Gian Kaur case, argued, "No person has a right to take his own life consciously, as the right to life does not include the right to end the life voluntarily." So the petitioner cited Sallekhana as suicide and thus punishable under Section 309 (attempt to commit suicide). The case also extended to those who helped facilitate the deaths of individuals observing Sallekhana, finding they were culpable under Section 306 (abetment of suicide) with aiding and abetting an act of suicide. It was also argued that Sallekhana "serves as a means of coercing widows and elderly relatives into taking their own lives". An attempt to commit suicide was a crime under Section 309 of the Indian Penal Code.

In response, the Jain community argued that prohibiting the practice is a violation of their freedom of religion, a fundamental right guaranteed by Article 15 and Article 25 of the Constitution of India. The book Sallekhana Is Not Suicide by former Justice T. K. Tukol was widely cited in the court which opined that "Sallekhana as propounded in the Jaina scriptures is not suicide."

The Rajasthan High Court stated that "[The Constitution] does not permit nor include under Article 21 the right to take one's own life, nor can it include the right to take life as an essential religious practice under Article 25 of the Constitution". It further added that it is not established that Sallekhana is an essential practise of Jainism and therefore not covered by Article 25 (1). So the High Court banned the practice in August 2015 making it punishable under Sections 306 (abetment of suicide) and 309 (attempt to commit suicide). Members of the Jain community held nationwide protest marches against the ban on Sallekhana.

Advocate Suhrith Parthasarathy criticised the judgement of the High Court and wrote, "Sallekhana is not an exercise in trying to achieve an unnatural death, but is rather a practice intrinsic to a person's ethical choice to live with dignity until death." He also pointed out that the Supreme Court in the Gian Kaur case explicitly recognises the right to live with human dignity within the ambit of the right to life. He further cited that the Supreme Court wrote in the said case, "[The right to life] may include the right of a dying man to also die with dignity when his life is ebbing out. But the right to die with dignity at the end of life is not to be confused or equated with the right to die an unnatural death curtailing the natural span of life."

On 31 August 2015, the Supreme Court admitted the petition by Akhil Bharat Varshiya Digambar Jain Parishad and granted leave. It stayed the decision of the High Court and lifted the ban on the practice.

In April 2017, the Indian parliament decriminalised suicide by passing the Mental Healthcare Act, 2017.

== In Hinduism and Buddhism ==
There are similar practices in other religions, like Prayopavesa in Hinduism and Sokushinbutsu in Buddhism.

The ancient and medieval scholars of Indian religions discussed suicide, and a person's right to voluntarily choose death. Suicide is not approved by Buddhist, Hindu and Jaina texts. For those who have renounced the world (sannyasi, sadhu, yati, bhikshu), the Indian texts discuss when ritual choice of death is appropriate and what means of voluntarily ending one's life are appropriate. The Sannyasa Upanishads, for example, discuss many methods of religious death, such as slowing then stopping the consumption of foods and drinks to death (similar to sallekhana), walking into a river and drowning, entering fire, a path of the heroes, and the Great Journey. (Note: The heroic path is explained as dying in a just battle on the side of dharma (right, good), and equivalent. The Great Journey is walking north without eating till one dies of exhaustion. A similar practise known as Vadakirutthal (literally facing north) was prevalent in Sangam period in Tamilnadu. It is mentioned in Tamil anthologies such as in Puranaanooru.)

Scholars disagree whether "voluntary religious death" discussed in Indian religions is the same as other forms of suicide.

== See also ==
- Jīva (Jainism)
- Death in Jainism
- Jain philosophy
- Moksha (Jainism)
- Catharist endura
