= Pushpadanta =

Ninth Tirthankara in Jainism

- 9th Jain Tirthankara
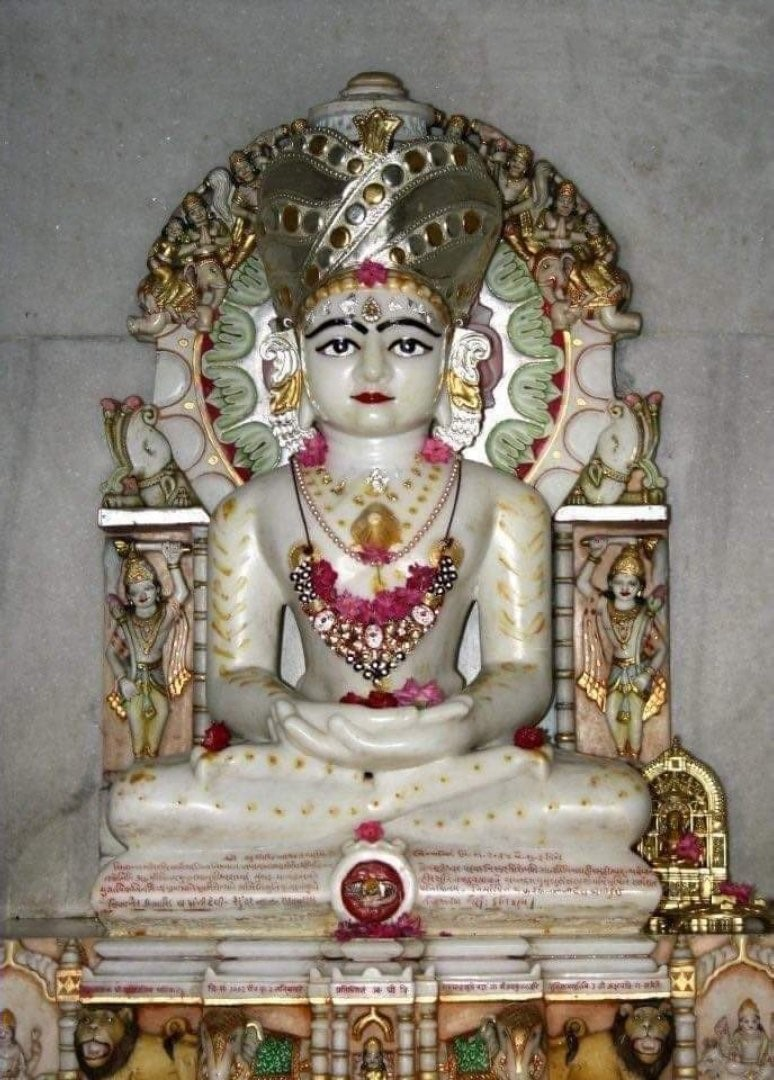
- Idol of Tirthankar Suvidhinath at Kakandi Tirth
- Other names: Suvidhinatha
- Venerated in: Jainism
- Predecessor: Chandraprabha
- Successor: Shitalanatha
- Symbol: Crocodile
- Height: 100 bows (300 meters)
- Age: 200,000 purva (14.112 quintillion years)
- Color: White

Genealogy
- Born: Khukhundoo, Deoria
- Died: Shikharji
- Parents: Sugriva (father); Rama (Supriya) (mother)
- Dynasty: Ikṣvākuvaṁśa

In Jainism, Pushpadanta (Sanskrit: पुष्पदन्त), also known as Suvidhinatha, was the ninth Tirthankara of the present age (Avasarpini). According to Jain tradition, he became an arihant, and upon attaining moksha became a siddha, a liberated soul that has destroyed all of its karma.

== Life and legends ==
According to Jain tradition, Pushpadanta is venerated as the ninth tirthankara of the present cosmic age (avasarpini). Traditional Jain historiography states that he was born into the ancient Ikshvaku dynasty to King Sugriva and Queen Rama in the city of Kakandi, which is identified with modern-day Khukhundoo in Uttar Pradesh. His birth is traditionally observed on the fifth day of the Margashirsha Krishna month of the lunisolar Jain calendar. Within the expansive framework of Jain cosmology, texts attribute to him a symbolic lifespan of 200,000 purvas and a physical height of 100 bows (dhanushas).

A significant theological milestone attributed to Pushpadanta in Jain narratives is his re-establishment of the four-part monastic order (sangha) originally founded by Rishabhanatha. After ruling his kingdom, traditional accounts describe him renouncing worldly attachments to become an ascetic, eventually attaining omniscience (Kevala Jnana). Following his period of preaching, he ultimately achieved liberation from the cycle of rebirth (moksha) on the sacred peaks of Mount Shikharji in modern-day Jharkhand.

Pushpadanta is said to have been born 90 crore sagara after his predecessor, Chandraprabha. His successor, Shitalanatha, is said to have been born 9 crore sagara after him.

== Iconography ==
In Jain art and sculpture, Pushpadanta is traditionally depicted in a meditative posture and is distinctly identified by his white physical complexion. He is explicitly recognized by his unique iconographic emblem, the crocodile or alligator (Makara), which is typically carved or stamped onto the pedestal beneath his idols. As with all tirthankaras, he is depicted alongside his dedicated guardian deities (Shashan-devatas). According to both the Digambara and Śvētāmbara traditions, his accompanying male guardian deity (yaksha) is Ajita. However, sectarian texts differ regarding his female guardian (yakshi), with the Digambara sect identifying her as Mahakali and the Śvētāmbara sect identifying her as Sutaraka (or Sutari).

== Temples and legacy ==
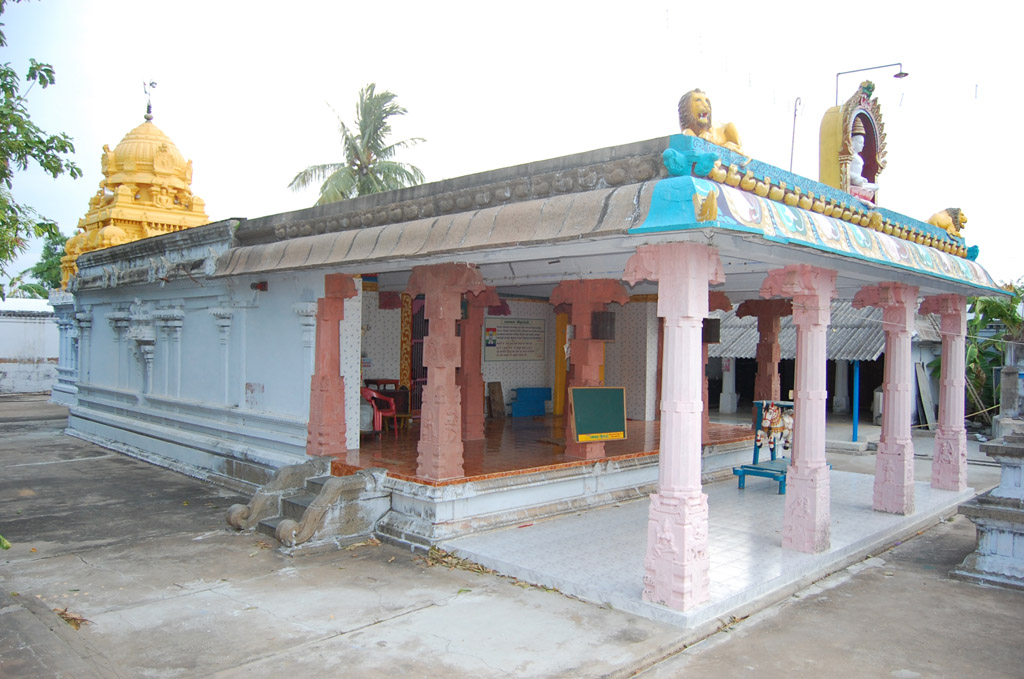
Thirupanamur Jain Temple

As the ninth tirthankara, Pushpadanta is venerated across the Indian subcontinent.

=== Places of birth and liberation ===
The ancient site of Kakandi (modern Khukhundoo in the Deoria district of Uttar Pradesh), traditionally identified in Jain universal history as his royal birthplace, serves as a significant historical and geographic center for his worship. The Kakandi Jain Tirth remains an important pilgrimage destination that commemorates his early life and renunciation. Furthermore, marking the geographic site of his ultimate spiritual liberation, a dedicated shrine (tonk) enshrining his footprints (charan) is actively venerated by pilgrims on the peaks of Mount Shikharji.

=== Other temples ===
Thirupanamur Jain Temple is a major Jain center dedicated to Pushpadanta.

== See also ==
- God in Jainism
- Jainism and non-creationism
