= Karanthai Jain temple =

Historic Jain temple complex in Tamil Nadu, India

Karanthai Jain Temple
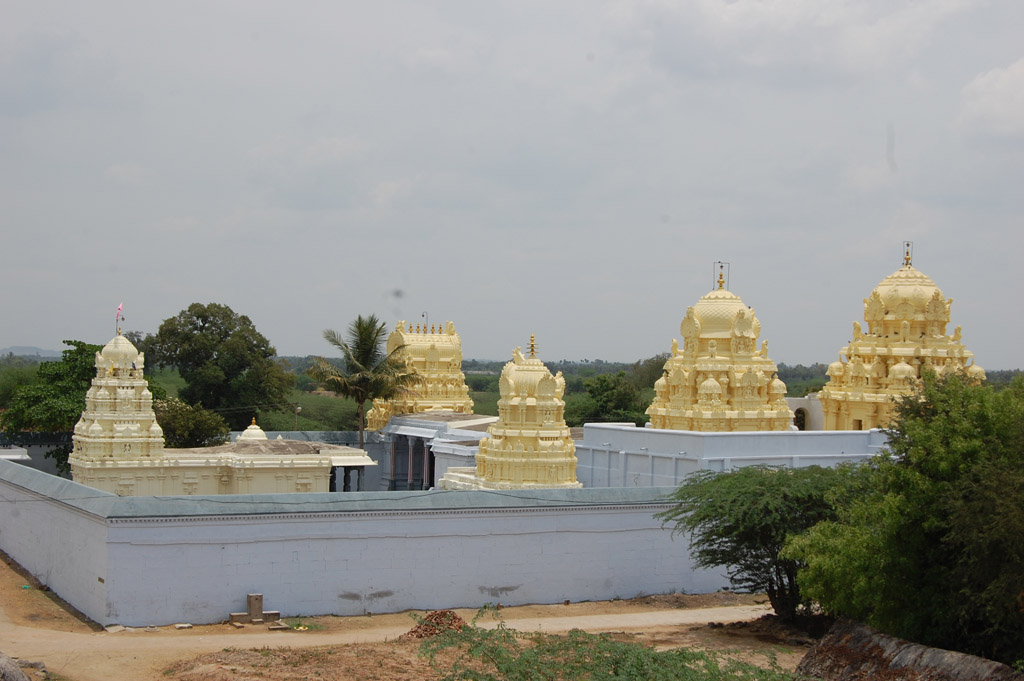
- Karanthai Jain temple

- Location within Tamil Nadu

Religion
- Affiliation: Jainism
- Sect: Digambara
- Deity: Kunthunatha, Mahavira
- Festival: Mahavir Jayanti

Location
- Location: Karanthai, Tiruvannamalai
- Coordinates: 12°45′40″N 79°35′15″E

Architecture
- Style: Vijayanagara architecture
- Creator: Nandivarman III
- Established: 9th century CE
- Temple: 2

The Karanthai Jain temples or Munigiri Digambar Jain temple is a historic Jain temple complex at Karanthai in Tiruvannamalai district, Tamil Nadu, India. The principal shrine is dedicated to Kunthunatha. Karanthai received patronage from Pallavas, Cholas and the Vijayanagara Empire.

== History ==
Karanthai is one of the historic Jain settlements of Tamil Nadu. The temple dates back to medieval period. There are inscriptions that records associated with the Pallava and Chola periods. There is an inscription with records from the reign of the Nandivarman III, ninth century Pallava dynasty.

The temple received patronage during the Chola period and was known as Virarajendrapperumpalli, named after Virarajendra Chola. Virarajendra, Kulottunga I and Rajaraja III made endowments to the Jain establishment at Karanthai. The main temple is dedicated to Kunthunatha whereas smaller shrines is dedicated to Mahavira. The inscription names the Mahavira temple as Tirukkattampalli Alvar. Mahavira shrine underwent renovations and additions including shrines and mandapas, were undertaken during the reign of Kulottunga III. An inscription associated with Virarajendra records a land grants offered to Jain temple.

The temple continued to receive patronage during the Vijayanagara period. } The inscription states imposition of jodi tax on temple lands by Ramappa Nayaka, an officer of Narasimharaya, had resulted in the neglect of a number of religious establishments. An inscription dated 1510 CE records Krishnadevaraya exempted the tax-free upon his accession. An inscription dated 1510 CE, the record, names temple Virarajendrasolapperumpalli benefited.

Tiruppaṇamūr and Karandai are referred as twin Jain villages and records the continued preservation of traditions concerning Akalanka among the Tamil Jain community.

== Architecture ==
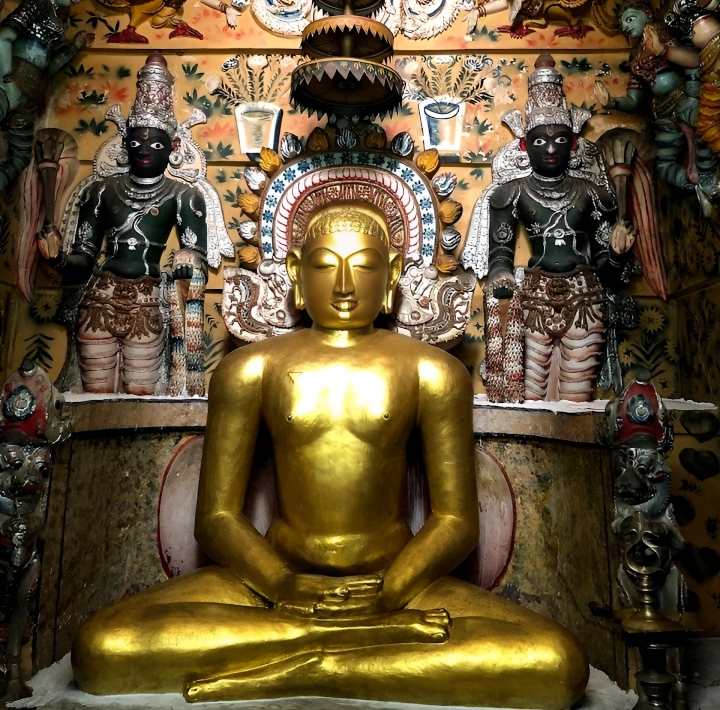
Kunthunatha idol, the mulnayak of temple

The Karanthai complex developed over different historical periods. The principal temple is dedicated to Kunthunatha. A separate shrine in the complex is associated with Vardhamana Mahavira. The principal temple faces east and is entered through a gopuram. Beyond the entrance is a large pillared mandapa. Sculptural decoration occurs on the pillars and other architectural elements of the complex.

The architectural history of the complex reflects several periods of construction and renovation rather than a single building campaign. Chola-period inscriptions record additions to the Vardhamana temple during the reign of Kulothunga III. Later architectural and artistic additions were made under subsequent rulers.

== Inscriptions ==
Karanthai is particularly important for its collection of inscriptions. These records provide evidence for the history of the temple, its patrons, land transactions, religious endowments and the historical names by which the Jain establishment was known. The inscriptions place Karanthai within the historical administrative geography of the region. Epigraphs identify the settlement in relation to Kaliyur Nadu and Kaliyur Kottam in Jayankonda Chola Mandalam.

During the Chola period, inscriptions refer to the Jain establishment as Virarajendrapperumpalli. The records document royal and local patronage and provide evidence for the continued functioning of the temple under successive Chola rulers. The Vijayanagara inscription of Krishnadevaraya dated 1510 identifies the establishment as Virarajendrasolapperumpalli. It records the removal of taxation from religious lands and demonstrates that the Jain temple continued to possess endowed lands during the early sixteenth century.

== Art ==
The temple preserves artistic material belonging to different periods of its history. Its architectural and sculptural elements include representations associated with Jain religious iconography. The temple also contains paintings attributed to the Vijayanagara period. These later artistic additions illustrate the continued use and development of the Jain complex after the Chola period.

== Religious significance ==
Kunthunatha, the seventeenth Tirthankara, is the principal deity of the temple. The presence of a separate Vardhamana Mahavira shrine and inscriptional references to multiple Jain teachers and religious activities indicate the broader religious importance of the complex during the medieval period.

Karanthai remains a functioning Jain religious centre. In February 2017, a five-day Pancha Kalyana festival was held at Karanthai, commemorating the five principal auspicious events in the life of a Tirthankara. The Times of India reported that the fourth day of the festival commemorated the attainment of absolute knowledge by Kunthunatha.

== See also ==
- Thirupanamur Jain Temple
- Trilokyanatha Temple
- Mel Sithamur Jain Math
