= Death in Jainism =

According to Jainism, Ātman (soul) is eternal and never dies. According to Tattvartha Sutra which is a compendium of Jain principles, the function of matter (pudgala) is to contribute to pleasure, suffering, life and death of living beings.

== Types of Deaths ==
According to Jain texts, there are 17 different types of death:

- Avici-marana
- Avadhimarana
- Atyantika-marana
- Vasaharta-marana
- Valana-marana
- Antahsalya-marana
- Tadhava-marana
- Bala-marana or Akama marana
- Pandita-marana or Sakama marana
- Balpandita-marana
- Chadmastha-marana
- Kevali-marana
- Vaihayasa-marana
- Guddhapristha-marana
- Bhaktapratyakhyana-marana
- Inginta-marana
- Padopagamana-marana

=== Akama Marana & Sakama Marana ===
Out of all 17 types of Marana, two are considered important:

Akama Marana which refers to someone who has attachment to life and doesn't want to die but dies when his life is over. Therefore, he has died helplessly and not on his own accord. According to Jainism, this person is often one who is willingly or unwillingly ignorant to the concepts of rebirth, other worlds, and liberation of the soul.

Sakama Marana which refers to someone who is not afraid of death and who accepts it willingly and at ease. They understand that there is no way to avoid death and that it is a natural process. Sakama Marana can be further divided into 4 types. These are Samadhi marana, anasana, santharo, and sallekhana.

== See also ==
- Sallekhana

== Bibliography ==
- Cort, John E. Jains in the World: Religious Values and Ideology in India. Oxford: Oxford University Press, 2000.
- Laidlaw, James. Riches and Renunciation: Religion, Economy, and Society among the Jains. Oxford: Clarendon Press, 1995.
- Shah, Natubhai. Jainism: The World of Conquerors. 2 vols. Brighton: Sussex Academic Press, 1998.
