= Doddahundi nishidhi inscription =

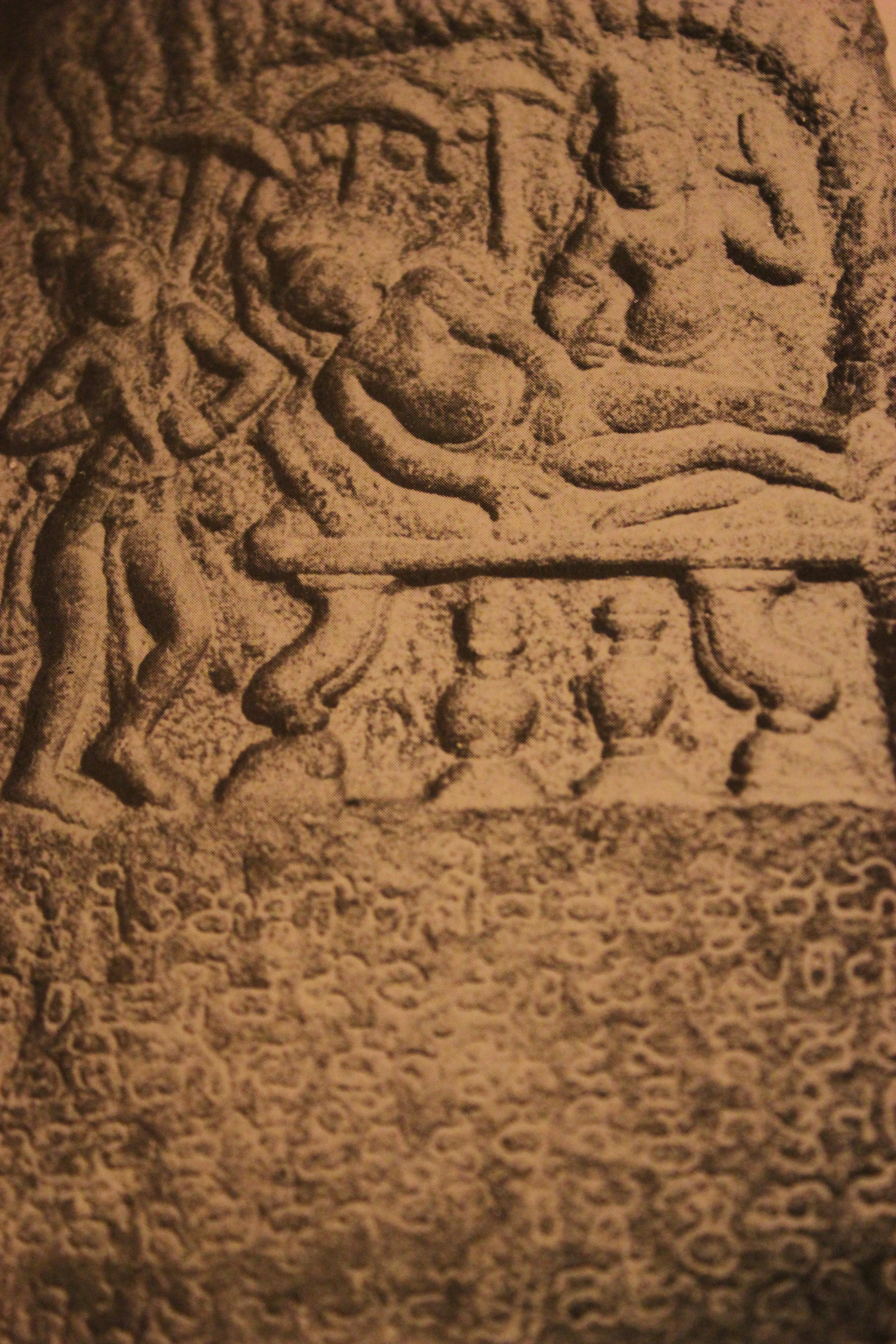
The Doddahundi nishidahi stele depicting the death of King Neetimarga I, with old Kannada inscription dated 840 or 869 C.E.

The Doddahundi nishidhi and inscription is a hero stone from Doddahundi, 18 km from Tirumakudalu Narasipura in the Mysore district, Karnataka state, India. It has an undated old Kannada language inscription which historians J. F. Fleet, I. K. Sarma and E.P. Rice have dated by context to 840 or 869 C.E. The hero stone has a unique depiction in frieze of the ritual death (sallekhana and samadhi) of the Western Ganga Dynasty king Ereganga Nitimarga I (r. 853-869). The memorial was raised by the king's son Satyavakya. Such nishidhi's (memorial spot) were raised in medieval India in honor of important Jain personalities who ended their life voluntarily after following severe ritual vow. The Western Ganga period produced not only imposing and well sculptured pillars (stambha) but also noteworthy hero stones (virgal) with exceptional relief. According to historian and epigraphist J. F. Fleet who edited the inscription, the names in the record are titles and not personal names. He dated the inscription to 840 C.E. with the opinion that the Nitimarga in the inscription is actually Ranavikrama, son of King Sripurusha (r. 726-788).

== Background ==
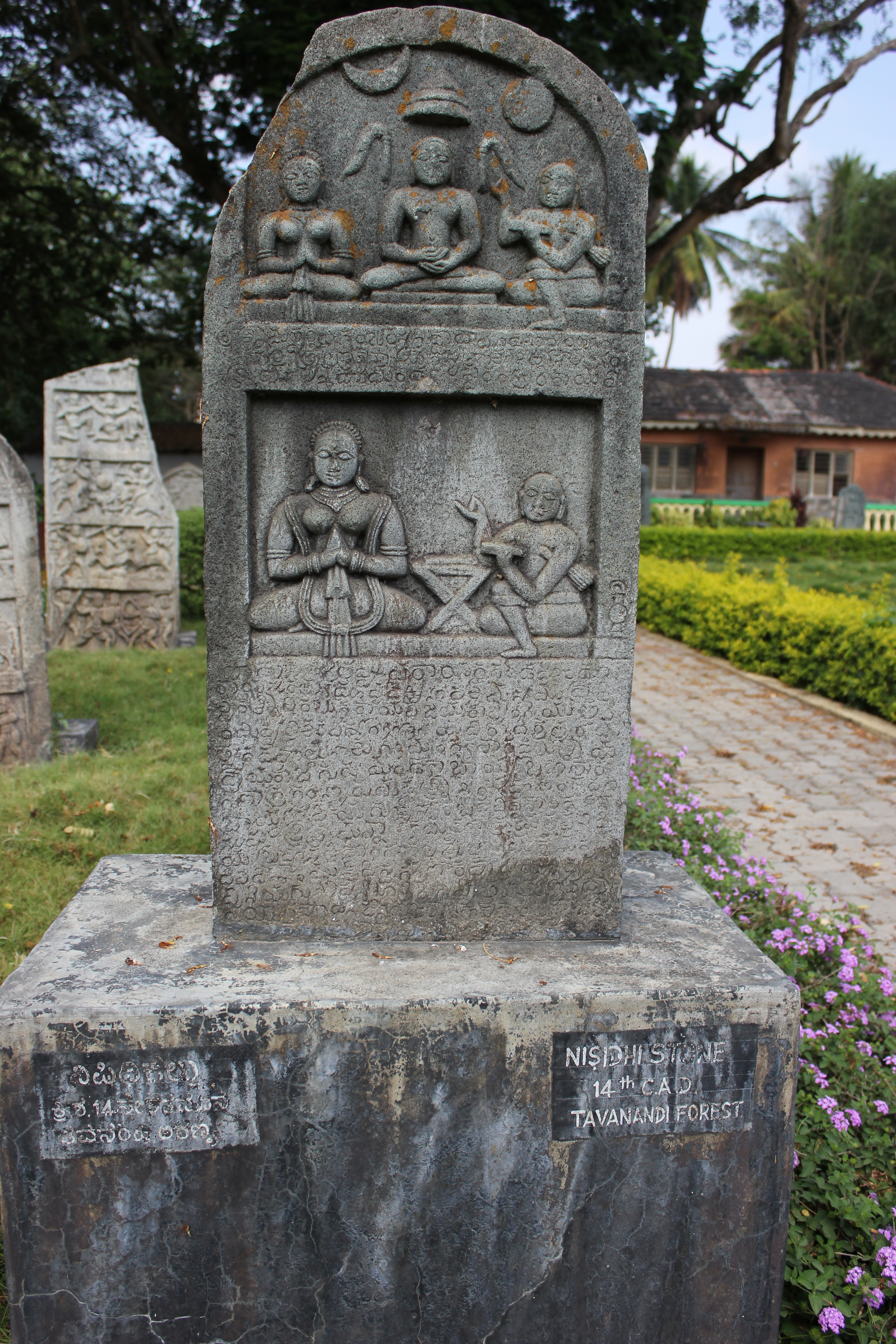
An example of a Nishidhi inscription from the 14th century with Kannada language inscription

In Jainism, the term nishidhi (with variants called nisidhia, nisadhi or nistige) is the spot where the person, such as an ascetic, king or queen died voluntarily, or was cremated or bone relic buried. Such places were held in high regard, a pedestal (vedika) created and prayers (puja and pratishtha) offered regularly. Often, the nishidhigal (lit, nishidhi stone) was nothing more than a natural rock surface or a boulder. Inscribed on the nishidhigal were epitaphs that immortalized and described the scholarly and saintly achievements of the deceased one, man or woman. Nishidhi's dated to as early as the 7th century exist in the Shravanabelagola hills. One memorial raised by King Sripurusha for Mahaprabhu Gopayya dates from the 8th century. The Doddahundi nishidhi is one of the most noteworthy examples found from the Western Ganga period.

== Depiction ==
According to the historian Sarma, the Doddahundi nishidhi stone has its frieze set inside a square panel whose borders are etched to create the impression of flames that further accentuate the grave event. The dying king, who exudes a calm countanence, is lying on a couch with his head on a double pillow and is attended to by his personal guard Agarayya. An agitated Prince Satyavakya stands behind the king with a dagger and sword. The inscription below the frieze reads "bee at the pair of lotus feet of Arhat Bhattaraka" (referring to Jinasena, the kings guru and author of the Jain text Adipurana).

== See also ==
- Jainism in Karnataka
- Jainism in north Karnataka
- Jainism in Tulu Nadu
