= Muhammad Abdullah Draz =

Egyptian Quran scholar (1894–1958)

Muhammad Abdullah Draz (Arabic: محمد عبد الله دراز) –1958-1894) was a prominent Egyptian Quran scholar and Professor of Islamic studies at Al-Azhar University.

== Biography ==
Muhammad Abdullah Draz was born in Mahallat Diyai, a village in Desouk Markaz, Kafr al-Shaykh Governorate in northern Egypt, in the year 1894. His father was also an Islamic scholar who received his education at Al-Azhar university. He enrolled Draz in a religious institute in Alexandria connected with Al-Azhar. Draz pursued this religious education from early childhood and earned degrees in religious studies. He then chose to study French because he saw it as critical to helping the cause of Egyptian independence. During the 1919 massive protest, he and a number of young Egyptians toured the foreign embassies to explain the uprisings and seek assistance in encouraging Great Britain, to comply to the Egyptian people's aspirations for independence. He was recruited to the Department of Higher Education's teaching staff of Al-Azhar in 1928. The next year, he was assigned to the same university's Department of Specialization, and in 1930, was transferred to the Faculty of Usul Al-Din, which primarily focuses on the sources of Islamic knowledge.

He was deployed on a mission to France in 1936, where he served for 12 years. He had already decided on the sort of research he intended to conduct during his postgraduate studies. He decided to research the Islamic perspective on morality. He was accepted to the Sorbonne University where he studied philosophy, logic, ethics, psychology, and sociology. Draz was awarded a PhD in 1947 for his work. After returning to Egypt, he taught history of religions at the University of Cairo and Qur'anic Commentary at Dar Al-Uloom, a teachers' college associated with Al-Azhar at the time. He was also a professor at Al-Azhar University, where he taught Arabic and moral philosophy. In 1949, he was elected to the Jamaat Kibar Al-Ulema', a group of Senior Islamic Scholars. He held these positions until his death in Lahore, Pakistan, in January 1958, while attending a conference.

== Works ==
- Introduction to the Qur'an
- The Qur’an: an Eternal Challenge
- Morality in the Quran: The Greater Good of Humanity
- The Moral World of the Qurʾān (Translated by Danielle Robinson and Rebecca Masterton)
