= Inguva Kartikeya Sarma =

Indian archeologist (1937–2013)

Inguva Kartikeya Sarma (15 October 1937 – 29 November 2013) was an Indian archaeologist and a director of the Salar Jung Museum.

== Education and career ==
I. K. Sarma was born in the village of Pallipadu in the Nellore district of Andhra Pradesh. He obtained a Post Graduate Diploma in Archaeology from the School of Archaeology, the academic wing of Archaeological Survey of India (ASI) in New Delhi. In 1958, Sarma joined the Archaeological Survey of India as a technical assistant in 1958. From 1983 to 1993, he was the Superintending Archaeologist of the ASI's Excavation Branch at Nagpur. From 1993 to 1997, he served as the Director of Salar Jung Museum in Hyderabad.

Sarma was involved in excavations at several sites in Andhra Pradesh, Gujarat, Maharashtra, Rajasthan, Telangana and Tamil Nadu. These sites include Nagarjunakonda (1956–1957); Kalibangan (1960–1962 and 1964–1966); Paiyampalli (1968); Pauni (1969–1970); Surkotada (1970–1971); Amaravati and Gudimallam (1974–1975); and Pedavegi and Guntupalli (1985–1987). In the 1970s, he also surveyed the remains of a Jain site at Aretippur in Karnataka.

== Personal life and death ==
Sarma was married, and he and his wife had two daughters and a son. During the last years of his life, he suffered from Alzheimer's disease. He died on 29 November 2013 at his home in Hyderabad,

== Selected works ==
Sarma's published works include:

- Coinage of the Satavahana Empire. Agam Kala Press. 1980.
- The Development of Early Śaiva Art and Architecture: With Special Reference to Āndhradēśa. Sundeep. 1982.
- Buddhist Monuments of China and South-East India: An Archaeological Perspective. Sundeep. 1985. ISBN 978-0-8364-2184-2.
- Religion in Art and Historical Archaeology of South India: Contacts and Correlations. University of Madras. 1987.
- Studies in Early Buddhist Monuments and Brāhmī Inscriptions of Āndhradēśa. Dattsons. 1988.
- Temples of the Gaṅgas of Karṇāṭaka. Archaeological Survey of India. 1992.
- Paraśurāmēśvara Temple at Gudimallam: A Probe Into Its Origins. Datt Sons. 1994. ISBN 978-81-7192-015-0.
- Early Brāhmī Inscriptions from Sannati. Harman Publishing House. 1993. ISBN 978-81-85151-68-7.
