= Trilokyanatha Temple =

Temple in Tamil Nadu, India

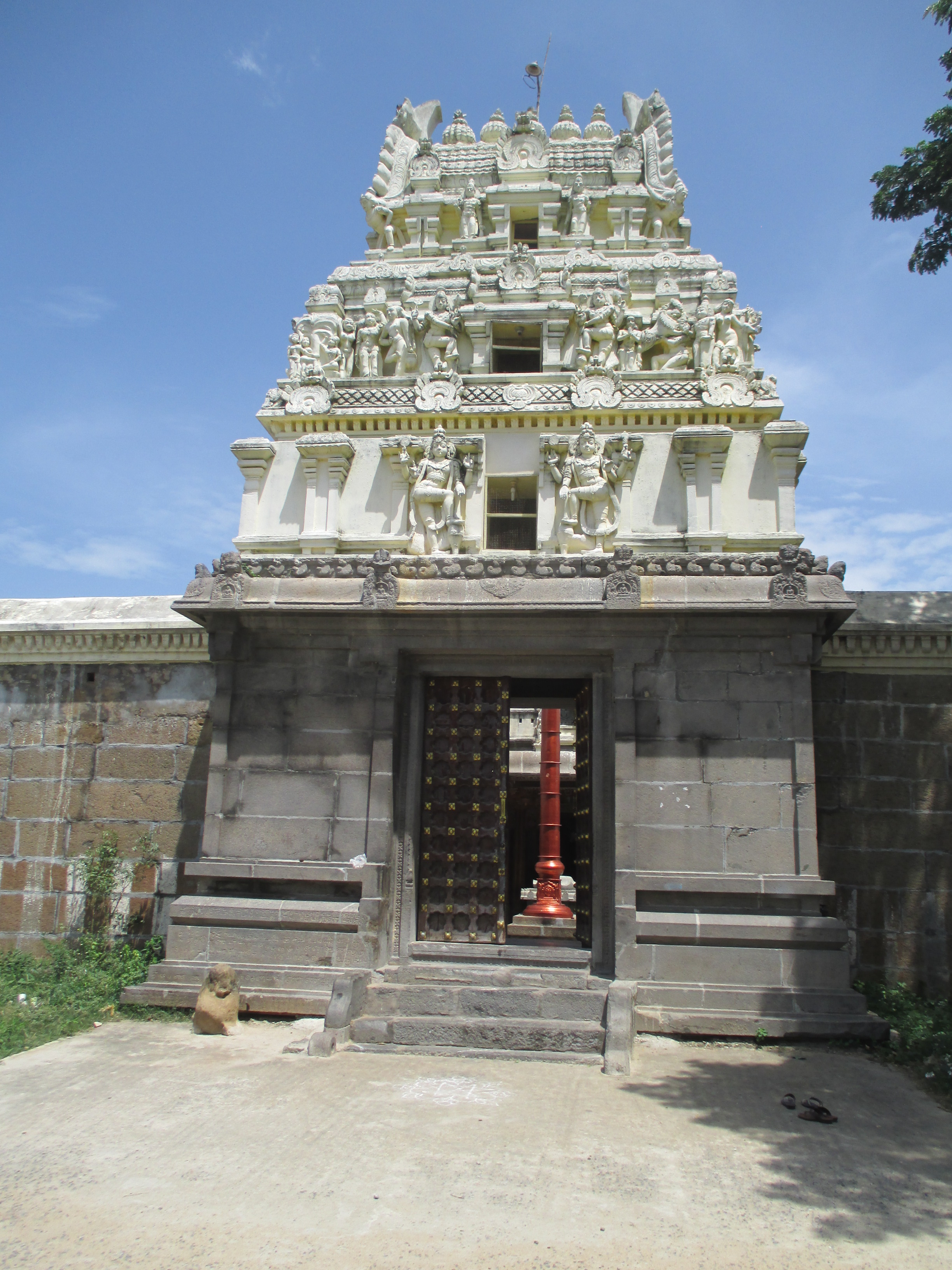

- Location in Tamil Nadu

Religion
- Affiliation: Jainism
- Deity: Mahavira

Location
- Location: Thiruparthikundram, Kanchipuram, Tamil Nadu
- Coordinates: 12°49′49″N 79°40′51″E

Architecture
- Style: Dravidian
- Creator: King Simhavishnu
- Established: 8th Century

Trilokyanatha Temple, also called Thirupparuthikundram Jain temple or Jeenaswamy Trilokyanathar temple, is an 8th-century Digambara Jain temple in Thiruparthikundram, in northeast Kanchipuram in Tamil Nadu, India. The suburb and the area around this temple is also called Jain Kanchi. The stone temple is dedicated to the Jain Tirthankaras, but is notable for integrating Hindu deities with Jain deities within the premises of the temple, particularly as Ksetrapalas. Constructed in Dravidian architecture, the temple was built during the reign of Narasimhavarman II of the Pallava dynasty. The temple was expanded by the Jain community with financial support of Medieval Cholas, later Pallavas and Vijayanagar kings.

The temple is administered by Department of Archaeology of the Government of Tamil Nadu as a protected monument, while it is maintained by hereditary trustees.

== History ==
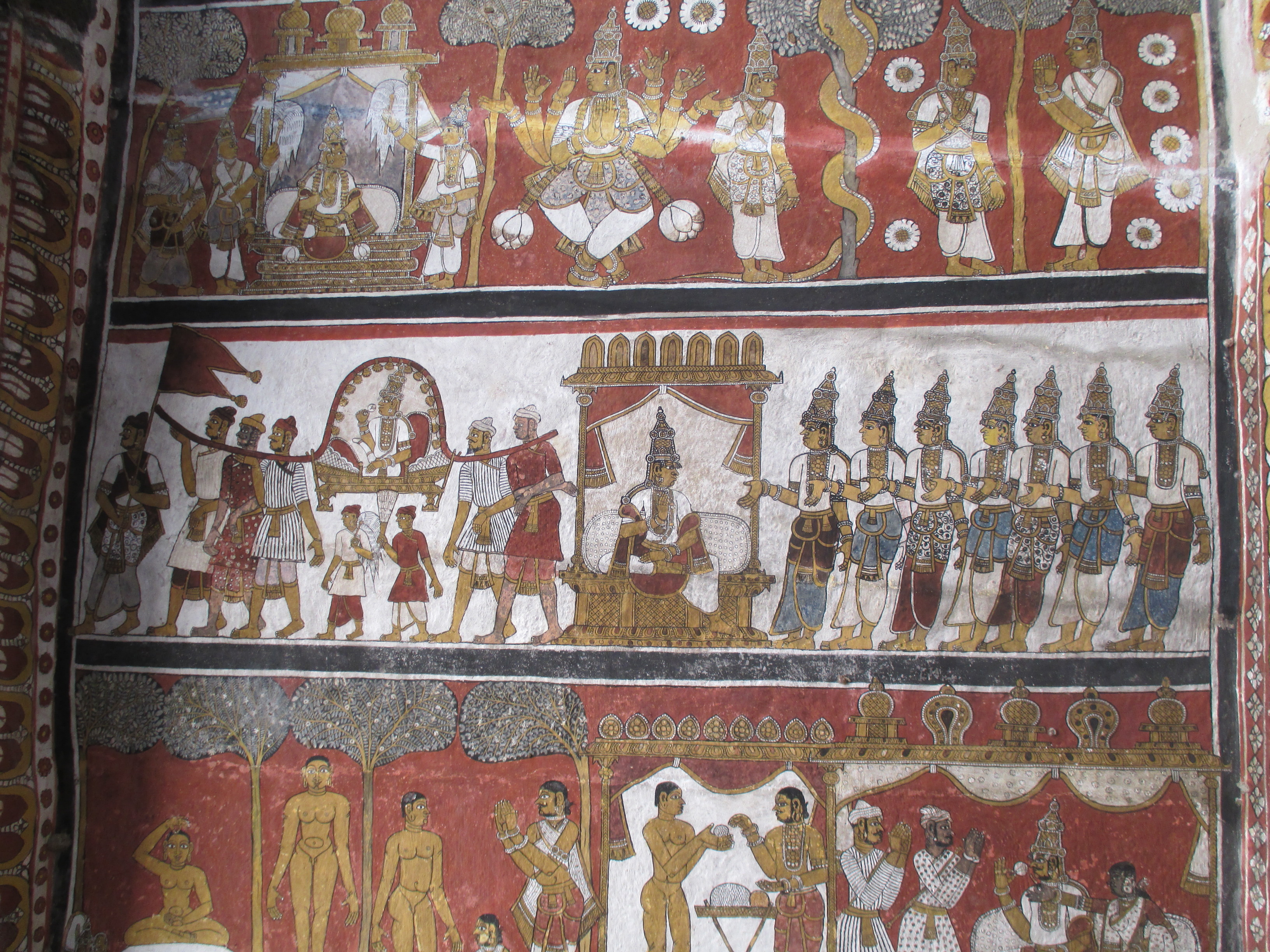
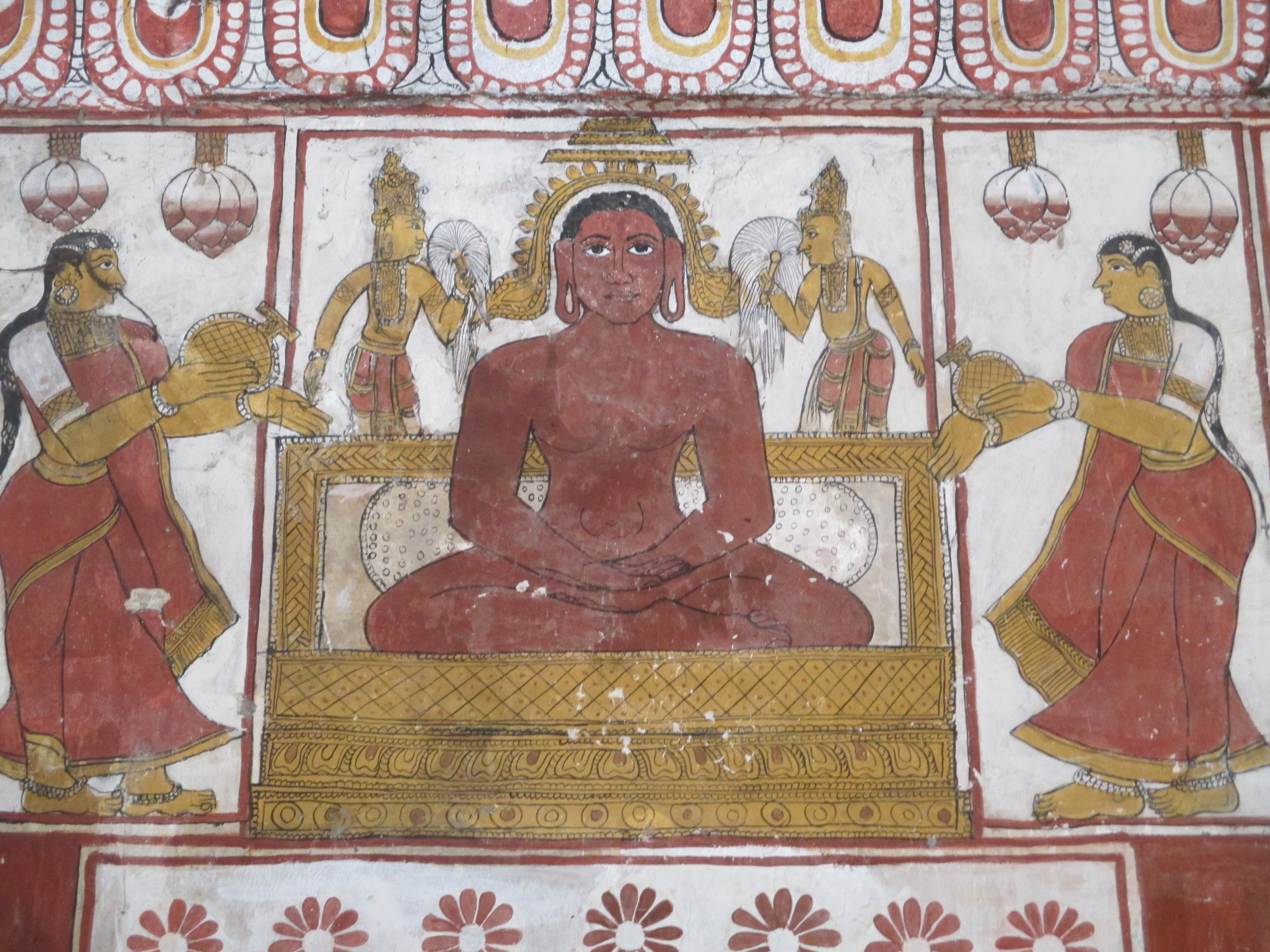
Paintings on the walls of the shrines

Pallavas, the rulers of the region embraced Jainism during their early years. As per local legend, the temple was constructed by the Pallava disciple of the sages Vamana and Mallisena. There are other legends which attribute the construction of the temple by Simhavishnu, the first Pallava king during the last decade of 6th century. The temple is believed to have been built during 8th century around 800 AD during the reign of Pallava kings. It has inscriptions from Pallava king, Narasimhavarman II (700-728 CE) and the following Medieval Chola kings Rajendra Chola I (1054-63 CE), Kulothunga Chola I (1070-1120 CE) and Vikrama Chola (1118-35 CE), and the Kanarese inscriptions of Krishnadevaraya (1509-29 CE). The Chola and Vijayanagar inscriptions indicate large endowments to the temple. The temple has many old paintings on the walls. Krishnadevaraya helped repaint the 13th century paintings during the 15th-16th centuries. The temple is maintained by Tamil Nadu archaeological department. The temple tower is believed to have been constructed by Sage Pushpasena Vamanarya during 1199. The walls of the temple are believed to have been constructed by Azhagiya Pallavan during the 13th century. There is a musical hall in the temple (called Sangeetha Mandapa) built by Irugappa, the minister of Vijayanagara king during 1387.

== Architecture ==
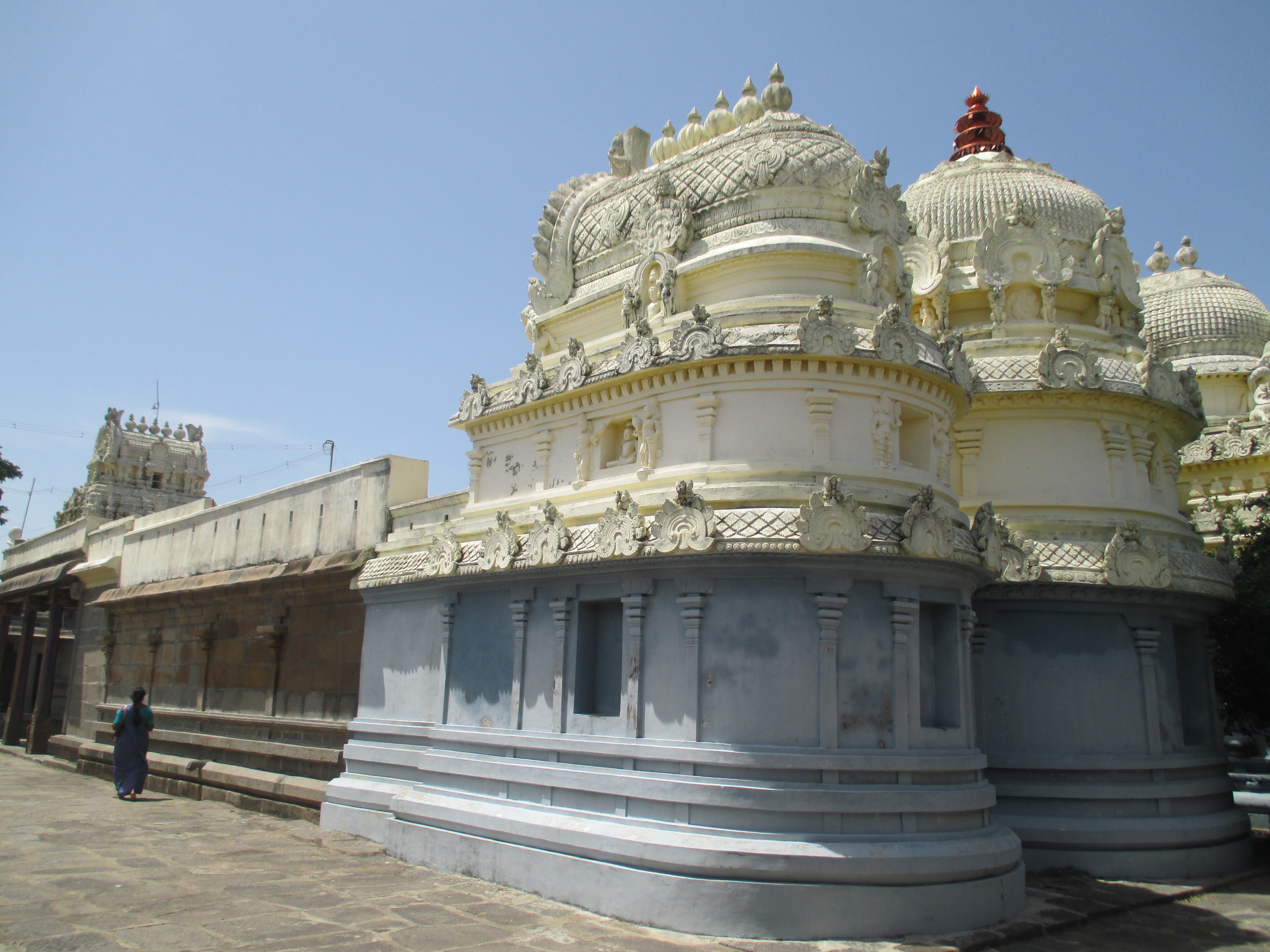
The roof top of the three shrines in the temple

The temple is built in Dravidian architecture with a three-tiered gopuram (gateway tower). There are three parallel shrines in the temple with the image of Mahavira occupying the centre. The image of Lokanathar, the 24th Tirthankara is located on the Northern side, while Neminatha housed in the Southern side. All the three sanctums are circular in shape housing the bronze images. The sanctum of Mahavira accommodates Dharmadevi and a Tirthankara on either of his sides. There are painted pillars in the hall leading to the sanctum. As in other South Indian Hindu temples, there is a flag post (called Dwajasthambam) in between and axial to the entrance and the sanctum. The temple has a large number of paintings on the ceilings that are captioned in Tamil-Grantha script. It is believed that Jain scriptures have the life story of Krishna assimilated and most of the paintings depict the life story of Krishna. An Adinatha subshrine is one of its kind found in this temple. The structure of the temple has undergone several changes over the centuries, but the image of Adinatha remains the same from the 16th century.

== Other temples ==
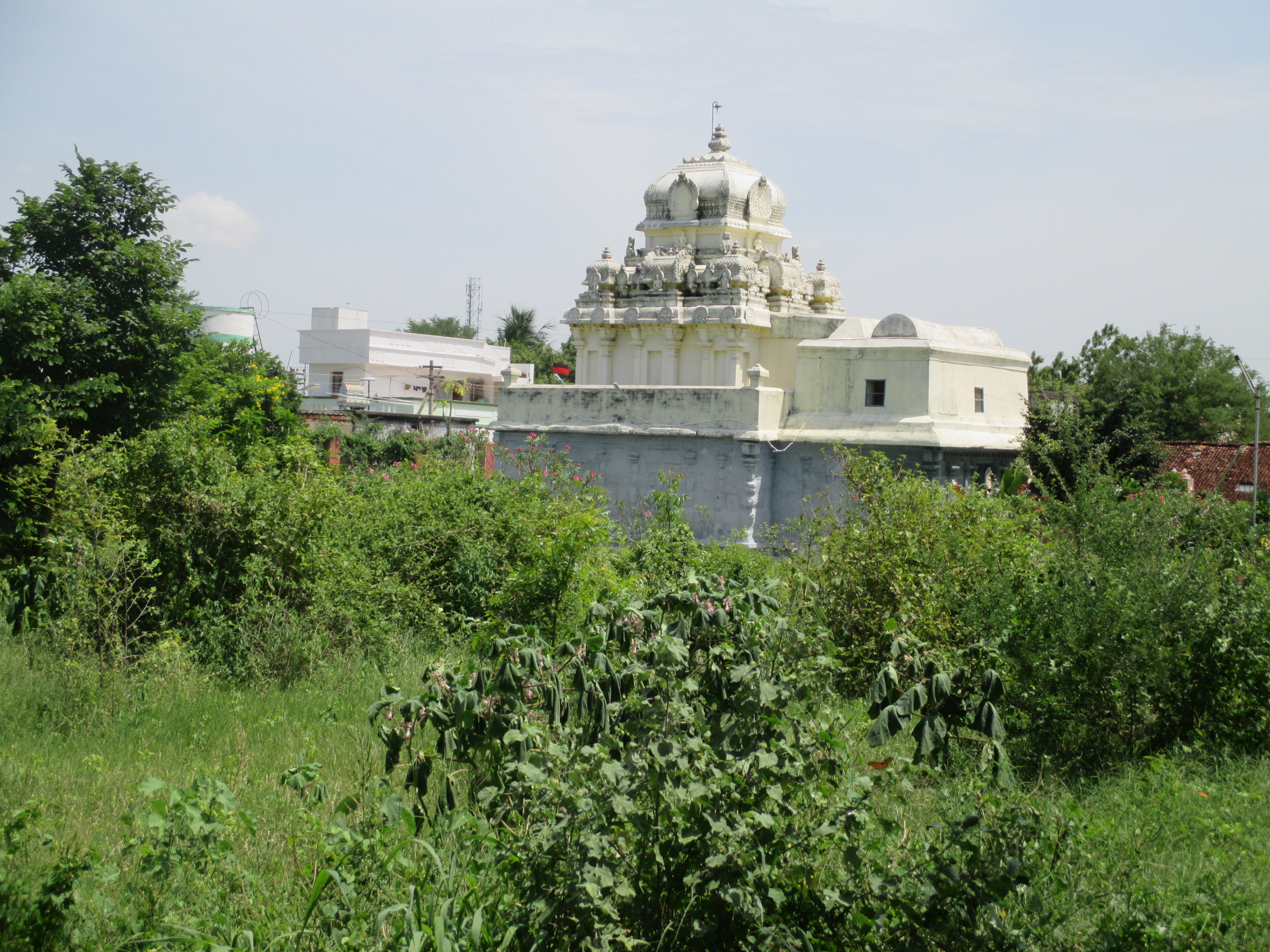
Chandraprabha temple built in 8th century

The Chandraprabha temple is located near the Trilokyanatha Temple. The temple was constructed by Nandivarman II (730 to 796 CE) of the Pallava dynasty, Both Jain temples in the precinct the region is referred as Jaina Kanchi, along with the other two parts of the town being named Shiva Kanchi and Vishnu Kanchi.

== Culture ==
Trilokyanatha Temple was originally under the control of traditional trustees for 600 years till 1991. From then, the temple is maintained and administered by Department of Archaeology of the Government of Tamil Nadu as a protected monument.

Kanchipuram was once seat of Jainism and a famous centre of learning. As per tradition, the place where the temple is located is called Parutti meaning cotton. The tradition continues in modern times as Kanchipuram is a famous centre of hand-woven silk sarees. The Jain ascetics in the region enjoyed royal patronage and propagated Digambara sect of Jainism.

== See also ==
- List of temples in Kanchipuram
- Jainism in Tamil Nadu
- Karanthai Jain temple
