= Devasena (Jain monk) =

Personal life
- Era: 11th century CE
- Notable work(s): Bhavasangraha, Darsanasara

Religious life
- Religion: Jainism
- Sect: Digambara

Devasena was a Jain monk of the 11th century CE belonging to Mula Sangha. He wrote Bhavasangraha and Darsanasara. Devasena also wrote Ālāpa Paddhati ("The Ways of Verbal Expression"), which was translated into English by Vijay K. Jain in 2024.
