= Five Vows =

Basic code of ethics for Jains

The Five Vows of Jainism include the mahāvratas (major vows) and aṇuvratas (minor vows). Jain ethical code prescribes two dharmas or rules of conduct. One for those who wish to become ascetic and another for the śrāvaka (householders). Five fundamental vows are prescribed for both votaries. These vows are observed partially by śrāvakas (householders) and are termed as anuvratas (small vows). Ascetics observe these five vows more strictly and therefore observe complete abstinence. These five vows are:

- Ahiṃsā (Non-violence)
- Satya (Truth)
- Asteya (Non-stealing)
- Brahmacharya (Chastity)
- Aparigraha (Non-possession)

According to the Jain text Puruşārthasiddhyupāya:

All these subdivisions (injury, falsehood, stealing, unchastity, and attachment) are hiṃsā as indulgence in these sullies the pure nature of the soul. Falsehood etc. have been mentioned separately only to make the disciple understand through illustrations.

— Puruşārthasiddhyupāya (42)

Apart from the five main vows, a householder is expected to observe seven supplementary vows (śeelas) and the final vow of sallekhanā vow.

== Mahāvratas (major vows) ==
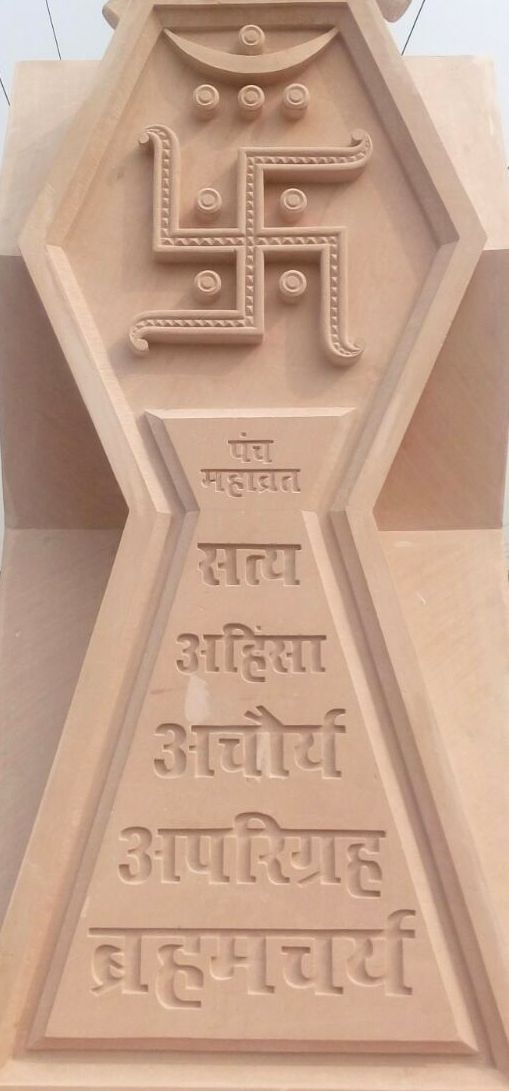
Jain emblem and the "Five Vows"

Mahavrata (lit. major vows) are the five fundamental vows observed by the Jain ascetics. Also known as the "Five Vows", they are described in detail in the Tattvartha Sutra (Chapter 7) and the Acaranga Sutra (Book 2, Lecture 15). According to Acharya Samantabhadra’s Ratnakaraņdaka śrāvakācāra:

Abstaining from the commitment of five kinds of sins (injury, falsehood, stealing, unchastity, and attachment) by way of doing these by oneself, causing these to be done, and approval when done by others, through the three kinds of activity (of body, speech, and thought), constitutes the great vows (mahāvrata) of celebrated ascetics.

— Ratnakaraņdaka śrāvakācāra (72)

=== Ahiṃsā ===
Ahimsa (non-injury) is formalised in Jain doctrine as the first and foremost vow. According to the Jain text, Tattvarthsutra: "The severance of vitalities out of passion is injury."

=== Satya ===
Satya is the vow to not lie, and to speak the truth. A monk or nun must not speak the false, and either be silent or speak the truth. According to Pravin Shah, the great vow of satya applies to "speech, mind, and deed", and it also means discouraging and disapproving others who perpetuate a falsehood.

The underlying cause of falsehood is passion and therefore, it is said to cause hiṃsā (injury).

=== Achourya ===
Also referred to as 'asteya', achourya as a great vow means not taking anything which is not freely given and is taken without permission. It applies to anything even if unattended or unclaimed, whether it is valuable or a worthless thing. This vow of non-stealing applies to action, speech and thought. Further, states Shah, a mendicant must neither encourage others to do so nor approve of such activities.

According to the Jain text, Puruṣārthasiddhyupāya:

Driven by passions, taking anything that has not been given be termed as theft and since theft causes injury, it is hiṃsā

— Puruṣārthasiddhyupāya (42)

According to Tattvarthasutra, five observances that strengthen this vow are:

- Residence in a solitary place,
- Residence in a deserted habitation,
- Causing no hindrance to others,
- Acceptance of clean food, and
- Not quarreling with brother monks.

=== Brahmacharya ===
Brahmacharya as a great vow of Jain mendicants means celibacy and avoiding any form of sexual activity with body, words or mind. A monk or nun should not enjoy sensual pleasures, which includes all the five senses, nor ask others to do the same, nor approve of another monk or nun engaging in sexual or sensual activity.

=== Aparigraha ===
According to Tattvarthsutra, "Infatuation is attachment to possessions". Jain texts mention that "attachment to possessions (parigraha) is of two kinds: attachment to internal possessions (ābhyantara parigraha), and attachment to external possessions (bāhya parigraha). The fourteen internal possessions are:

- Wrong belief
- The three sex-passions
  - Male sex-passion
  - Female sex-passion
  - Neuter sex-passion
- Six defects
  - Laughter
  - Liking
  - Disliking
  - Sorrow
  - Fear
  - Disgust
- Four passions
  - Anger
  - Pride
  - Deceitfulness
  - Greed

External possessions are divided into two subclasses, the non-living possessions, and living possessions. According to Jain texts, both internal and external possessions are proved to be hiṃsā (injury).

=== 25 clauses from the Ācārāṅga Sūtra ===
In Book 2, Lecture 15 of the Ācārāṅga Sūtra, 5 clauses are given for each of the 5 vows, giving a total of 25 clauses. The following is Hermann Jacobi's 1884 English translation of the 25 clauses.

1. I renounce all killing of living beings, whether subtile or gross, whether movable or immovable.
  Nor shall I myself kill living beings (nor cause others to do it, nor consent to it).
  As long as I live, I confess and blame, repent and exempt myself of these sins, in the thrice threefold way, (Note: i.e. acting, commanding, consenting, either in the past or the present or the future.) in mind, speech, and body.
  1. A Nirgrantha is careful in his walk, not careless. (Note: This could also be translated: he who is careful in his walk is a Nirgrantha, not he who is careless.)
    The Kevalin assigns as the reason, that a Nirgrantha, careless in his walk, might (with his feet) hurt or displace or injure or kill living beings.
    Hence a Nirgrantha is careful in his walk, not careless in his walk.
  2. A Nirgrantha searches into his mind (i.e. thoughts and intentions). If his mind is sinful, blamable, intent on works, acting on impulses, (Note: Aṇhayakare explained by karmāsravakāri.) produces cutting and splitting (or division and dissension), quarrels, faults, and pains, injures living beings, or kills creatures, he should not employ such a mind in action. But if, on the contrary, it is not sinful, etc., then he may put it in action.
  3. A Nirgrantha searches into his speech; if his speech is sinful, blamable, intent on works, acting on impulses, produces cutting and splitting (or division and dissension), quarrels, faults, and pains, injures living beings, or kills creatures, he should not utter that speech. But if, on the contrary, it is not sinful, etc., then he may utter it.
  4. A Nirgrantha is careful in laying down his utensils of begging, he is not careless in it.
    The Kevalin says: A Nirgrantha who is careless in laying down his utensils of begging, might hurt or displace or injure or kill all sorts of living beings.
    Hence a Nirgrantha is careful in laying down his utensils of begging, he is not careless in it.
  5. A Nirgrantha eats and drinks after inspecting his food and drink; he does not eat and drink without inspecting his food and drink.
    The Kevalin says: If a Nirgrantha would eat and drink without inspecting his food and drink, he might hurt and displace or injure or kill all sorts of living beings.
    Hence a Nirgrantha eats and drinks after inspecting his food and drink, not without doing so.
2. I renounce all vices of lying speech (arising) from anger or greed or fear or mirth.
  I shall neither myself speak lies, nor cause others to speak lies, nor consent to the speaking of lies by others.
  I confess and blame, repent and exempt myself of these sins in the thrice threefold way, in mind, speech, and body.
  1. A Nirgrantha speaks after deliberation, not without deliberation.
    The Kevalin says: Without deliberation a Nirgrantha might utter a falsehood in his speech.
  2. A Nirgrantha comprehends (and renounces) anger, he is not angry.
    The Kevalin says: A Nirgrantha who is moved by anger, and is angry, might utter a falsehood in his speech.
  3. A Nirgrantha comprehends (and renounces) greed, he is not greedy.
    The Kevalin says: A Nirgrantha who is moved by greed, and is greedy, might utter a falsehood in his speech.
  4. A Nirgrantha comprehends (and renounces) fear, he is not afraid.
    The Kevalin says: A Nirgrantha who is moved by fear, and is afraid, might utter a falsehood in his speech.
  5. A Nirgrantha comprehends (and renounces) mirth, he is not mirthful.
    The Kevalin says: A Nirgrantha who is moved by mirth, and is mirthful, might utter a falsehood in his speech.
3. I renounce all taking of anything not given, either in a village or a town or a wood, either of little or much, of small or great, of living or lifeless things.
  I shall neither take myself what is not given, nor cause others to take it, nor consent to their taking it.
  As long as I live, I confess and blame, repent and exempt myself of these sins, in the thrice threefold way, in mind, speech, and body.
  1. A Nirgrantha begs after deliberation, for a limited ground, not without deliberation.
    The Kevalin says: If a Nirgrantha begs without deliberation for a limited ground, he might take what is not given.
  2. A Nirgrantha consumes his food and drink with permission (of his superior), not without his permission.
    The Kevalin says: If a Nirgrantha consumes his food and drink without the superior’s permission, he might eat what is not given.
  3. A Nirgrantha who has taken possession of some ground, should always take possession of a limited part of it and for a fixed time.
    The Kevalin says: If a Nirgrantha who has taken possession of some ground, should take possession of an unlimited part of it and for an unfixed time, he might take what is not given.
  4. A Nirgrantha who has taken possession of some ground, should constantly have his grant renewed.
    The Kevalin says: If a Nirgrantha has not constantly his grant renewed, he might take possession of what is not given.
  5. A Nirgrantha begs for a limited ground for his co-religionists after deliberation, not without deliberation.
    The Kevalin says: If a Nirgrantha should beg without deliberation, he might take possession of what is not given.
4. I renounce all sexual pleasures, either with gods or men or animals.
  I shall not give way to sensuality, etc. ... and exempt myself.
  1. A Nirgrantha does not continually discuss topics relating to women.
    The Kevalin says: If a Nirgrantha discusses such topics, he might fall from the law declared by the Kevalin, because of the destruction or disturbance of his peace.
  2. A Nirgrantha does not regard and contemplate the lovely forms of women.
    The Kevalin says: If a Nirgrantha regards and contemplates the lovely forms of women, he might fall from the law declared by the Kevalin, because of the destruction or disturbance of his peace.
  3. A Nirgrantha does not recall to his mind the pleasures and amusements he formerly had with women.
    The Kevalin says: If a Nirgrantha recalls to his mind the pleasures and amusements he formerly had with women, he might fall from the law declared by the Kevalin, because of the destruction or disturbance of his peace.
  4. A Nirgrantha does not eat and drink too much, nor does he drink liquors or eat highly-seasoned dishes.
    The Kevalin says: If a Nirgrantha did eat and drink too much, or did drink liquors and eat highly-seasoned dishes, he might fall from the law declared by the Kevalin, because of the destruction or disturbance of his peace.
  5. A Nirgrantha does not occupy a bed or couch affected (Note: This may mean belonging to, or close by.) by women, animals, or eunuchs.
    The Kevalin says: If a Nirgrantha did occupy a bed or couch affected by women, animals, or eunuchs, he might fall from the law declared by the Kevalin, because of the destruction or disturbance of his peace.
5. I renounce all attachments, (Note: This means the pleasure in external objects.) whether little or much, small or great, living or lifeless;
  neither shall I myself form such attachments, nor cause others to do so, nor consent to their doing so, etc. ... and exempt myself.
  1. If a creature with ears hears agreeable and disagreeable sounds, it should not be attached to, nor delighted with, nor desiring of, nor infatuated by, nor covetous of, nor disturbed by the agreeable or disagreeable sounds.
    The Kevalin says: If a Nirgrantha is thus affected by the pleasant or unpleasant sounds, he might fall from the law declared by the Kevalin, because of the destruction or disturbance of his peace.
    If it is impossible not to hear sounds, which reach the ear, the mendicant should avoid love or hate, originated by them.
  2. If a creature with eyes sees agreeable and disagreeable forms (or colours), it should not be attached, etc., to them.
    The Kevalin says: If a Nirgrantha is thus affected by the pleasant or unpleasant forms, he might fall from the law declared by the Kevalin, because of the destruction or disturbance of his peace.
    If it is impossible not to see forms, which reach the eye, the mendicant should avoid love or hate, originated by them.
  3. If a creature with an organ of smell smells agreeable or disagreeable smells, it should not be attached, etc., to them.
    The Kevalin says: If a Nirgrantha is thus affected by the pleasant or unpleasant smells, he might fall from the law declared by the Kevalin, because of the destruction or disturbance of his peace.
    If it is impossible not to smell the smells, which reach the nose, the mendicant should avoid love or hate, originated by them.
  4. If a creature with a tongue tastes agreeable or disagreeable tastes, it should not be attached, etc., to them.
    The Kevalin says: If a Nirgrantha is thus affected by the pleasant or unpleasant tastes, he might fall from the law declared by the Kevalin, because of the destruction or disturbance of his peace.
    If it is impossible not to taste the tastes, which reach the tongue, the mendicant should avoid love or hate, originated by them.
  5. If a creature with an organ of feeling feels agreeable or disagreeable touches, it should not be attached, etc., to them.
    The Kevalin says: If a Nirgrantha is thus affected by the pleasant or unpleasant touches, he might fall from the law declared by the Kevalin, because of the destruction or disturbance of his peace.
    If it is impossible not to feel the touches, which reach the organ of feeling, the mendicant should avoid love or hate, originated by them.

He who is well provided with these great vows and their 25 clauses is really Houseless, if he, according to the sacred lore, the precepts, and the way correctly practises, follows, executes, explains, establishes, and, according to the precept, effects them.

== Aṇuvratas (minor vows) ==
The five great vows apply only to ascetics in Jainism, and in their place are five minor vows for laypeople (householders). The historic texts of Jains accept that any activity by a layperson would involve some form of himsa (violence) to some living beings, and therefore the minor vow emphasizes reduction of the impact and active efforts to protect. The five "minor vows" in Jainism are modeled after the great vows, but differ in degree and they are less demanding or restrictive than the same "great vows" for ascetics. Thus, brahmacharya for householders means chastity, or being sexually faithful to one's partner. Similarly, states John Cort, a mendicant's great vow of ahimsa requires that he or she must avoid gross and subtle forms of violence to all six kinds of living beings (earth beings, water beings, fire beings, wind beings, vegetable beings and mobile beings). In contrast, a Jain householder's minor vow requires no gross violence against higher life forms and an effort to protect animals from "slaughter, beating, injury and suffering".

Apart from five fundamental vows seven supplementary vows are prescribed for a śrāvaka. These include three guņa vratas (Merit vows) and four śikşā vratas (Disciplinary vows). The vow of sallekhanâ is observed by the votary at the end of his life. It is prescribed both for the ascetics and householders. According to the Jain text, Puruşārthasiddhyupāya:

The man who incessantly observes all the supplementary vows and sallekhanâ (together, these are called śeelas) for the sake of safeguarding his vows (vratas), gets fervently garlanded (a gesture to indicate her choice for a husband) by the maiden called 'liberation'.

— Puruşārthasiddhyupāya

The five 'lesser vows' of anuvrata consist of the five greater vows but with less restrictions to incorporate the duties of a householder, i.e. a layperson with a home, he or she has responsibilities to the family, community and society that a Jain monk does not have. These minor vows have the following incorporated into ethical conduct:

1. Take account of the responsibilities of a householder.
2. Are often limited in time.
3. Are often limited in scope.

=== Guņa vratas ===
1. Digvrata – restriction on movement with regard to directions.
2. Bhogopabhogaparimana – vow of limiting consumable and non-consumable things.
3. Anartha-daṇḍaviramana – refraining from harmful occupations and activities (purposeless sins).

=== Śikşā vratas ===
1. Sāmāyika – vow to meditate and concentrate periodically.
2. Deśāvrata – limiting movement to certain places for a fixed period of time.
3. Poṣadhopavāsa – fasting at regular intervals.
4. Atihti samvibhag (or Dānavrata) – Vow of offering food to the ascetic and needy people.

== Sallekhanā ==
An ascetic or householder who has observed all the prescribed vows to shed the karmas, takes the vow of sallekhanā at the end of their life. According to the Jain text, Purushartha Siddhyupaya, "sallekhana enables a householder to carry with him his wealth of piety".

== Transgressions ==
There are five, five transgressions respectively for the vows and the supplementary vows.

Head	Vow	Transgressions
Five vows	Ahiṃsā	Binding, beating, mutilating limbs, overloading, withholding food and drink
Five vows	Satya	Perverted teaching, divulging what is done in secret, forgery, misappropriation, and proclaiming other's thoughts.
Five vows	Asteya	Prompting others to steal, receiving stolen goods, under- buying in a disordered state, using false weights and measures, and deceiving others with artificial or imitation goods.
Five vows	Brahmacharya	Bringing about marriage, intercourse with an unchaste married woman, cohabitation with a harlot, perverted sexual practices, and excessive sexual passion.
Five vows	Aparigraha	Exceeding the limits set by oneself with regard to cultivable lands and houses, riches such as gold and silver, cattle and corn, men and women servants, and clothes.
Guņa vratas	digvrata	Exceeding the limits set in the directions, namely upwards, downwards and horizontally, enlarging the boundaries in the accepted directions, and forgetting the boundaries set, are the five transgressions of the minor vow of direction.
Guņa vratas	bhogopabhogaparimana	Victuals containing (one-sensed) organisms, placed near organisms, mixed with organisms, stimulants, and ill-cooked food.
Guņa vratas	anartha-dandaviramana	Vulgar jokes, vulgar jokes accompanied by gesticulation, garrulity, unthinkingly indulging in too much action, keeping too many consumable and non-consumable objects.
Śikşā vratas	Samayika	Misdirected three-fold activity, lack of earnestness, and fluctuation of thought.
Śikşā vratas	Desavrata	Sending for something outside the country of one's resolve, commanding someone there to do thus, indicating one's intentions by sounds, by showing oneself and by throwing clod, etc.
Śikşā vratas	Prosadhopavâsa	Excreting, handling sandalwood paste, flowers etc., and spreading mats and garments without inspecting and cleaning the place and the materials, lack of earnestness, and lack of concentration.
Śikşā vratas	Atihti samvibhag	Placing the food on things with organisms such as green leaves, covering it with such things, food of another host, envy and untimely food
Sallekhanā vrata	Sallekhanā	Desire for life, desire for death, recollection of affection for friends, recollection of pleasures and constant longing for enjoyment.

== See also ==
- Jain philosophy
- Five precepts
- Five precepts (Taoism)
- Pratima (Jainism)
- Tapas (Indian religions)
- Tapas (Jain religion)
- Yamas
- Five virtues (Sikhism)
