= Redemption (theology) =

Religious concept referring to forgiveness or absolution for past sins

Redemption is an essential concept in many religions, including Judaism, Christianity, and Islam. The term implies that something has been paid for or bought back, like a slave who has been set free through the payment of a ransom.

== Abrahamic religions ==
=== Christianity ===
In Christian theology, redemption (Ancient Greek: Ἀπολύτρωσις, apolutrosis) refers to the deliverance of Christians from sin and its consequences. Christians believe that all people are born into a state of sin and separation from God, and that redemption is a necessary part of salvation in order to obtain eternal life. Leon Morris says that "Paul uses the concept of redemption primarily to speak of the saving significance of the death of Christ."

In the New Testament, redemption and related words are used to refer both to deliverance from sin and to freeing from captivity. In Christian theology, redemption is a metaphor for what is achieved through the atonement; therefore, there is a metaphorical sense in which the death of Jesus pays the price of a ransom (the Latin word redemptio literally expresses the idea of "buying back" - compare Latin emptus - "having been bought or purchased"), releasing Christians from bondage to sin and death. Most evangelical Protestant theologians and denominations reject Origen's argument that God paid the ransom price of redemption to Satan.

Eastern Orthodox eschatology envisages that the Second Coming will involve universal redemption: "Heaven has become our inheritance. [...] Then we shall have the completion of all things, animate and inanimate, material and spiritual; then shall we have the completion of the work of man's redemption."

The term salvation refers to the overall process of being saved, which includes redemption especially but also encompasses other aspects of the Christian faith such as sanctification and glorification.

=== Islam ===
In Islam, redemption is achieved by being a Muslim and doing no action that would forfeit one's identification with Islam, being of sincere faith (iman) and doing virtuous actions. Muslim sinners need to turn to a merciful God in repentance and carry out other good deeds, such as prayer (salah) and charity, for redemption. In certain instances, redemption is also linked to seeking forgiveness from the person that has been wronged by Muslims, and obtaining their forgiveness in addition to seeking forgiveness from God directly. As a result of this view of redemption, Muslims have criticized alternative views on redemption, especially the Christian doctrine of original sin.

=== Judaism ===
In the Torah, there are numerous expressions of the concept of redemption (Hebrew Geulah): The release of land and houses from encumbrance by another person, liberation from slavery, deliverance from distress, the redemption of agricultural produce from the sanctity of tithes, the end of widowhood, deliverance from death, and similar usages.

During the Second Temple period, the concept of geulah developed in new directions, particularly within the apocalyptic literature of the era. Texts such as Daniel, 1 Enoch, and 4 Ezra present redemption as a dramatic, divinely orchestrated transformation of history, often involving cosmic judgment, the downfall of oppressive empires, and the establishment of an eternal kingdom ruled by God or His anointed agent. The Dead Sea Scrolls further illustrate how Jewish groups of the period envisioned redemption as imminent and tied to their own communal purity. Sectarian writings such as the War Scroll (1QM) and the Rule of the Community Scroll (1QS) describe a future redemption led by dual messianic figures: a priestly Messiah and a royal, Davidic Messiah. These sources show that by the late Second Temple period, Jewish expectations of geulah increasingly integrated national restoration, eschatological conflict, resurrection, and universal divine revelation. Scholars point to this era as formative for later rabbinic and medieval models of redemption, which continued to develop themes first articulated in apocalyptic thought.

Although the term geulah refers to several types of redemption, special prominence is given to the redemption of the People of Israel and the coming of the Messianic era, both in the Bible and in the Oral Torah, including the Jerusalem and Babylonian Talmuds, as well as in early midrash literature and in the two central works of Jewish mysticism: the Zohar and Etz Chaim, attributed to the disciple of the Ari, Rabbi Isaac Luria. The anticipation of the redemption of the People of Israel is one of the central obligations in Judaism. It was even established in Jewish halakha as a mitzvah of "service of the heart", meaning prayer. One example of such a prayer is the Amidah, formulated by the Men of the Great Assembly. Redemption is also listed as the twelfth of Maimonides’ Thirteen Principles of Faith. The Jewish understanding of geulah is grounded in belief in God’s attributes, His unlimited power, justice, and mercy. The Torah includes several commandments that, according to Jewish tradition, can only be fulfilled in the era of redemption, such as the sacrificial rites, pilgrimage to the Temple, and various Temple based agricultural and ritual laws. Since Jewish law maintains that commandments cannot be regarded as purely spiritual obligations, classical Jewish sources generally understand redemption not as a purely spiritual state but as a historical and physical reality, involving concrete social, political, and ritual transformations. This understanding forms the basis for later rabbinic, philosophical, and modern debates over the nature and timing of redemption.

==== Rabbinic and modern models ====
Rabbinic literature discusses different models of geulah, distinguishing between a redemption that occurs “in its time” (be’ita בעיתה) and one that is “hastened” (achishena אחישנה). The former refers to a redemption that unfolds according to the natural progression of history, while the latter can occur suddenly through divine intervention. This distinction is reflected in commentaries on biblical prophecy, particularly in the writings of the medieval commentators such as Ramban, who emphasized that human effort (hishtadlut) and divine providence may both play a role in the redemption process. In later Jewish thought, this framework is used to interpret historical events and the emergence of Jewish national movements as part of either gradual or miraculous stages of redemption.

In Rabbinic Judaism, redemption refers to God redeeming the Israelites from their exiles, starting with that from Egypt. This includes the final redemption from the present exile. Certain currents within Zionism, particularly within Religious Zionism, view the national and political revival in the Land of Israel as a major stage in the redemption of the Jewish people. This view builds on earlier rabbinic understandings of redemption as the historical return from exile, while differing over whether contemporary political events should be interpreted as part of that process. These movements do not regard the establishment of the State of Israel as the ultimate fulfillment of redemption, but rather as "the beginning of the flowering of our redemption" (Hebrew ראשית צמיחת גאולתנו), with many further stages yet to occur. The Haredi community disagrees with this approach, maintaining that the redemptive process is to be initiated by the Messiah. In Hasidic philosophy parallels are drawn between the redemption from exile and the personal redemption achieved when a person refines his character traits, although there is no source for this in the Talmud. Rather the Messianic redemption is linked to observing Shabbat, Jewish prayer, and the promise of redemption for those looking toward Mount Zion.

==== Kabbalistic and Hasidic models ====
In medieval Kabbalah, particularly in the Zohar and later in the teachings of Rabbi Isaac Luria (the Ari), the concept of redemption was expanded beyond national restoration to encompass a cosmic process involving the repair of the divine realm itself, while retaining the traditional expectation of a future national and historical redemption. Lurianic Kabbalah describes creation as having undergone a primordial rupture (shevirat ha-kelim, the “shattering of the vessels”), dispersing divine sparks throughout the material world. Geulah is achieved through tikkun: the restoration and reintegration of these sparks, carried out collectively through mitzvot, ethical conduct, and kavanah (spiritual intention). This cosmic framework deeply influenced Hasidic thought, which interpreted redemption both as a national historical event and as an inner spiritual transformation. Early Hasidic masters, such as the Baal Shem Tov and Rabbi Dov Ber of Mezeritch, emphasized that elevating mundane reality through joy, prayer, and devekut (attachment to God) contributes to the redemptive process. Later Hasidic traditions developed distinct emphases: Chabad thought, as articulated by Rabbi Shneur Zalman of Liadi and later by Rabbi Menachem Mendel Schneerson, regards redemption as the revelation of divine unity within the physical world. Breslov teachings emphasize personal renewal, joy, and trust in God as pathways to both individual and collective redemption. While Hasidism maintains the classical Jewish expectation of a future Messianic redemption, its literature frequently stresses that inner spiritual refinement and communal religious vitality are themselves components of the unfolding redemptive process.

==== As a legal concept ====
The concept of redemption in Jewish law (halakha) is primarily legal and transactional, referring to the removal of a person or object from a state of obligation, sanctity, or restricted ownership. It applies to a range of ritual and economic contexts, including Temple related rites, laws governing sale and debt, and the redemption of specific consecrated items such as the Red Heifer. Redemption further applies to real property, including fields and houses, to livestock such as donkeys, to agricultural produce, and to designated ritual objects such as tefillin. In this legal sense, redemption may also involve the release of real property from encumbrance, such as a mortgage.

Redemption likewise applies to persons or groups, including an Israelite slave, an Israelite captive, and the firstborn son through the ritual of pidyon haben (Hebrew: פדיון הבן). In the latter case, a Jewish firstborn son is symbolically redeemed from divine ownership by the transfer of silver coins to a kohen, as prescribed by halakha. It is from these three cases that the concept of exilic redemption is derived because the People of Israel are considered God's 'firstborn' derived from Jacob, who are God's slaves temporarily held in a state of captivity despite their continued covenantal relationship with God.

== Indian religions ==
=== Hinduism ===
A concept similar to redemption in Indian religions is called prāyaścitta, which is not related to the theological sense of sin, but to expiation and personal liberation from guilt or sin. However the end goal of a being is moksha or liberation from karma, resulting in the end of the cycle of birth and death. By attaining moksha, the Atma (self or soul) merges back into Paramatma (God), just as a wave merges back into the ocean.

=== Jainism ===
Like other Indian religions, redemption is more closely related to expiation, but also expects absolution. Pratikramana (lit. '"introspection"'), is a ritual during which Jains repent (prayaschit) for their sins and non-meritorious activities committed knowingly or inadvertently during their daily life through thought, speech or action. Rather than a Prayascitta after perpetrating sin, it is more of a regular conduct, where every possible form of misdeed is recited and repented, if might have been committed, consciously or accidentally. This is also in form of ātma-ālocana ("self-criticism") which is central to Jainism. Vratis and Pratimadharis, including Munis and Aryikas perform Sāmāyika and Pratikramana as a daily essential routine.

== See also ==
- Salvation
- Redemptive suffering
