= Pratima (Jainism) =

Stage marking the spiritual rise of a lay person

In Jainism, Pratima (Sanskrit: प्रतिमा) is a step or a stage marking the spiritual rise of a lay person (shravak). There are eleven such steps called pratima. After passing the eleven steps, one is no longer a sravaka, but a muni (monk).

Rules prescribed for laymen are divided into twelve vrata (vows) and eleven pratimas (steps) and are described in several codes of conduct (shravakacharas).

The pratimas are mentioned in several ancient texts like Uvasagadasao, Samavayanga Sutra, Jayadhavala, Ratnakaranda Shravakachara (2nd century A.D.).

== Twelve vows ==
The twelve vows are:

Head	Vow	Meaning
Five vows	1. ahiṃsā	Not to hurt any living being by actions and thoughts
Five vows	2. satya	Not to lie or speak what is not commendable.
Five vows	3. asteya	Not to take anything if not given.
Five vows	4. brahmacharya	Chastity / Celibacy in action, words and thoughts
Five vows	5. Aparigraha (Non-possession)	Detachment from material property.
Guņa vratas	6. digvrata	Restriction on movement with regard to directions.
Guņa vratas	7. bhogopabhogaparimana	Vow of limiting consumable and non-consumable things
Guņa vratas	8. anartha-dandaviramana	Refraining from harmful occupations and activities (purposeless sins).
Śikşā vratas	9. samayika	Vow to meditate and concentrate periodically.
Śikşā vratas	10. desavrata	Limiting movement to certain places for a fixed period of time.
Śikşā vratas	11. upvas	Fasting at regular intervals.
Śikşā vratas	12. atihti samvibhag	Vow of offering food to the ascetic and needy people

== Eleven Pratima ==
The eleven stages (pratimā) are:

1. Darśana Pratimā (Right perspective): The worship of the true God (i.e., tirthanhara), guru (preceptor) and shastra (Scripture), and the avoidance of gambling, meat-eating, drinking (wine), adultery, hunting, thieving and debauchery.
2. Vrata Pratimā: The keeping of the twelve vows and the vow to observe sallekhana (at the end of one's life)
3. Sāmāyika Pratimā (Periodic meditation): Engaging in meditation or worship on a regular basis.
4. Proṣadhopvas/Poṣadha Pratimā (periodic fasting): This stage involves vowing to fast on every parvan day, which is to fast four times in a month.
5. Sacitta Tyāga Pratimā: This stage includes the renunciation of green leaves and shoots, roots and tubers, and other foods. Additionally, unboiled water is also not allowed to be consumed. At this stage, the spiritual aspirant lives primarily off of lentils and other dried foods.
6. Rātribhukti Tyaga/Rātribhakta Pratimā (or Diva Maithun Tyāga Pratimā): Giving up eating during the night or coitus at night.
7. Brahmacarya Pratimā (celibacy): abstaining from sex or related activity.
8. Ārambha Tyāga Pratimā (giving up occupations): refraining from any activity to earn a living.
9. Parigraha Tyāga Pratimā (giving up possessions): detachment from most possessions.
10. Anurnati Tyāga Pratimā (giving up right to give permissions): refraining from giving orders or expressing consents in the family.
11. Uddiṣṭa Tyāga Pratimā: The complete renunciation of the householder's life, retiring into a forest and adopting the rules laid down for the guidance of monks.

Ashadhara in his Sagara-Dharmammrata (13th century) has groups the 11 steps into three ranks.

- Grahin (jaghanya: first to sixth pratimā)
- Varnin (madhyama: seventh to ninth pratima): At this point the householder is termed a Varni (Kshullak).
- Bhikshuka (uttama: tenth and eleventh pratimā): At this point a person depends on others for daily survival.

Those who have ascended to the eleventh pratima are termed Kshullaka (with two articles of clothing) and Ailaka (with only one piece of cloth) in the Digambara tradition. The eleventh pratima is termed Shramanabhuta Pratima (being almost like a Shramana) in the Śvetāmbara tradition. The next step is that of a full Jain Muni.
