= Sangha (Jainism) =

Term for ascetic communities in Jainism

In Jainism, Sangha (Community of the pious) is a term used to refer to the fourfold community of Muni (male ascetics), Aryika / Sadhvi (female ascetics), Śrāvaka (laymen), and Śrāvikā (laywomen).

The word is also used in various other ways.

== Meaning ==
Champat Rai Jain, an influential 20th century Jain writer described the sangha as "those who practise the dharma", "the community of the saints", "the community of the pious" and as "the community of the faithful".

== Significance ==
According to the Jain texts, the sangha will be maintained till the very end of the present strife-ridden spoke of time (pancham kaal). With the end of the sangha, the dharma (religion) will also end.

The continuity of the sangha (community of the faithful) will be maintained right up to its very end. There will be at least one saint, one nun, one householder, and one pious female follower of the Lord Jinendra in the world. When only three moments will be left in the running kāla, rāja (kingship), agni (fire) and dharma (religion) will be destroyed, one after the other, in the order mentioned! The last king, who will be called Kalki, will snatch away the food from the hand of the last Saint, and will be destroyed by the devas for his extreme impiety. The Saint and the Nun will perform sallekhana death, along with the householder and the pious lay lady. Fire will disappear instantly, and dharma will cease to exist in the next moment!.

— Champat Rai Jain

== See also ==
- Jainism
- Sangha in Buddhism
- Sangat in Sikhism
