= Kshullak =

Junior Digambar Jain monk

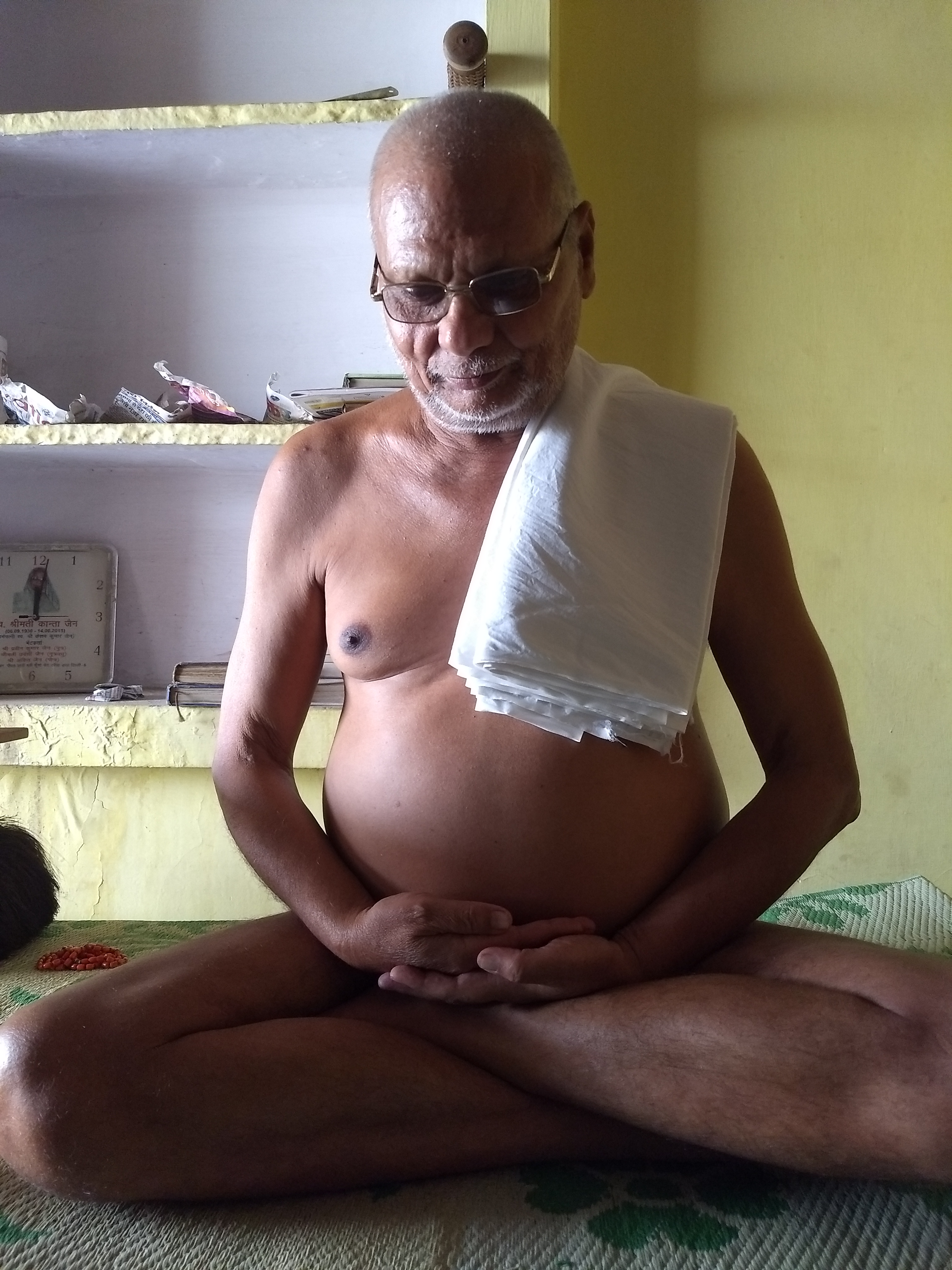
Kshullak Prarabghsagar in Tijara Jain temple

A kshullak (or kshullaka, lit. small or junior) is a junior Digambar Jain monk. A kshullak wears two garments as opposed to a full monk who wears no clothes. Specifically a Kshullaka is a Shravaka of the highest degree at 11th Pratima.

A kshullak is sometimes referred to by the earlier title Varni, even though Varni corresponds to the seventh Pratima.

Well known kshullakas include:

- Kshullaka Ganeshprasad Varni
- Kshullaka Jinendra Varni

A Digambara Jain shravaka at the highest rank of 11th pratima is either a kshullaka or an ailaka. He is just one step below a full muni. His conduct is prescribed in Vasunandi Sravakachara and Lati Samhita.

A kshullaka wears a loin cloth (kaupina) and a white rectangular cloth as a wrap. An ailak uses only a loin cloth.

A kshullaka may live in a house or may be a wanderer. He may eat food placed in his palms, or from a container. He eats once a day. He may beg from a single house or from multiple ones.

A kshullaka may keep a yajnopavita and a shikha. In Jain tradition, Narada muni is assumed to be a Kshullak Jain monk.

Kolhapur in Maharashtra was also once known as Kshullakapur because of the presence of many Jain monks during the Shilahara rule.

== Etymology ==
The Sanskrit term kṣullaka is a late Vedic corruption of an earlier kṣudraka and means "tiny, small, trifling".

== See also ==
- Shramana
