= Śrāvaka (Jainism) =

Jain laity

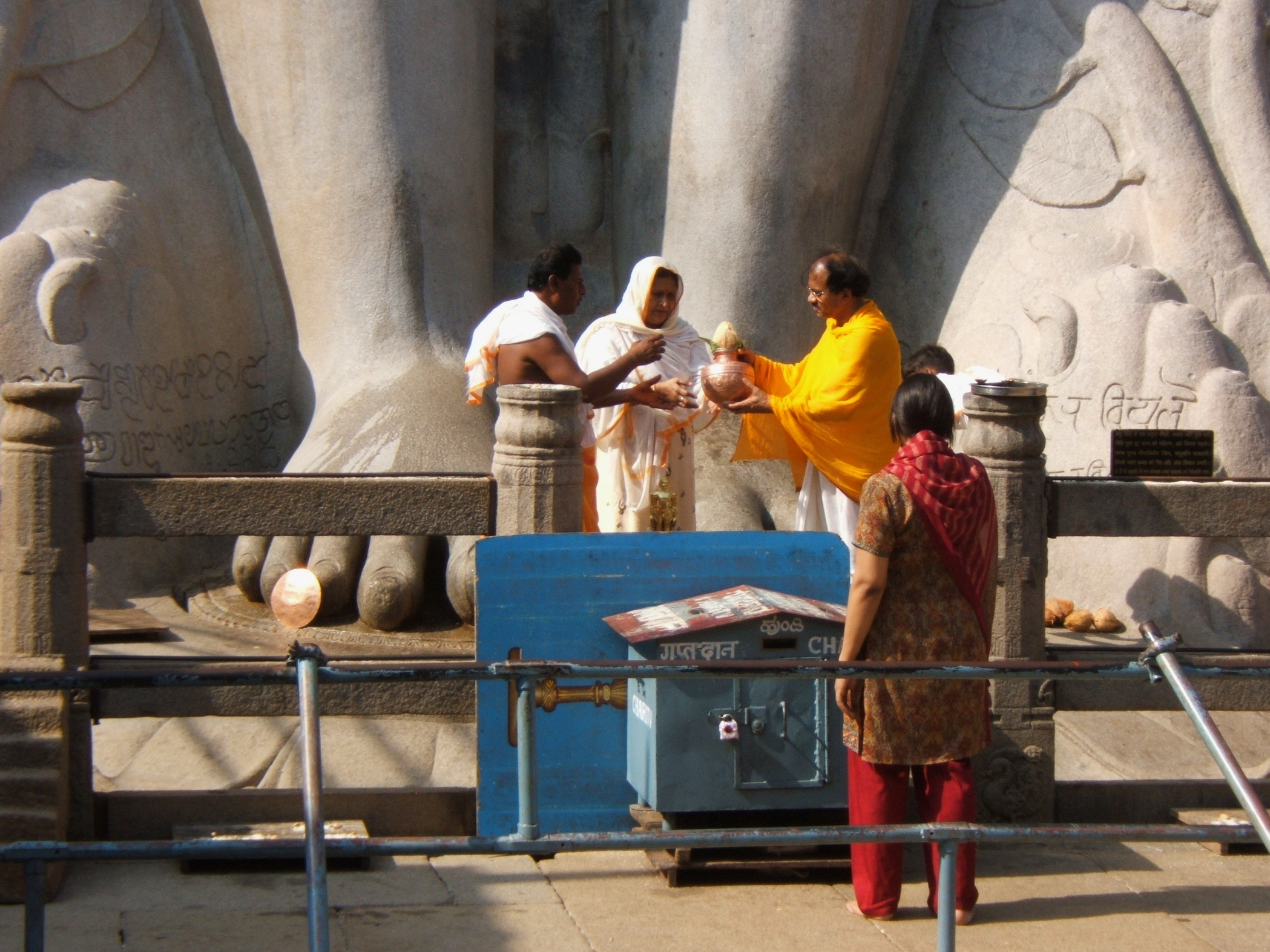
Jain Śrāvaka praying at Gommateshwara statue

In Jainism, the word Śrāvaka or Sāvaga (from Jain Prakrit) is used to refer to the Jain laity (householders). The word śrāvaka has its roots in the word śrāvana, i.e. the one who listens (to the discourses of the saints).

The tirthankara restores or organises the sangha, a fourfold order of muni (male monastics), aryika (female monastics), śrāvakas (male followers) and śrāvikās (female followers).

In Jainism, there are two kinds of votaries:

- The householder (one with minor vows)
- The homeless ascetic (one with major vows).

According to the Jain text Puruşārthasiddhyupāya:

Ascetics who establish themselves in pure and absolute consciousness observe complete abstinence. Those who practice the path of partial abstinence are called Śrāvaka.

— Puruşārthasiddhyupāya (41)

Ratnakaranda śrāvakācāra, a major Jain text, discusses the conduct of a Śrāvaka in detail.

== Six essentials ==
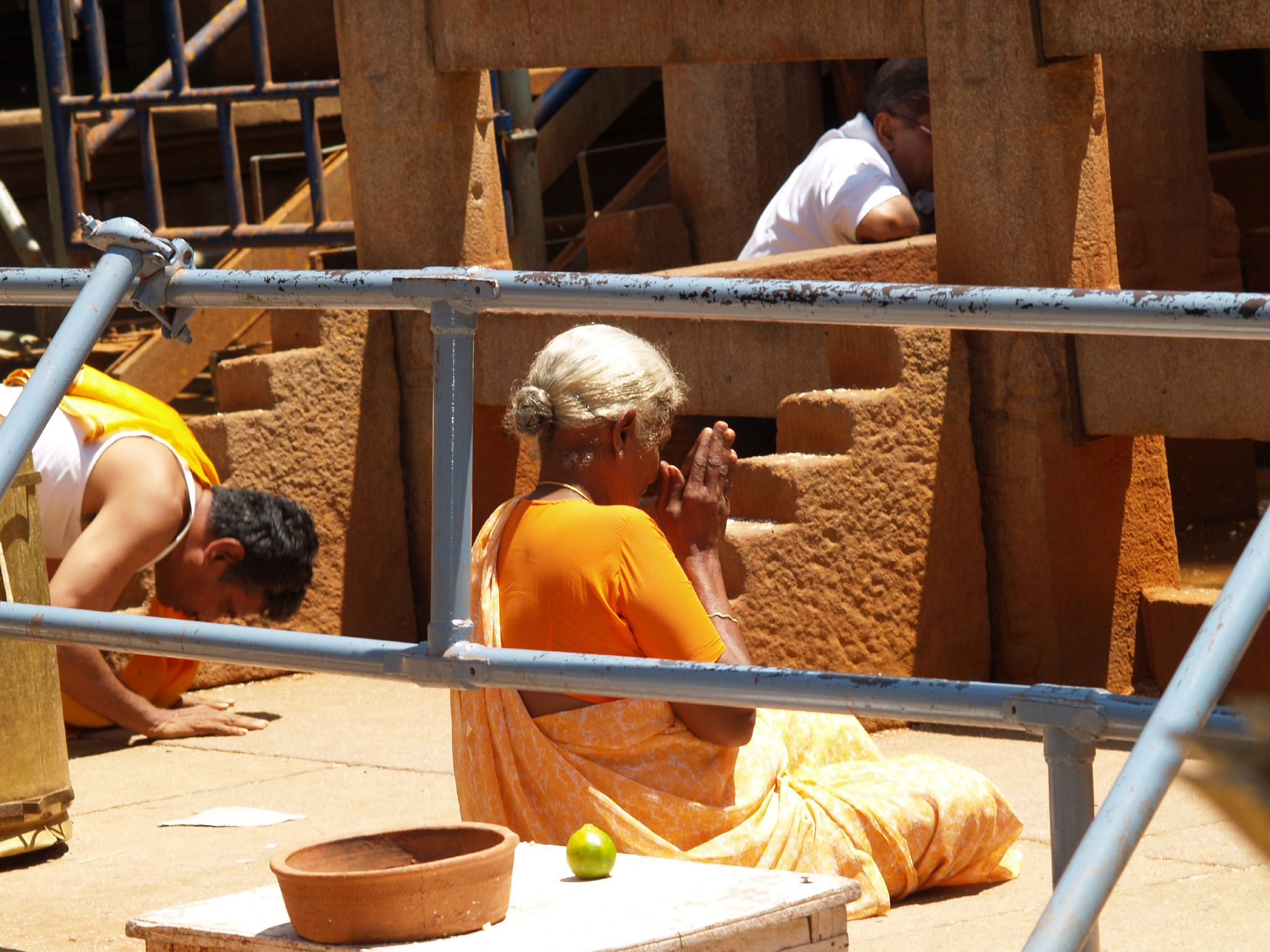
A Jain Śrāvika worshiping

In Jainism, six essential duties (avashyakas) are prescribed for a śrāvaka. These help the laity in achieving the principle of ahimsa which is necessary for their spiritual upliftment. The six duties are:

1. Worship of Pañca-Parameṣṭhi (five supreme beings)
2. Following the preachings of Jain saints
3. Study of Jain scriptures
4. Sāmāyika (Vow of periodic concentration)
5. Following discipline in their daily engagement
6. Charity (dāna) of four kinds:
  1. Ahara-dāna – donation of food
  2. Ausadha-dāna – donation of medicine
  3. Jnana-dāna – donation of knowledge
  4. Abhaya-dāna – saving the life of a living being or giving of protection to someone under threat

== Twelve Vows ==
Jain ethical code prescribes five main vows and seven supplementary vows, which include three guņa vratas and four śikşā vratas.

=== Mahavratas ===
In Jainism, both ascetics and householders have to follow five vows (vratas) compulsorily. These five vows are:

1. Ahiṃsā – refraining from harm: avoidance of harming any living being by one's actions and thoughts. Out of the five types of living beings, a householder is forbidden to kill or destroy intentionally all except the lowest of life-forms (seen as "the one-sensed", such as vegetables, herbs, cereals, etc., which are seen to possess only the sense of touch).
2. Satya – avoidance of lying, or avoidance of speaking that which is not commendable
3. Asteya – Avoidance of stealing: to not take anything if not freely given
4. Brahmacharya (Chastity) – Refraining from indulgence in sexual passions
5. Aparigraha (Non-possession) – Detachment from material property

One who observes the small vows is a householder.

— Tattvartha Sutra (101)

=== Anuvratas ===
==== Guņa vratas ====
- digvrata – Restriction on movement with regard to directions
- bhogopabhogaparimana – Vow of limiting consumable and non-consumable things
- anartha-dandaviramana – Refraining from harmful occupations and activities (purposeless sins)

==== Śikşā vratas ====
- Samayika – Vow to meditate and concentrate periodically. The sāmayika vrata (vow to meditate) is intended to be observed three times a day if possible; otherwise at least once daily. Its objective is to enable the śrāvaka to abstain from all kinds of sins during the period of time fixed for its observance. The usual duration of the sāmayika vow is an antara mūharta (a period of time not exceeding 48 minutes). During this period, which the layperson spends in study and meditation, they refrain from five kinds of sin—injury, falsehood, theft, unchastity and love of material possessions. These are accomplished through any of three designated ways. These three ways are:
1. by an act of mind, speech or body (krita)
2. inciting others to commit such an act (kārita)
3. approving the commission of such an act by others (anumodanā)

In performing sāmayika the śrāvaka has to stand facing north or east and bow to the Pañca-Parameṣṭhi. The person then sits down and recites the Namokara mantra a certain number of times, and finally devotes themselves to holy meditation. Sāmayika can be performed anywhere: a temple, private residence, forest and the like, but the place shouldn't be open to disturbance of any kind.

- Desavrata — Limiting movement to certain places for a fixed period of time.
- Upvas — Fasting at regular intervals
- Atihti samvibhag — Vow of offering food to the ascetics and to the needy

A householder who observes these vows is called viratavirata, i.e., one who observes abstinence as well as non-abstinence.

=== Sallekhanā ===
A householder who has observed all the prescribed vows to shed their karmas, may take the vow of sallekhanā at the end of their life. According to the Jain text, Puruşārthasiddhyupāya, "sallekhana enables a householder to carry with him his wealth of piety". The Sallekhana, a voluntary vow of self-starvation, is performed by reducing one's food and fluid intake; the object is to die while engrossed in meditation, with equanimity of mind. Sallekhana is seen to preserve the loss of good karma and to prevent the further effacing of grief, fear, anger, affection, hatred, prejudice etc. at the end of one's life, after the person's vows and austerities have had their beneficial karma on the world. A Jain who has taken these vows spends much time on prayer and scripture, and is seen to be freed from pleasure and passion.

== See also ==
- Sarak
- Pratima (Jainism)
- Tapas (Indian religions)
- Tapas (Jain religion)
