= Ahimsa in Jainism =

Fundamental principle in Jainism

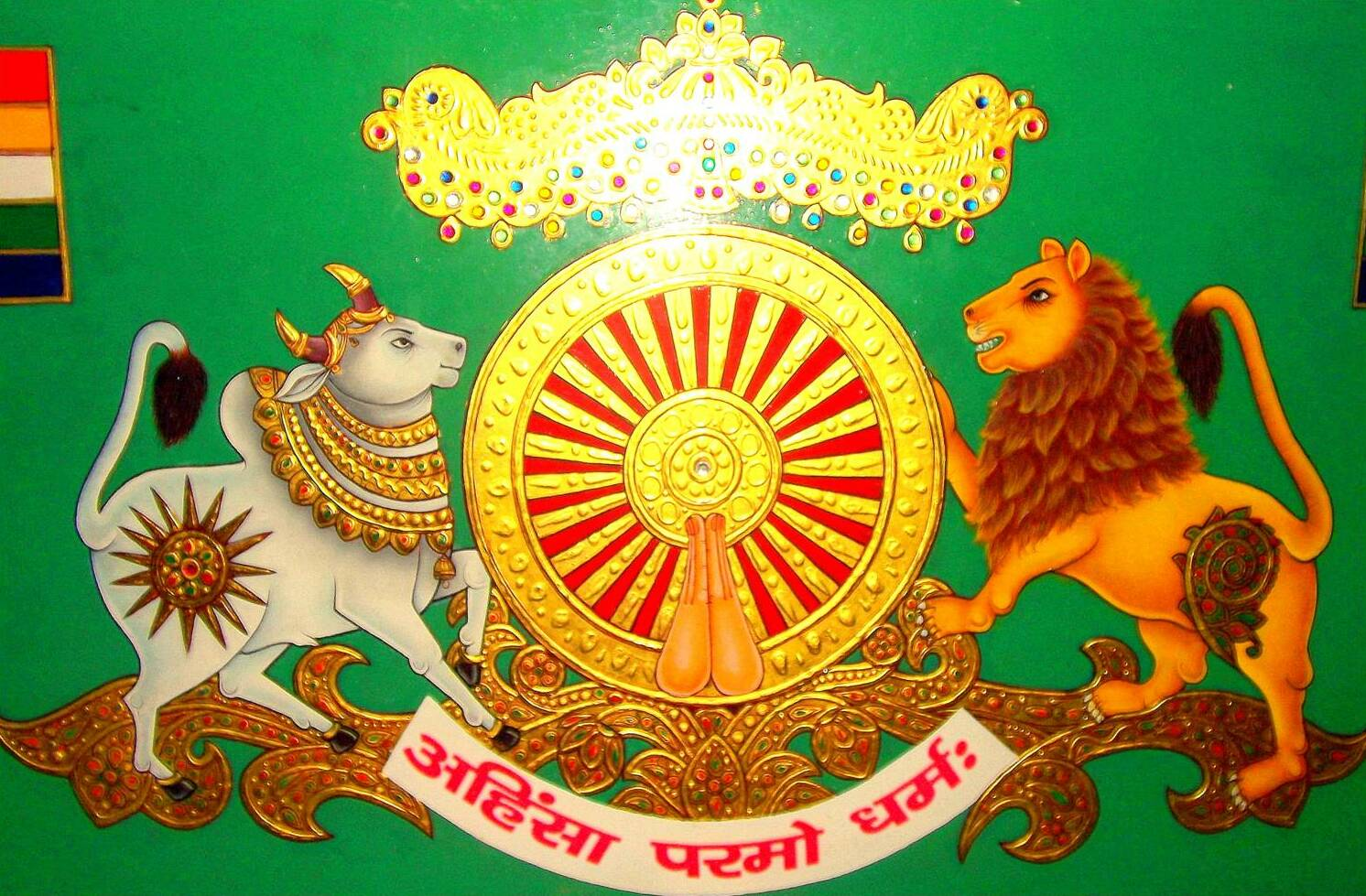
Painting in a Jain temple with the statement "ahiṃsā paramo dharma" (non-violence is the highest virtue/religion/duty)

In Jainism, ahiṃsā (Ahimsā, alternatively spelled 'ahinsā', Sanskrit: अहिंसा IAST: ahiṃsā, Pāli: avihinsā) is a fundamental principle forming the cornerstone of its ethics and doctrine. The term ahiṃsā means nonviolence, non-injury, and the absence of desire to harm any life forms. Veganism, vegetarianism and other nonviolent practices and rituals of Jains flow from the principle of ahimsa. There are five specific transgressions of ahimsa in Jain scriptures – binding of animals, beating, mutilating limbs, overloading, and withholding food and drink. Any other interpretation is subject to individual choices and not authorized by scriptures.

The Jain concept of ahimsa is very different from the concept of nonviolence found in other philosophies. Violence is usually associated with causing harm to others. But according to the Jain philosophy, violence refers primarily to injuring one's own self – behaviour which inhibits the soul's own ability to attain moksha (liberation from the cycle of births and deaths). At the same time it also implies violence to others because it is this tendency to harm others that ultimately harms one's own soul. Furthermore, the Jains extend the concept of ahimsa not only to humans but to all animals, plants, micro-organisms and all beings having life or life potential. All life is sacred and everything has a right to live fearlessly to its maximum potential. Living beings need not fear those who have taken the vow of ahimsa. According to Jainism, protection of life, also known as abhayadānam, is the supreme charity that a person can make.

Ahimsa does not merely indicate absence of physical violence, but also indicates absence of desire to indulge in any sort of violence. Jains have strongly advocated veganism and nonviolence throughout the ages.

== The Metaphysical Foundation: Karma and Spiritual Survival ==
Jain texts expound that there are ten life essentials or life-principles; these are: the five senses, energy, respiration, life-duration, the organ of speech, and the mind. Living beings are classified on the basis of their sensory organs (indriya) and life essentials (praṇa) they possess. According to Jain texts:

- The one-sensed lives possess four essentials – sense organ of touch, strength of body or energy, respiration, and life-duration.
- The two-sensed beings have six, namely the sense of taste and the organ of speech in addition to the former four.
- The three-sensed beings have seven with the addition of the sense of smell.
- The four-sensed beings have eight with the addition of the sense of sight.
- The five-sensed beings without mind have nine life-principles with the addition of the sense of hearing. Those endowed with mind are said to have ten vitalities with the addition of the mind.

According to Tattvarthasutra, one of the most important Jainism scriptures, "the severance of vitalities out of passion is injury". Therefore, the higher the number of senses and vitalities a being has, the more is its capacity to suffer and feel pain. Hence according to Jainism, violence to higher-sensed beings like man, cow, tiger and those who have five senses and the capacity to think and feel pain attracts more karma than violence to lesser-sensed beings like insects, or single-sensed beings like microbes and plants.

Out of the five types of living beings, a householder is forbidden to kill, or destroy, intentionally, all except the lowest (the one-sensed, such as vegetables, herbs, cereals, etc., which are endowed with only the sense of touch). But, the ascetic is required to avoid even injuring the one-sensed form of life to the best of his ability. Hence Jainism enjoins its adherents to completely avoid violence to higher-sensed beings and as far as possible minimise violence to lower-sensed and single-sensed beings. Jains agree with Hindus that violence in self-defence can be justified, and they agree that a soldier who kills enemies in combat is performing a legitimate duty. Jain communities accepted the use of military power for their defence, there were Jain monarchs, military commanders, and soldiers.

== The Vow of Ahimsa: Ascetic and Lay Practice ==
In Jainism, both ascetics and householders (śrāvaka) have to follow five major vows (vratas). Ascetics observe these fives vows more strictly and therefore observe complete abstinence.

1. Ahimsa is formalised into Jain doctrine as the first and foremost vow. The votary must not to hurt any living being by actions, words or thoughts. The Jain text Puruşārthasiddhyupāya deals with the conduct required of the householder (śrāvaka) and therefore discusses the fundamental vow of Ahimsa in detail. There are two types of Ahimsa – Bhaav Ahimsa and Karm Ahimsa. Bhaav Ahimsa is thinking to not hurt someone in the thoughts and intentions whereas Karm Ahimsa is not hurting someone through some actions or words. The text expounds that "all these subdivisions (injury, falsehood, stealing, unchastity, and attachment) are hiṃsā as indulgence in these sullies the pure nature of the soul. Falsehood etc. have been mentioned separately only to make the disciple understand through illustrations."

2. Satya (Truth) – The underlying cause of falsehood is passion and therefore, it is said to cause hiṃsā (injury). According to Jain text Sarvārthasiddhi, translates S.A. Jain, "that which causes pain and suffering to the living is not commendable, whether it refers to actual facts or not is immaterial".

3. Asteya (Non-thieving) – According to Puruşārthasiddhyupāya:

Driven by passions, taking anything that has not been given be termed as theft and since theft causes injury, it is hiṃsā

— Puruşārthasiddhyupāya (42)

4. Brahmacharya – It means chastity for householders and celibacy in action, words & thoughts for ascetics.

Unchastity (abrahma) is copulation arising from sexual desire. There is all-round injury to the living in copulation and, therefore, it is hiṃsā.

— Puruşārthasiddhyupāya(107)

Just as a hot rod of iron inserted into a tube filled with sesame seeds burns them up, in the same way, many beings get killed during sexual intercourse

— Puruşārthasiddhyupāya (108)

5. Aparigraha (Non-possession) – According to Jain texts, attachment to possessions (parigraha) is of two kinds: attachment to internal possessions (ābhyantara parigraha), and attachment to external possessions (bāhya parigraha). The fourteen internal possessions are: Wrong belief, the three sex-passions (male sex-passion, female sex-passion, and neuter sex-passion), also the six defects (laughter, liking, disliking, sorrow, fear, and disgust), and four passions (anger, pride, deceitfulness, and greed). According to Jain texts, "internal possessions are proved to be hiṃsā as these are just another name for himsā". External possessions are divided into two sub-classes, the non-living, and the living. "External possessions, due to the passion of attachment in them, result into himsā."

=== Ascetic practices for adherence to Ahimsa ===
These five vows are called Mahāvratas (major vows) when observed by an ascetic. Ahimsa is the first and foremost of all vows. Jain monks and nuns must rank among the most "nonviolent" people in the world. A Jain ascetic is expected to uphold the vow of Ahimsa to the highest standard, even at the cost of their own life. The other four major vows – truthfulness, non-stealing, non-possession and celibacy – are in fact extension of the first vow of complete nonviolence. (Note: "Ahimsa is the heart of all stages of life, the core of all sacred texts, and the sum (pinda) and substance (sara) of all vows and virtues.")

The ascetic practices of total renunciation of worldly affairs and possessions, refusal to stay in a single place for a long time, continuous practice of austerities like fasting etc. are geared towards observance of Ahimsa. The Jain mendicants abide by a rigorous set of rules of conduct, where they must eat, sleep and even walk with full diligence and with an awareness that even walking kills several hundreds of minute beings. Jain ascetics sweep the ground before them to avoid injuring the most minuscule forms of life. They generally brush the ground clear of insects before they tread. Digambara monks do not wear any clothes and eat food only when it is not prepared for themselves. Ascetics of the Śvētāmbara tradition wear a small mask to avoid taking in tiny insects. The observation of three guptis or the controls of mind, speech and body and five samiti are designed to help the monks in observing the vow of Ahimsa faultlessly. A monk is required to cultivate the habit of carefulness (samti), in respect of the following five particulars:

1. walking, so as not to injure any living being;
2. speech, so as not to cause pain to any one by offensive, disagreeable language, or by a careless use of words having a tendency to incite others to violent deeds;
3. eating, so as not to cause injury to any living being;
4. handling things – the water gourd, books and the feather whisk, with which there is a great danger of injury to small insects; and
5. evacuation and disposal of faeces, urine, and the like.

The entire day of a Jain monk is spent in ensuring that he observes his vow of ahimsa through mind, body and speech faultlessly. This seemingly extreme behaviour of the monks comes from a sense that every action, no matter however subtle, has a karmic effect which can bind soul and inhibit liberation, especially those that result in hiṃsā (injury).

=== Householders adherence to the vow ===
A Jain layman, on account of his household and occupational compulsions, is unable to adhere to the five major vows of ascetic. Hence he observes aṇuvrata or minor vows which although are similar to the major vows of the ascetics are observed with a lesser severity. It is difficult to avoid some violence by a lay person to single-sensed immobile beings in the process of occupation, cooking, self-defense etc. That is why he vows not to kill without a necessary purpose and determined intention, a moving sentient being, when it is innocent. Tying up, injuring, mutilating, burdening with heavy load and depriving from food and drinks any animal or human being, with one's mind polluted by anger and other passions are the five aticāra or transgressions of the vow of ahimsa. However, it is to be understood that ultimately, there is limited spiritual progress and no emancipation unless the major vows are adhered to.

Jainism is perhaps the only religion in the world that requires all its adherents to follow a strict vegetarian diet. Vegetarian food that also involves more harm to the living beings such as roots, bulbs, multi seeded vegetables etc. are avoided by strict Jains. The importance of ahimsa manifests in many other ways in the daily life of Jains. For a layperson it means participating in business that results in least amount of violence to living beings. No furs, plumes or silk are worn. Use of leather is kept to a minimum and must in any event be from naturally dead animals. Food is usually eaten during the day unless unavoidable, since there is too much danger of injuring insects in cooking at night. The Jain will not use an open light nor leave a container of liquid uncovered lest a stray insect be destroyed; even with this precaution, liquids are always strained before use. Through the ages Jains have sought to avoid occupations that unavoidably entail injury, and this accounts for the disproportionate number who have entered banking, commerce and other mercantile trades.

=== Transgressions ===
Jain texts list down five transgressions of the vow of ahimsa:

1. Tying up animals too tightly
2. Beating them mercilessly
3. Cutting their limbs
4. Overloading them
5. Neglecting to feed them properly

A king who fights in defending his empire, however, does not violate the vow of ahimsa, for his motive is to protect his subjects. The same is the case with the judge who punishes to maintain law and order.

== Philosophical Nuance and Analysis ==
=== Important constituents ===
While Jainism enjoins observance of total nonviolence by the ascetics, it is often argued that the man is constantly obliged to engage in destructive activities of eating, drinking, breathing and surviving in order to support his body. According to Jainism, life is omnipresent with infinite beings including microorganisms pervading each and every part of the universe. Hence it may still be possible to avoid killing of gross animals, but it is impossible to avoid killing of subtle microorganisms in air and water, plant life and various types of insects that may be crushed by walking.

However, the Jain conception of ahimsa is quite different from what is commonly understood by violence. The violence is defined more by the motives and the consequences to the self rather than by the act itself. Furthermore, according to Jain Scriptures, destruction of less developed organism brings about lesser karmas than destruction of developed animals and karmas generated in observance of religious duties faultlessly disappears almost immediately. Hence, it is possible to observe complete nonviolence with right knowledge, even when some outward violence occurs to living beings in the course of performing religious duties by observing carefulness and pure mental disposition without any attachment.

==== Carefulness ====
According to Jainism, a monk who is careless in his activities is guilty of violence irrespective of whether a living being remains alive or dies; on the other hand, the person who is ever vigilant and careful in observing the samitis experiences no karmic bondage simply because some violence may have taken place in connection with his activities. Carefulness came to be seen as a defence for the monks against violence in Jainism. Tattvārthasūtra defines hiṃsā or violence simply as removal of life by careless activity of mind, body and speech. Thus action in Jainism came to be regarded as truly violent only when accompanied by carelessness.

==== Mental states and intention ====
Ahimsa does not merely indicate absence of physical violence, but also indicates absence of desire to indulge in any sort of violence. Jains have strongly advocated vegetarianism and nonviolence throughout the ages. Ahimsa being central to the Jain philosophy, Jain Ācāryas have produced, through ages, quite elaborate and detailed doctrinal materials concerning its various aspects. Paul Dundas quotes Ācārya Jinabhadra (7th century), who shows that the omnipresence of life-forms in the universe need not totally inhibit normal behaviour of the ascetics:

It is the intention that ultimately matters. From the real point of view, a man does not become a killer only because he has killed or because the world is crowded with souls, or remain innocent only because he has not killed physically. Even if a person does not actually kill, he becomes a killer if he has the intention to kill; while a doctor has to cause pain but is still non-violent and innocent because his intention is pure, for it is the intention which is the deciding factor, not the external act which is inconclusive.

Thus pure intention along with carefulness was considered necessary to practice Ahimsa as Jains admitted that even if intention may be pure, careless activities often resulted in violence unknowingly.

==== Knowledge ====
The Jains also considered right knowledge as a prerequisite for practising Ahimsa. It is necessary to know what is living and what is non-living to practice Ahimsa faultlessly. A person who is confused between Living and non-living can never observe non-violence. Daśavaikālika Sūtra declared:

First knowledge, then compassion. Thus does one remain in full control. How can an ignorant person be compassionate, when he cannot distinguish between the good and the evil?

It further declares:

Knowledge of living and non-living alone will enable one to become compassionate towards all living creatures. Knowing this all aspirants, proceed from knowledge to eternal virtues. What can an ignorant do? How does he know what is noble and what is evil?

The knowledge is also considered necessary to destroy Karmas. Samaṇ Suttaṁ declared:

The ignorant cannot destroy their Karmas by their actions while the wise can do it by their inaction i.e. by controlling their activities because they are free from greed and lustful passions and do not commit any sin as they remain contented

— 165

=== Anekantavada ===
Anekantavada is the principle of relativity of truth or the doctrine of multiple aspects. Jains hold that truth is multifaceted and has multiple sides that cannot be completely comprehended by anyone. Anekantavada describes the world as a multifaceted, ever-changing reality with an infinity of viewpoints relative to the time, place, nature and state of one who is the viewer and that which is viewed. What is true from one point of view is open to question from another. Absolute truth cannot be grasped from any particular viewpoint alone, because absolute truth is the sum total of all different viewpoints that make up the universe. Because it is rooted in these doctrines, Jainism cannot exclusively uphold the views of any individual, community, nation, or species. It recognises inherently that other views are valid for other peoples, and for other life-forms. This perception leads to the doctrine of syadvada or sevenfold predication stating the truth from different viewpoints. Anekantvada is the doctrine and Syadvada is its expression. According to Jaina philosophers all important philosophical statements should be expressed in this sevenfold way in order to remove the danger of dogmatism (ekanta) in philosophy.

The concept of syadvada allows the Jains to accept the truth in other philosophies from their perspectives, thus inculcating a tolerance for other viewpoints. Anekantvada is non-absolutist and stands firmly against all dogmatisms, even including any assertion that only Jainism is the right religious path.

=== Dravya hiṃsā and bhāva hiṃsā ===
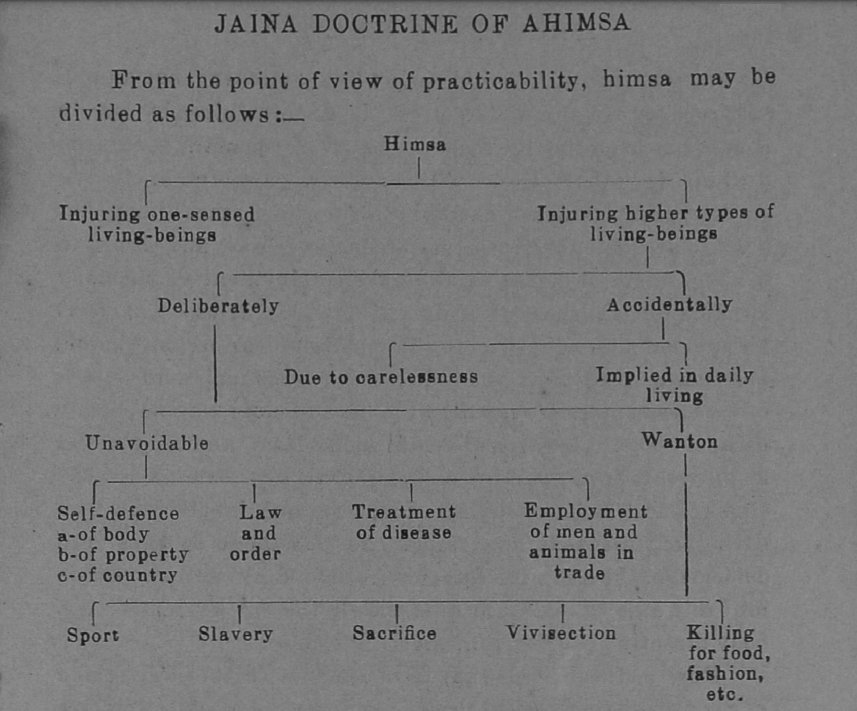
Categorization of hiṃsā, drawn by Champat Rai Jain in 1933

=== Types of violence ===
While the Jain ascetics observe absolute nonviolence, so far as a Jain householder is concerned, the violence is categorised as follows:

1. Sankalpinī hiṃsā or intentional violence – Intentional violence knowingly done is the worst form of violence and is a transgression of the layperson's vow of nonviolence. Examples of sankalpinī hiṃsā are killing for hunting, amusement or decoration, or butchering for food or sacrifice or killing or hurting out of enmity, malice or mischief. sankalpinī hiṃsā has to be totally renounced by a householder.
2. Virodhinī hiṃsā or Self-defence – One is allowed to practice self-defense against a robber, murderer, or any other criminal. This self-defense is necessary when evil attacks.
3. Āṛambhinī (Graharambhi) hiṃsā or domestic or household violence – This violence is unavoidably committed in the course of preparing food, household cleanliness, washing, construction of houses, wells, etc.
4. Udyoginī hiṃsā or Occupational Violence – This violence is connected to occupational undertakings like agriculture, building and operating industries, etc.

While sankalpinī hiṃsā has to be avoided at all costs, the other three types of hiṃsā, although unavoidable in some cases, should not exceed the strict requirements of fulfilling the duties of a householder. Furthermore, they should not be influenced by passions such as anger, greed, pride and deceit or they take the character of sanpalkinī hiṃsā.

=== Ways of committing violence ===
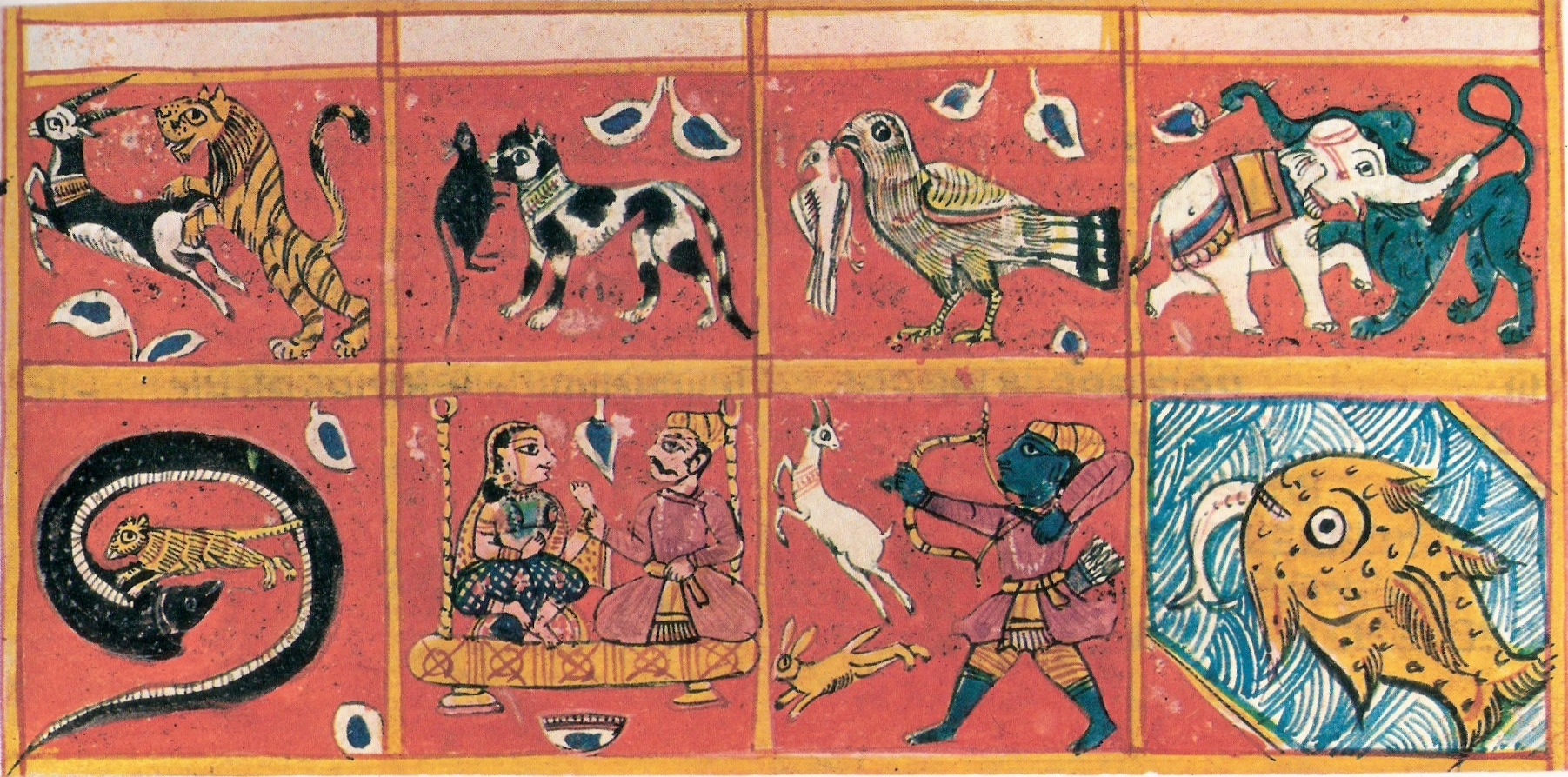
Violence (Himsa) gouache on paper, 17th century, Gujarat depicts animals of prey with their victims. The princely couple symbolises love, which is another occasion of violence.

It would be wrong, however, to conclude that Ahimsa only prohibits physical violence. An early Jain text says: "With the three means of punishment – thoughts, words, deeds – ye shall not injure living beings." In fact, violence can be committed by combination of the following four factors:

1. The instrumentality of our actions. We can commit violence through

a. body i.e. physical action,
b. speech i.e. verbal action, or
c. mind i.e. mental actions

2. The process of committing violence. This includes whether

a. we only decide or plan to act,
b. we make preparations for the act e.g. like collecting necessary materials or weapons, or
c. we actually begin the action

3. The modality of our action, whether

a. we ourselves commit violence,
b. we instigate others to carry out the violence, or
c. we give our silent approval for the violence

4. The motivation for action. This includes which of the following negative emotions motivate the violence.

a. Anger
b. Greed
c. Pride
d. Manipulation or deceit

In Jainism, "non-manifestation of passions like attachment is non-injury (Ahimsa), and manifestation of such passions is injury (himsa)." This is termed as the essence of the Jaina Scriptures.

== The rationale of nonviolence ==
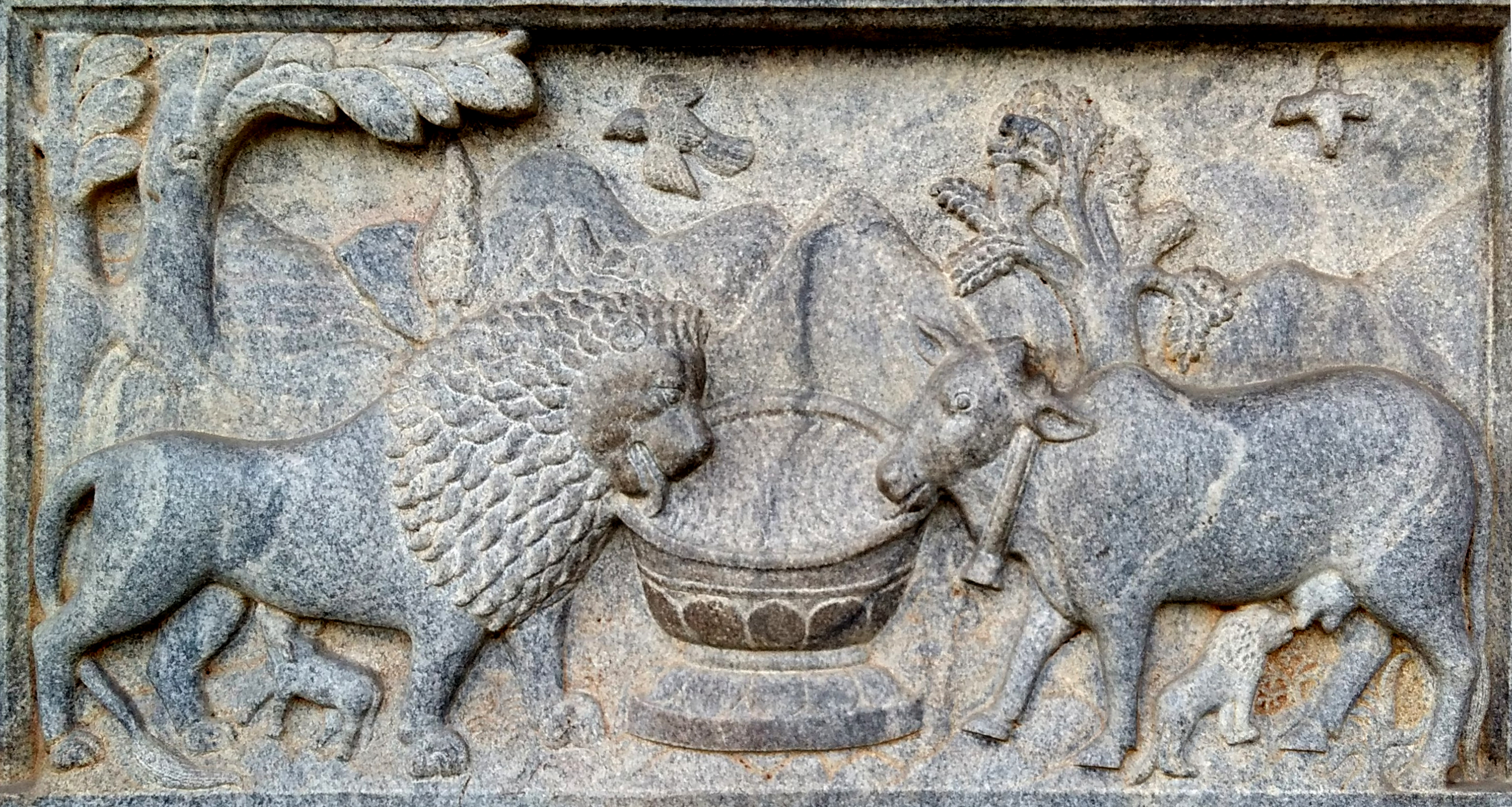
Sculpture depicting the statement "ahimsā paramo dharma" (Photo: Ahinsa Sthal, Delhi)

According to Jainism, the purpose of nonviolence is not because it is a commandment of a God or any other supreme being. Its purpose is also not simply because its observance is conducive to general welfare of the state or the community. While it is true that in Jainism, the moral and religious injunctions were laid down as law by Arhats who have achieved perfection through their supreme moral efforts, their adherence is just not to please a God, but the life of the Arhats has demonstrated that such commandments were conductive to Arhat's own welfare, helping him to reach spiritual victory. Just as Arhats achieved spiritual victory by observing non-violence, so can anyone who follows this path.

Another aspect that provides a rationale to the avoidance of hiṃsā is that, any acts of himsā results in himsā to self. Any act of violence though outwardly is seen to harm others, harms the soul of the person indulging in the act. Thus by an act of violence, a soul may or may not injure the material vitalities known as dravya praṇa of someone else, but always causes injury to its own bhāva praṇa or the psychic vitalities by binding the soul with karmas. It would be entirely wrong to see Ahimsa in Jainism in any sentimental light. The Jain doctrine of non-injury is based on rational consciousness, not emotional compassion; on responsibility to self, not on a social fellow feeling. The motive of Ahimsa is totally self-centered and for the benefit of the individual. And yet, though the emphasis is on personal liberation, the Jain ethics makes that goal attainable only through consideration for others.

Furthermore, according to the Jain karmic theory, each and every soul, including self, has reincarnated as an animal, plant or microorganism innumerable number of times besides re-incarnated as humans. The concept of Ahimsa is more meaningful when understood in conjunction with the concept of karmas. As the doctrine of transmigration of souls includes rebirth in animal as well as human form, it creates a humanitarian sentiment of kinship amongst all life forms. The motto of Jainism – Parasparopagraho jīvānām, translated as: all life is inter-related and it is the duty of souls to assist each other- also provides a rational approach of Jains towards Ahimsa.

In conclusion, the insistence of ahimsa is both about non-injury to others as it is about non-injury and spiritual welfare of the self. The ultimate rationale of ahimsa is fundamentally about karmic results of the hiṃsā on self and the society and not just a dogmatic principle or commandment.

== Ahimsa in Practice: The Daily Disciplines ==
The Jain vegetarian diet is practised by the followers of Jain culture and philosophy. It is considered one of the most rigorous forms of a spiritually motivated diet on the Indian subcontinent and beyond. The Jain cuisine is completely vegetarian, and it also excludes potatoes, onions and garlic, like the shojin-ryori cuisine of Japan.

According to Amṛtacandra Sūri:

"Those who wish to renounce hiṃsā must, first of all, make effort to give up the consumption of wine, flesh, honey, and the five udumbara fruits (the five udumbara trees are Gular, Anjeera, Banyan, Peepal, and Pakar, all belonging to the fig class).

— Puruṣārthasiddhyupāya (61)

The strictest forms of Jain diet are practised by the monastic ascetics. It also excludes potatoes and other root vegetables. The scrupulous and thorough way of applying nonviolence to everyday activities, and especially to food, shapes their entire lives and is the most significant hallmark of Jain identity. For Jains, lacto-vegetarianism (generally known simply as vegetarianism in India) is mandatory. Food which contains even small particles of the bodies of dead animals or eggs is absolutely unacceptable. Some Jain scholars and activists support veganism, as the industrial production of dairy products involves violence against cows. Strict Jains don't eat root vegetables such as potatoes, onions, roots and tubers. This is so because tiny life forms are injured when the plant is pulled up and because the bulb is seen as a living being, as it is able to sprout. Also, consumption of most root vegetables involves uprooting and killing the entire plant, in contrast to consumption of most other terrestrial vegetables, upon which the plant lives on after plucking the vegetables (or it was seasonally supposed to wither away anyway). Mushrooms, fungi and yeasts are forbidden because they are parasites, grow in non-hygienic environments, and may harbour other life forms. Alfalfa is the only known plant that contains vitamin D_{2}, which they may use directly or make vitamin D_{2} supplements from. Honey is forbidden, as its collection would amount to violence against the bees. Jains are also not supposed to consume food left overnight because of contamination by microbes. Most Jain recipes substitute for potato with plantain.

== Misconceptions ==
The Jain scriptures discuss various misconceptions that are harboured in case of Ahimsa. They often oppose the Vedic beliefs in sacrifices and other practices that justified violence in various ways. Ācārya Amritacandra's Puruṣārthasiddhyupāya discuss these wrong beliefs at length to alert the Jain laity to them. These misconceptions are as follows.

=== Animal sacrifices ===
The belief that animals were created for yajna (sacrifice) and hence it was not considered a slaughter, as it elevated not only the person making the sacrifice, but also the animals was also denounced by the Jains. Ācārya Amṛtacandra of Puruṣārthasiddhyupāya condemned this practice by stating that it is a misconception to hold that Gods are pleased at sacrifices of living beings and there is no wrong in committing hiṃsā for the sake of religion.

Ācārya Amṛtacandra says that animals should not be killed for guests or persons deserving respect as often advocated in certain scriptures. It is also a wrong belief that wild animals that kill many other animals should be killed. This is often justified in the name of hunting of ferocious animals like tigers for sport. Another wrong belief forwarded to justify killing of ferocious animals is that, these kill many lives and accumulate grave sins and hence killing them is an act of mercy. According to Jainism, killing can never be an act of mercy. It is also a misconception to believe that it is advisable to kill those who are suffering so that they may get relief from agony. These sorts of arguments are forwarded to justify killing of those animals that may have become old or injured and hence have become commercially useless.

=== Wrong Beliefs ===
Other wrong beliefs are killing those who are in state of happiness or those who are in meditation under wrong belief that the mental state at the time of death will be perpetuated in future lives. It is also a wrong belief that killing of self and others is justified as the soul that is imprisoned in the body will be permanently released and achieve salvation.

== Fruits of nonviolence ==
According to Jain texts, the fruits of himsā (violence) depends upon the severity of passions at the time of commencement of such an act. One may be responsible for the sinful act of himsā without actually causing injury; the other, while having caused injury, may not be responsible for the act. Also, when two persons commit the act of himsā jointly, its consequences on fruition (of karma) may be grave for one person and mild for the other.

According to Jains, the consequences of karma are inevitable. The consequences may take some time to take effect but the karma is never fruitless. The latent karma becomes active and bears fruit when the supportive conditions arise. A great part of attracted karma bears its consequences with minor fleeting effects, as generally most of our activities are influenced by mild negative emotions. However, those actions that are influenced by intense negative emotions cause an equally strong karmic attachment which usually does not bear fruit immediately. It takes on an inactive state and waits for the supportive conditions—like proper time, place, and environment—to arise for it to manifest and produce effects. If the supportive conditions do not arise, the respective karmas will manifest at the end of maximum period for which it can remain bound to the soul. These supportive conditions for activation of latent karmas are determined by the nature of karmas, intensity of emotional engagement at the time of binding karmas and our actual relation to time, place, surroundings. There are certain laws of precedence among the karmas, according to which the fruition of some of the karmas may be deferred but not absolutely barred.

== Modern reception ==
Ahimsa, an important tenet of all the religions originating in India, is now considered as an article of faith by the adherents of the Indian religions.

Mahatma Gandhi was of the view:

No religion in the World has explained the principle of Ahimsa so deeply and systematically as is discussed with its applicability in every human life in Jainism. As and when the benevolent principle of Ahimsa or non-violence will be ascribed for practice by the people of the world to achieve their end of life in this world and beyond. Jainism is sure to have the uppermost status and Lord Mahavira is sure to be respected as the greatest authority on Ahimsa.

Prime Minister of India Narendra Modi wrote the Jain slogan, Ahimsa parmo dharma, on Facebook's Real Wall at its headquarters, when he visited for a town hall question-and-answer session in September 2015.
