= Puruṣārthasiddhyupāya =

Jain text authored by Āchārya Amritchandra

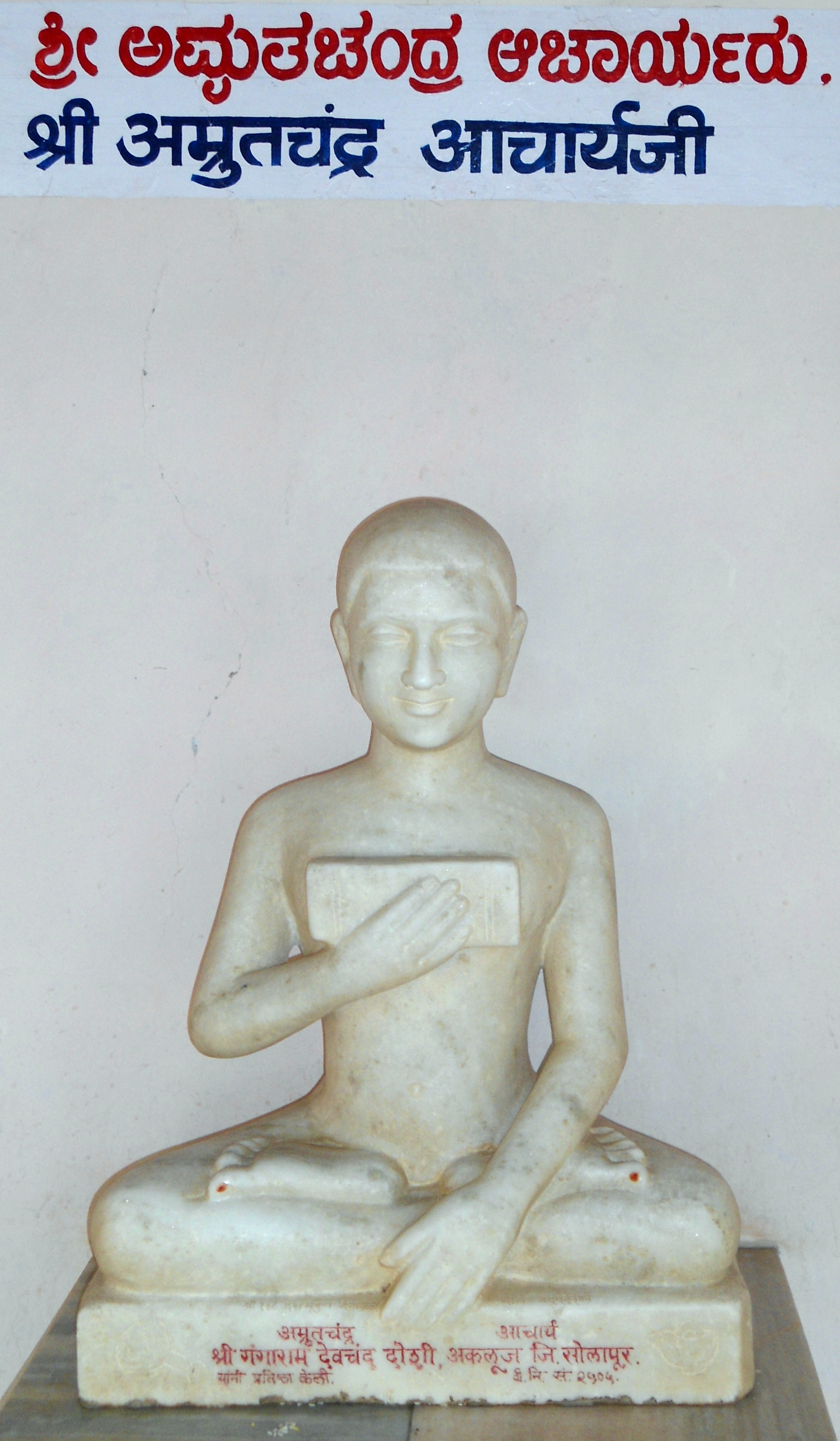
- Image of Acharya Amritchandra, author of Puruşārthasiddhyupāya

Information
- Religion: Jainism
- Author: Amritchandra
- Period: 10th Century CE

Puruṣārthasiddhyupāya is a major Jain text authored by Amritchandra. Acharya Amritchandra was a Digambara monk who lived in the tenth century (Vikram Samvat). Puruṣārthasiddhyupāya deals with the conduct of householder (śrāvaka) in detail. Another major Jain text that deals with householder's conduct is Ratnakaranda śrāvakācāra. Puruṣārthasiddhyupāya also deals extensively with the Jain concept of ahiṃsā.

== Content ==
Like in all Jain texts, the first verse (śloka) of Puruṣārthasiddhyupāya is an invocation:

Victory to the Supreme Effulgence (Omniscience – the infinite and all-embracing knowledge) that images, as it were in a mirror, all substances and their infinite modes, extending through the past, the present, and the future.

== Ahimsā ==
Puruṣārthasiddhyupāya deals extensively with the Jain concept of ahimsā (refraining from causing harm) particularly in reference to its observance as a minor vow (anuvrata) by the śrāvaka. In Verse 43, deliberate himsā (causing harm) is defined as "harm caused to physical or psychical vitalities when acting under the influence of passions" (verse 43). Amritchandra then elaborates on the observances that help the householder in abiding by his minor vow of ahimsā.

Eleven verses (79-89), cautions the householder regarding certain misconstrued notions that people put forward to justify their acts of himsā.

== See also ==
- Tattvartha Sutra
