= Non-possession =

Philosophy that holds that no one or anything possesses anything

Non-possession (Sanskrit: अपरिग्रह, aparigraha) is a religious tenet followed in Buddhist, Hindu, and Jain traditions in South Asia. In Jainism, aparigraha is the virtue of non-possessiveness, non-grasping, or non-greediness.

Aparigraha is the opposite of parigraha. It means keeping the desire for possessions to what is necessary or important, which depends on one's life stage and context. The precept of aparigraha is a self-restraint (temperance) from the type of greed and avarice where one's own material gain or happiness comes by hurting, killing, or destroying other human beings, life forms, or nature.

Aparigraha is related to and in part a motivator of dāna (proper charity), both from giver's and receiver's perspective.

Non-possession is one of the principles of satyagraha, a philosophical system based on various religious and philosophical traditions originating in India and Asia Minor, and put into practice by Mahatma Gandhi as part of his nonviolent resistance. This particular iteration of aparigraha is distinct because it is a component of Gandhi's active non-violent resistance to social problems permeating India. As such, its conception is tempered with western law. Non-possession is, by definition, concerned with defining the concept of possession. Gandhi intertwined non-possession and voluntary poverty in application, but living according to the guidelines of non-possession is not the same as living in poverty. In practice, the principle of taking what one needs (rather than less or more than needed), is essential to the viability of non-possession/aparigraha.

== Etymology and meaning ==
Aparigraha is a compound in Sanskrit, made of "a-" and "parigraha". The prefix "a-" means "non-", so "aparigraha" is the opposite of "parigraha"—speech and actions that oppose and negate parigraha.

Parigraha means 'to amass', 'to crave', 'to seek', 'to seize', and 'to receive or accept' material possessions or gifts from others. The word also includes the idea of doing good with the expectation of benefit or reward, not just for the sake of merely doing good. Parigraha includes the results as well as the intent; in other words, it means the attitudes of craving, possessiveness, and hoarding, but also the things that have been acquired because of those attitudes. That aparigraha is a means to liberate the soul from the cycle of birth and death was first asserted by the first tirthankara in Jainism, Rishabhdeva.

Monier-Williams states that the word parigraha has roots in the Vedic texts as well, referring to fencing an altar, enclosing something, assuming or putting on a dress or receiving something. In the Brahmanas and later texts, the term contextually means accepting or taking a gift; acquiring, possessing, claiming, controlling something such a property; assistance; or constraining force on others. In some texts, the root reflects the state of marriage or having a family.

The virtue of aparigraha means characteristically taking what one truly needs and no more. In the Yoga school of Hinduism, this concept of virtue has also been translated as "abstaining from accepting gifts", "not expecting, asking, or accepting inappropriate gifts from any person", and "not applying for gifts which are not to be accepted". The concept includes in its scope non-covetousness and non-possessiveness. Aparigraha includes the psychological state of "letting go and the releasing of control, transgressions, fears" and living a content life unfettered by anxieties.

=== Difference from Asteya ===
Asteya is also one of the five vows taken by Jain ascetic monks. It is the virtue of non-stealing and not wanting to appropriate, or take by force or deceit or exploitation, by deeds or words or thoughts, what is owned by and belongs to someone else. Aparigraha, in contrast, is the virtue of non-possessiveness and non-clinging to one's own property, non-accepting any gifts or particularly improper gifts offered by others, and of non-avarice, non-craving in the motivation of one's deeds, words and thoughts.

== Jainism ==
Aparigraha is one of the virtues in Jainism. It is also one of the five vows that both householders (Śrāvaka) and ascetics must observe. This Jain vow is the principle of limiting one's possessions (parimita-parigraha) and limiting one's desires (iccha-parimana).

In Jainism, worldly wealth accumulation is considered a potential source of greed, jealousy, selfishness, and desires. Giving up emotional attachments, sensual pleasures, and material possession is a means of liberation in Jain philosophy. Eating enough to survive is considered more noble than eating for indulgence. Similarly, all consumption is more appropriate if it is essential to one's survival, and inappropriate if it is a form of hoarding, showing off, or for ego. Non-possession and non-attachment are forms of virtue, and are recommended particularly in later stages of one's life. After ahiṃsā, aparigraha is the second most important virtue in Jainism.

Jainism views attachments to material or emotional possessions as what leads to passions, which in turn leads to violence. Jain texts say that "attachment to possessions" (parigraha) is of two kinds: attachment to internal possessions (ābhyantara parigraha), and attachment to external possessions (bāhya parigraha). The fourteen internal possessions are as follows:

Wrong belief
The three sex-passions	Male sex-passion, Female sex-passion, Neuter sex-passion
Six defects	Laughter, Liking, Disliking, Sorrow, Fear, Disgust
Four passions (kashaya)	Anger, Pride, Deceitfulness, Greed

External possessions are divided into two subclasses: the non-living and the living. According to Jain texts, both internal and external possessions are proved to be hiṃsā (injury).

== Economic and ethical application ==
In the Jain tradition, the principle of non-possession serves as the foundation for a distinct system of business ethics and philanthropy. While the ascetic vow demands the total renunciation of property, the lay vow (Anuvrata) interprets non-possession as the "voluntary limitation of desires" (Iccha-parimana).

=== Merchant ethics ===
Historically, the restriction on agriculture (due to the potential injury to living beings) led the Jain community to specialize in mercantile trades, banking, and law. The ethic of non-possession acted as a stabilizing force within this economic activity; by limiting personal consumption, Jain merchants accumulated surplus capital which was reinvested into the community rather than spent on lavish displays of wealth. This reputation for ethical restraint and creditworthiness allowed Jain merchant guilds (mahajans) to become dominant financial institutions in medieval and colonial India.

=== Philanthropy and stewardship ===
The doctrine links non-possession directly to charity (dāna). Wealth exceeding the limits set by one's Iccha-parimana vow is viewed not as personal property, but as a resource held in trust for the welfare of the wider society. This structural requirement led to the proliferation of Jain-funded libraries (bhandaras), animal hospitals (panjrapoles), and educational institutions, institutionalizing the concept that wealth must be discharged ethically.

== Hinduism ==
In the Yoga Sūtras (II.30), aparigraha is listed as the fifth of the yamas or code of self-restraint, after ahimsa (nonviolence), satya (non-falsehoods, truthfulness), asteya (not stealing), and brahmacharya (chastity in one's feelings and actions).

अहिंसासत्यास्तेय ब्रह्मचर्यापरिग्रहाः यमाः ॥३०॥

Non-violence, Non-falsehood, Non-stealing, Non-cheating (celibacy, chastity), and Non-possessiveness are the five Yamas. (30)

— Patanjali, Yoga Sutra 2.30

Aparigraha is thus one of the five essential restraints (yamas, "the don'ts") in Hinduism, that with five essential practices (niyamas, "the dos") are suggested for right, virtuous, enlightened living. While Yoga Sutras distill the ten yamas and niyamas, these virtues appear, in various discussions, in Vedic texts. It is part of ethical theory in Hinduism.

James Wood states that aparigraha is the virtue of abstaining from appropriating objects because one understands the disadvantages in "acquiring them, keeping them, losing them, being attached to them, or in harming them". Patanjali suggests that greed and coveting material wealth increases greed and possessiveness, a cycle that distracts from good reasons for activity that should motivate a person:

When we start to satisfy desires, new levels of greed or attachment can start to develop. Coupled with steya, parigraha (coveting/hoarding) can lead an individual to lie, steal, cheat, or even murder for the desired item, regardless of the outcome of their actions. Greed is probably the highest act of not practicing aparigraha, since greed generally equates to collecting things well beyond one's immediate or foreseeable future needs.

Restraint from possessiveness and greed, or aparigraha, leads one away from harmful and injurious greed, refraining from harming others, and towards the spiritual state of good activity and understanding one's motives and origins. The virtue of non-coveting and non-possessing is a means of sādhanā, a path of spiritual existence. In the outer world, aparigraha manifests as non-possessiveness with simple living; while in psychological terms, it is a state of non-attachment, non-craving, and contentment.

अपरिग्रहस्थैर्ये जन्मकथंतासंबोधः ॥३९॥

With constancy of aparigraha, a spiritual illumination of the how and why of motives and birth emerges.

— Patanjali, Yoga Sutra 2.39

== Satyagraha ==
Gandhi's view was that possession is more trouble than it is worth:

The possession of anything then became a troublesome thing and a burden. Exploring the cause of that joy, I found that if I kept anything as my own, I had to defend it against the whole world.... And I said to myself: if [other people] want it and would take it, they do so not from any malicious motive but... because theirs was a greater need than mine.

== Relation to charity and conservation ==
Some suggest that aparigraha implies charity (dāna) and conservation. Taking and wasting more of nature, or from others, is inconsistent with the ethical precept of aparigraha.

Scholars suggest aparigraha allies with ideas that inspire environmental and ecological sustainability. Aparigraha suggests the reduction of waste and adds a spiritual dimension to preventing destructive consumption of ecosystems and nature.

== In literature ==
The ancient Tamil moral text Tirukkural speaks about aparigraha in its chapters on renunciation (Chapter 35) and extirpation of desire (Chapter 37), among others.

== See also ==
- Civil disobedience – Nonviolent disobedience of the law
- Cooperative – Autonomous association of persons or organizations
- Gift economy – Mode of exchange where valuables are given without rewards
- Moderation – Process of eliminating or lessening extremes
- Non-profit – Organization operated for a collective benefit
- Non-violence – Principle or practice of not causing harm to others
- Nonviolent resistance – Act of protest through nonviolent means
- Postmaterialism – Concept in sociology
- Property – Entity owned by a person or a group of people
- Socialism – Political philosophy emphasising social ownership of production
