= Brahmacharya =

Motivated abstinence from worldly pleasures

Brahmacharya (/ˌbrɑːməˈtʃɑːrjə/; Sanskrit: brahmacarya Devanagari: ब्रह्मचर्य) is the concept within Indian religions that literally means "conduct consistent with Brahman" or "on the path of Brahman". Brahmacharya, a discipline of controlling the senses, is seen as a way to liberation. Though sexual restraint is a part of brahmacharya, brahmacharya encompasses all striving toward a passionless state.

In one context, brahmacharya is the first of four ashrama (age-based stages) of a human life. The brahmacharya (bachelor student) stage of life – from childhood up to twenty-five years of age – was focused on education and included the practice of celibacy. In this context, it connotes chastity during the student stage of life for the purposes of learning from a guru (teacher), and during later stages of life for the purposes of attaining spiritual liberation or moksha.

In the Hindu, Jain, and Buddhist monastic traditions, brahmacharya implies, among other things, the mandatory renunciation of sex and marriage. It is considered necessary for a monk's spiritual practice.

== Etymology ==
The word brahmacharya stems from two Sanskrit roots:

1. Brahman (Devanagari: ब्रह्म) meaning one's own Self in non-dual schools or a distinct entity in dualistic schools, ultimate unchanging reality, absolute consciousness, much discussed in the Upanishads.
2. carya (चर्य), which means activity, behaviour, conduct.

Hence, brahmacharya roughly means "to stay true to one's Self or one own Atma" or "on the path of Brahman".

In ancient and medieval era Indian texts, the term brahmacharya is a concept with a more complex meaning, indicating a lifestyle conducive to the pursuit of sacred knowledge and spiritual liberation. Brahmacharya is a means, not an end. It usually includes cleanliness, ahimsa, simple living, studies, meditation, and voluntary restraints on certain foods (eating only Sattvic food), intoxicants, and on sexual behavior (both sex and masturbation, in some schools of thought).

One who practices brahmacarya is known as a brahmacārī or brahmacārinī. Various ashrams (आश्रम, transl. hermitage) and mathas (मठ, transl. college of ascetics) of Hinduism also call their initiates by these terms.

== In Hinduism ==
Brahmacharya represents the highest level of self-control, an intense mental and spiritual discipline of controlling the senses to attain liberation. It encompasses renouncing desires for temporary worldly pleasures to focus one's self toward religious goals. Brahmacharya is the oldest form of institutionalized asceticism in India, but less institutionalized than renunciatory asceticism. There is no single ritual of initiation into brahmacharya.

=== In the Vedas ===
The Vedas discuss brahmacharya, both in the context of lifestyle and as a stage of one's life. Rig Veda, for example, in Mandala 10, Sukta 136, mentions knowledge seekers as those kesin (long-haired) and with soil-colored clothes (yellow, orange, saffron) engaged in the affairs of mananat (mind, meditation). Rig Veda, however, refers to these people as Muni and Vati. The Atharva Veda, completed by about 1000 BCE, has more explicit discussion of brahmacharya, in Book XI, Chapter 5. This chapter of Atharva Veda describes brahmacharya as that which leads to one's second birth (mind, Self-awareness), with Hymn 11.5.3 painting a symbolic picture that when a teacher accepts a brahmacārī, the student becomes his embryo.

The concept and practice of brahmacharya is found extensively among the older strata of the Mukhya Upanishads in Hinduism. The 8th-century BCE text Chandogya Upanishad describes, in Book 8, activities and lifestyle that is brahmacharya:

Now what people call yajña (sacrifice) is really brahmacharya, for only by means of brahmacharya does the knower attain that world (of Brahman). And what people call Ishta (worship) is really brahmacharya, for only worshipping by means of brahmacharya does one attain the Atman (the liberated Self). Now, what people call the Sattrayana (sacrificial session) is really brahmacharya, for only by means of brahmacharya does one obtain one's salvation from Sat (Being). And what people call the Mauna (vow of silence) is really brahmacharya for only through brahmacharya does one understand the Atman and then meditate. Now, what people call a Anasakayana (vow of fasting) is really brahmacharya, for this Atman never perishes which one attains by means of brahmacharya. And what people call the Aranyayana (life of a hermit) is really brahmacharya, for the world of Brahman belongs to those who by means of brahmacharya attain the seas Ara and Nya in the world of Brahman. For them there is freedom in all the worlds.

— Chandogya Upanishad, VIII.5.1 – VIII.5.4

A hymn in another early Upanishad, the Mundaka Upanishad in Book 3, Chapter 1, similarly states,

सत्येन लभ्यस्तपसा ह्येष आत्मा सम्यग्ज्ञानेन ब्रह्मचर्येण नित्यम् ।

Through continuous pursuit of satya (truthfulness), tapas (perseverance, austerity), samyagjñāna (correct knowledge), and brahmacarya, one attains Atman (the Self).

— Mundaka Upanishad, III.1.5

The Vedas and early Upanishadic texts of Hinduism in their discussion of brahmacharya, make no mention of the age of the student at the start of brahmacharya, nor any restraint on sexual activity. However, there is a clear general consensus in both specific and various Upanishads (such as the Shandilya Upanishad) as well as Hindu smritis (such as the Manusmriti) that the male "student", referred to as the "Brahmachari[n]" should abstain from the "release of semen." This rule may or may not apply to the guru. The verses 11.5.4.16 and 11.5.4.17 of the Satpatha Brahamana present two different viewpoints on the sexual activity, of the guru during the Brahmacharya ashrama, i.e., the teacher of the "student Brahmachari[n]", one against and one as a choice. Similarly, in verse 11.5.4.18, the Satapatha Brahmana presents contrasting viewpoints on an eating restraint (regarding honey) for the brahmacārī student.

=== As a virtue ===
Brahmacharya is traditionally regarded as one of the five yamas in Yoga, as declared in verse 2.30 of Patanjali's Yoga Sutras. It is a form of self-restraint regarded as a virtue, and an observance recommended in a manner that depends on an individual's context. For a married practitioner, it means marital fidelity (not cheating on one's spouse); for a single person, it means celibacy. Patanjali in verse 2.38 states that the virtue of brahmacharya leads to the profit of virya (वीर्य). This Sanskrit word, virya, has been variously translated as virility and, by Vyasa, as strength and capacity. Vyasa explains that this virtue promotes other good qualities.

The Shandilya Upanishad includes brahmacharya as one of ten yamas in Chapter 1, defining it as "refraining from sexual intercourse in all places and in all states in mind, speech, or body" while Linga Purana in chapter 1.8 states that in case of householders, indulgence in sexual intercourse with their own wives and abstention from it with other women mentally, physically and verbally should be understood as brahmacharya as well.

Other ancient and medieval era texts of Hinduism describe the fruits of this virtue differently. For example, Pada Chandrika, Raja Marttanda, Sutrartha Bodhini, Mani Prabha, and Yoga Sudhakara each state that brahmacharya must be understood as the voluntary restraint of power. Chandogya Upanishad in verses of chapter 8.5 extols brahmacharya as a sacrament and sacrifice which, once perfected, leads to realization of the Self (Atman), and thereafter becomes the habit of experiencing the Self in others and everything. Tattva Vaisharadi and Yoga Sarasangraha assert that brahmacharya leads to an increase in jñana-shakti (power of knowledge) and kriya-shakti (power of action).

The great epic Mahabharata describes the objective of brahmacharya as knowledge of Brahman (Book Five, Udyoga Parva, the Book of Effort). Brahmacharya leads one to union with the Supreme Self (Chapter 43). By subduing desire, the practice of self-restraint enables the student to learn, pay attention in thought, word, and deed to the guru (teacher), and discover the truth embodied in the Vedas and Upanishads. According to the epic, the practice of studying and learning requires the "aid of time," as well as personal effort, ability, discussion, and practice, all of which are helped by virtue of brahmacharya. A brahmachāri should do useful work, and the earnings he obtains should be given away as dakshina ("fee," "gift of thanks") to the guru. The epic declares that brahmacharya is one of twelve virtues, an essential part of angas in yoga and the path of perfecting perseverance and the pursuit of knowledge.

== In Jainism ==
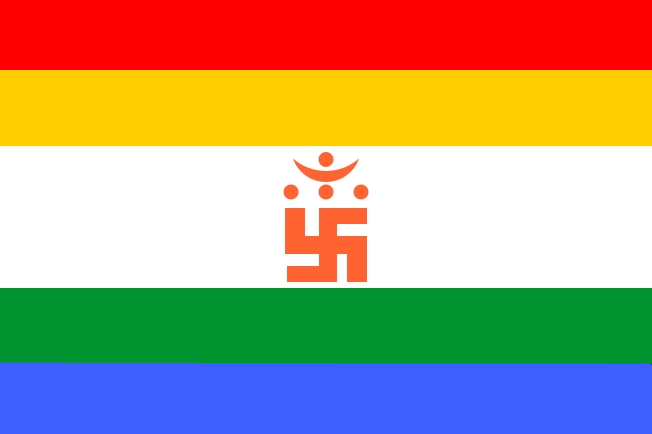
Green colour in the Jain flag stands for brahmacharya

Brahmacharya is one of the five vows prescribed for the śrāvakā (layman) and for ascetics in Jainism. For those Jains who adopt the path of monks, celibacy in action, words, and thoughts is expected. For lay Jains who are married, the virtue of brahmacharya requires remaining sexually faithful to one's chosen partner. For lay Jains who are unmarried, chaste living requires Jains to avoid sex before marriage. Uttam brahmacharya (Supreme Celibacy) is one of the ten excellencies of a Jain monk. Brahmacharya is mentioned as one of the das dharma (ten virtues) in ancient Jain texts like Tattvartha Sutra, Sarvārthasiddhi and Puruşārthasiddhyupāya.

== Among Sramanic traditions ==
Among the Sramanic traditions (Buddhism, Jainism, Ājīvika, and Charvaka schools), brahmacharya is the term used for a self-imposed practice of celibacy that is generally considered a prerequisite for spiritual practice. The fourth of the five great vows of Jain monks, for example, is the vow of celibacy, which in this case means total abstinence from the sensual pleasure of all five senses, including the avoidance of sexual thoughts and desires. The yogin who is firmly grounded in the virtue of brahmacharya is said to gain great vitality.

== As Ashrama stage of life ==
Brahmacharya in Hinduism literally means "conduct consistent with Brahman" or "on the path of Brahman".

Historically brahmacharya referred to a stage of life (ashrama) within the Vedic ashram system. Ancient Hindu culture divided the human lifespan into four stages: brahmacharya, grihastha, vanaprastha, and sannyasa. Brahamacharya ashrama occupies the first 20–25 years of life, roughly corresponding to adolescence. Upon the child's upanayanam, the young person would begin a life of study in the Gurukula (the household of the Guru) dedicated to learning all aspects of dharma that is the "principles of righteous living". Dharma comprised personal responsibilities towards himself, family, society, humanity, and God which included the environment, earth, and nature. This educational period started when the child was five to eight years old and lasted until the age of 14 to 20 years. During this stage of life, the traditional vedic sciences and various sastras are studied along with the religious texts contained within the Vedas and Upanishads. This stage of life was characterized by the practice of celibacy. The purpose of brahmacharya in this stage is to get rid of passions, which interfere with learning.

During this stage of life, the chastity is for the purposes of learning from a guru (teacher), and during later stages of life, it is for the purposes of attaining spiritual liberation. (Sanskrit: moksha).

Brahmacharya for girls

The Vedas and Upanishads do not restrict the student stage of life to males. Atharva Veda, for example, states

ब्रह्मचर्येण कन्या युवानं विन्दते पतिम्

A youthful Kanya (कन्या, girl) who graduates from brahmacarya, obtains a suitable husband.

— Atharva Veda, 11.5.18

No age restrictions

Gonda states that there were no age restrictions for the start of brahmacharya in ancient India. Not only young men, but older people resorted to the student stage of life, and sought teachers who were authoritative in certain subjects. The Chandogya Upanishad, in Section 5.11, describes "wealthy and learned householders" becoming brahmacārīs (students) with Rishi Kaikeya, to gain knowledge about Atman (inner Self) and Brahman (Ultimate Reality).

== See also ==
- Asceticism – Lifestyle of frugality and abstinence
- Atma Shatkam – Nondual Hindu text
- Fi sabilillah – Arabic expression meaning "in the cause of Allah"
- Kiddush Hashem – Sanctification of the Name, precept of Judaism
- Monk – Member of a monastic religious order
- Yamas – Ethical rules in Hinduism and Yoga
- Yoga Sutras of Patanjali – Early Yoga text in Sanskrit from ancient India by Patanjali

== Sources ==
- Jain, Champat Rai (1926), Sannyasa Dharma, " This article incorporates text from this source, which is in the public domain."
- Jain, Vijay K. (2012), Acharya Amritchandra's Purushartha Siddhyupaya: Realization of the Pure Self, With Hindi and English Translation, Vikalp Printers, ISBN 978-81-903639-4-5, " This article incorporates text from this source, which is in the public domain."
- Sangave, Vilas Adinath (1980), Jain Community: A Social Survey (2nd ed.), Bombay: Popular Prakashan, ISBN 978-0-317-12346-3
