= Ratnakaranda śrāvakācāra =

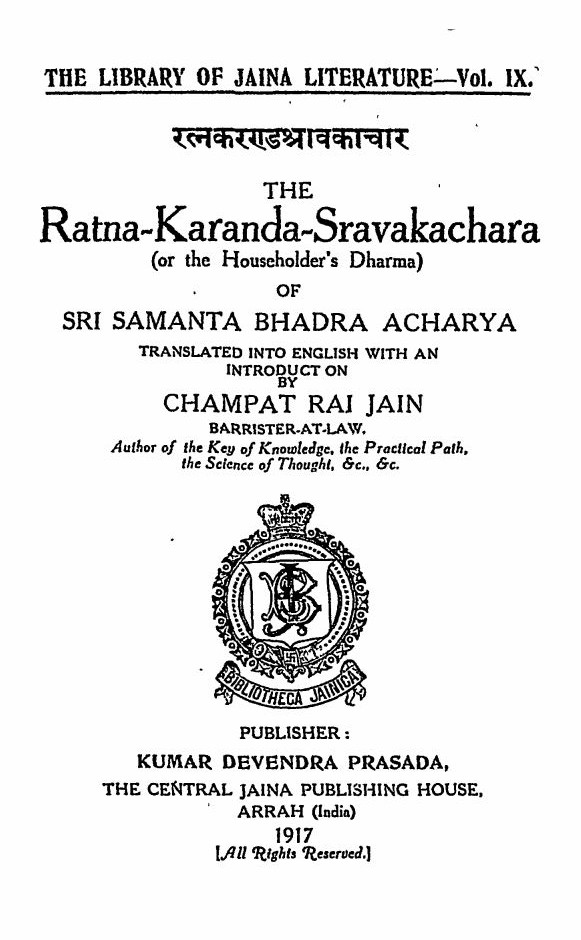
- English translation of the Ratnakaranda śrāvakācāra (1917) by Champat Rai Jain

Information
- Religion: Jainism
- Author: Aacharya Samantbhadra Swamy
- Language: Sanskrit
- Period: 2nd Century CE

Ratnakaranda śrāvakācāra is a Jain text composed by Aacharya Samantbhadra Swamy (second century CE), an acharya of the Digambara sect of Jainism. Aacharya Samantbhadra Swamy was originally from Kanchipuram, Tamil Nadu. Ratnakaranda śrāvakācāra is the earliest and one of the best-known śrāvakācāra.

A śrāvakācāra discusses the conduct of a Śrāvaka or Jain lay practitioner. Hiralal Shastri mentions 29 such texts from 2nd century CE to modern times.

== Overview ==
First verse of the Ratnakaranda śrāvakācāra is dedicated to Vardhamāna Mahāvīra, the 24th Tirthankara:

Namāh śri Vardhamāna-e nirdhutakalilātmane
Sālokānāma trilokānāma yadā-vidyā darpanāyate! (1-1)

Tr.- I bow to Śri Vardhamāna Mahāvīra who has washed off [all] the impurities of karmic filth from His Soul, [and] In Whose Perception scintillate the three Worlds and the infinity of Space, as in a mirror !

== Chapters ==
Seven chapters or parts of the Ratnakaranda śrāvakācāra are:

1. Right Faith
2. Characteristics of Right Knowledge
3. Anuvrata
4. Guņa vratas
5. Śikşā vratas
6. Sallekhanā
7. Eleven Pratimas

== Translation ==
Ratnakaranda śrāvakācāra was first translated in English language in 1917 by Champat Rai Jain. It was named "The Householder's Dharma" which means the conduct of a householder.
