= Aryika =

Female mendicant in Jainism

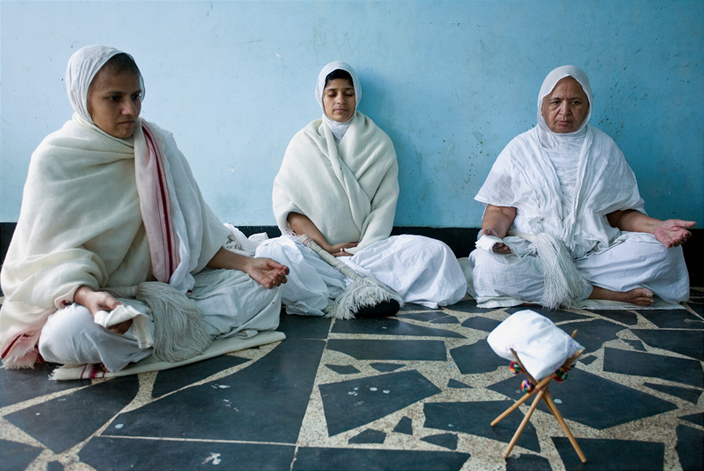
Śvetāmbara sadhvis meditating near Vrindavan, India.

Aryika, also known as Sadhvi, is a female mendicant (nun) in Jainism.

== History ==
In the traditional Digambara tradition, a male human being is considered closest to the apex with the potential to achieve liberation, particularly through asceticism. Women must gain karmic merit, to be reborn as man, and only then can they achieve spiritual liberation in the Digambara sect of Jainism. This view is different from the Svetambara sect that believes that women can also achieve liberation from Saṃsāra by being mendicants and through ascetic practices.

According to Svetambara Jain texts, from Kalpa Sūtra onwards, Jainism has had more sadhvis than sadhus (female than male mendicants). In Tapa Gacch of the modern era, the ratio of sadhvis to sadhus (nuns to monks) is about 3.5 to 1. This is much higher, and in contrast to the gender ratio historically observed in Buddhism and Hinduism..According to a 2009 publication by Harvey J. Sindima, Jain monastic community had 6,000 sadhvis of which less than 100 belong to the Digambara tradition and rest to Śvetāmbara.

Traditionally, in contrast to Svetambara, the Digambara sect has had far less sadhvis. In contemporary times, some Digambara organizations include sandhvis, but the ratio of sadhvis to sadhus (nuns to monks) has been about 1 to 3.

== Conduct ==
A Sadhvi, like a Sadhu, enters the mendicant order by making the Five vows: Ahimsa (Non-violence or Non-injury), Satya (Truthfulness), Asteya (Non-stealing), Brahmacharya (Abstinence from sex and sensual pleasures), and Aparigraha (Non-attachment).

Describing the conduct of aryikas, Champat Rai Jain in his book, Sannyāsa Dharma writes:

The aryika does not visit, the house of a layman alone or without purpose. She is allowed a single robe which is to cover her entire body, from head to foot. In all other respects she conducts herself as a saint of the opposite sex. The aryika is not qualified, as such, to aspire for the pandita-pandita death, but she expects to reach it, from a male body, in a subsequent incarnation. The reason for this is to be found in the fact that a female body is not like a male body in all respects, so that salvation is not possible for a female from the female form. Short of this, however, there is no other difference between the two, the male saint and the aryika (nun), and the latter obtains heaven as the result of her asceticism, when, destroying the liability to be reborn in the female form, she appears in the heavenly regions in the male body of a deva (a resident of the heavenly regions). In her subsequent re-birth amongst men she will retain the male sex, and will then be qualified for salvation through the pandita-pandita mode of passage from 'death to Life Eternal in Nirvana. The aryika sits down to take her food, but in other respects follows the rules by which saints of the opposite sex are governed.

Jains supporting the spiritual liberation of womankind note that their conduct is inclusive in such a path: "It is by way of the Three Jewels that one attains moksa. Nowhere in the Agamas is it stated that women are unable to realise these Three Jewels" (the right faith, right knowledge, and right conduct).

== See also ==
- Jain monasticism
- Jain schools and branches
