= Jain monasticism =

Order of monks and nuns in the Jain community

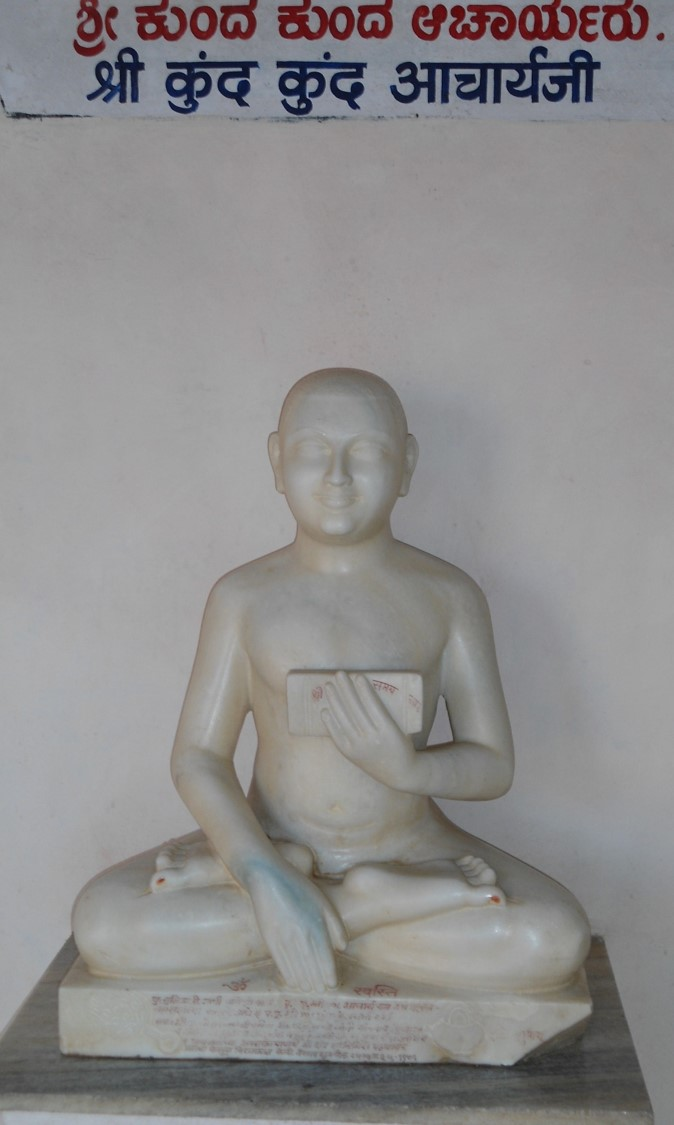
Kundakunda, one of the most revered Digambara monks

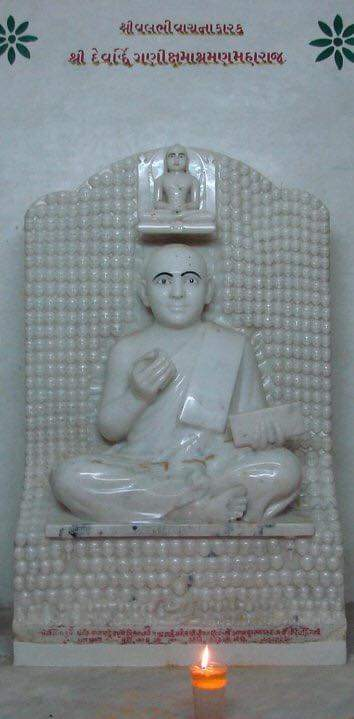
An idol of Devardhi Ksamashramana, one of the most revered Śvetāmbara acharyas, at Vallabhi Tirth.

Jain monasticism refers to the order of monks and nuns in the Jain community and can be divided into two major denominations: the Digambara and the Śvētāmbara. The monastic practices of the two major denominations vary greatly, but the major principles of both are identical. Five mahāvratas (Great Vows), from Mahavira's teachings, are followed by all Jain ascetics of both the sects. Historians believe that a united Jain sangha (community) existed before 367 BCE, about 160 years after the moksha (liberation) of Mahavira. The community then gradually divided into the major denominations. However, no evidence indicate when the schism between the Digambaras and the Śvetāmbaras happened.

== Terminology ==
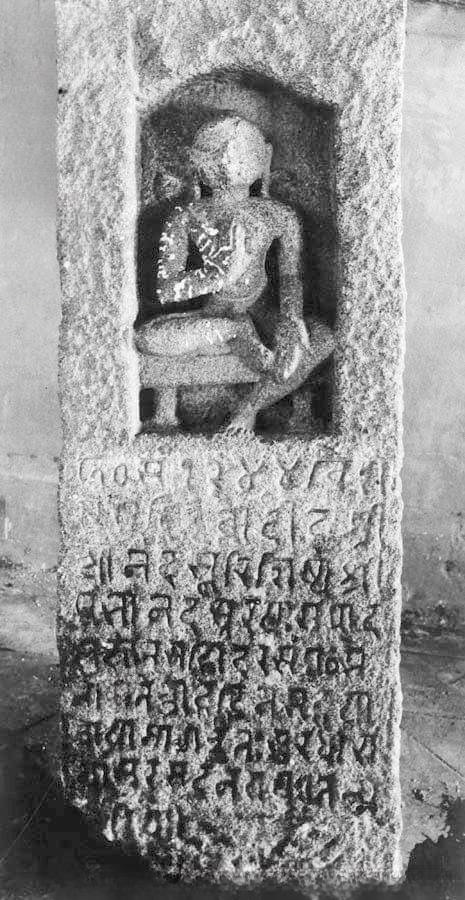
A carving of Svetambara Jain monk, and inscription from 1188 CE at Girnar.

Digambaras use the word muṇi for male monastics and aryika for female monastics. Svetambara monks are also called nirgrantha (without bonds). Śvētāmbaras also use the word muṇi for male monastics but use the term sadhvis for female monastics.

== History ==
Mahavira had 11 chief disciples, Indrabhuti Gautama being the most senior. Each chief disciple was made responsible for 2500 to 5000 monks. The Jain sangha (community) was led and administered by an organised system consisting of acharyas (leaders), upadhyayas (teachers), sthaviras (motivators of self-discipline), pravartakas (preachers) and ganis (leader of smaller groups of monks). Other titles included panyasa (canonical text experts), mahattara (female leader) and pravartini (female preacher).

The leadership of Jain order passed from Mahavira to Indrabhuti, who was succeeded by Sudharma (607–506 BCE). After 12 years, it was further passed on to Jambu (543–449 BCE), Prabhava (443–338 BCE) and Shayyambhava (377–315 BCE).

Historians believe that a united Jain community existed before 367 BCE, about 160 years after the moksha (liberation) of Mahavira. The community then gradually divided into two denominations: the Digambara and the Śvētāmbara. The Kalpa Sūtra describes Mahavira's asceticism in detail; from it and from the Ācārāṅga Sūtra, most of the Śvetāmbara ascetic practices (including the restraints and regulations) are derived:

The Venerable Ascetic Mahavira for a year and a month wore clothes; after that time he walked about naked, and accepted the alms in the hollow of his hand. For more than twelve years the Venerable Ascetic Mahavira neglected his body and abandoned the care of it; he with equanimity bore, underwent, and suffered all pleasant or unpleasant occurrences arising from divine powers, men, or animals.

— Kalpa Sūtra 117

Henceforth the Venerable Ascetic Mahavira was houseless, circumspect in his walking, circumspect in his speaking, circumspect in his begging, circumspect in his accepting (anything), in the carrying of his outfit and drinking vessel; circumspect in evacuating excrement, urine, saliva, mucus, and uncleanliness of the body; circumspect in his thoughts, circumspect in his words, circumspect in his acts; guarding his thoughts, guarding his words, guarding his acts, guarding his senses, guarding his chastity; without wrath, without pride, without deceit, without greed; calm, tranquil, composed, liberated, free from temptations, without egoism, without property; he had cut off all earthly ties, and was not stained by any worldliness: as water does not adhere to a copper vessel, or collyrium to mother of pearl (so sins found no place in him); his course was unobstructed like that of Life; like the firmament he wanted no support; like the wind he knew no obstacles; his heart was pure like the water (of rivers or tanks) in autumn; nothing could soil him like the leaf of a lotus; his senses were well protected like those of a tortoise; he was single and alone like the horn of a rhinoceros; he was free like a bird; he was always waking like the fabulous bird Bharundal, valorous like an elephant, strong like a bull, difficult to attack like a lion, steady and firm like Mount Mandara, deep like the ocean, mild like the moon, refulgent like the sun, pure like excellent gold'; like the earth he patiently bore everything; like a well-kindled fire he shone in his splendour.

— Kalpa Sūtra 118

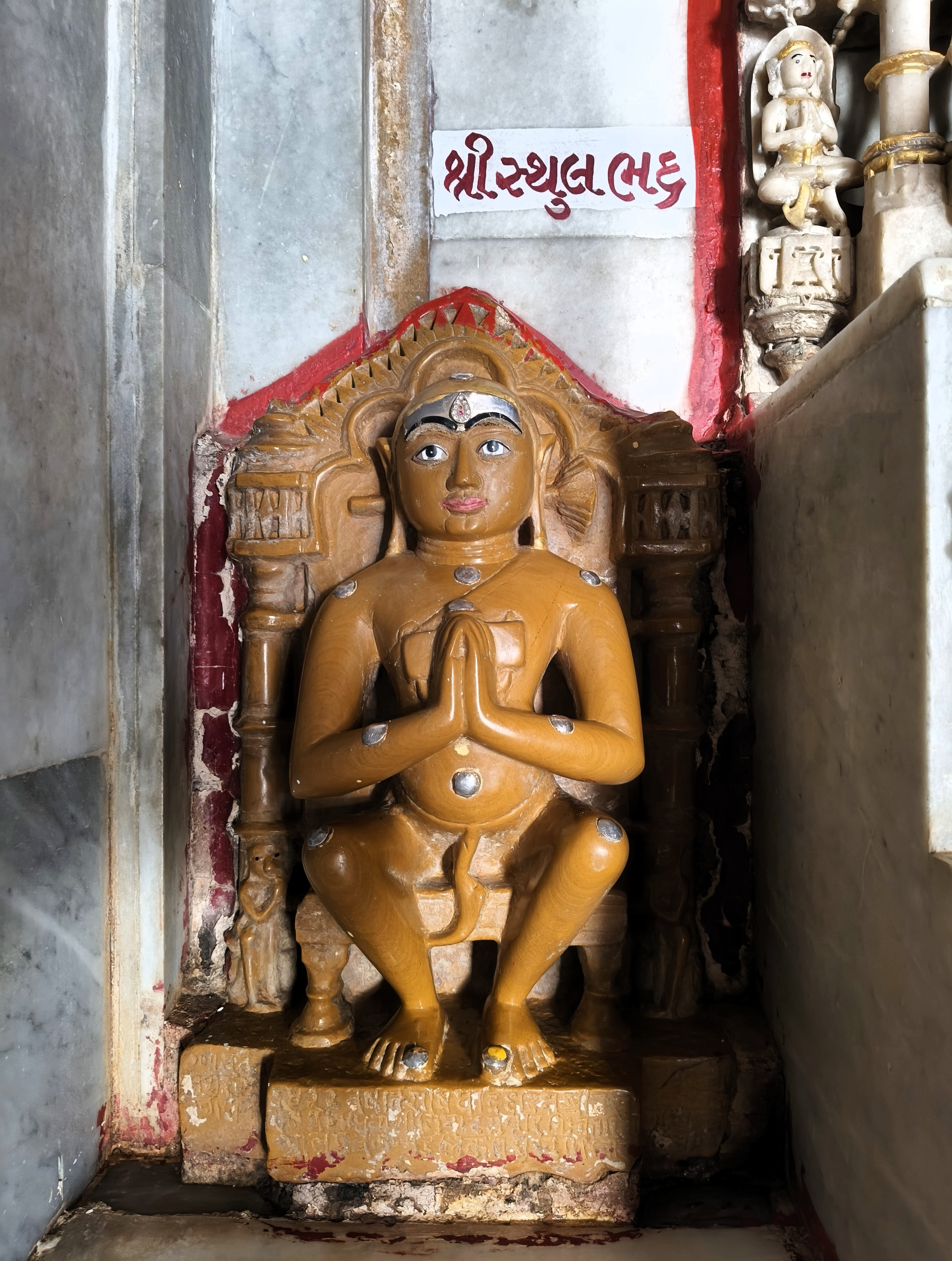
14th century Ārya Sthūlabhadra idol at the Khaḍākhoṭadī no Pāḍo Jaina Temple at Patan

== Initiation ==
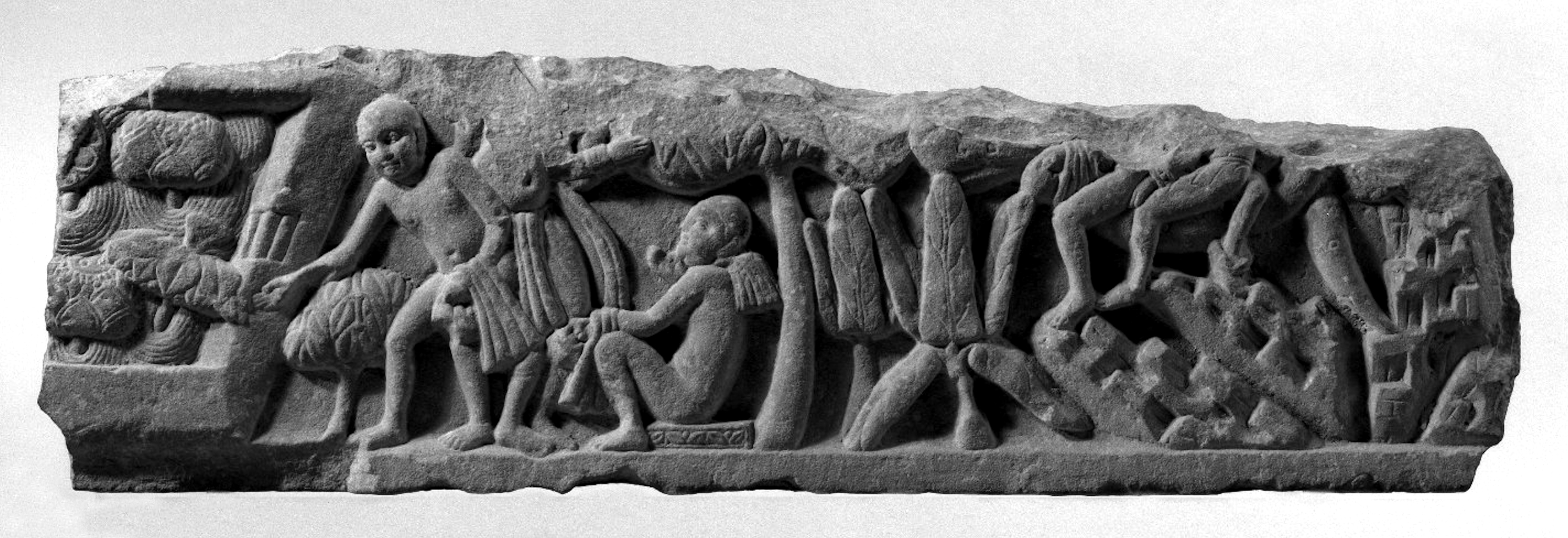
A 1st- to 2nd–century CE water tank relief panel showing two ardhaphalaka Jain monks carrying colapatta cloth on their left hand found in the ruins of Mathura (Brooklyn Museum 87.188.5). This cloth carrying tradition to cover genitalia by ancient Jain monks in principle resembles the beliefs of the Śvetāmbara

A Śvētāmbara initiation involves a procession in which the initiate symbolically disposes of his material wealth and makes donations. This is followed by another ritual in which the initiate receives a small broom made of wool called "Rajoharan" from their mentor as a symbol of welcome into the monastic order. The initiate then puts on monastic clothing and plucks out hair by hand. Further rituals formally initiate them into the monastic order. The Śvētāmbara Terapanth and Sthanakwasi sects request written permission from a person's parents before initiating them into the ascetic order.

== Rules of conduct ==
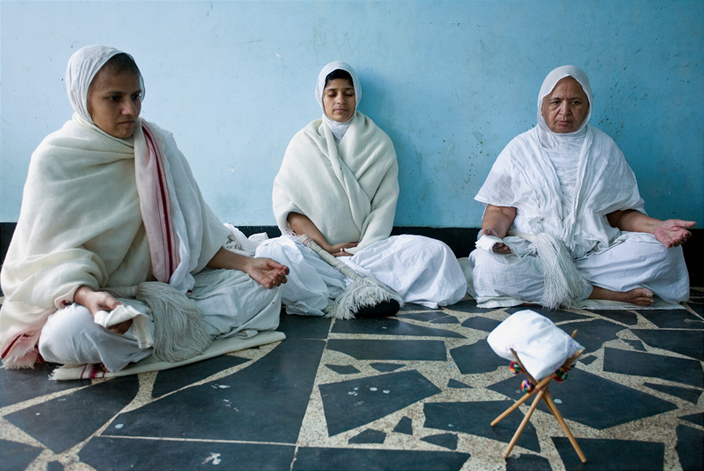
Jain nuns meditating

The earliest known texts often ask for ascetics to be in complete solitude, identifying the isolation of soul and non-soul. However, soon after Mahavira's nirvana ascetics organized themselves into groups. A few examples of ascetics living in complete solitude are found in both Digambara and Śvetāmbara sects. Jain ascetics are detached from social and worldly activities; all activities are aimed at self-purification for self-realization as well as to spread the word of Jainism. They follow established guidelines for daily worship and austerity.

The monk's daily routine is broadly structured by three ideological formulae: the five great vows (mahavrata), the eight matrices of doctrine (pravacana-matrka), and the six obligatory actions (avasyaka). The first two are restrictions, and the third is positively framed in what the monk is encouraged to do daily. Ascetics do not have a home or possessions. They choose austerity, avoid services such as telephones and electricity. Monks engage in activities such as meditation, seeking knowledge and acquiring self-discipline. Jain monks and advanced laypeople avoid eating after sunset, observing a vow of ratri-bhojana-tyaga-vrata. Digambara monks eat only once a day and do not use utensils.

The Yati of the Śvētāmbara sect and the Bhattaraka of the Digambara Terapanth do not wander; they usually live in temples and perform daily rituals. The monks rise before dawn, most around 5:00 a.m. but some as early as 2:00 a.m.

Five mahāvratas (Great Vows), from Mahavira's teachings, are followed by all Jain ascetics. Although Jain householders are also required to observe them, ascetics are bound more strictly.

== Ranks ==
Monks and nuns from the Digambara traditions are assigned to ranks:

Rank	Monk	Nun
1	Acharya	Ganini Aryika Pramukha
2	Elachary	Ganini Aryika
3	Upadhyay	Aryika
4	Muni	Mataji
5	Kshullak	Kshullika
6	Brahmachari	Brahmacharini
7	Śrāvaka	Śrāvika

In the Digambara tradition, an ascetic rises from kshullak (one who uses two pieces of cloth) through Ailak (uses one piece of cloth) to muni (or sadhu). Over time a number of designations were mentioned in shastras, such as gani, pannyas and pravartak. The Śvētāmbara Terapanth sect has a new rank of junior monks, samana.

Monks of the Śvetāmbara Murtipujaka sect rise from muni to upaadhyaay, and later to acharya based on their knowledge of the scriptures and seniority. This is in accordance with the Namokar Mantra.

== Attire and possessions ==
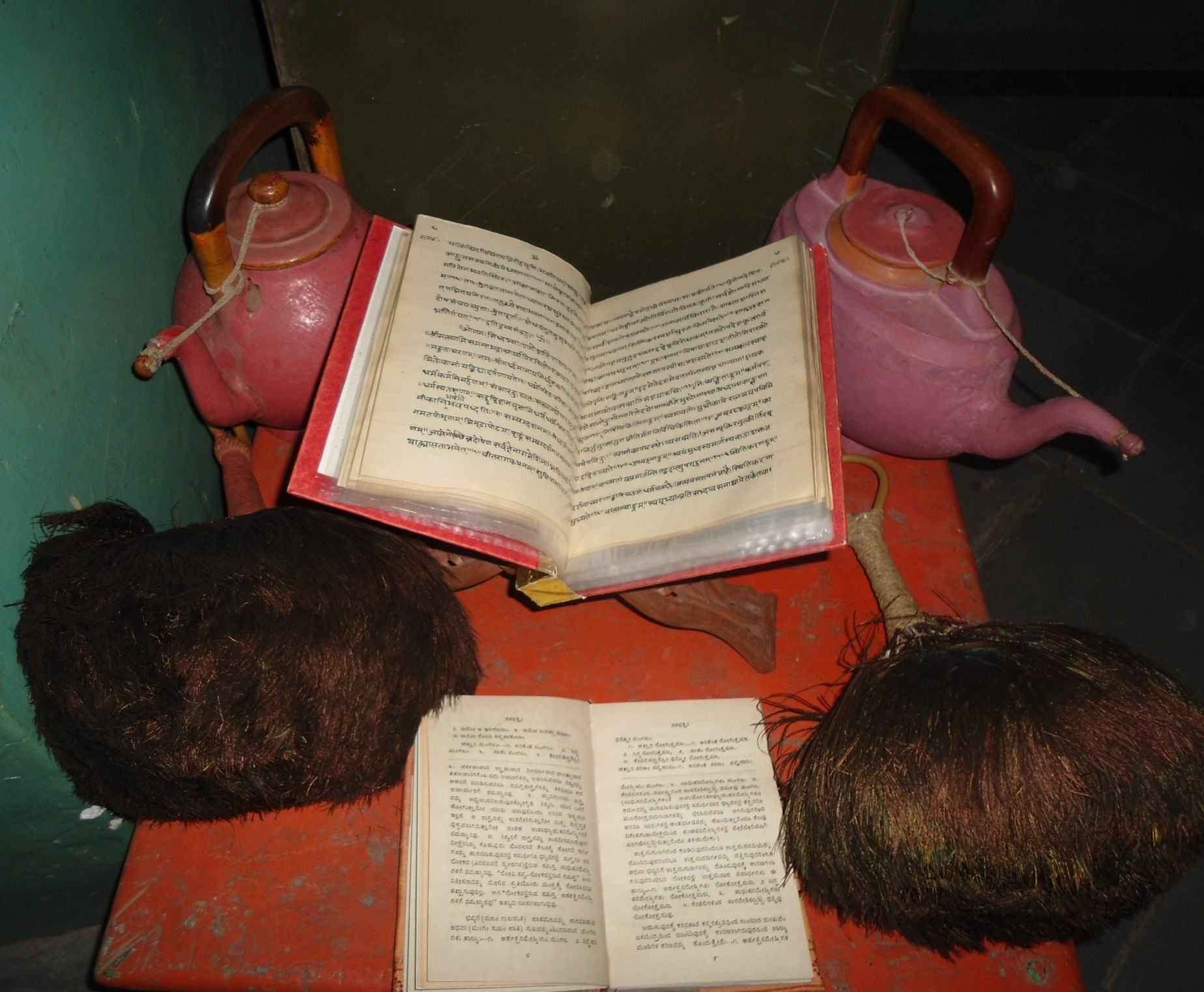
The three instruments of ahimsa: pichi, kamandalu and shastras

Digambara monks wear no clothing. Digambara nuns (or Aryikas) wear plain, seamless white saris. All Digambara monks and nuns traditionally carry only three things: a mor-pichhi (peacock-feather whisk), a kamandalu (water pot) and shastras (scriptures).

Śvētāmbara monastics wear white, seamless clothing. They also carry scriptures with them. Additionally, they have a rajoharan (woollen broom), dandasan (long stick), and alms bowl to beg for food.

== Chaturmas ==
Chaturmas is the four-month monsoon period during which ascetics stay in one place to reduce the risk of accidentally killing insects and other small forms of life which thrive during the rains. This period is suitable for sravakas to renew their faith by listening to teachings of the dharma, meditation and vratas (acts of self-control).

During Chaturmas, a few sadhus of each group give a daily pravacana or vyakhyana (sermon) attended mostly by shravakas and shravikas (lay followers of Jainism). During their eight months of travel, the sadhus give sermons whenever requested (most often when they arrive in a new village or town during traveling).

The festival of Paryushana, celebrated by Śvetāmbaras falls during the Chaturmaas. The Śvetāmbara Murtipujak monks read and recite the holy text Kalpa Sūtra during Paryushana. The Kalpa Sūtra also prescribes the conduct monks must follow during the Chaturmaas.

== Digambara monks ==
Digambara monks follow 28 vratas (vows): five mahāvratas (Great Vows); five samitis (regulations); the five-fold control of the senses (pañcendriya nirodha); six Şadāvaśyakas (essential duties), and seven niyamas (restrictions).

Category	Vow	Meaning
Mahavratas (Great Vows)	1. Ahimsa	To injure no living being by action or thought
Mahavratas (Great Vows)	2. Truth	To speak only the truth and good words
Mahavratas (Great Vows)	3. Asteya	To take nothing unless it is given
Mahavratas (Great Vows)	4. Brahmacharya	Celibacy in action, word and thought
Mahavratas (Great Vows)	5. Aparigraha	Renunciation of worldly things
Samiti (regulation of activities)	6. Irya	To walk carefully, after viewing the land four cubits (2 yards) ahead
Samiti (regulation of activities)	7. Bhasha	Not to criticise anyone or speak evil words
Samiti (regulation of activities)	8. Eshna	To accept food from a sravaka (householder) if it is free of 46 faults
Samiti (regulation of activities)	9. Adan-nishep	Carefulness in handling whatever the ascetic possesses
Samiti (regulation of activities)	10. Pratishṭapan	To dispose of body waste at a place free of living beings
Panchindrinirodh	11–15. Control of the senses	Shedding attachment and aversion to objects based sparśana (touch), rasana (taste), ghrāṇa (smell), cakśu (sight), and śrotra (hearing)
Essential duties	16. Sāmāyika	Meditate for equanimity towards every living being
Essential duties	17. Stuti	Worship of the tirthankaras
Essential duties	18. Vandan	To pay obeisances to siddhas, arihantas and acharyas
Essential duties	19. Pratikramana	Repentance, to drive oneself away from past karma (good or evil)
Essential duties	20. Pratikhayan	Renunciation
Essential duties	21. Kayotsarga	Giving up attachment to the body, meditating on the soul
Niyama (rules)	22. Adantdhavan	Not to use tooth powder to clean teeth
Niyama (rules)	23. Bhushayan	Sleep on hard ground
Niyama (rules)	24. Asnāna	Not to take bath.
Niyama (rules)	25. Stithi-bhojan	Eat standing up
Niyama (rules)	26. Ekabhukti	To take food once in a day
Niyama (rules)	27. Keśa-lonch	To pluck hair on the head and face by hand
Niyama (rules)	28. Nudity	To renounce clothing

== See also ==
- List of Jain ascetics
- Jain schools and branches
- Ācārāṅga Sūtra
- Kalpa Sūtra
