= Ashtamangala =

Eight auspicious signs in Hinduism, Jainism, and Buddhism

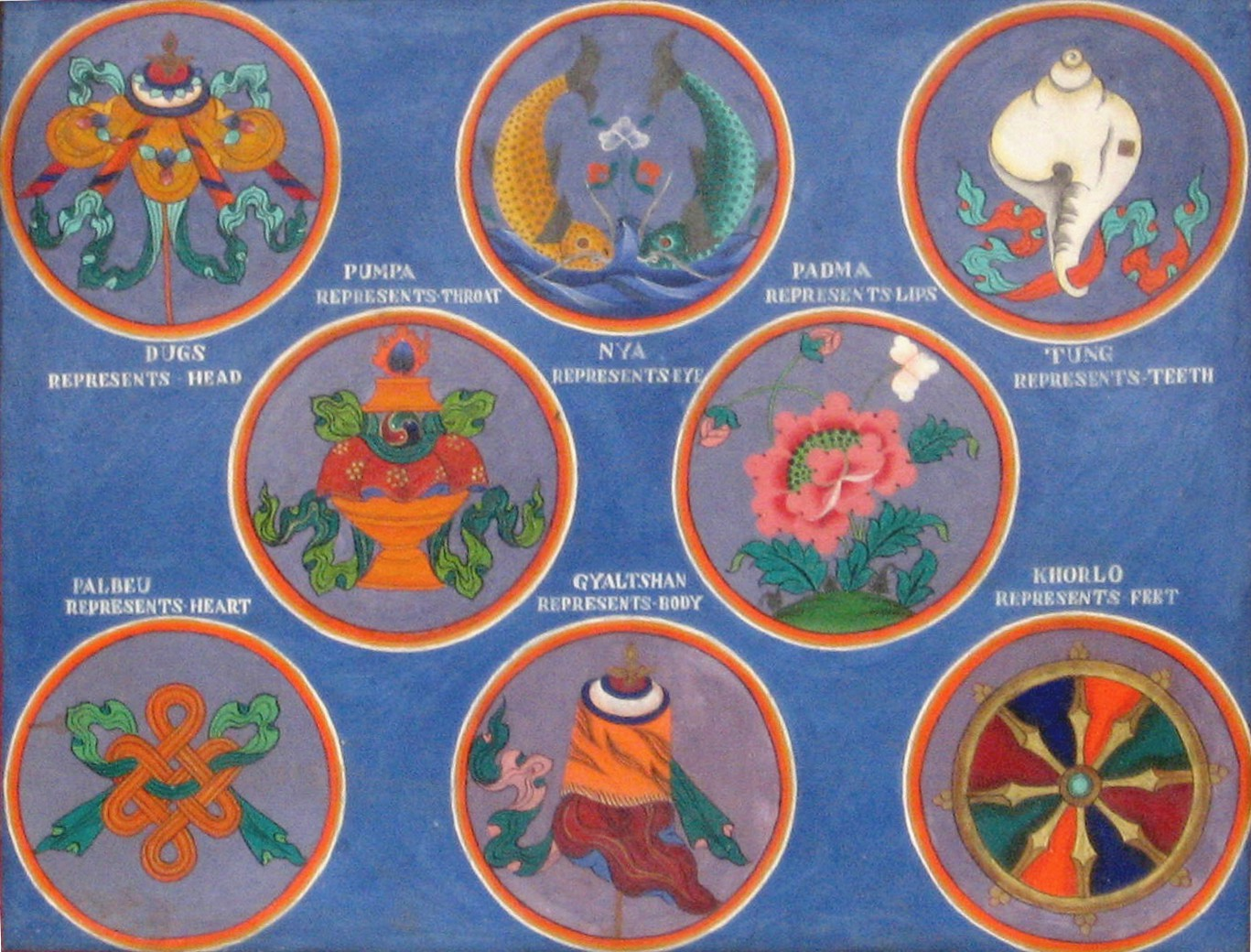
Ashtamangala: first row (left to right): parasol, pair of golden fish, conch; second row: treasure vase, lotus; Last row: infinite knot, victory banner and wheel.

The Ashtamangala (Sanskrit: अष्टमङ्गल, romanized: Aṣṭamaṅgala) is the sacred set of Eight Auspicious Signs (Chinese: 八吉祥, bājíxiáng) featured in a number of Indian religions such as Hinduism, Jainism, and Buddhism. The symbols or "symbolic attributes" (Tibetan: ཕྱག་མཚན་, THL: chaktsen) are yidam and teaching tools. Not only do these attributes (or energetic signatures) point to qualities of enlightened mindstream, but they are the investiture that ornaments these enlightened "qualities" (Sanskrit: guṇa; Tibetan: ཡོན་ཏན་, THL: yönten). Many cultural enumerations and variations of the Ashtamangala are extant.

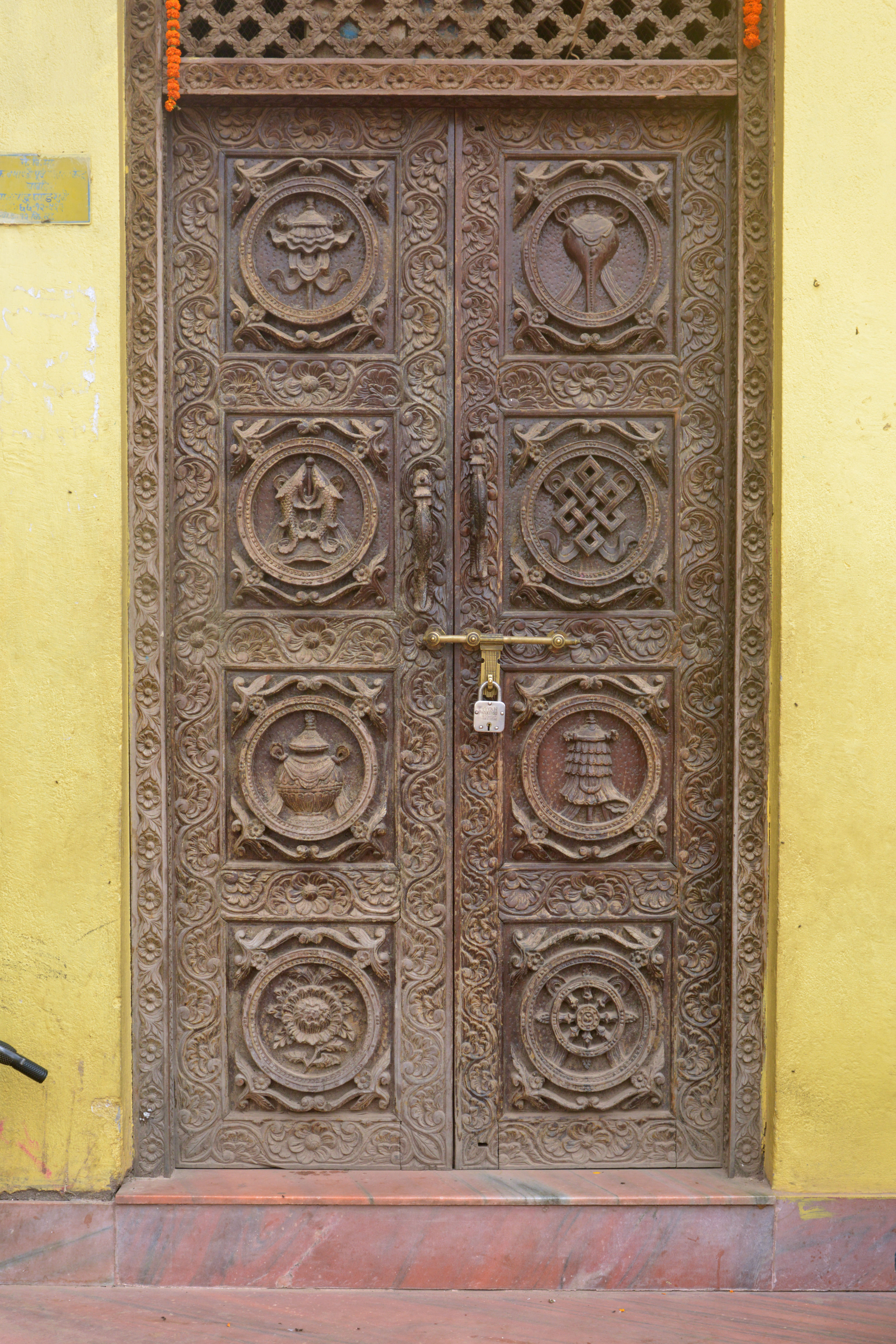
Carved wooden door with 8 auspicious signs (Ashtamangala) in Nepal

== Buddhism ==
Groupings of eight auspicious symbols were originally used in India at ceremonies such as an investiture or coronation of a king. An early grouping of symbols included: throne, swastika, handprint, hooked knot, vase of jewels, water libation flask, pair of fishes, lidded bowl. In Buddhism, these eight symbols of good fortune represent the offerings made by the gods to Shakyamuni Buddha immediately after he gained enlightenment.

Tibetan Buddhists make use of a particular set of eight auspicious symbols, ashtamangala, in household and public art. Some common interpretations are given along with each symbol although different teachers may give different interpretations:

=== Conch ===
Śaṅkha

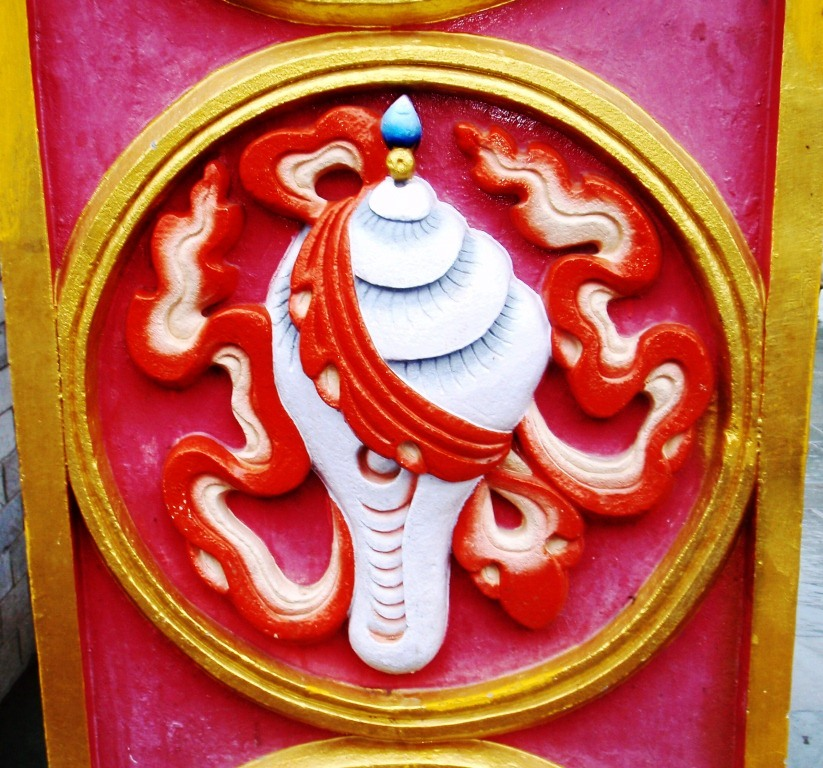
Auspicious symbol – conch Rewalsar

The right-turning white conch shell (Sanskrit: śaṅkha; Tibetan: དུང་དཀར་གཡས་འཁྱིལ་, THL: dungkar yénkhyil) represents the beautiful, deep, melodious, interpenetrating and pervasive sound of the dharma, which awakens disciples from the deep slumber of ignorance and urges them to accomplish their own welfare for the welfare of others.

The conch shell is thought to have been the original horn-trumpet; ancient Indian mythical epics relate heroes carrying conch shells. The Indian god Vishnu is also described as having a conch shell as one of his main emblems; his shell bore the name Panchajanya meaning "having control over the five classes of beings".

=== Endless knot ===
Endless knot

The endless knot (Sanskrit: श्रीवत्स; Tibetan: དཔལ་བེའུ་, THL: pelbeu) denotes "the auspicious mark represented by a curled noose emblematic of love". It is a symbol of the ultimate unity of everything. Moreover, it represents the intertwining of wisdom and compassion, the mutual dependence of religious doctrine and secular affairs, the union of wisdom and method, the inseparability of śūnyatā "emptiness" and pratītyasamutpāda "interdependent origination", and the union of wisdom and compassion in enlightenment (see: namkha). This knot, net or web metaphor also conveys the Buddhist teaching of interpenetration.. It is also an attribute of the god Vishnu, which is said to be engraved on his chest. A similar engraving of the Shrivatsa on the historical Gautama Buddha's chest is mentioned in some lists of the Physical characteristics of the Buddha.

=== Pair of golden fish ===
Pair of golden fish

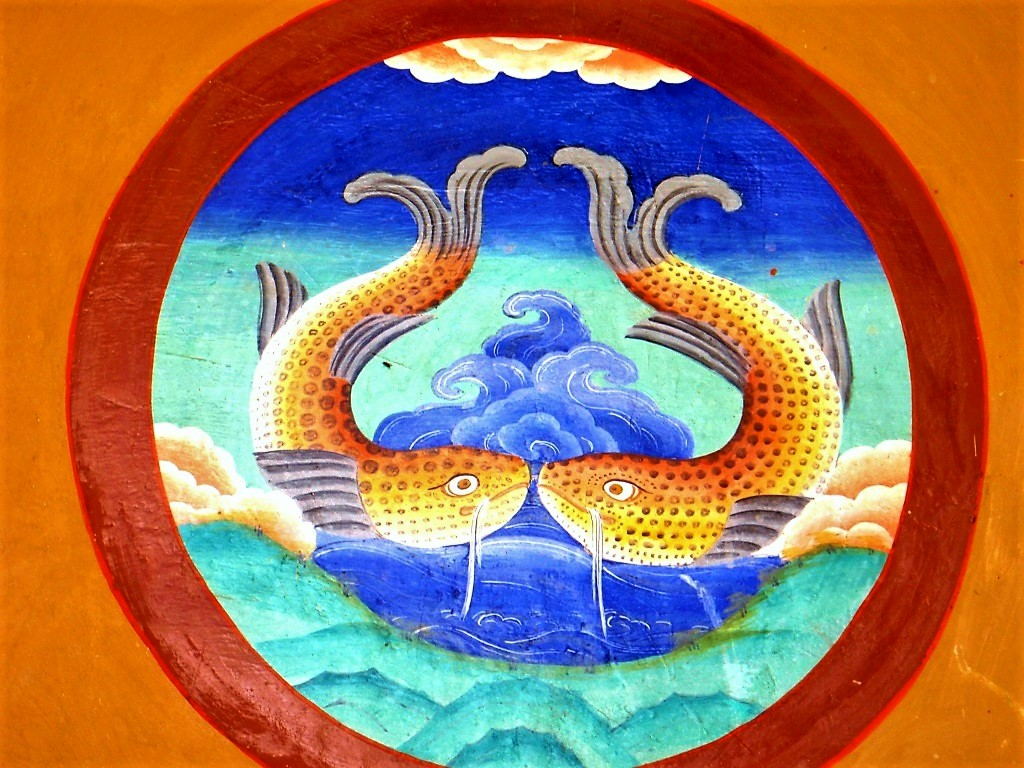
Auspicious symbol. Two Golden Fish. Likir Monastery, Ladakh

The two golden fish (Sanskrit: gaurmatsya; Tibetan: གསེར་ཉ་, THL: sernya) symbolise the auspiciousness of all sentient beings in a state of fearlessness without danger of drowning in saṃsāra. The two golden fishes are linked with the Ganges and Yamuna nadi, prana and carp:

The two fishes originally represented the two main sacred rivers of India – the Ganges and Yamuna. These rivers are associated with the lunar and solar channels, which originate in the nostrils and carry the alternating rhythms of breath or prana. They have religious significance in Hindu, Jain and Buddhist traditions but also in Christianity (the sign of the fish, the feeding of the five thousand). In Buddhism, the fish symbolize happiness as they have complete freedom of movement in the water. They represent fertility and abundance. Often drawn in the form of carp, which are regarded in the Orient as sacred on account of their elegant beauty, size, and life-span.

=== Lotus ===
The lotus flower, or padma

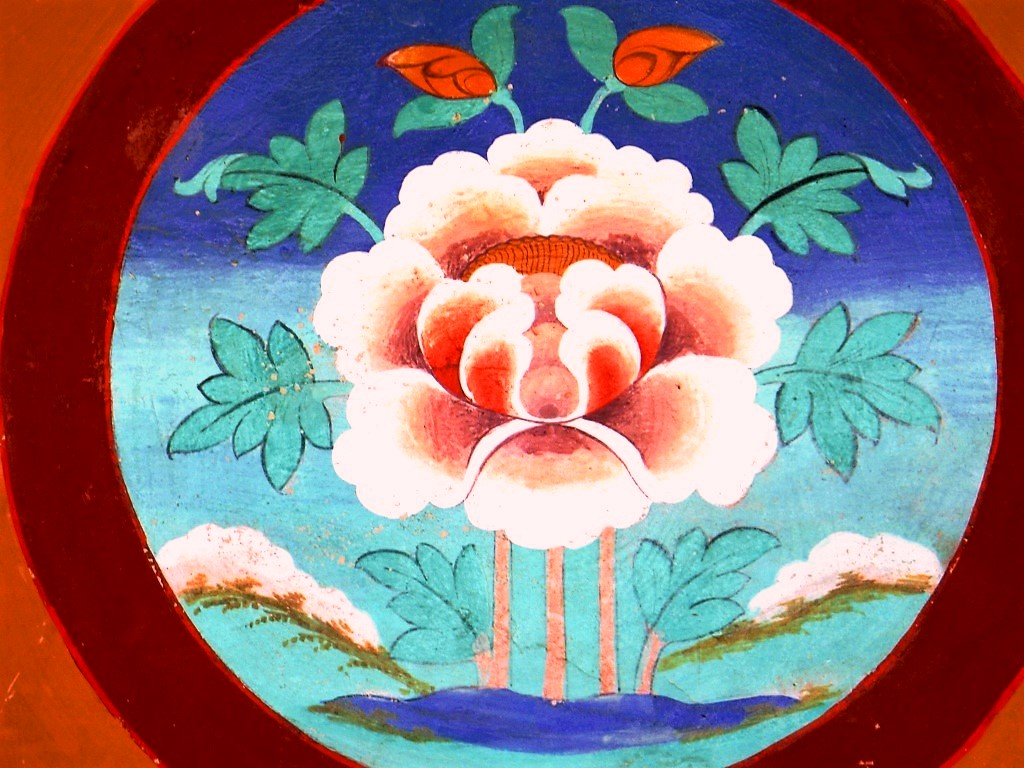
Auspicious symbol. Lotus – Padma. Likir Monastery.

The lotus flower (Sanskrit: padma; Tibetan: པདྨ, THL: péma) represents the primordial purity of body, speech, and mind, floating above the muddy waters of attachment and desire. The lotus symbolizes purity and renunciation. Although the lotus has its roots in the mud at the bottom of a pond, its flower lies immaculate above the water. The Buddhist lotus bloom has 4, 8, 16, 24, 32, 64, 100, or 1,000 petals. The same figures can refer to the body's 'internal lotuses', that is to say, its energy centres (chakra).

=== Parasol ===
Jewelled parasol

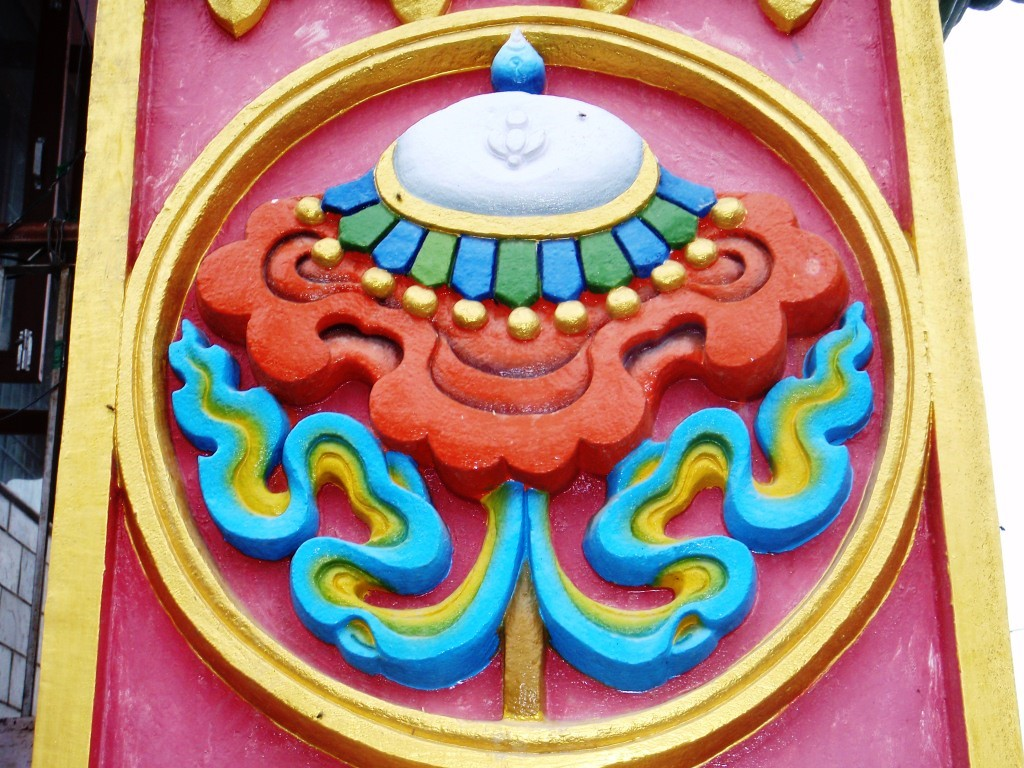
Auspicious symbol - Parasol. Rewalsar.

The jewelled parasol (Sanskrit: chatraratna; Tibetan: རིན་ཆེན་གདུགས་, THL: rinchenduk), which is similar in ritual function to the baldachin or canopy: represents the protection of beings from harmful forces and illness. It represents the canopy or firmament of the sky and therefore the expansiveness and unfolding of space and the element æther. It represents the expansiveness, unfolding and protective quality of the sahasrara: all take refuge in the dharma under the auspiciousness of the parasol.

=== Vase ===
Treasure vase

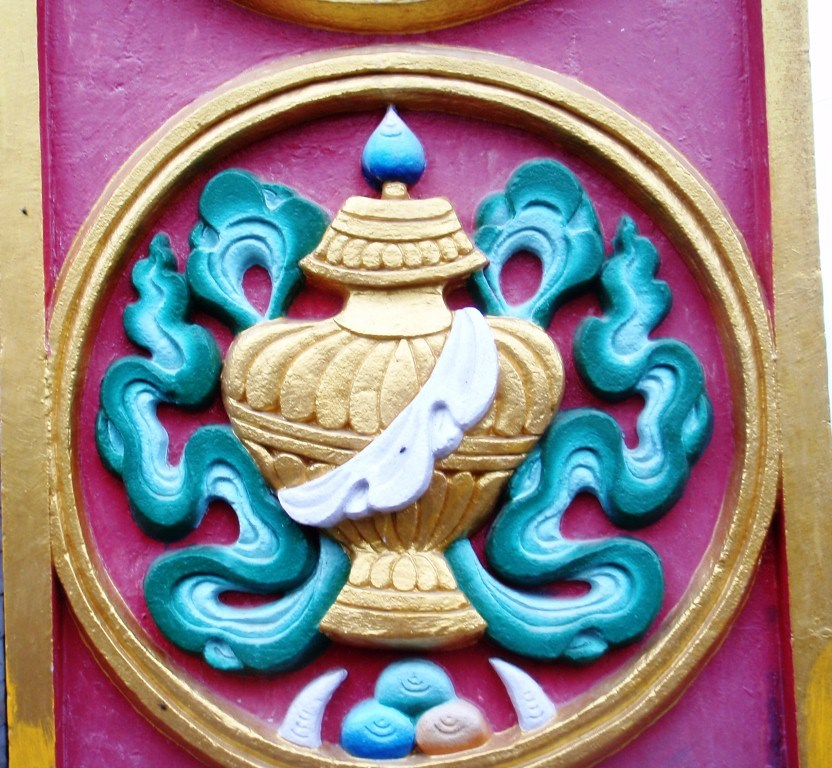
Auspicious symbol – Vase. Rewalsar.

The treasure vase (Tibetan: གཏེར་ཆེན་པོའི་བུམ་པ་, THL: terchenpo'i bumpa) represents health, longevity, wealth, prosperity, wisdom and the phenomenon of space. The treasure vase, or pot, symbolizes the Buddha's infinite quality of teaching the dharma: no matter how many teachings he shared, the treasure never lessened.

The iconography representation of the treasure vase is often very similar to the kumbha, one of the few possessions permitted a bhikkhu or bhikkhuni in Theravada Buddhism. The wisdom urn or treasure vase is used in many empowerment (Vajrayana) and initiations.

=== Dharmachakra ===
The dharmachakra

The Dharmachakra or "Wheel of the Law" (Sanskrit; Tibetan: ཆོས་ཀྱི་འཁོར་ལོ་, THL: chö kyi khorlo) represents Gautama Buddha and the Dharma teaching. This symbol is commonly used by Tibetan Buddhists, where it sometimes also includes an inner wheel of the Gankyil (Tibetan). Nepalese Buddhists do not use the Wheel of Law in the eight auspicious symbols.

Instead of the Dharmachakra, a fly-whisk may be used as one of the Ashtamangala to symbolize Tantric manifestations. It is made of a yak's tail attached to a silver staff, and used in ritual recitation and during fanning the deities in pujas. Prayer wheels take the form of a Dharmachakra guise.

=== Victory banner ===
Dhvaja

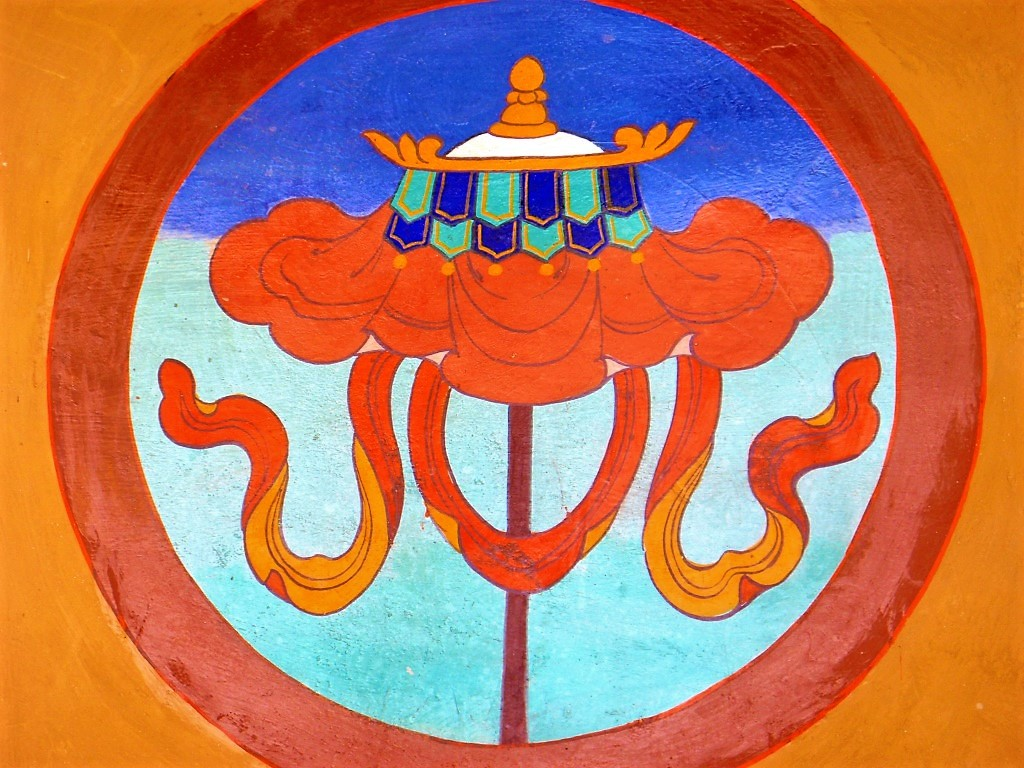
Auspicious symbol – Victory Banner. Likir Monastery.

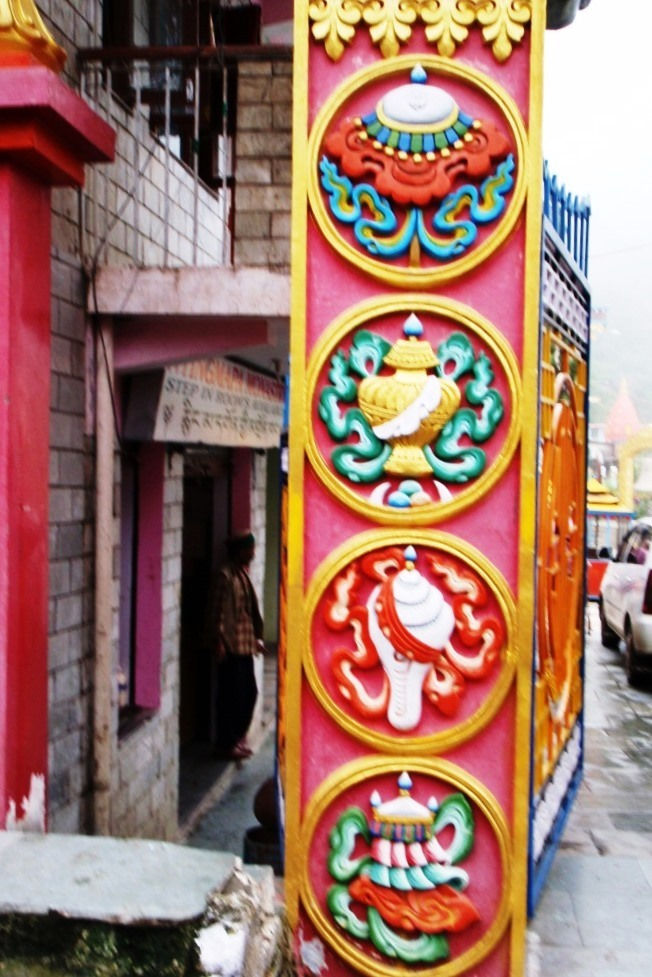
Four auspicious symbols. Mandi.

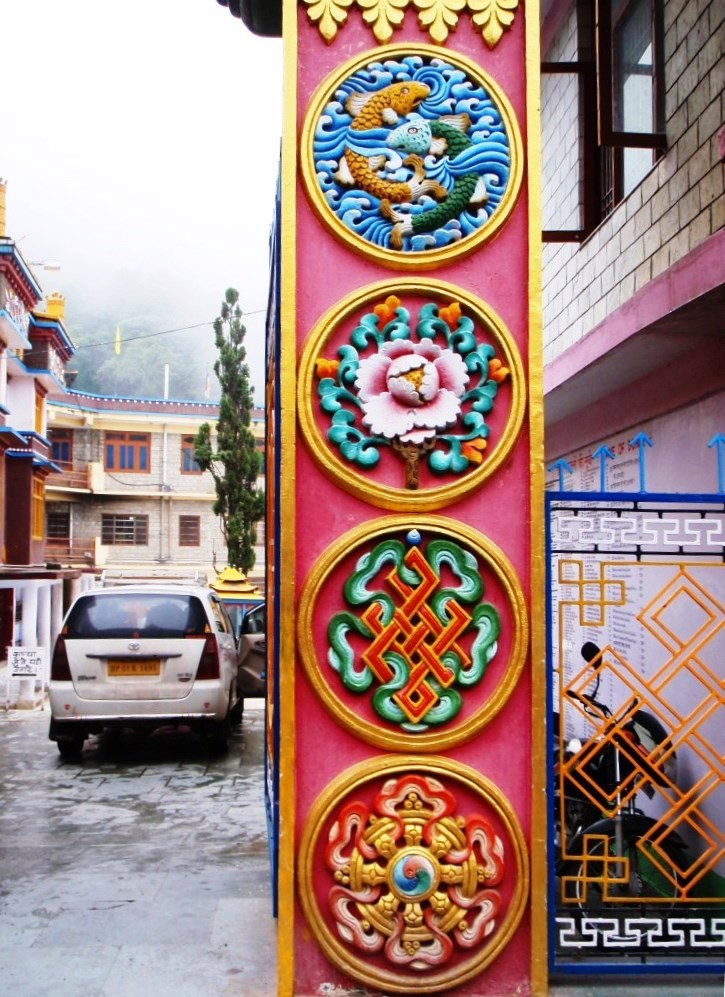
Auspicious symbols. Mandi.

The dhvaja (Sanskrit; Tibetan: རྒྱལ་མཚན་, THL: gyeltsen) "banner, flag" was a military standard of ancient Indian warfare. The symbol represents the Buddha's victory over the four māras, or hindrances in the path of enlightenment. These hindrances are pride, desire, disturbing emotions, and the fear of death. Within the Tibetan tradition, a list of eleven different forms of the victory banner is given to represent eleven specific methods for overcoming defilement. Many variations of the dhvaja's design can be seen on the roofs of Tibetan monasteries to symbolise the Buddha's victory over four māras. Banners are placed at the four corners of monastery and temple roofs. The cylindrical banners placed on monastery roofs are often made of beaten copper.

=== Sequences of symbols ===
Different traditions order the eight symbols differently.

Here is the sequential order of the Eight Auspicious Symbols of Nepali Buddhism:

1. Endless knot
2. Lotus flower
3. Dhvaja
4. Dharmachakra (fly-whisk in Nepali Buddhism)
5. Bumpa (treasure vase)
6. Golden Fish
7. Parasol
8. Conch

The sequential order for Chinese Buddhism was defined in the Qing dynasty as:

1. Dharmachakra
2. Conch
3. Dhvaja
4. Parasol
5. Lotus flower
6. Bumpa (treasure vase)
7. Golden Fish
8. Endless knot

== Hinduism ==
In Indian and Hindu tradition, the Ashtamangala may be used during certain occasions including: pujas, weddings (of Hindus), and coronations. The ashtamangala finds wide mention in the texts associated with Hinduism, Buddhism, and Jainism. They have been depicted in decorative motifs and cultural artifacts.

- The Hindu tradition lists them as:
  - lion called raja
  - bull called vrishaba
  - serpent called naga
  - pitcher called kalasha
  - necklace called vaijayanti
  - kettledrum called bheri
  - fan called vyajana
  - lamp called dipa
- The Hindu tradition lists them as:
  - fly-whisk
  - full vase
  - mirror
  - elephant goad
  - drum
  - lamp
  - flag
  - a pair of fish.
- The list also differs depending on the place, region, and the social groups.

== Jainism ==
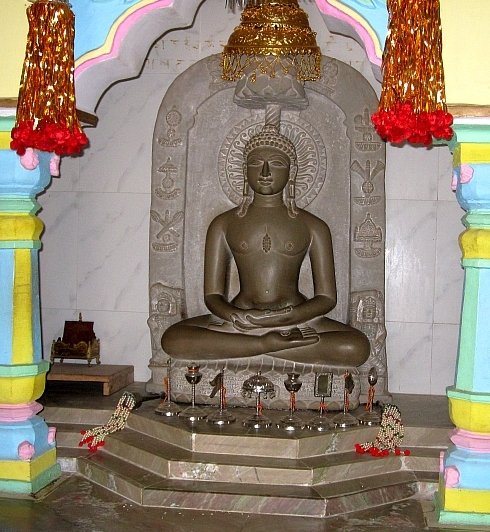
Adinath image with Ashtamangala placed in front of it, according to Digambara tradition

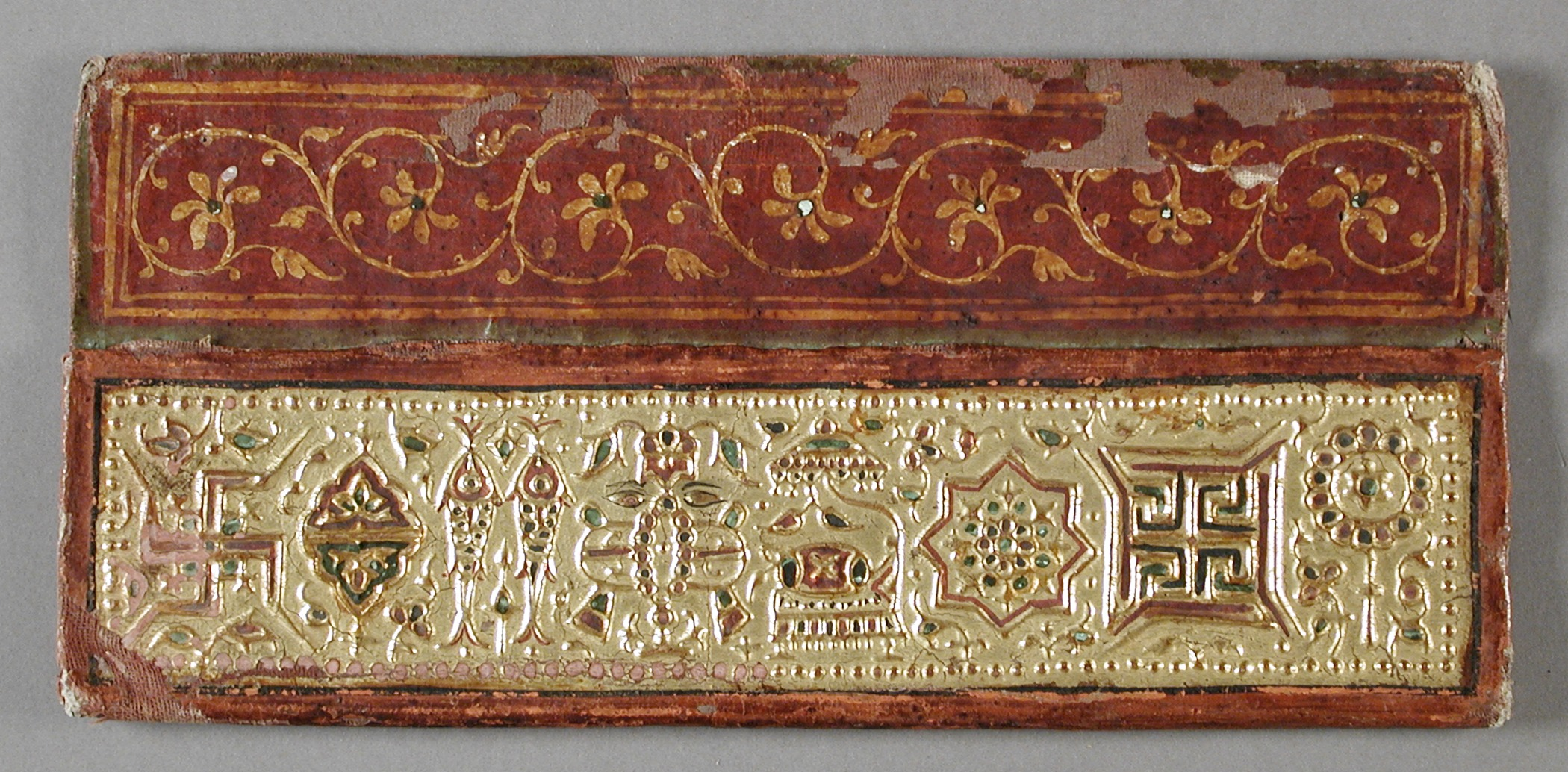
Ashtamangala, according to Svetambara tradition, on Jain manuscript cover, LACMA M.72.53.22 (from left) : Swastika, Vardhmanaka (food vessel), Pair of fish, Kalasha (pot), Bhadrasana (seat), Srivatsa, Nandavarta, Darpan (mirror)

In Jainism, the Ashtamangala are a set of eight auspicious symbols. There is some variation among different traditions concerning the eight symbols.

In the Digambara tradition, the eight symbols are:

1. Parasol
2. Dhvaja
3. Kalasha
4. Chamara
5. Mirror
6. Chair
7. Hand fan
8. Vessel

In the Śvētāmbara tradition, the eight symbols are:

1. Swastika
2. Srivatsa
3. Nandavarta
4. Vardhmanaka (food vessel)
5. Bhadrasana (seat)
6. Kalasha (pot)
7. Darpana (mirror)
8. Pair of fish

== See also ==
- Dzi bead
- Eight Treasures (Chinese equivalent)
- Iconography
- Mani stone
- Sandpainting
