= Kalasha =

Metal pot used in Hindu rites

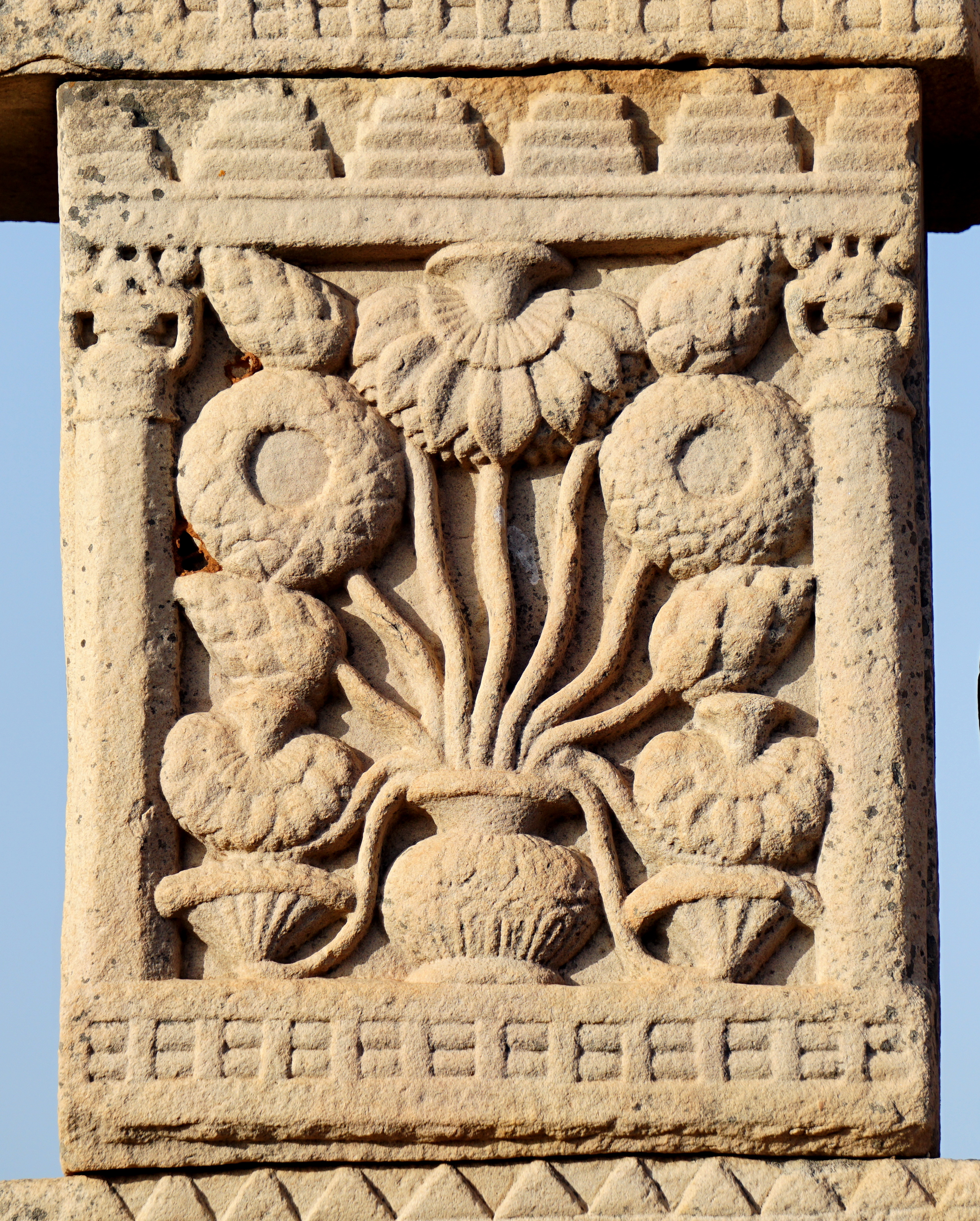
The Pūrṇa-Kalaśa or Pūrṇa-Ghaṭa with "Padmotpalakumudvat" - overflowing pot with Padma (lotus), Utpala (blue water-lily) and Kumuda (white water-lily), 1st century BCE depiction.

A kalasha, also called Pūrṇa-Kalaśa, Pūrṇa-Kumbha, Pūrṇa-Ghaṭa, also called ghat or ghot or kumbh (Sanskrit: कलश kalaśa, Telugu: కలశము Kannada: ಕಳಶ literally "pitcher, pot"), is a metal (brass, copper, silver or gold) pot with a large base and small mouth. It is employed in the rituals in Hindu, Jain, and Buddhist traditions as a ceremonial offering to the deity or to an honoured guest and as an auspicious symbol used to decorate shrines and buildings.

Sometimes "kalasha" also refers to such a pot filled with water and topped with a coronet of mango leaves and a coconut. This combination is often used in Hindu rites and depicted in Hindu iconography. The entire arrangement is called Purna-Kalasha (पूर्णकलश), Purna-Kumbha (पूर्णकुम्भ), or Purna-ghata (पूर्णघट). Each of these names literally means "full or complete vessel" when the pot is referred to as the Kalasha (to avoid confusion, this article will refer to the pot as Kalasha and the entire arrangement as Purna-Kalasha).

Sometimes the Kalasha is filled with coins, grain, gems, gold, or a combination of these items instead of water. The coronet of 5, 7, or 11 mango leaves is placed such that the tips of the leaves touch water in the Kalasha. The coconut is sometimes wrapped with a red cloth and red thread; the top of the coconut (called Shira – literally "head") is kept uncovered. A sacred thread is tied around the metal pot. The Shira is kept facing the sky.

The Kalasha is viewed as an auspicious object in Jainism. The Kalasha is used as a ceremonial object as well as a decorative motif in Indian art and architecture. The Kalasha motif was used in decorating bases and capitals of pillars during 1st century BCE and 1st century CE. Before their depiction on stone, terracotta kalash were used as decorative feature placed on roof-tops of buildings and it is now mostly used on temples roofs called Mandir Kalasha.

== In Hinduism ==
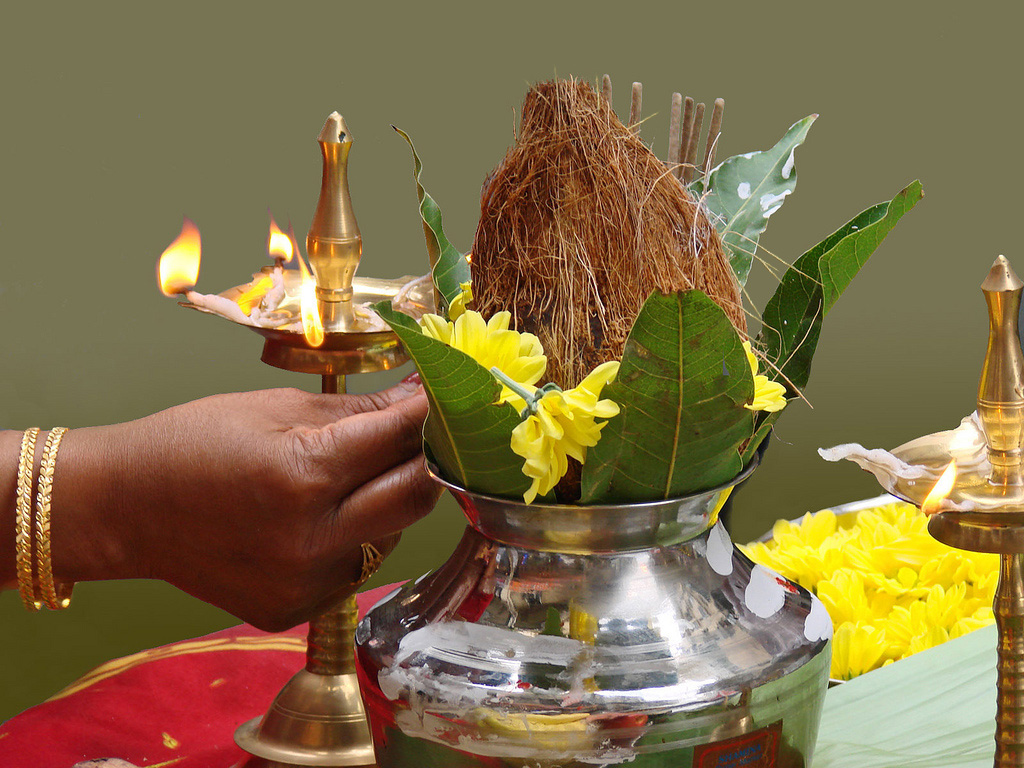
Worship of a Kalasha

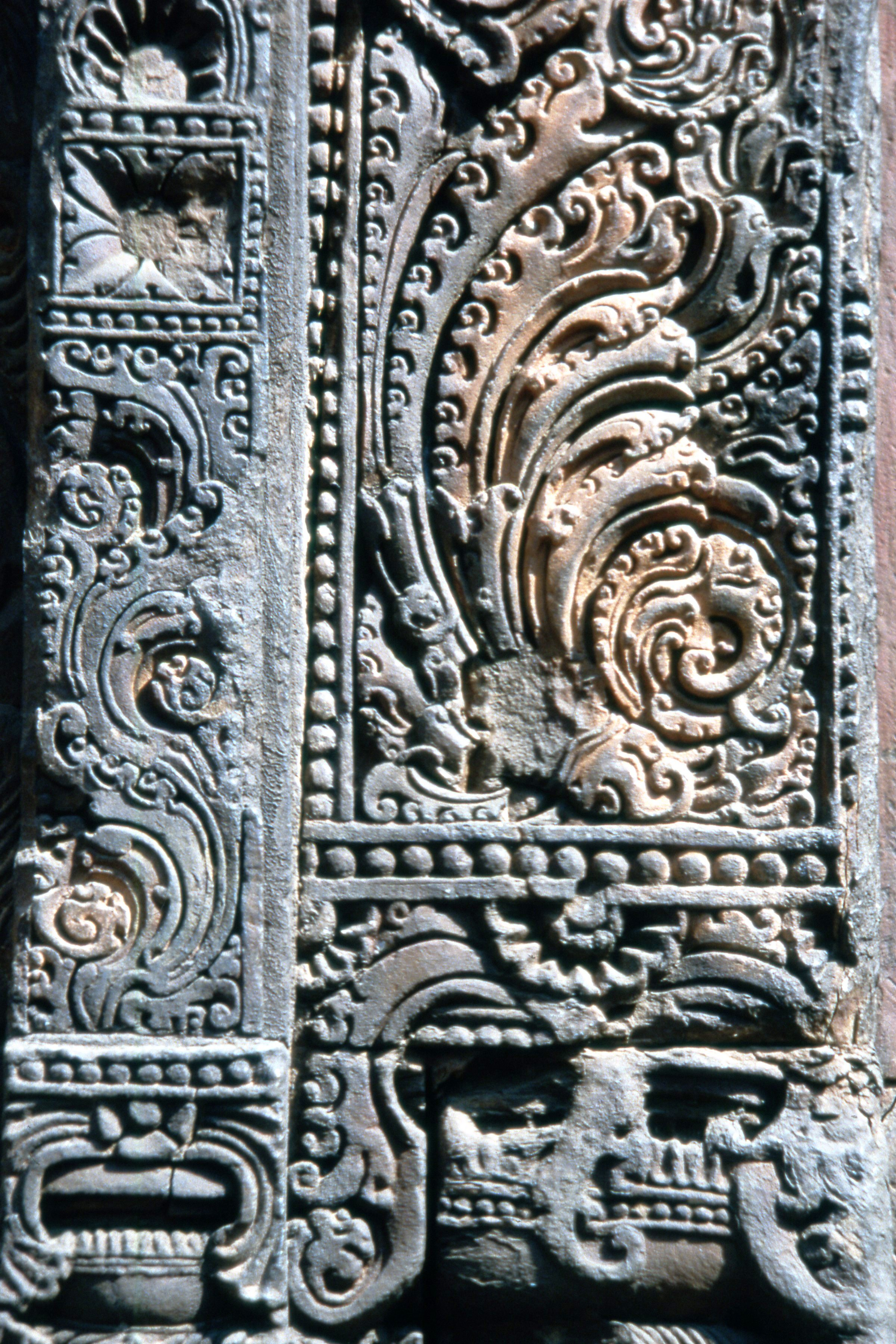
Relief detail on Baitala Deula temple with the symbol of Purna Kalasha surrounded by garlands.

The Purna-Kalasha is considered a symbol of abundance and "source of life" in the Vedas. Purna-Kumbha is preeminently a Vedic motif, known from the time of Rigveda. It is also called Soma-Kalasha, Chandra-Kalasha, Indra-Kumbha, Purnaghata, Purna-Virakamsya, Bhadra ghata, or Mangala ghata. It is referred to as "overflowing full vase" (purno-asya Kalasha) in the Vedas.

The Kalasha is believed to contain amrita, the elixir of life, and thus is viewed as a symbol of abundance, wisdom, and immortality. The Kalasha is often seen in Hindu iconography as an attribute, in the hands of Hindu deities like the creator god Brahma, the destroyer god Shiva as a teacher, and the goddess of prosperity Lakshmi.

The Purna-Kalasha is believed to be a symbol of auspiciousness embodying either Ganesha, remover of obstacles, or his mother Gauri, the goddess of household bounty or Lakshmi. The Purna-Kalasha is worshipped in all Hindu festivities related to marriage and childbirth, as a mother goddess or Devi. In this context, the metal pot or Kalasha represents material things: a container of fertility - the earth and the womb, which nurtures and nourishes life. The mango leaves associated with Kama, the god of love, symbolize the pleasure aspect of fertility. The coconut, a cash crop, represents prosperity and power. The water in the pot represents the life-giving ability of Nature.

Sometimes, a silver or brass face of the Goddess is attached over the coconut of the Purna-Kalasha. In this form, the Purna-Kalasha symbolizes the Goddess as the manifestation of mother earth with her water, minerals, and vegetation. This method of Kalash pooja (worship) has come in for Vishnu in household functions too.

The Purna-Kalasha is also worshipped at Hindu ceremonies like Griha Pravesha (house warming), child naming, havan (fire-sacrifice), Vaastu dosha rectification, and daily worship.

Other interpretations of the Purna-Kalasha associate with the five elements or the chakras. The wide base of metal pot represents the element Prithvi (Earth), the expanded centre - Ap (water), neck of pot - Agni (fire), the opening of the mouth - Vayu (air), and the coconut and mango leaves - Akasha (aether). In contexts of chakras, the Shira (literally "head") - top of the coconut symbolizes Sahasrara chakra and the Moola (literally "base") - base of Kalasha - the Muladhara chakra.

A kalash is placed with due rituals on all important occasions. It is placed near the entrance as a sign of welcome.

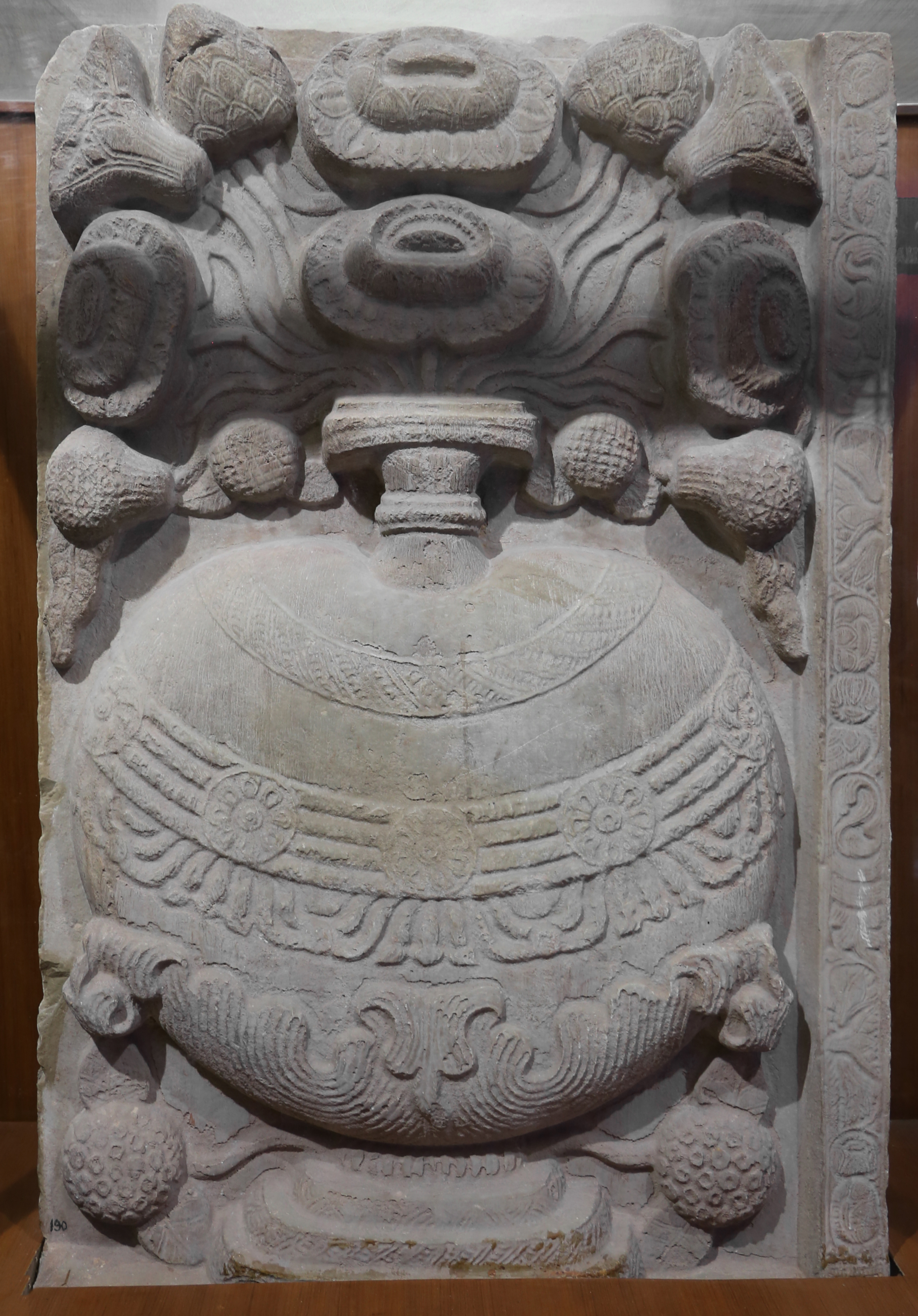
Purna Kalasha,Amaravati Stupa 1st century CE.

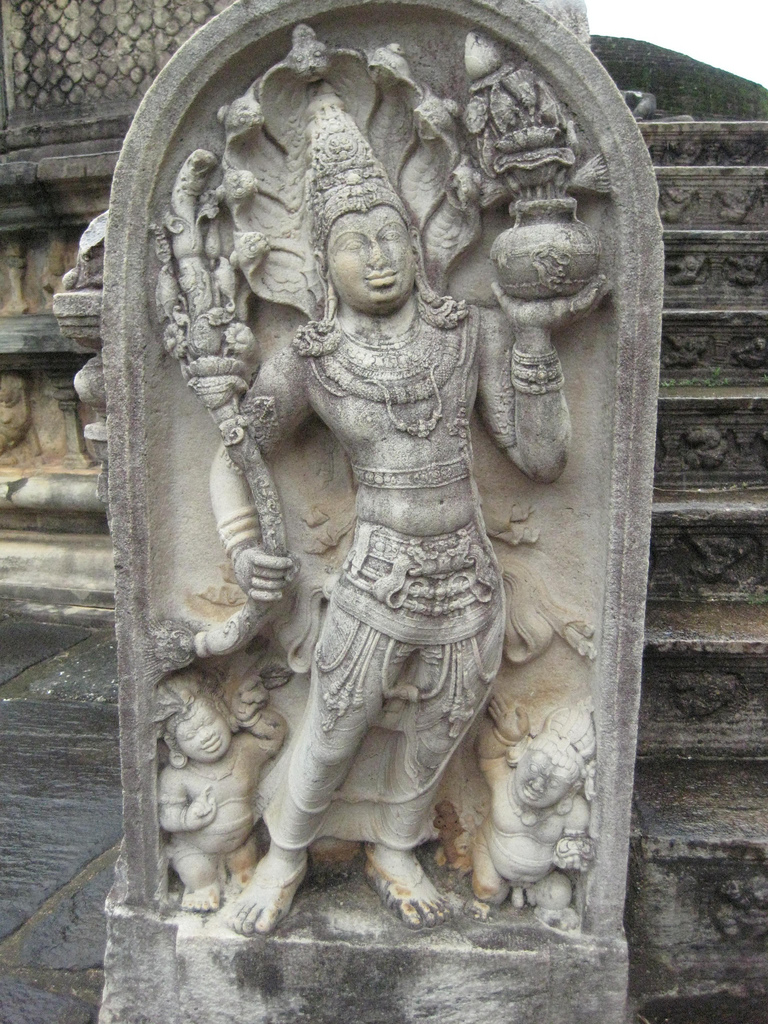
Buddhist muragala stone depicting Naga-raja holding Pūrṇakumbha with lotus flowers, ca. 600s, Sri lanka.

== In Jainism ==
The Kalasha is a symbol of the nineteenth Tirthankara Mallinatha. It is also included in the Ashtamangala lists of both the Śvetāmbara and Digambara sects of Jainism. Two eyes are depicted around the Kalasha, symbolising right faith and right knowledge. It is used for religious and social ceremonies. It is used in temples when certain images are being worshipped. When one enters a new home it is customary to carry the kalasha on the head reciting mantras. This ceremony is performed to welcome grace and happiness into the new home. They first appear in stone in during 1st century BCE and 1st century CE.

== Buddhism ==
The Pūrṇakumbha refers to “full vessel” or "auspicious abundance" in Buddhism. It is used as flower offering to Buddha and Bodhisattvas at prayer alters, as well as representing treasure of wisdom. Purnakumbha represents health, longevity, wealth, prosperity, wisdom and symbolizes the Buddha's infinite quality of teaching the dharma. Japanese art of Ikebana emerged from this Buddhist floral offering tradition.

== In heraldry ==
A variant of the Kalasha called Purna Kumbha or Purna Ghataka from Amaravati archaeological site is part of the official state emblem of Andhra Pradesh state in India.

== See also ==
- Bumpa
- Kumbha
