= Talamana =

Traditional system of Indian iconometry

Talamana (Sanskrit: tāla māna) is a traditional system of Indian iconometry based on the Shilpa Shastras, which uses certain measurements and proportions in creating temple icons and images.

== See also ==
- Artistic canons of body proportions#Classical India
- Hindu iconography
