= Hindu iconography =

Iconic symbols with spiritual meaning in Hinduism

The Sri Chakra, frequently called the Sri Yantra, represents the goddess in her form of Shri Lalitha or Tripura Sundari

Over the course of two millennia of its development, Hinduism has developed a tradition of iconography comprising symbols, images, gestures, and other visual forms associated with its beliefs and practices and derived from scriptural sources. The exact significance accorded to these visual forms varies with region, historical period, and Hindu tradition. Over time some of the symbols, for instance the Swastika has come to have wider association while others like Om are recognized as unique representations of Hinduism. Other aspects of Hindu iconography are covered by the terms murti, for icons and mudra for gestures and positions of the hands and body.

== Textual sources ==
The conventions for Hindu iconography are systematized in a body of Sanskrit textual literature, particularly the Śilpaśāstras and Āgamas, that prescribe the form, attributes, site, proportions and materials appropriate to each divine image.

=== Śilpaśāstra ===
In traditional Indian thought, śilpa refers broadly to art, craft, and skilled creation, and encompasses trades ranging from sculpture and pottery to weaving and architecture; the term carries ritual significance, as artistic work was believed to recreate divine forms through symbolic rhythm and pattern.

The concept of śāstra is central to understanding how Indian tradition treats sacred and artistic texts. Śilpaśāstra (also called shastras) form a body of theoretical writing, in both Sanskrit and vernacular languages, that provide systematic sets of rules governing artistic production, and as sources lay down the precise formal and grammatical conventions within which sacred images must be crafted.

=== Āgamas ===
The Āgamas specify the iconometric form of an image, laying down rules of proportion and measurement for the various limbs and features of the human figure, reflecting sustained attention to the beauty of the human form. The Āgamas also prescribe ritual and worship of sacred images.

=== Viṣṇudharmottara Purāṇa ===
The Viṣṇudharmottara Purāṇa deals with image creation, temple construction, and liturgical procedure. The text frames its discourse on visual and performative arts through a dialogue in which King Vajra asks the sage Markandeya about proper human conduct in Kaliyuga and how to acquire knowledge of canonical deity images. The Citrasūtra, the treatise on painting within the text, is established by Markandeya as an essential prerequisite discipline that must be mastered to understand the creation and features of sacred images.

=== Nātyaśastra ===
The Nātyaśastra, a Sanskrit treatise on dramaturgy, catalogues bodily gestures and movements, including 108 combined hand-and-foot postures (karanas), their grouping into larger gestural sequences (angahāras), and classifications of lower-body movement (cāris) and performative forms (mandalas). This text serves as a resource for interpreting the postures and hand gestures (mudras) depicted in Hindu temple sculpture.

== Hindu sacraments ==
Hindu sacraments are physical pieces of that help objects or markings that are considered sacred and used as a sign of devotion by the followers of Hinduism. These are often objects associated with a puja (prayer) or religious ceremony.

=== Murti ===
Murtis (Sanskrit: मूर्ति) are sacred works of art, primarily in the form of statues and paintings, which serve as representations of divinity, for use during religious devotion. Murtis are a huge part of contemporary mainstream Hindu culture and often hold significant sentimental value in many Hindu homes. Many believe that murtis are vessels that capture the essence of gods, which helps the devotees focus and concentrate during prayers. Although there are many Hindu gods, the most common murtis are depictions of Ganesha, Hanuman, Shiva, and Lakshmi. Each deity appeals to certain aspects of human life, for example Lakshmi is the goddess of fortune and the embodiment of love, while Hanuman is worshipped for strength and loyalty.

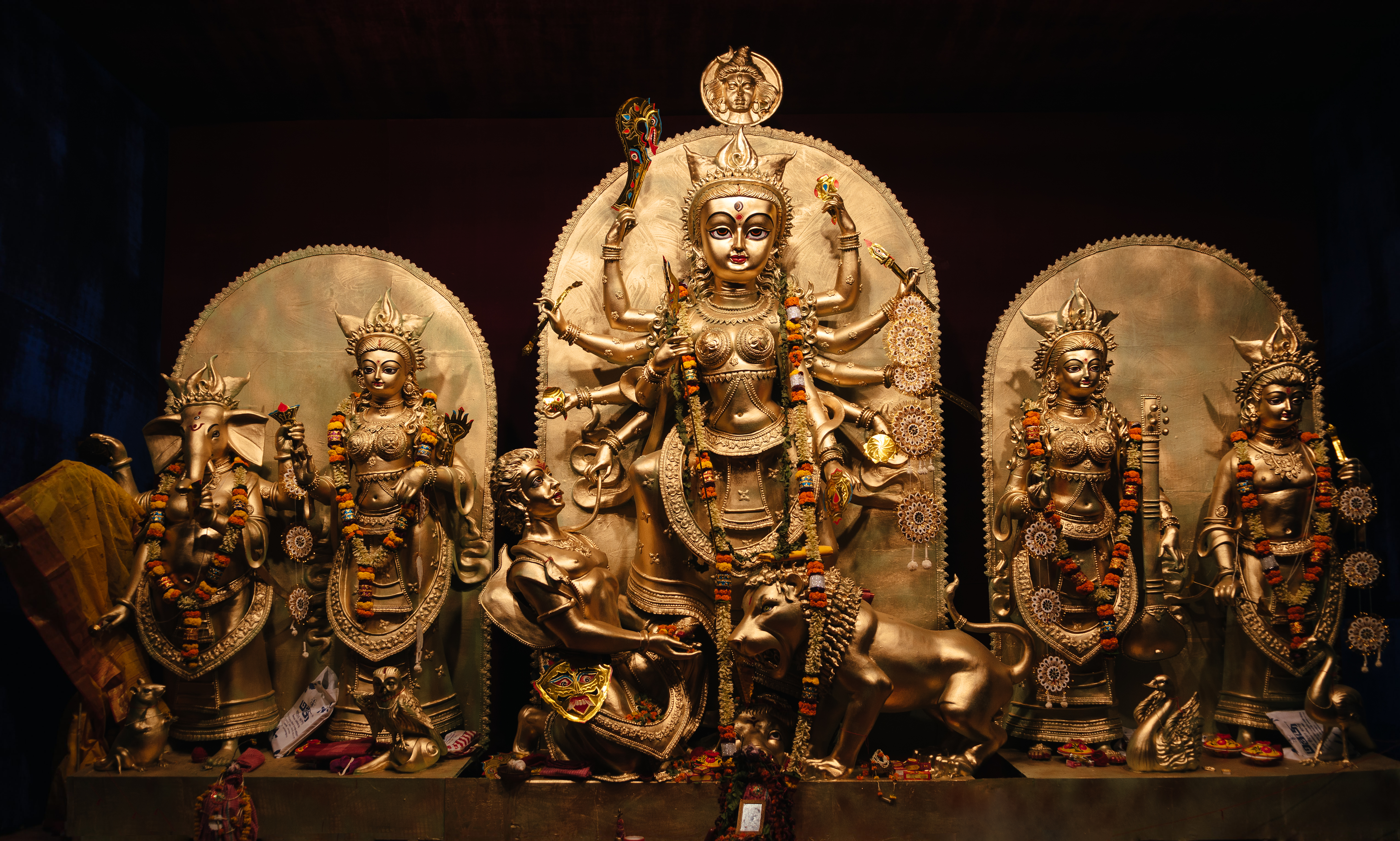
Goddess Durga and a pantheon of other gods and goddesses being worshipped during Durga Puja Festival in Kolkata. This image was taken in Block - G.D, Saltlake Durga Puja 2018 in North Kolkata.

=== Tilaka ===
The tilaka (or tilak) is a mark worn on the forehead or other parts of the body as a sign of spiritual devotion. Hindus may wear a tilaka regularly or especially on religious occasions. The shape of the tilaka is often an indicator of devotion to a certain deity. For example, the U-shaped urdhva pundra usually denotes devotion to Vishnu, while Shiva devotees often wear it in the form of three horizontal lines. It may be made of saffron, vermilion, turmeric, clay, or simply ash.

To denote marriage and auspiciousness, married Hindu women commonly wear a decorative vermilion dot or bindu, or bindī on the forehead. This is analogous to a wedding ring worn in western countries. In southern India, the mark is called pottu (or bottu). The exact shape, size and location of the bindi or pottu shows regional variation; for instance, in some parts of India the bindi is often worn just below the hairline, while in southern India it is more common to wear it between the eyebrows. In east India, especially in West Bengal, traditionally larger bindis are worn as mark of devotion towards goddess Durga.

=== Vibhuti ===
Vibhuti (☰) is the holy ash obtained from sacred puja rites involving fire. Ash is considered a sign of purity due to its powdery white colour. It is used on the forehead, normally as three horizontal lines representing Shiva. Some Hindus meld both the three horizontal vibhuti lines of Shiva and the U-shaped urdhva pundra of Vishnu in an amalgam marker signifying Hari-Hara (Vishnu-Shiva). In addition, sacred ash signifies that the body's origin is from dust and ash, acting a marker of impermanence and a reminder of the illusory nature (maya) of existence.

=== Rudraksha ===
Rudraksha (📿) are seeds of the rudraksha tree that represent the tears of Shiva (also known as Rudra). They are often threaded into a necklace and used as a rosary to accompany prayer and meditation.

== Universal symbols ==
Among the most revered symbols in Hinduism, three are a quintessential part of its culture, and are most representative of its general ethos:

=== Om ===
Om (or Aum, ॐ) is the sacred sound symbol that represents the universe; the ultimate reality (Brahman). It is prefixed and sometimes suffixed to all Vedic mantras and prayers. Aum is often said to represent God in the three aspects of Brahman (A), Vishnu (U) and Shiva (M). As the divine primordial vibration, it represents the one ultimate reality underlying and encompassing all of nature and all of existence. The written syllable ॐ called omkara serves as a deeply significant and distinctly recognizable symbol for Hinduism. The pronunciation of Aum moves through all possible human linguistic vowel sounds and is different from the pronunciation of Om. Both are often symbolically equated, although they are sonically distinct.

=== Swastika ===
Swastika is a symbol connoting general auspiciousness, or a sign of prosperity or favour. This is so most naturally with astronomy as Ursa Major circumscribes Polaris in each 360 degrees. As an esoterica, the implication of the symbol is that of eternity; that is, "it is this way, it has always been this way, and it will always be this way." Just as Solaris' and Luna's circuits imply an eternally infinite system, so too, does the entire zodiac.

It may represent purity of soul, truth, and stability or, alternatively, Surya, the sun. Its rotation in four directions has been used to represent many ideas, but primarily describes the four directions, the four Vedas and their harmonious whole. Its use in Hinduism dates back to ancient times, however the earliest records of swastikas were imprinted on pottery from central Mesopotamia and at Susa in western Iran in 4000 B.C.

=== Sri Chakra Yantra ===
The Sri Chakra Yantra of Tripura Sundari (commonly referred to as Sri Yantra) is a mandala formed by nine interlocking triangles. Four of these triangles are oriented upright, representing Shiva or the masculine principle. Five of these triangles are inverted triangles representing Shakti, the feminine principle. Together, the nine triangles form a web symbolic of the entire cosmos, a womb symbolic of creation, and together express Advaita Vedanta or non-duality. All other yantras are said to be derivatives of this supreme yantra.

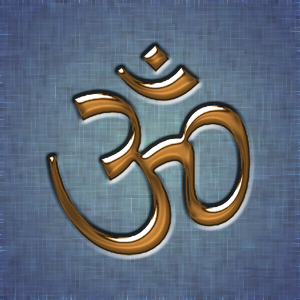
Om (Aum)

Swastika

Sri Chakra Yantra

== Symbols associated with individual deities ==
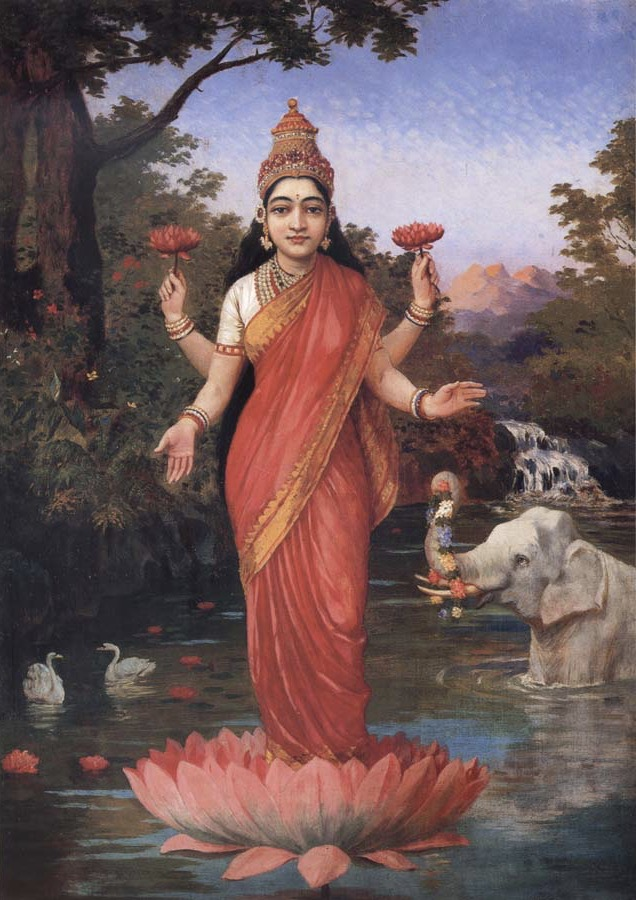
Goddess Lakshmi holding and standing on a lotus.

Several symbols (animals, flora, instruments, weapons, or even colour) in Hindu iconography are associated with particular devas, and vice versa. In certain cases the deities themselves are personifications of natural forces, for instance Agni (fire), Vayu (wind), Surya (Sun) and Prithvi (Earth). In other instances, the associations arise from specific incidents or characteristics related in Hindu theology. The iconography serve to identify the particular deity in their pictorial or sculptural representations. The symbolism also often links the deities with a particular natural or human attribute, or profession.

This symbolism is featured in also allegorical references in Hindu scriptures, such as the Puranas, as well as in secular Indian literature. Temple design and ornamentation follow the Shilpa Shastras and Agamas, which detail the iconographic significance of architectural sculptures. Historically, education in these fields involved a twelve-year period of theoretical and practical training under an experienced teacher.

=== Shiva Lingam ===
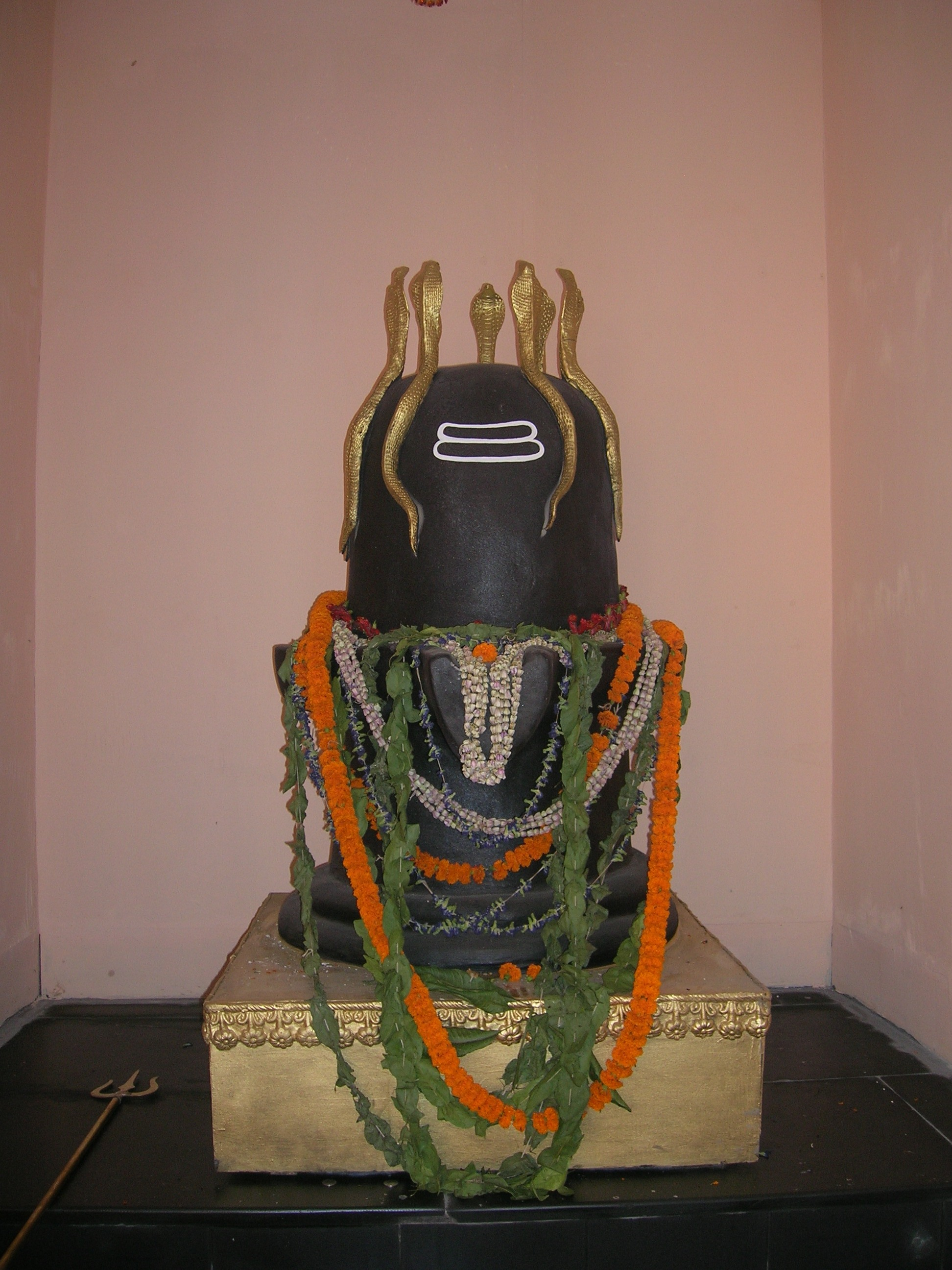
Shiva Lingam

The Shiva Lingam represents the deity Shiva, and is used as an icon of strength and fertility due to its sexual symbolism.

==== Meaning ====
The word ‘Shivalinga’ is a combination of the words ‘Shiva’ (auspiciousness) and linga (sign or symbol). Thus ‘Shivalinga’ is a representation of Shiva in His all-auspicious aspect. Linga has been translated as phallus, which refers to his aspect of the masculine principle. ‘Linga’ also means the place of dissolution of the disintegrated universe.

==== Types ====
Based on the mobility of the object of worship, Shivalingas are broadly divided into two categories – ‘Cala’ and ‘Acala’

===== Cala Shivalinga =====
These are made of stone, crystal, metals, clay, rice, dough, etc. These can be moved from one place to another.

===== Acala Shivalingas =====
The sacred texts describe many types of the lingas based on variations in the proportion

Shivalingas are installed in temples and are fixed to ground or a base. They are usually made of stones or metals. The sacred texts suggest that the shivalinga must have three parts. A bottom most 1/3rd part that is in the earth - Brahma bhagam (represents Brahma, the Creator of the World) it is rectangular in cross section. A middle 1/3rd part is called Vishnu bhagam or Vishnu Bhaga (represents Vishnu, the Protector and sustainer of the world) it is octagonal in cross section. Both the Brahma bhagam and Vishnu bhagam are embedded in peetham (the ornamental pedestal). A visible 1/3rd Shiva Pooja bhagam or Pooja bhaga (also known as Rudra bhagam or Rudra bhaga) which is the top most part which is worshipped. It is circular in cross section and cylindrical in shape. It represents Rudra (Shiva), the destroyer of the world. It is known as Pooja bhagam because this part is worshipped. Brahmasutras: These are certain essential lines present on the Rudra bhagam (Rudra bhaga). Without them a Shivlinga is unfit to be worshipped. The Shiva linga is at the level of ground and easily accessible to the worshippers irrespective of their caste, social or economic status.

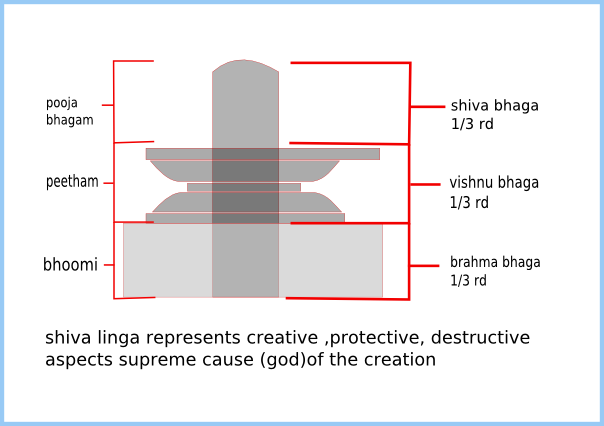

=== Lotus ===
The lotus is associated with the creation theology as well as the gods Vishnu, Brahma, and Lakshmi. It is the symbol of beauty and fertility. "In the Bhagavad Gita, a human is adjured to be like the lotus; they should work without attachment, dedicating their actions to God, untouched by sin like water on a lotus leaf, like a beautiful flower standing high above the mud and water."

=== Veena ===
The musical instrument Veena is associated with the Hindu goddess Saraswati and the sage Narada. Its origin lies in south India as it was used in Carnatic classical music. Furthermore its a symbol of arts and learning.

=== Conch ===
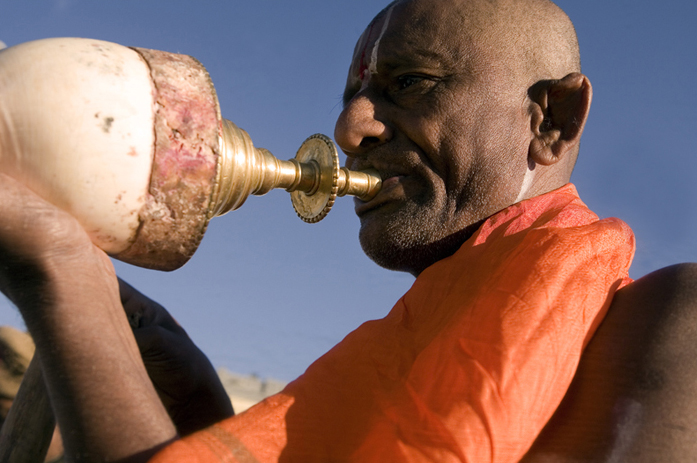
A Hindu pandit (priest) blowing the conch during puja.

The conch shell is a major Hindu article of prayer, used as a trumpeting announcement of all sorts. In Vaishnavism, the god of preservation, Vishnu, is said to hold a special conch, Panchajanya, that represents life as it has come out of life-giving waters. In the story of Dhruva the divine conch plays a special part. The warriors of ancient India would blow conch shells to announce battle, such as is famously represented in the beginning of the war of Kurukshetra in the Mahabharata, a famous Hindu epic. The conch shell is also a deep part of Hindu symbolic and religious tradition. Today most Hindus use the conch as a part of their religious practices, blowing it during worship at specific points, accompanied by ceremonial bells. Shankha also symbolizes the sound that created the universe and stands for knowledge.

=== Chakra ===
The Chakra or disc-like weapon of Vishnu is often found mounted on the top of Vaishnava temples or incorporated into architectural designs. Images depicting Vishnu's four-armed Narayana form almost always include the Chakra in one of his hands. It is a general symbol for protection. Chakra is also known to symbolize the need to follow dharma and to condemn adharma.

=== Multiple heads and arms ===
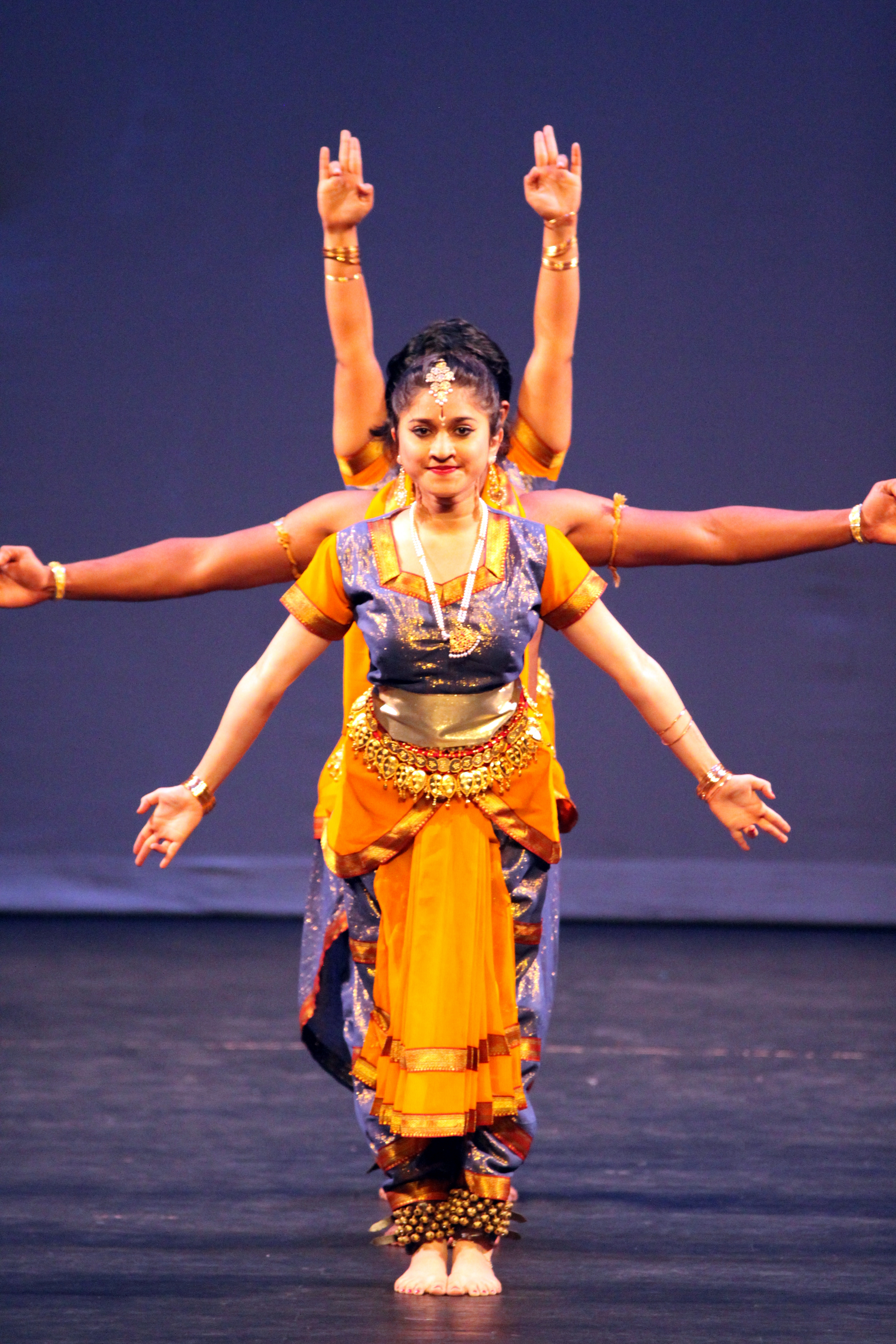
In Indian dance, the idea of multiple arms is often shown by several dancers standing behind each other with their arms in different positions.

An array of Hindu, Buddhist, and some Jain deities are often depicted with multiple heads, arms, and other body parts, creating what one author refers to as a "multiplicity convention" in religious iconography. Such multiple body parts represent the divine omnipresence and immanence (ability to be in many places at once and simultaneously exist in all places at once), and thereby the ability to influence many things at once. The specific meanings attributed to the multiple body parts of an image are symbolic, not literal in context. In such depictions, the visual effect of an array of multiple arms is to create a kinetic energy showing that ability. Several Hindu deities are depicted in their Panchamukha (five-faced) aspect, as well as their Chaturbhuja (four-armed) aspect.

=== Vāhana ===
Vāhana or vehicle, sometimes called a mount, is an animal or mythical entity closely associated with a particular deity in Hindu theology. Sometimes the deity is iconographically depicted riding and/or mounted on the vahana; other times, the vahana is depicted at the deity's side or symbolically represented as a divine attribute.

== Table of symbols ==
Hindu Gods, Deities, Mythological Figures and Their Associated Symbols
God or deity	Associated symbols	Note
Adi Parashakti	Chariot (Ratha) of seven lions, Sri Chakra	Supreme goddess in Shaktism
Brahma	Lotus, swan (hamsa), Vedas, garland of beads (akshamala)	Creator
Vishnu	Shesha, shankha, chakra, gada, lotus, Garuda, colour blue	Preserver
Shiva	Shiva Linga, Nandi, third eye, trishula (trident), crescent-moon, rudraksha, cobra, drum, tiger skin, vibhuti	Destroyer
Saraswati	White lotus, swan, peacock, veena, colour white	Goddess of learning, music, and art
Lakshmi	Red lotus, elephant, shower of gold, kumbha, owl, peacock feather	Goddess of prosperity, wealth, love, and fortune
Parvati	Lion, Nandi, trident, chakra, gada, padma, couch, cross bow, khadga	Goddess of courage, fertility, and power
Indra	Thunderbolt (vajra), rainbow, clouds	King of the devas and Svarga
Varuna	Noose (pasha)	God of duty and contracts King of the waters
Yama	Noose (pasha), danda (rod), buffalo	King of the netherworld, God of death
Surya	Chariot, sun-rays, the colour of gold	The god of the sun
Kali	Garland of severed human heads, scimitar, khanda, khapar, khadag, trident	Fierce manifestation of Parvati
Rama	Bow and arrow, the colour blue, royal panoply	Embodiment of Righteousness
Krishna	The colour blue, cow, flute, Sudarshana Chakra, milk, peacock feather	God of Compassion, love, yoga, Svayam Bhagavan
Ganesha	Aṅkuśa, mouse, modak, Aum	God of wisdom, auspiciousness, good fortune
Murugan	Peacock, vel, rooster flag	God of war and commander-in-chief of the gods
Hanuman	gada	God of strength, courage, and devotion

=== Gopura ===
It is the tower that was built on the wall of entrance. It was many storied building, up to one storied to sixteen storied. It contains many portico like kudaivarai, prasthra, karnakuta, sala, panchara, kudu. It can be seen mainly in south Indian temples with Dravidian architecture.

== See also ==
- Anthropology of religion
- Ashtamangala
- Icon
