= Nandavarta =

One of the eight auspicious symbols of Jainism for the Śvetāmbara sect

A Nandavarta, one of the Jain ashtamangala in the Śvetāmbara tradition.

The Nandavarta or Nandyavarta is one of the eight auspicious symbols of Jainism for the Śvetāmbara sect. It is an ashtamangala which is used for worship, and could be made with rice grains. It is also the symbol of 18th tirthankara Aranatha according to Śvetāmbara tradition and 7th tirthankara Suparshvanatha according to the Digambara tradition. The symbol has 4 arms with compulsorily 9 corners/ turns each.
