= Shilpa Shastras =

Ancient umbrella term for numerous Hindu texts

Shilpa Shastra
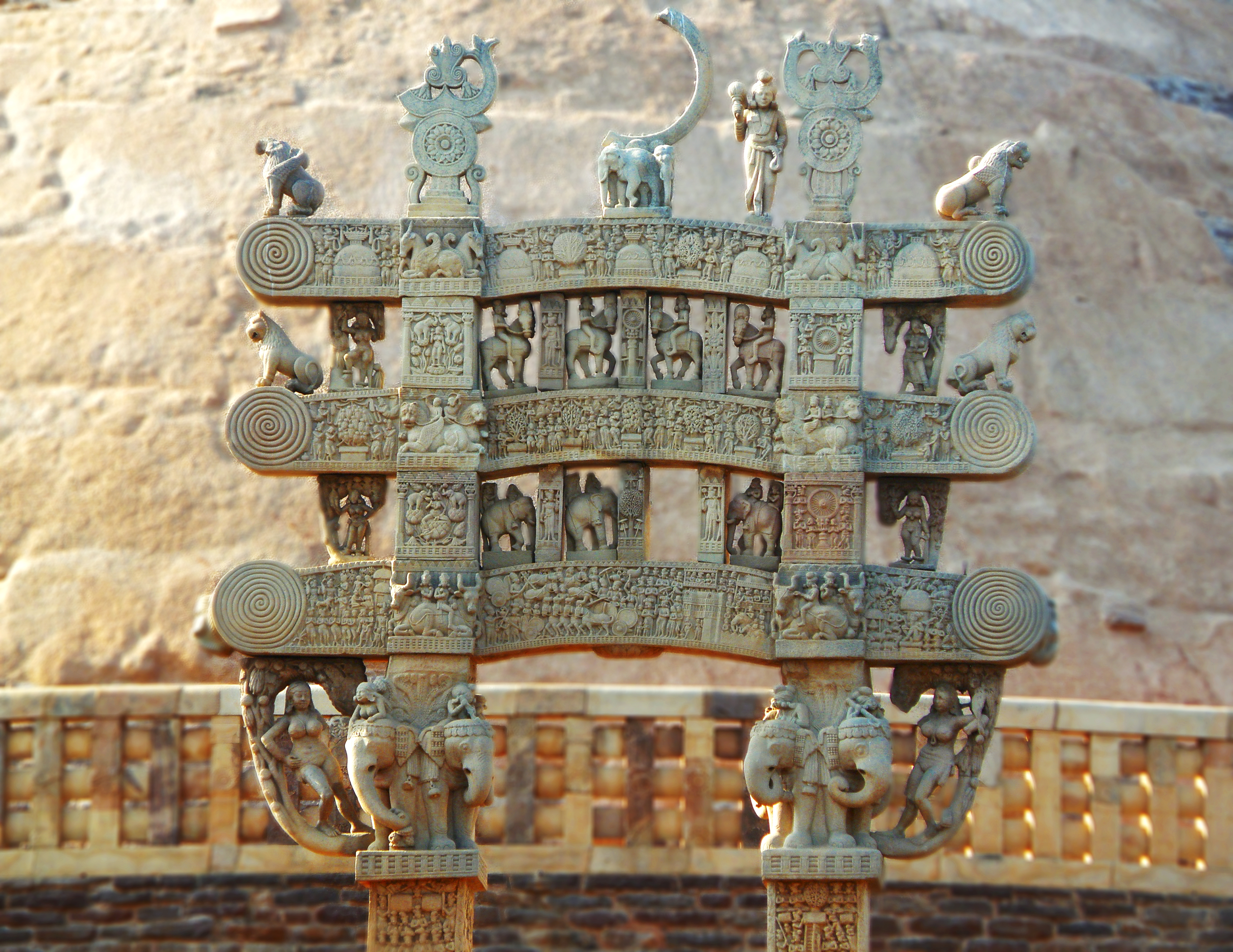
Temples

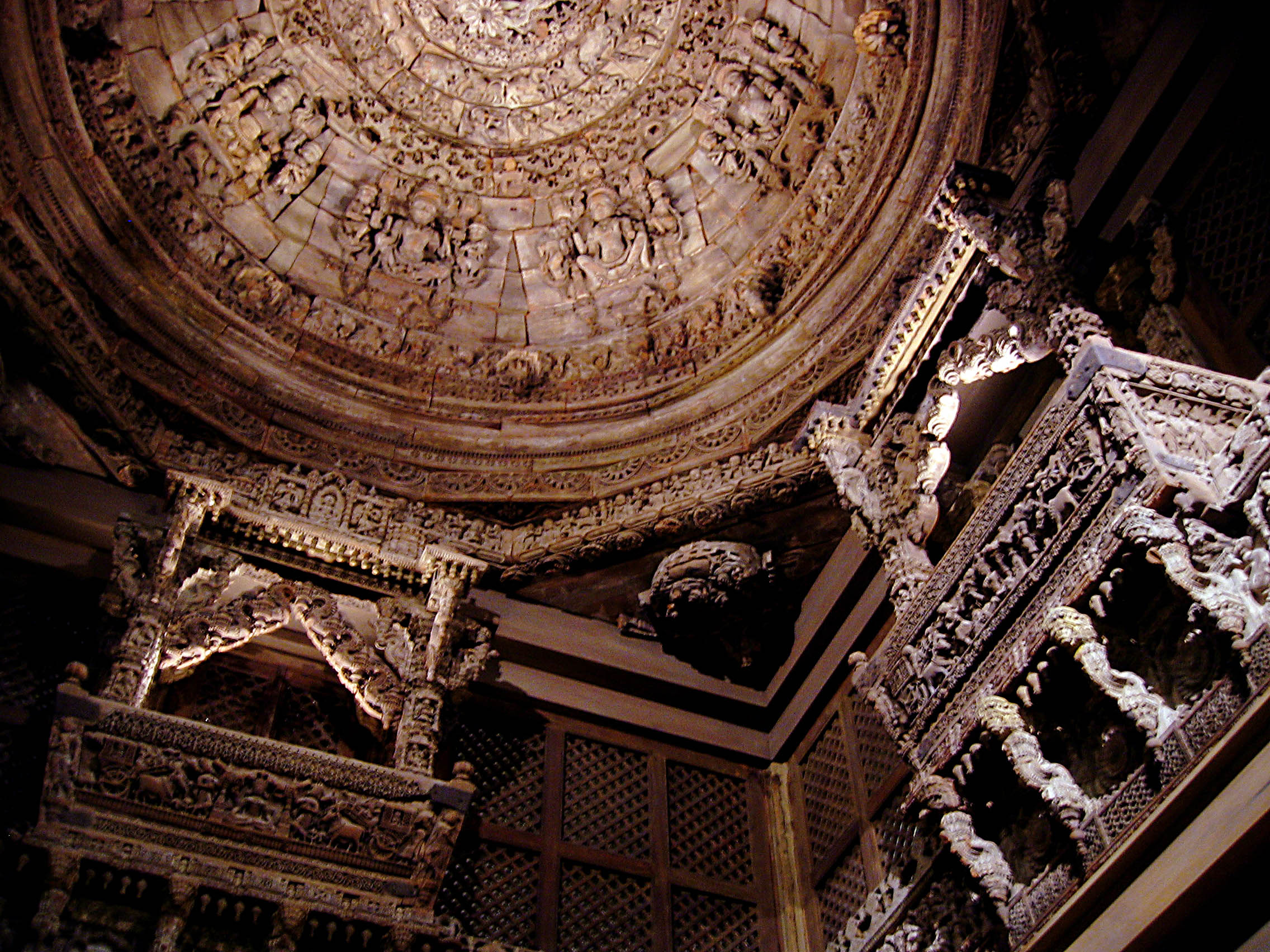
Carpentry

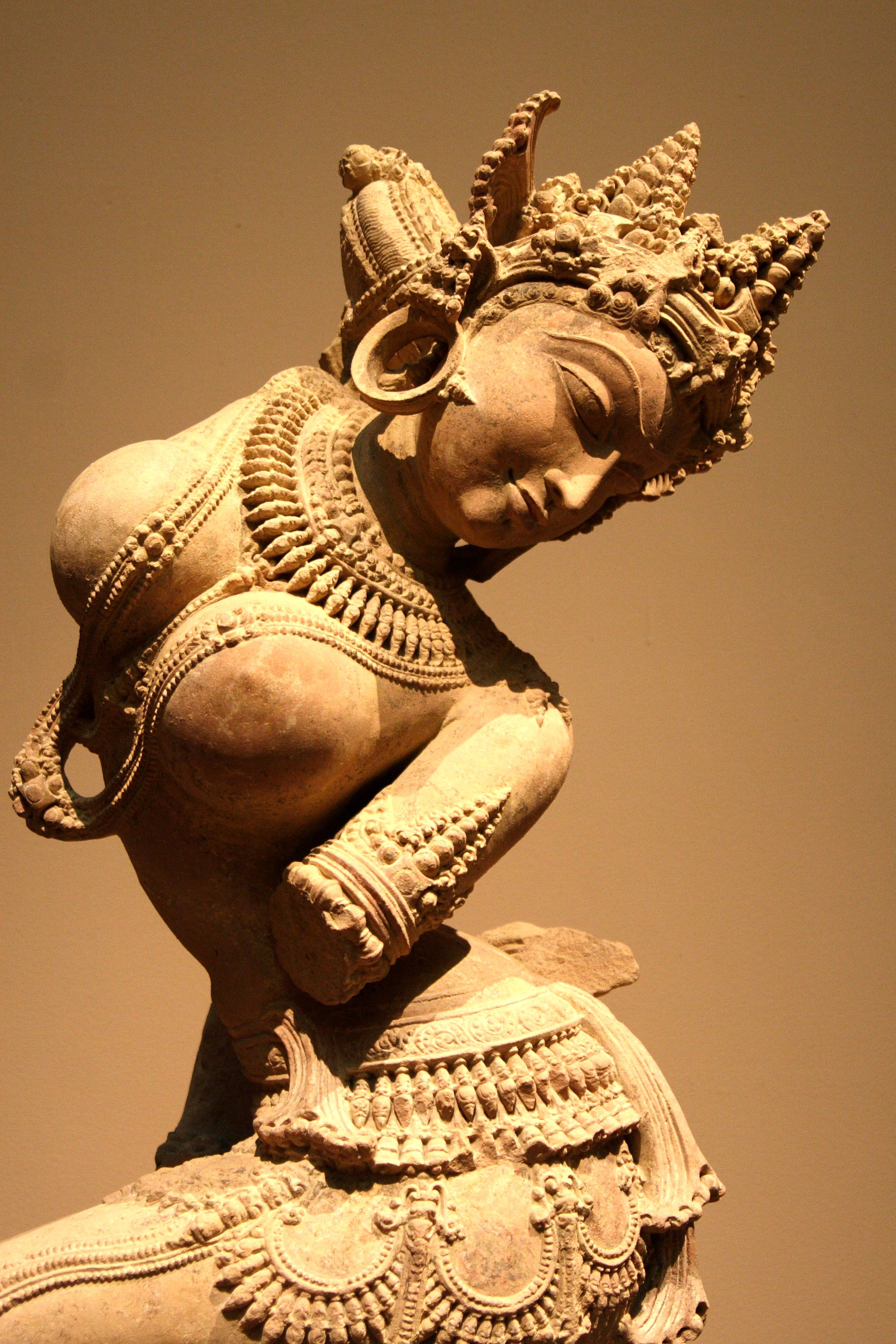
Sculpture

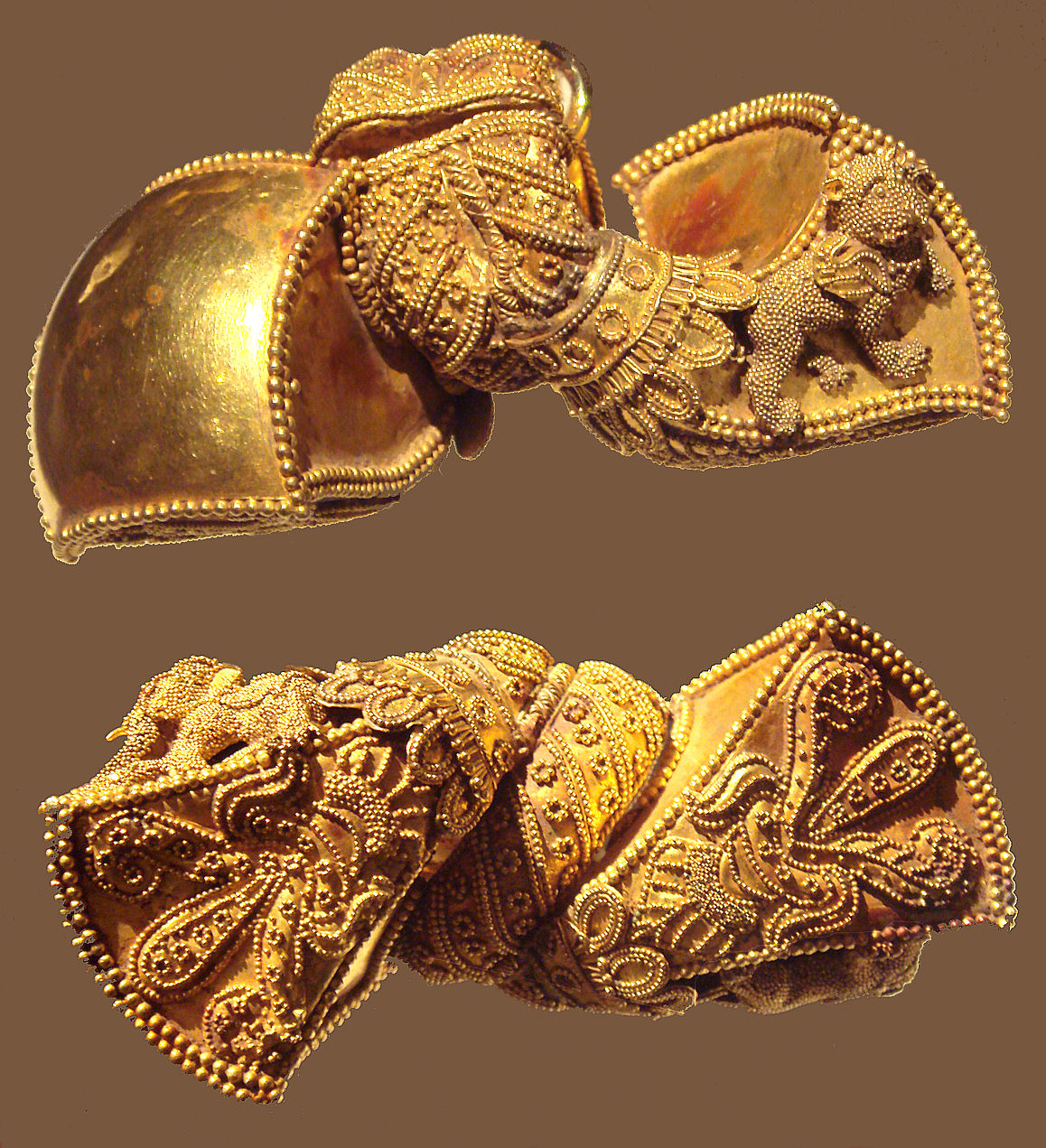
1st century BC jewelry
Shilpa Shastras are ancient texts that describe design and principles for a wide range of arts and crafts.

Shilpa Shastras (Sanskrit: शिल्प शास्त्र śilpa śāstra) literally means the Science of Shilpa (arts and crafts). It is an ancient umbrella term for numerous Hindu texts that describe arts, crafts, and their design rules, principles and standards. In the context of Hindu temple architecture and sculpture, Shilpa Shastras were manuals for sculpture and Hindu iconography, prescribing among other things, the proportions of a sculptured figure, composition, principles, meaning, as well as rules of architecture.

Sixty-four techniques for such arts or crafts, sometimes called bāhya-kalā "external or practical arts", are traditionally enumerated, including carpentry, architecture, jewellery, farriery, acting, dancing, music, medicine, poetry etc., besides sixty-four abhyantara-kalā or "secret arts", which include mostly "erotic arts" such as kissing, embracing, etc.

While Shilpa and Vastu Shastras are related, Shilpa Shastras deal with arts and crafts such as forming statues, icons, stone murals, painting, carpentry, pottery, jewellery, dying, textiles and others. Vastu Shastras deal with building architecture – building houses, forts, temples, apartments, village and town layout, etc.

== Description ==
Shilpa (शिल्प) refers to any art or craft in ancient Indian texts, while Shastra means science. Together, Shilpa Shastra means the science of art and crafts. The ancient Sanskrit texts use the term Shilpin (शिल्पिन्, male artist) and Shilpini (शिल्पिनी, female artist) for artists and crafts person, while Shilpani refers to works of arts of man.

Shilpani, works of art made by man, are imitations of divine forms; shilpa artisans, in tune with divine rhythms, produce visual interpretations in spite of the limitations of the human personality.

— Aitareya Brahmana, 6.5.27

The meaning of Shilpa, according to Stella Kramrisch, is complex. She writes that it consists of "art, skill, craft, labor, ingenuity, rite and ritual, form and creation." The range of crafts encompassed by the term Shilpa extends to every aspect of culture, includes sculptor, the potter, the perfumer, the wheelwright, the painter, the weaver, the architect, the dancer, the musician, the arts of love, and others. Ancient Indian texts assert that the number of the arts is unlimited, they deploy sixty-four kala (कला, techniques) and thirty-two vidyas (विद्या, fields of knowledge). Shilpa is discussed in Agamas, Puranas and Vastu Shastra where it is linked to the mythology of Vishvakarma.

== In painting ==
Shilpa Shastras include chapters on paintings, both miniature and large. For example, Narada Shilpa Shastra dedicates chapters 66 and 71 to painting, while Saraswati Shilpa Shastra describes various types of chitra (full painting), ardhachitra (sketch work), chitrabhasa (communication through painting), varna samskara (preparation of colors).

Other ancient Shilpa Shastra on painting include Vishnudharmottara Purana and Chitralakshana, the former is available in Sanskrit while the only surviving copies of the latter are in Tibetan (both were originally written on birch bark, and have been translated into English and German). These Sanskrit treatises discuss the following aspects of a painting: measurement, proportions, perspective of the viewer, mudra, emotions, and rasa (meaning). Such an approach to Indian paintings, states Isabella Nardi, make Shilpa Shastra not only canonical textual sources but also a means to transmit knowledge and spiritual themes.

== In carpentry ==
The first chapter of Shilpa Shastra Manasara discusses the measurement principles for carpentry. The 9th-century version of Mayamata text of Tamil Nadu and 16th-century version of Shilparatna of Odisha describe takshaka and vardhaki as wood Shilpins; takshaka possesses the knowledge of wood types and practices the art of cutting wood, while vardhaki possesses the knowledge of wood forms and practices the art of carpentry. One of the earliest mentions of carpentry arts is in Book 9, Chapter 112 of Rig Veda. Carpentry was also an essential Shilpa Shastra during the construction of a Hindu temple.

== In metallurgy ==
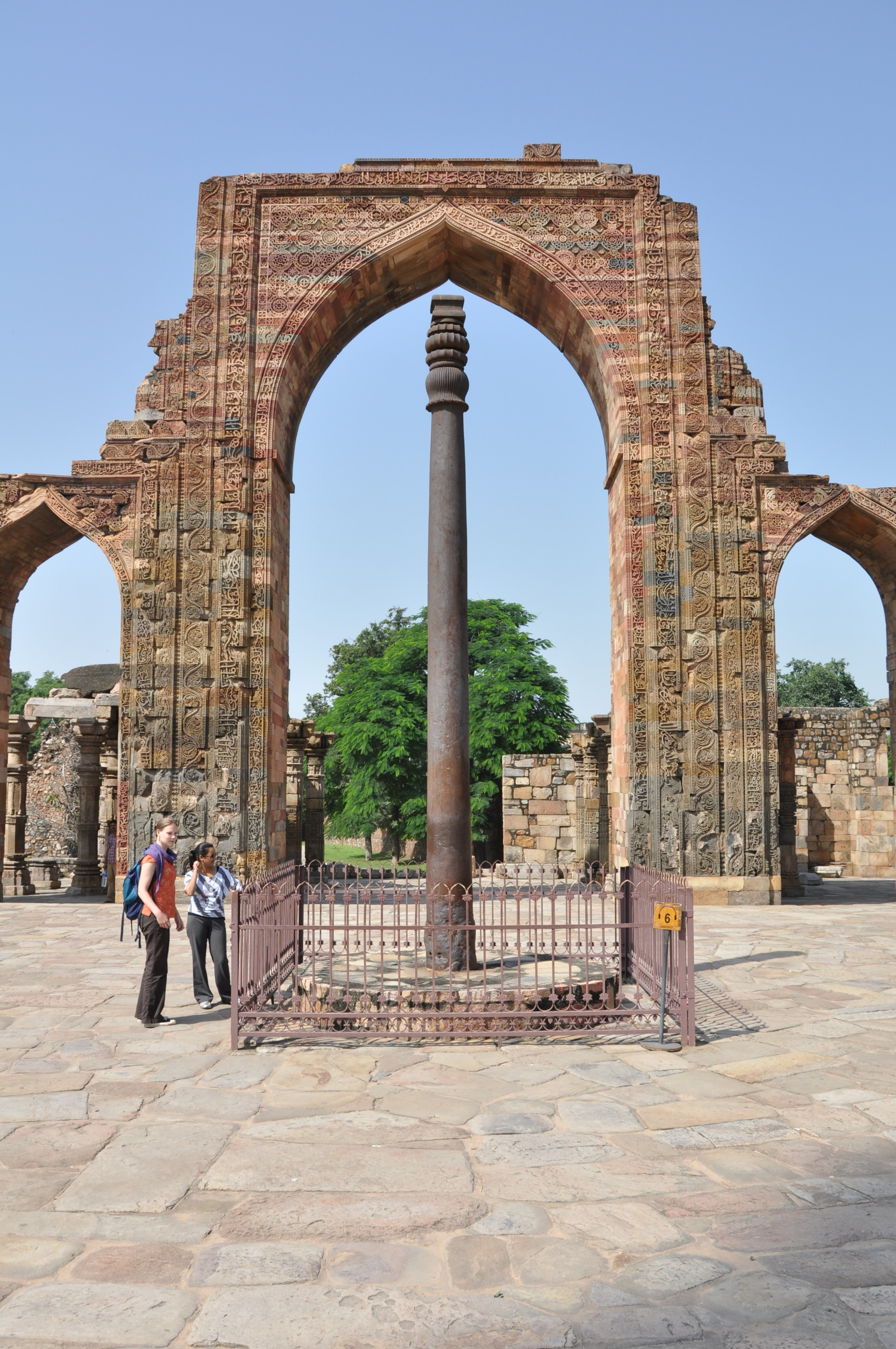
The 4th-century CE 99.7% pure Iron pillar in Delhi reflecting the metal-related shilpa in ancient India. The pillar was moved and reinstalled near Qutb complex about 1000 years later. The upper part of the pillar remains without any rust damage; the lower, reinstalled in-ground part shows signs of rust.

The Vedas, particularly Atharva veda and Sthapatya veda, describe many kinds of arts and crafts in their discussion of Shilpa Shastra and Yantra Sarvasva. The Rig veda, states Ravi, mentions equipment used in casting, such as dhamatri (cupola), gharma aranmaya (crucible) and bhastri (blower). These discussions are in the context of making idols, and describe rules to achieve the best talmana (proportions), mudra (stance) and bhava (expression).

Sanskrit texts such as Shilparatna and Manasara describe in detail the process and principles for art work with metals, particularly for alloys such as panchadhatu (five metals – zinc, tin, copper, silver and gold) and ashtadhatu (eight metal alloys – which adds iron, lead and mercury to panchadhatu). Madhuchista Vidhana (cire perdue or lost wax) casting process is the most discussed process in these ancient shilpa shastras with metals. Kirk suggests that these Shastras diffused from India to other ancient cultures in Asia.

While there is empirical evidence of high purity metallurgy and art works with other metals, some ancient Shilpa Shastras have been lost. For example, the 5th century Iron Pillar of Delhi, which stands 23 feet, weighs 6 tonnes and contains 99.72% iron without showing any signs of rust, is empirical evidence of the state of metallurgical arts in 5th-century India.

== Shilpa Shastra education in ancient India ==
No barriers

Arts were the domain of all classes and genders in ancient India. The ancient texts of Parashara state that all crafts were practised by anyone irrespective of their family's occupation. The Buddhist Jatakas mention Brahmana carpenters, the 4th-century text Baudhayana describes chariot builders, carpenters, brick-workers, potters and metal workers from people classified as Kshatriya, Vaishya and Shudra. Suttavibhanga describes builders and wheelwrights born to Shudra fathers and Brahmana mothers. The goldsmiths of Maharashtra included children born in cattle-herding families. There is no particular community in Assam Valley that is exclusive to traditional crafts such as bamboo and cane. Present day, it is done by particularly the peasants irrespective of caste, community or creed.

Apprenticeship

Apprentices joined and trained under masters. The best were adopted and recognised as members of various art guilds. The training began from childhood, and included studies about dharma, culture, reading, writing, mathematics, geometry, colors, tools, as well as trade secrets – these were called Tradition.

Guilds

Shilpins had formed śreṇi (guilds) in ancient India. Each guild formed its own laws and code of conduct, one the ancient Hindu and Buddhist kings of India respected by tradition. In some cases, the king established the laws of the guilds; in some cases, the king's treasurer had the final word and served as judge of various guilds in a kingdom. These guilds, in the 1st millennium BC, included all those who practised the art irrespective of the artist's caste or creed. The income of each guild came from fees paid by new members joining the guild, from fines on those violating the code of conduct established by the guild, and levies on tools used for that art. The guilds also performed charity and gifted collective works of art by their members to temples and other social works. During festivals and social celebrations, each guild would contribute their own performance and pavilions with flags and emblems.

Art is spiritual

Creative work and artists were granted the sanctions of a sacrament in ancient Indian culture, states Stella Kramrisch. An artist expresses the spiritual and holiness in his or her art. This belief continues to manifest itself in modern India in the form of rituals, where in an autumn festival (Dashahra), craftsmen in parts of India worship their tools with incense, flowers and unhusked rice.

Brhat Samhita at verses 57.10-11 describes the practice of carpenters offering prayers and seeking forgiveness of a tree before cutting it for wood. The axe used to cut the tree would be rubbed with honey and butter to minimise the hurt to the tree, which was considered a living being. Craft was seen as application of essence of Purusha (Universal Principles) to parts of nature so as to transform it into a work of art.

== Treatises on Shilpa Shastras ==
Some known Shilpa Shastras-related manuscripts include:

- Mayashastra (image printing, wall decoration)
- Bimbamana (painting)
- Shukra-Niti (pratima – murti or vigraha making, icon design)
- Suprabhedagama
- Vishnu dharmottara purana (literature, music, theatre, dance, painting, sculpture, iconography, architecture)
- Agamas (have chapters on other shilpa shastras)
- Agni purana (iconography)
- Brahmanda purana (mostly architecture, some sections on arts)
- Vastu vidya
- Pratima lakshana vidhanam
- Gargeyam
- Manasara (many chapters on casting, moulding carving, polishing and making of arts and crafts)
- Atriyam
- Pratima mana lakshanam (includes chapters on repair of broken idols and art works)
- Dasa tala nyagrodha pari mandala
- Sambudhabhasita pratima lakshana vivarana nama
- Mayamatam (construction – architecture, vehicles, etc.)
- Brhat Samhita
- Shilpa ratnam (Purvabhaga book has 46 chapters on arts and construction of house/towns, Uttarabhaga has 35 chapters on sculpture, icons and related topics of smaller scale)
- Yukti kalpataru (various arts, including jewelry)
- Shilpa kala darsanam
- Samarangana Sutradhara
- Vishva karma prakasam
- Matsya purana
- Garuda purana
- Kashyapa shilpashastra
- Bhavishya purana (mostly architecture, some sections on arts)
- Alankara shastra
- Artha shastra (general crafts such as windows and doors, as well as public utilities)
- Chitra kalpa (ornaments)
- Chitra karmashastra
- Maya shilpashastra (in Tamil)
- Vishvakarma shilpa (arts on columns, wood working)
- Agastya (wood based arts and crafts)
- Mandana Shilpa Shastra (diya, lamps related crafts)
- Ratna shastra (pearls, string, jewelry crafts)
- Ratna pariksha (jewelry)
- Ratna samgraha (jewelry)
- Laghu ratna pariksha (jewelry, lapidary)
- Manimahatmya (lapidary)
- Agastimata (lapidary crafts)
- Anangaranga (erotic arts)
- Kamasutra (artistic activities)
- Rati rahasya (erotic arts)
- Kandarpa chudamani (erotic arts)
- Natya shastra (theatre, dance, music, fragments on painting and sculpture)
- Nrttaratnavali (crafts for fashion and public performance)
- Sangita ratna kara (crafts for fashion, dance and public performance)
- Nalapaka (food, utensils, and culinary crafts)
- Paka darpana (food, utensils, and culinary crafts)
- Paka vijnana (food, utensils, and culinary crafts)
- Pakarnava (food, utensils, and culinary crafts)
- Kuttanimatam (textile arts)
- Kadambari by Banabhatta (chapters on textile art and crafts)
- Samaymatrka (textile arts)
- Yantra Kosha (musical instruments, Overview in Bengali Language)
- Sangita ratna kara (music crafts)
- Śilpa-ratna-kośa (architecture, sculpture)
- Cilappatikaaram (a 2nd-century Tamil classic on music and dance, sections on musical instruments)
- Manasollasa (arts and crafts relating to musical instruments, cooking, textiles, decoration)
- Vastuvidya (sculpture, icons, painting, and minor arts and crafts)
- Upavana vinoda (Sanskrit treatise on arbori-horticulture arts, garden house design, aspects of house plants related crafts)
- Vastusutra Upanishad (oldest known Sanskrit Shilpa Shastra text, 6 chapters, deals with image making, describes how image arts are means of communicating emotions and spiritual freedom).

== See also ==
- Artistic canons of body proportions#Classical India – Criteria used in formal figurative art
- Hindu iconography – Iconic symbols with spiritual meaning in Hinduism
- Hindu temple – Place of worship in Hinduism
- Murti – Religious image in Hinduism
- Talamana – Traditional system of Indian iconometry
- Vastu shastra – Indian architecture and design-related texts
- Vishvakarma – Divine architect of the Hindu gods
