= Bumpa =

Ritual vase with a spout used in Tibetan Buddhist rituals

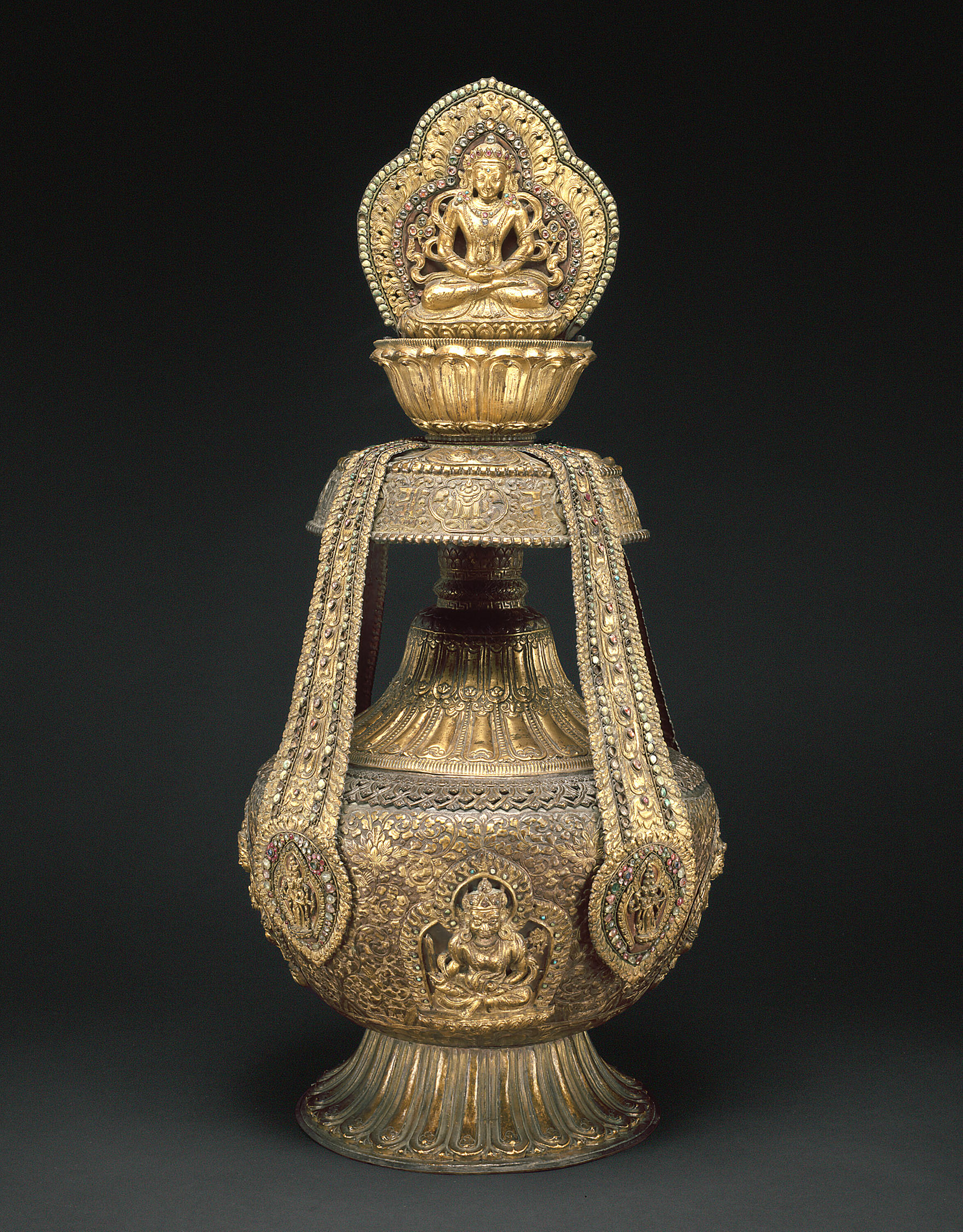
Gilt bumpa with image of Buddha Amitābha. Nepal, 17th century.

The bumpa' (Standard Tibetan: བུམ་པ་), or pumpa, is a ritual ewer or vase with a spout used in Tibetan Buddhist rituals and empowerment. It is believed in some contexts to be the vessel for the expanse of the universe.

There are two kinds of bumpa: the tso bum, or main vase, and the le bum or activity vase. The main vase is usually placed in the center of the mandala, and the activity vase is placed on the Lama's table and is used by the Chöpön, or ritual specialist, during rituals and empowerments.

The bumpa empowerment is the main ritual empowerment activity in Kriyayoga Tantra.

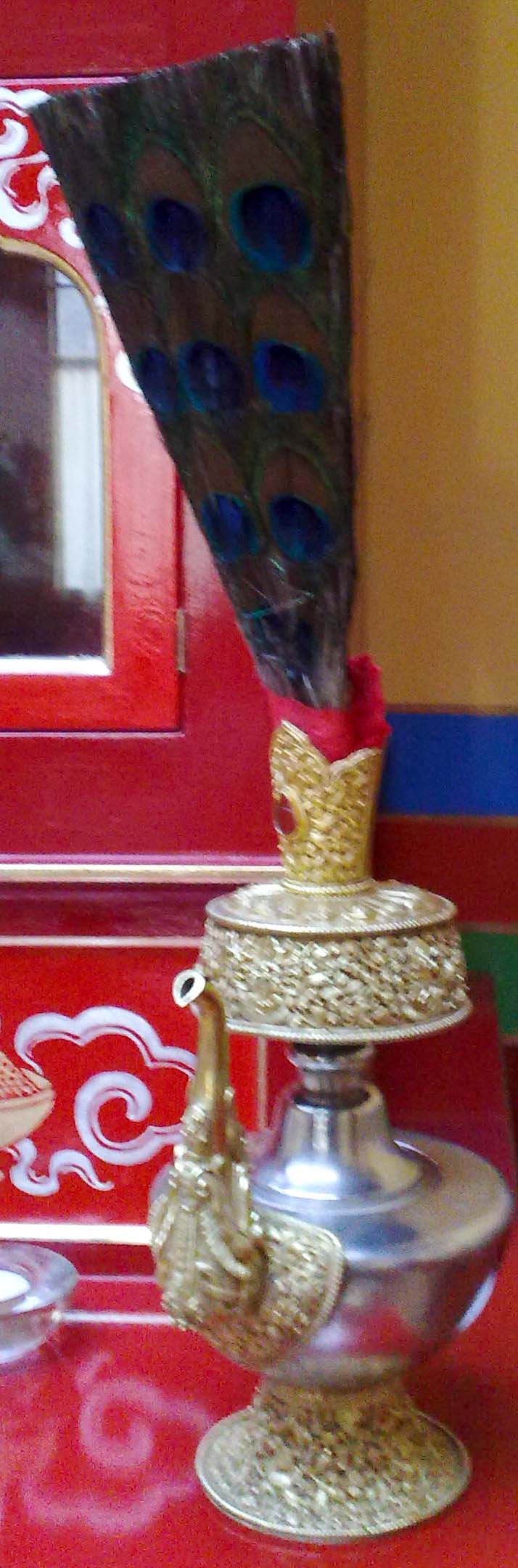

== See also ==
- Kumbha
- Kalasha
