= Kumbha =

Type of pottery in India

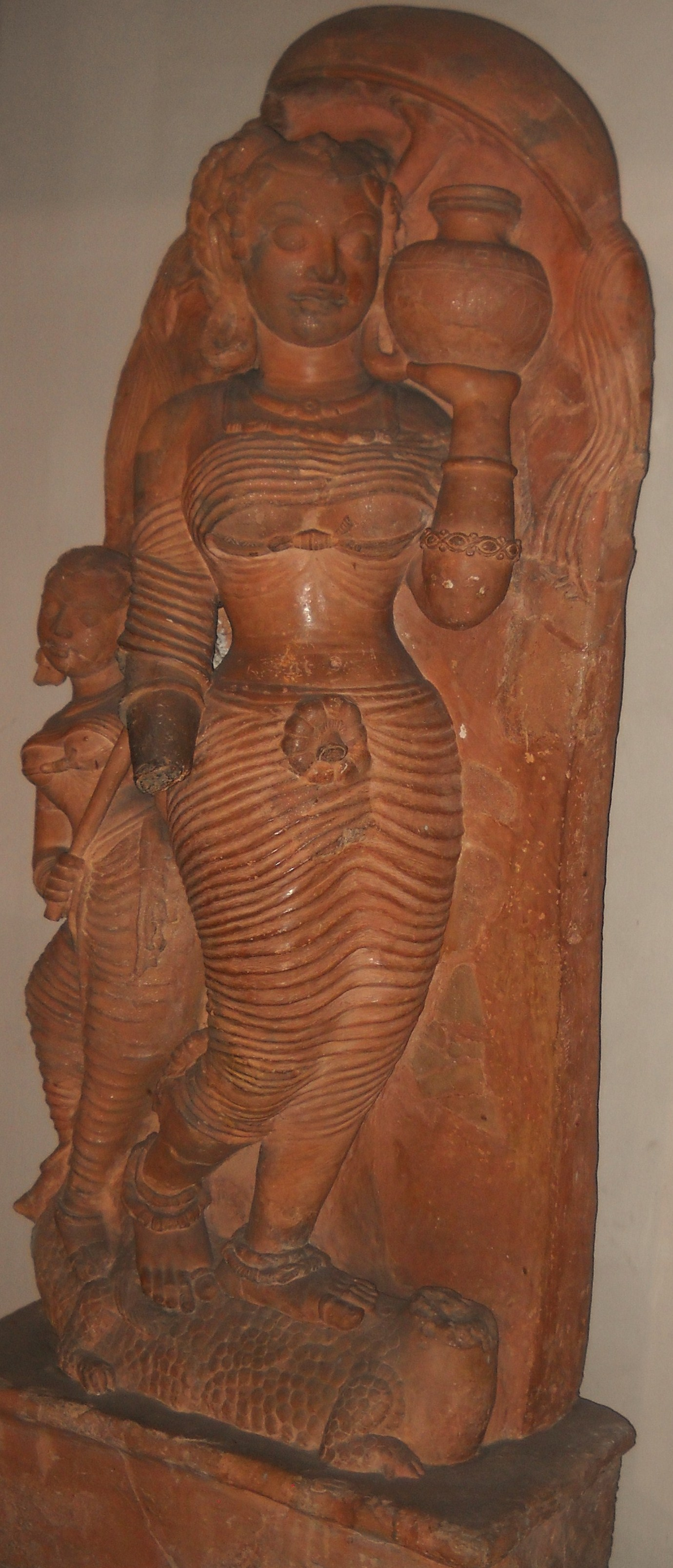
- The goddess Ganga shown with a kumbha (a full vase)

A kumbha (Sanskrit: कुम्भ) is a traditional Indian earthenware pot or pitcher. It is produced by the Kumbhars (potter) community, who also identify as Prajapatis.

In Hindu, Jain and Buddhist tradition, the vessel symbolizes the womb and fertility. Iconographically, it is depicted as an attribute of fertility deities and river goddesses, notably Ganga.

== Mythological origin ==
According to one Hindu mythological tradition, the first kumbha was created by Prajapati for the marriage of Shiva, making him the first kumbhāra (potter). A related narrative attributes the creation of the first vessel to Vishvakarma, who created it to contain the Amrita (nectar of immortality) produced during the Samudra Manthana (churning of the ocean).

Several figures in Hindu literature are recorded as having been born from a vessel, earning the epithet kumbhayoni (pot-born). The sages Agastya and Vasishtha are traditionally described as originating from a kumbha in the Rigveda.

Raw Kumbh made by Hans Raj Prajapati in Punjab : May 2010

In Hindu domestic and temple rites, ritual pots termed as kalashas or pūna-kumbhas—filled with water, topped with mango leaves and a coconut, and decorated with intricate motifs—function as embodiments of auspiciousness and deity presence.

== Astrology and other uses ==
In Hindu astrology (Jyotisha), the kumbha corresponds to the zodiac sign Aquarius traditionally associated with the planetary ruler Saturn (Shani). The sign gives its name to the Kumbha Mela, which takes place during specific astronomical alignments when Jupiter (Brihaspati) transits through Aquarius.

In Hindu epic Ramayana, Ravana's brother Kumbhakarna had a son named Kumbha, who was killed in battle by Sugriva.

The term also occurs as an occupational surname among certain regional groups, such as the Yerukala community in Andhra Pradesh.

== See also ==
- Kumbha rashi, name of zodiac sign Aquarius in sanskrit
- Kumbha Mela
- Kalasha
- Matki (earthen pot)
- Bumpa, a Tibetan Buddhist pot
