= Jain flag =

Flag for Jainism

Jainism
- Use: Jain symbol
- Proportion: 2:3

The official flag of Jainism has five colours: White, Red, Yellow, Green and Blue. These five colours represent the Pañca-Parameṣṭhi (five supreme beings). It also represents the five main vows of Jainism.

== Colours ==
These five colours represent the "Pañca-Parameṣṭhi" and the five vows, small as well as great:

- White – represents the arihants, souls who have conquered all passions (anger, attachments, aversion) and have attained omniscience and eternal bliss through self-realization. It also denotes peace or ahimsa (non-violence).
- Red – represents the siddha, souls that have attained salvation and truth. It also denotes truthfulness (satya).
- Yellow – represents the acharya the Masters of Adepts. The colour also stands for non-stealing (achaurya).
- Green – represents the upadhyaya (adepts), those who teach scriptures to monks. It also signifies chastity (brahmacharya).
- Blue – represents the sadhus and sadhvis or monks and nuns. It also signifies non-possession (aparigraha).

It is also believed that the complexion of all the 24 Tirthankaras was of one of these five colours. For instance, Chandraprabha and Pushpadanta were white, Munisuvrata and Neminatha were dark colour, Padmaprabha and Vasupujya were red, Suparshvanatha and Parshvanatha were green, while the remaining were golden or yellowish.

== Swastika ==
The swastika in the centre of the flag represents the four states of existence of soul. These four states may be:

- heaven-beings or deities
- human beings
- animals, birds, insects or plants
- hell beings

It represents that the soul can embody any of these forms, owing to karma, which may escalate it to higher-level forms such as heavenly beings, or degrade it to lower-level forms such as lesser animals or hell beings.
The purpose of the soul is to liberate itself from these four stages and be arihants or Siddha eventually.

== Three dots ==
The three dots above the swastika represent the Ratnatraya (three jewels) of Jainism:

- Samyak Darshana – "Right Faith" or "Right Vision"
- Samyak Gyana – "Right Knowledge"
- Samyak Charitra – "Right Conduct"

These are part of the Jainist paradigm by which jīva (living souls) seek to rid themselves of karma and the cycle of rebirth, saṃsāra, which it develops.

== Siddhashila ==
The curve above the three dots denotes Siddhashila, a place in the highest realms of Universe, composed of pure energy. It is above hell, earth, or heaven. It is the place where souls that have attained salvation, for instance, Arihants and Siddhas reside eternally with supreme bliss.

Respect for Jain Flag is respect for Pañca-Parameṣṭhi (Supreme Five). According to Jainism, respect for Pañca-Parameṣṭhi abiding the Ratnatraya (Three Jewels) destroys the sorrow of the four states of existence and finally guides one to the sweet home of infinite bliss (Siddhashila).

== Photo gallery ==
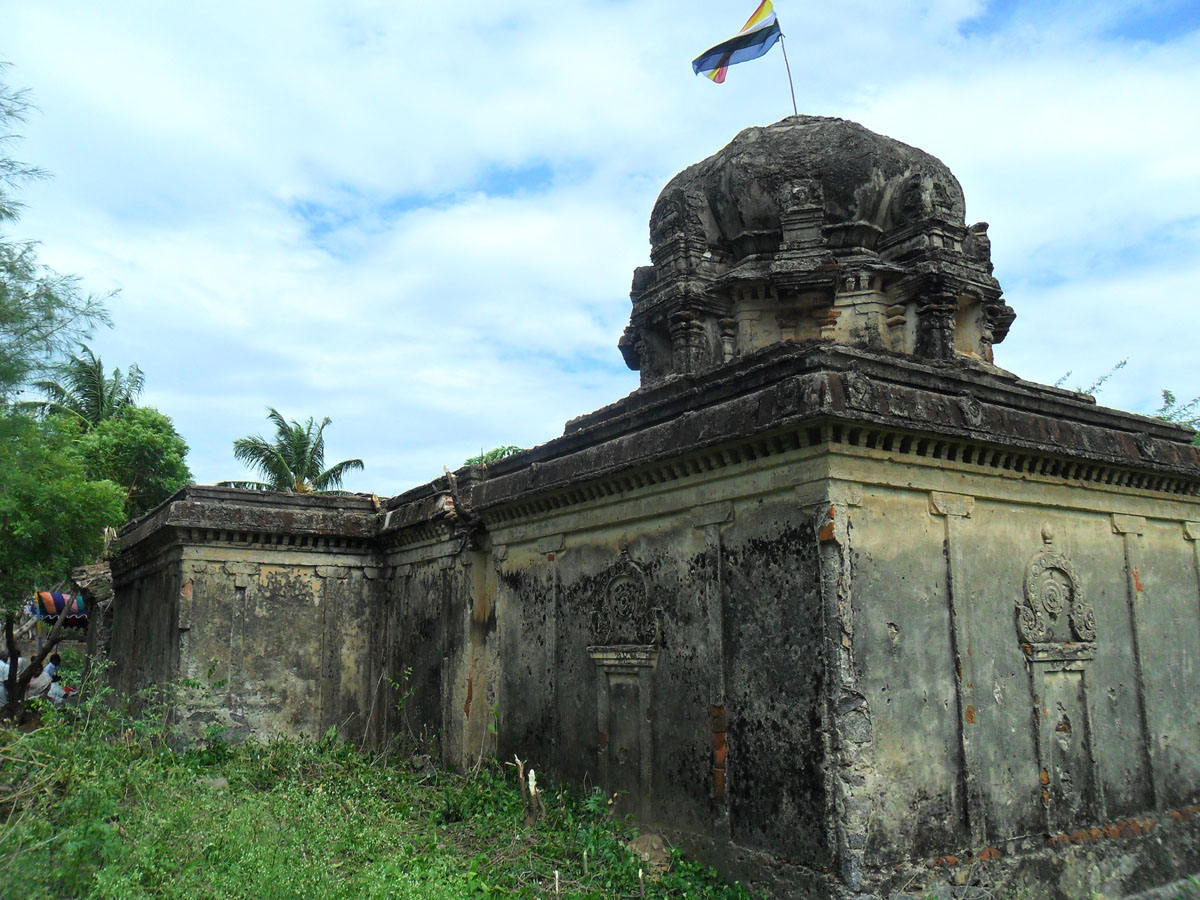
Flag atop the Gingee Jain temple, Gingee, Villupuram district, Tamil Nadu, India

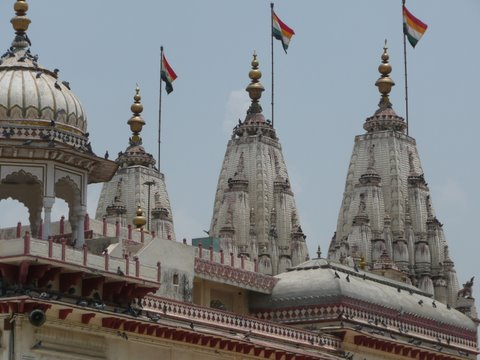
Flag atop the Shri Mahavirji temple, Rajasthan, India

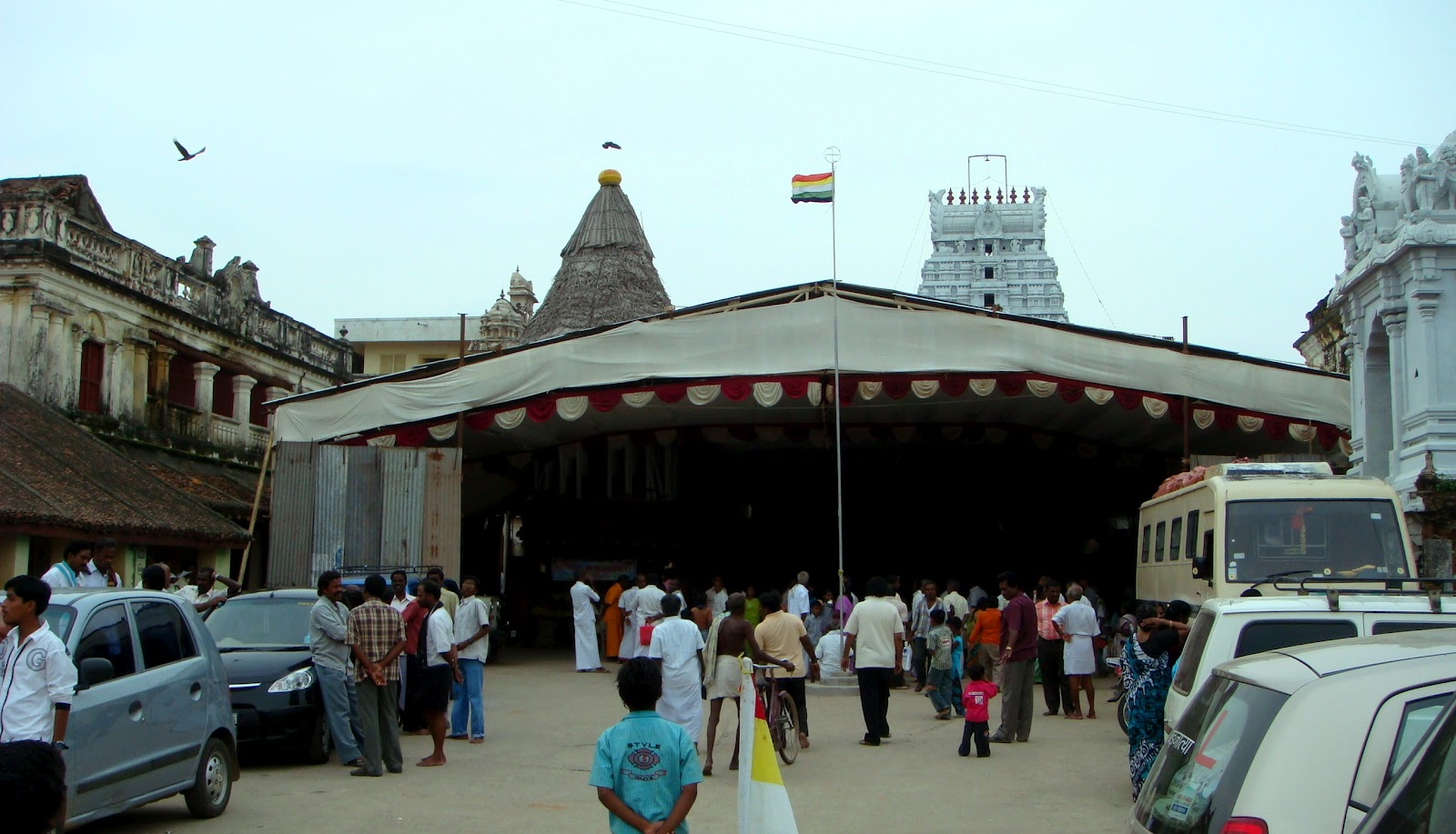
Flag in front of the Mel Sithamur Jain Muth, Gingee, Villupuram district, Tamil Nadu, India

== See also ==
- Jain related
  - Jain symbols
  - Jain rituals
- Flags of other Indian-origin religions
  - Bhagwa Dhwaj, Hindu Maratha
  - Buddhist flag
  - Dhvaja, Hindu
  - Nishan Sahib, Sikh flag
