= Jain symbols =

Symbols pertaining to Jainism

Compilation of Jainism iconography

Jain symbols are symbols associated with Jainism, a Dharmic religion originating in India.

== Swastika ==
The four arms of the swastika symbolize the four states of existence per Jainism:

1. Heavenly beings ("devas encantadia")
2. Human beings
3. Hellish beings
4. Tiryancha (subhuman like flora or fauna)

It represents the perpetual nature of the universe in the material world, where a creature is destined to one of those states based on their karma. In contrast to this circle of rebirth and delusion is the concept of a straight path, constituted by correct faith, understanding and conduct, and visually symbolized by the three dots above the swastika, which leads the individual out of the transient imperfect world to a permanent perfect state of enlightenment and perfection. This perfect state of liberation is symbolized by the crescent and dot at the top of the swastika.

The swastika also represents the four characteristics of the soul: infinite knowledge, infinite perception, infinite happiness, and infinite energy, as well as the four columns of the Jain Sangha: sadhus, sadhvis, sravakas and shravikas - monks, nuns and female and male laymen.

This symbol was "officially" made a symbol of the Jain community on the 2500-year anniversary of Bhagwan Mahaveer's attainment of mukti.

== Symbol of Ahimsa ==
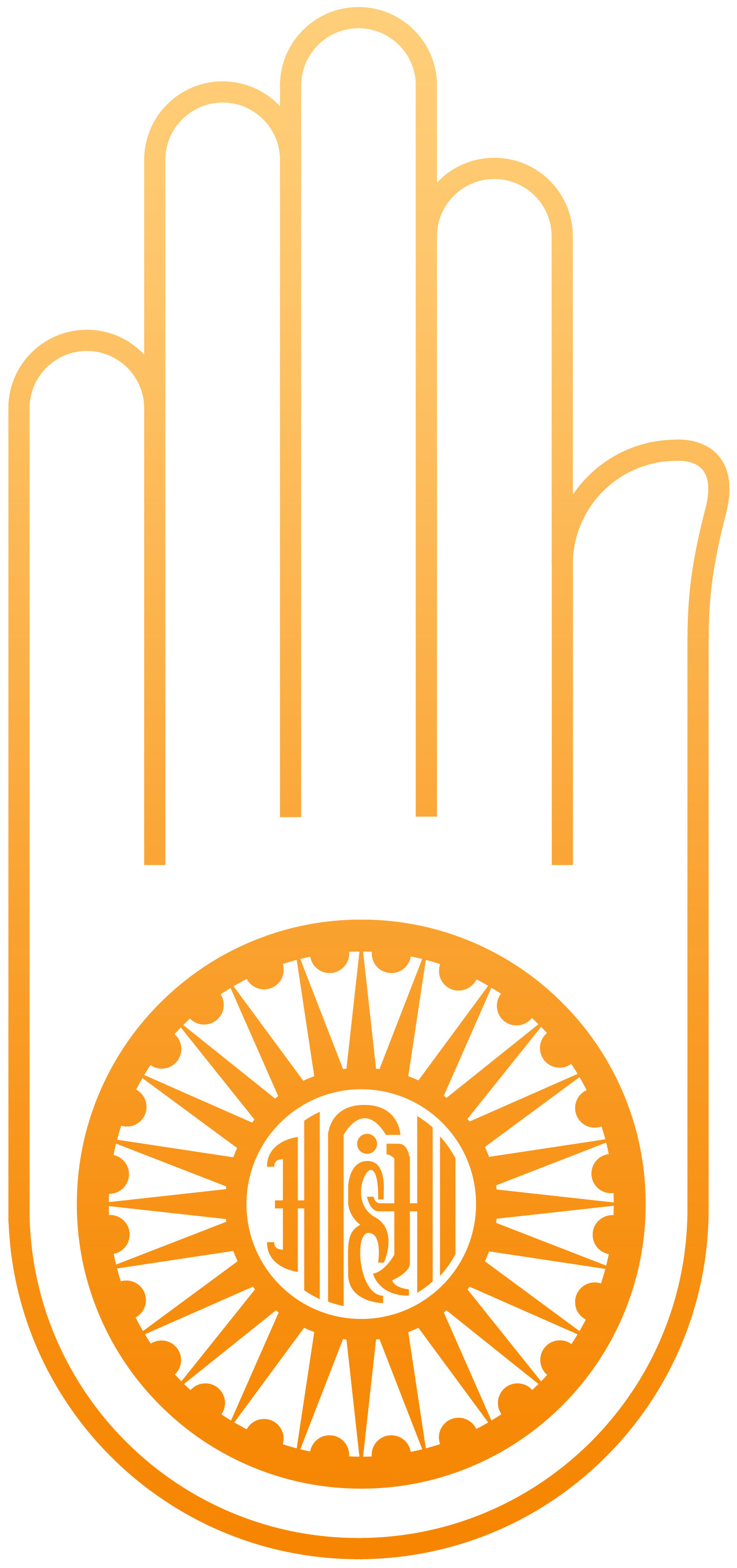
The symbol of Ahimsa in Jainism

The hand with a wheel on the palm symbolizes Ahimsa in Jainism. The word in the middle is "ahiṃsā" (non-violence). The wheel represents the dharmachakra, which stands for the resolve to halt saṃsāra through the relentless pursuit of Ahimsa.

== Jain emblem ==
In 1975, on the auspicious 2500th anniversary of the nirvana of the last Jain Tirthankara, Mahavira, the Jain community at large collectively chose one image as an emblem to be the main identifying symbol for Jainism. Since then, this emblem is used in almost all of Jain magazines, on wedding cards, on Jain festival cards and in magazines with links to events related to Jain society.

=== Fundamental concepts ===
The Jain emblem is composed of many fundamental concepts and symbols. The outline of the image represents the universe as described in Jain Agamas. It consists of three Loks (realms). The upper portion indicates heaven, the middle portion indicates the material world and the lower portion indicates hell.

The semi-circular topmost portion symbolizes siddhashila, which is a zone beyond the three realms. All of the siddhas or liberated bodiless creatures/souls reside on this forever, liberated from the cycle of life and death. The three dots on the top under the semi-circle symbolize the Ratnatraya – right belief, right knowledge, and right conduct. Every creature in this world can become free from the cycle of life and death. This gives the message that it is necessary to have the Ratnatraya in order to attain moksha.

In the top portion, the swastika symbol is present.

The symbol of hand in the lower portion shows fearlessness and symbolizes the feeling of ahimsa towards all the creatures in this world. The circle in the middle of the hand symbolizes saṃsāra and the 24 spokes represent the preachings from the 24 Tirthankaras, which can be used to liberate a soul from the cycle of reincarnation.

The meaning of the mantra at the bottom, Parasparopagraho Jivanam, is "All life is bound together by mutual support and interdependence."

In short, the Jain emblem represents many important concepts to show the path to enlightenment by following the basic principles of ahimsa, the Ratnatraya and Parasparopagraho Jivanam.

=== Usage ===
It is important that an emblem or symbol is used consistently in the same format to preserve its value and the meaning. There are many variations of the symbol in use currently. However, they do not show all the fundamental concepts embedded in the current emblem. For example, JAINA in North America uses a modified version of the standard Jain symbol. It replaces the swastika with Aum because the swastika is associated with Nazi Germany there.

== Jain flag ==
Jain flag

The five colours of the Jain flag represent the Pañca-Parameṣṭhi and the five vows, small as well as great:

- White – represents the arihants, souls who have conquered all passions (anger, attachments, aversion) and have attained omniscience and eternal bliss through self-realisation. It also denotes peace or ahiṃsā (non-violence ).
- Red – represents the Siddha, souls that have attained salvation and truth. It also denotes satya (truthfulness)
- Yellow – represents the acharya the Masters of Adepts. The colour also stands for achaurva (non-stealing).
- Green – represents the upadhyaya (adepts), those who teach scriptures to monks. It also signifies brahmacharya (chastity).
- Dark blue – represents the Jain ascetics. It also signifies aparigraha (non-possession).

== Om ==
Om in Jainism

In Jainism, Om, also spelled Aum is considered a condensed form of reference to the Pañca-Parameṣṭhi, by their initials A+A+A+U+M (o3m). The Dravyasamgraha quotes a Prakrit line:

oma ekākṣara pañca-parameṣṭhi-nāmā-dipam tatkathamiti cheta "arihatā asarīrā āyariyā taha uvajjhāyā muṇiyā"

AAAUM (or just "Aum") is one syllable short form of the initials of the five parameshthis: "Arihant, Asharira, Acharya, Upajjhaya, Muni".

The Om/Aum symbol is used in ancient Jain scriptures to represent the Navakar Mantra, which is the most important prayer in the Jain religion. The Navakar Mantra honors the panch parmeshtis (or five supreme beings) in Jainism.

== Ashtamangala ==
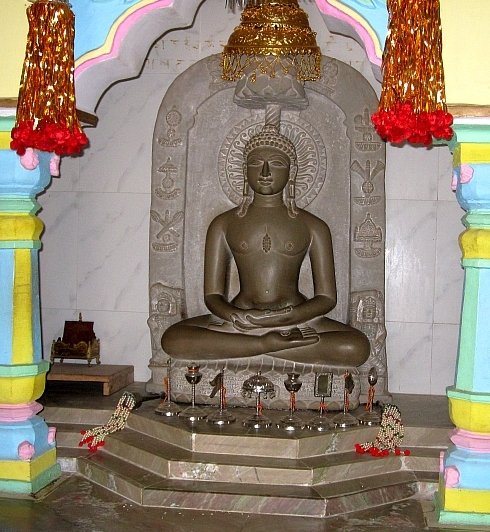
Adinath image with Ashtamangala, according to Digambara tradition

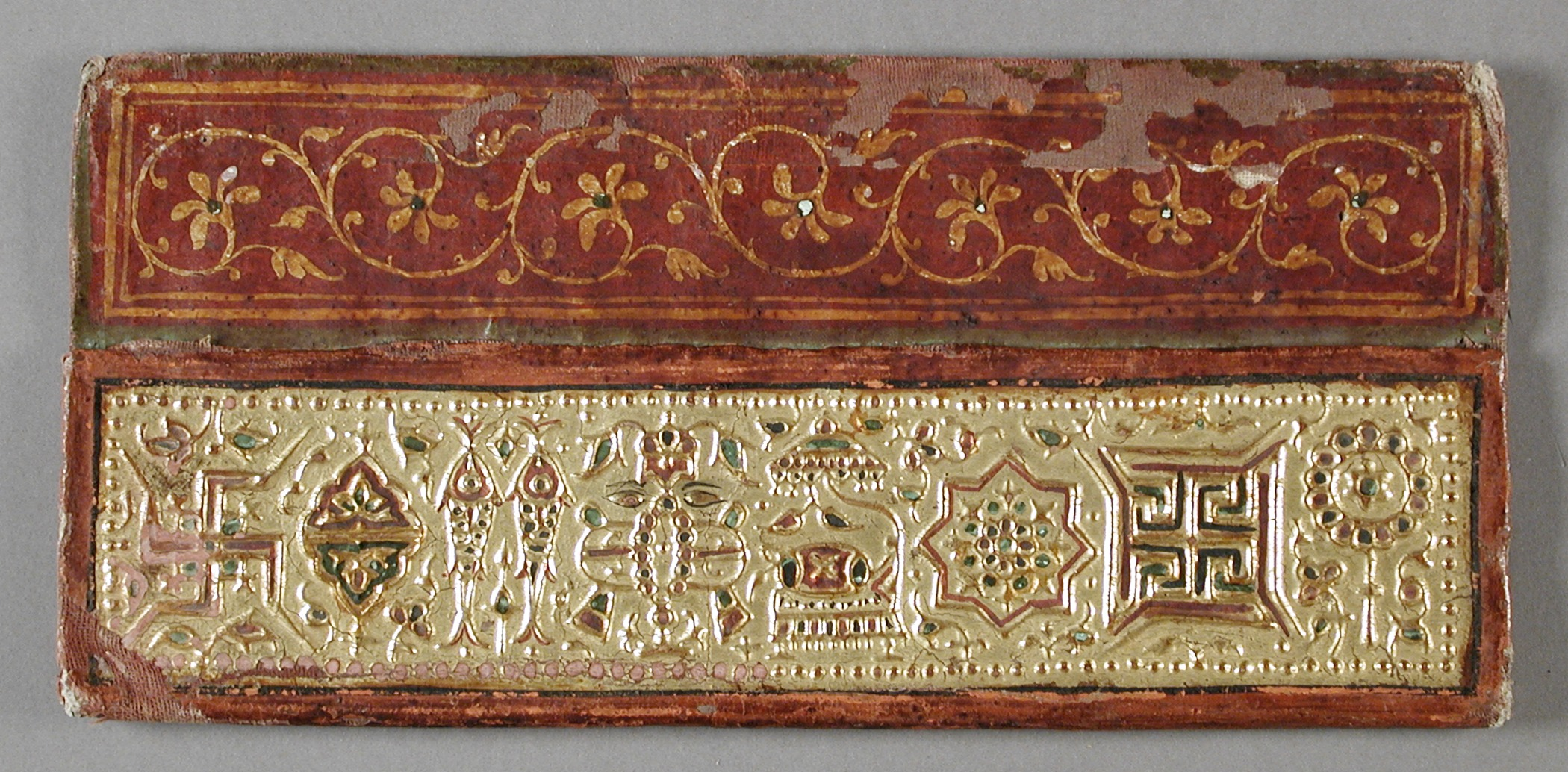
Ashtamangala, according to Svetambara tradition, on Jain manuscript cover, LACMA (from left) : Swastika, Vardhmanaka, Pair of fish, Kalasha, Bhadrasana, Srivatsa, Nandavarta, Darpan

The Ashtamangala are a set of eight auspicious symbols. There is some variation among different traditions concerning the eight symbols.

In the Digambara tradition, the eight symbols are:

1. Parasol
2. Dhvaja
3. Kalasha
4. Fly-whisk
5. Mirror
6. Chair
7. Hand fan
8. Vessel

In the Śvētāmbara tradition, the eight symbols are:

1. Swastika
2. Srivatsa
3. Nandavarta
4. Vardhmanaka (food vessel)
5. Bhadrasana (seat)
6. Kalasha (pot)
7. Darpana (mirror)
8. Pair of fish

== Photo gallery ==
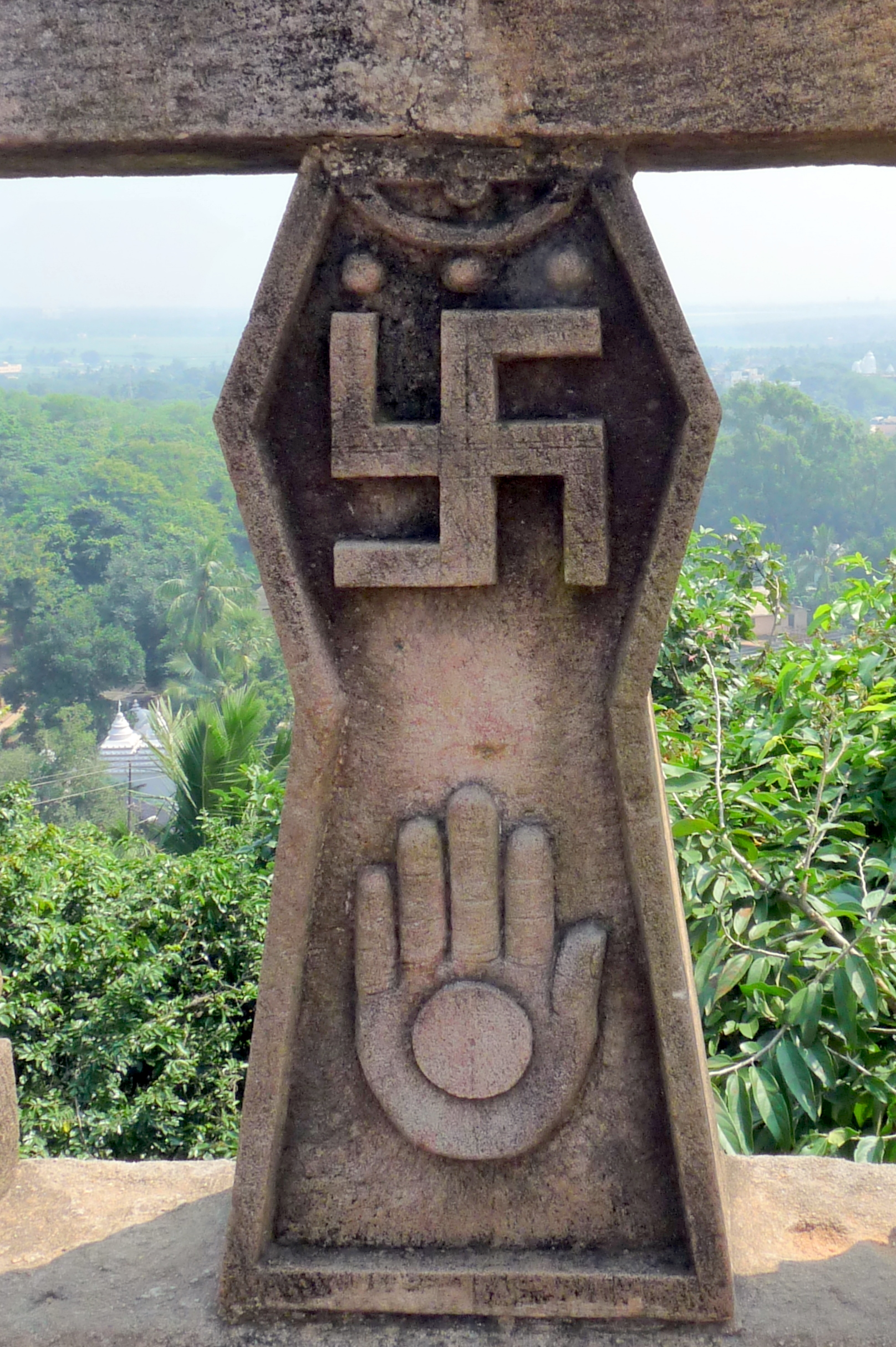
Symbol usage at the Udayagiri and Khandagiri Caves, Odisha, India

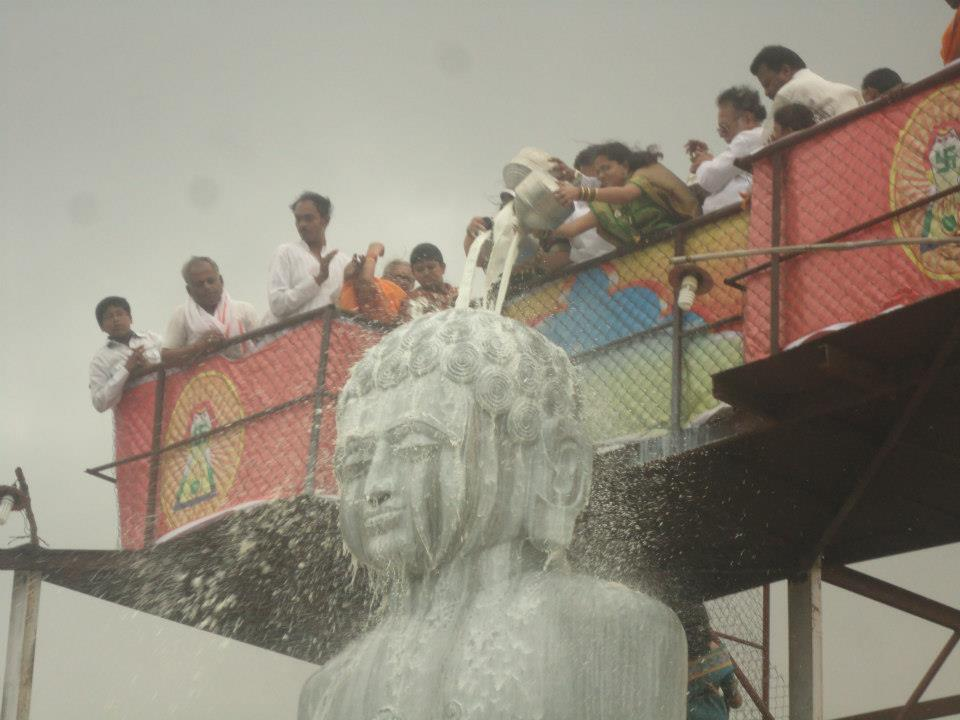
Symbol usage behind the statue at Shantinath Jain Teerth, Pune, Maharashtra, India

Jain Swastika

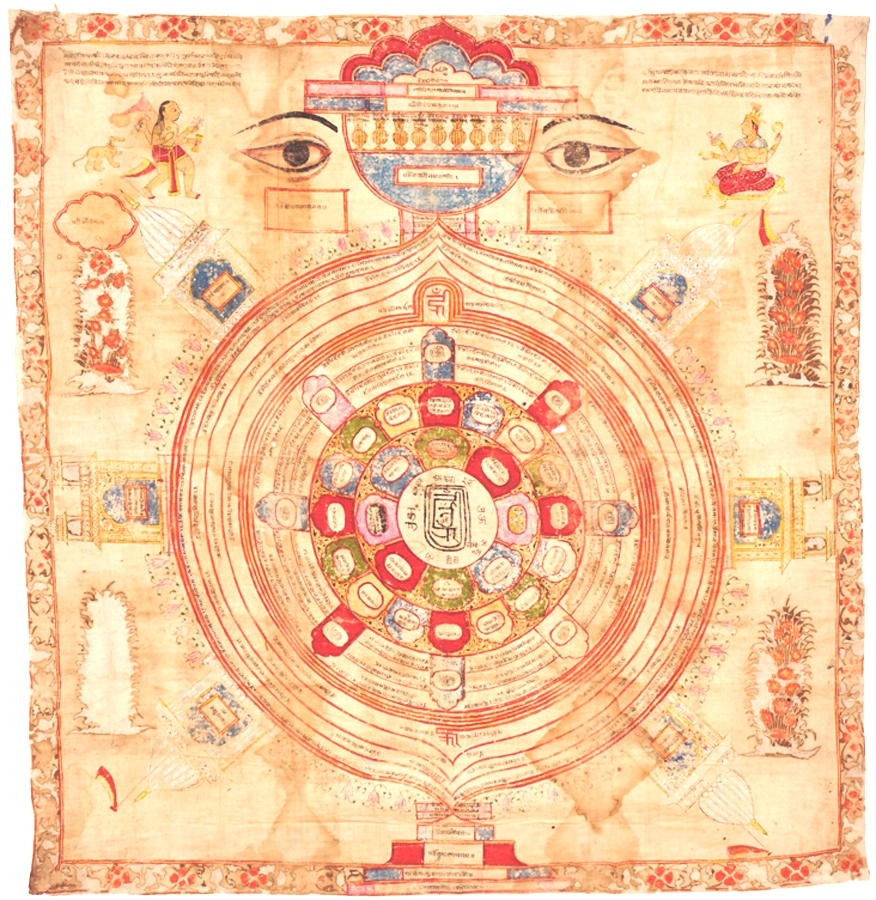
Siddhachakra

== See also ==
- Jain temple
