= Siddhachakra =

Mystical diagram used for worship in Jainism

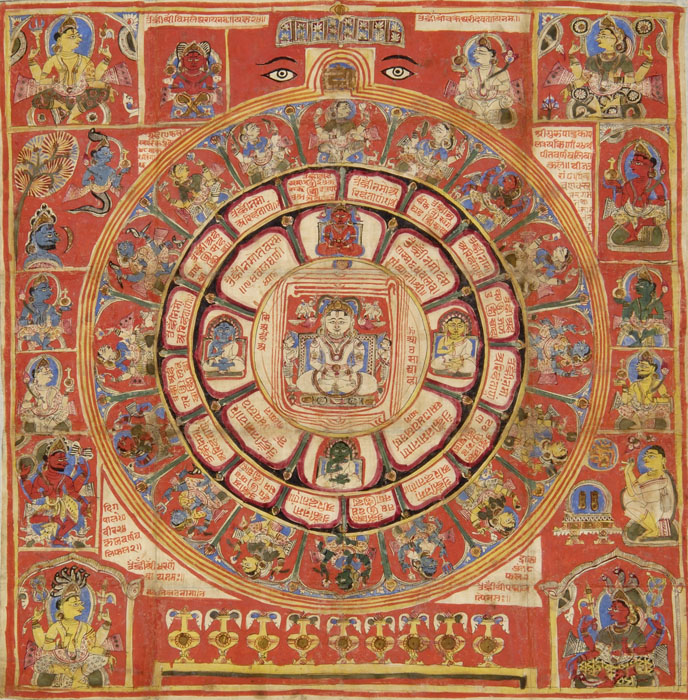
Siddhacakra from Gujarat, India, c. 1500

Siddhachakra is a popular yantra or mandala (mystical diagram) used for worship in Jainism. It is also known as Navapada in the Śvetāmbara tradition and Navadevta in the Digambara tradition. In the Śvetāmbara tradition it is associated with the Namokar Mantra. It is related to the legend of King Shripala and his wife Mayanasundari. It is depicted as a Kalasha with the core of a blossomed lotus representing Navapada in the centre surrounded by guarding deities on petals. It is used in some rituals.

== Etymology ==
Siddha refers to a liberated soul, while chakra means wheel. It is believed that worshiping Siddhachakra results in freedom from the cycles of life within a universal 'wheel' known as nirvana. It also means a 'circle of perfection'. Navapada means 'nine petals' in reference to the centre of the yantra, while Navadevta means 'nine deities'. It is also described as a 'saint wheel'.

== History ==
The two major sects of Jainism, Śvetāmbara and Digambara, differ in their concept of Siddhachakra. The first five deities, known as the Panch Parmeshthi (five supreme beings) are the same in both traditions while the other four are different. They were traditionally known as Navapada in the Śvetāmbara tradition and Navadevta in the Digambara tradition.

=== Śvetāmbara ===
Siddhachakra most likely originally had only the Panch Parmesthi, Arihant in the center and the other four in petals in four different directions. It may have been inspired from Namaskara Valaya based on the Namokar Mantra as in some older Siddhachakra. The four last lines describing phalashruti (benefits) are depicted in addition to the petals at the four corners. They are described by Acharya Hemachandra in Yogashastra. He also noted that Vajraswami (BCE 57 – 57 CE) derived it from the lost Vidyanupravad parva text.

It seems that the other four padas were added later. Acharya Dinkara (1411 CE) described Navapada in Nandyavrata Mandala. Nirvanakalika (c. 11th century) described it but replaced Tapa with Suchi-vidya.

Ratnamandira Gani or Acharya Ratnashekhara wrote about the legend of Shripal in Siri-Sirivala-Kaha in Prakrit along with Siddhachakra Puja in 1372 or 1362 CE, the earliest known reference. A later popular version called Shripal Rajano Ras was written in 1682 CE by Vinayvijay and Yashovijay.

==== Legend ====
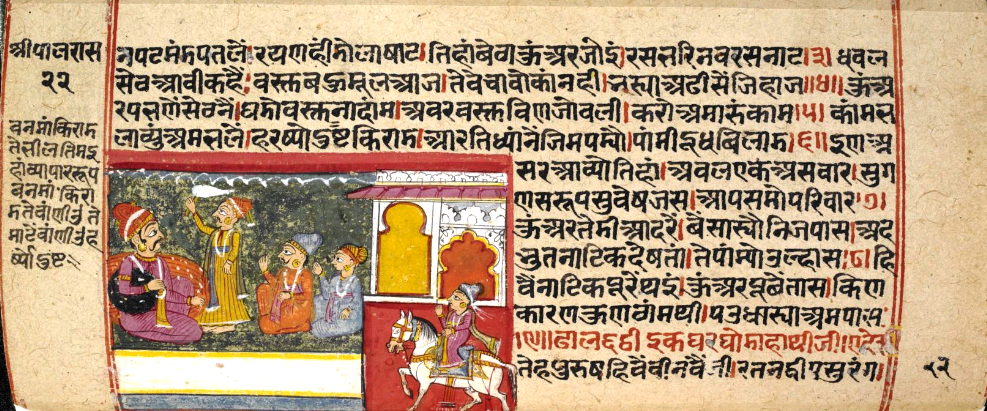
King Shripala in a 17th- or 18th-century manuscript of Shripal Rajano Ras

The legend takes place during the time of the twentieth Jain Tirthankara Munisuvrata, about 1.1 million years ago according to Jain traditions. There was a king named Singharth and a queen Kamalprabha of Champanagar. His brother Ajitsen captured Champanagar when he died. To save five-year-old Shripal from his uncle, Kamalprabha fled from the city and left him with a group of lepers while being chased by soldiers. Shripal was also infected by leprosy. He changed his name to Umar Rana and became the group's leader.

Eventually he reached Ujjain where King Prajapal was ruling. Out of anger from being disrespected by his daughter, Mayanasundari, he married her to the leprous Shripal. They met a Jain monk, Munichandra, who advised them to do a ritual named Ayambil Oli which is dedicated to the central Navpada in Siddhachakra. It cured Shripal's leprosy along with that of 700 other lepers. Later he conquered Ujjain and Champanagar.

=== Digambara ===
Navdevata was depicted as Pratishtha-vidhi-mandala in Pratishtha-tilaka by Nemichandra (c. 15th century). It was also described in Pratishtha-Sirodhara by Ashadhar, Jin-samhita by Indranandi (c. 10th century), and Paratishtha-Kalpa-Tippanam by Kumudchanra.

Jinasamhita by Ekasamdhi (c. 1250 CE) described it in detail, depicting it as similar to Brihad Siddhachakra.

== Types ==
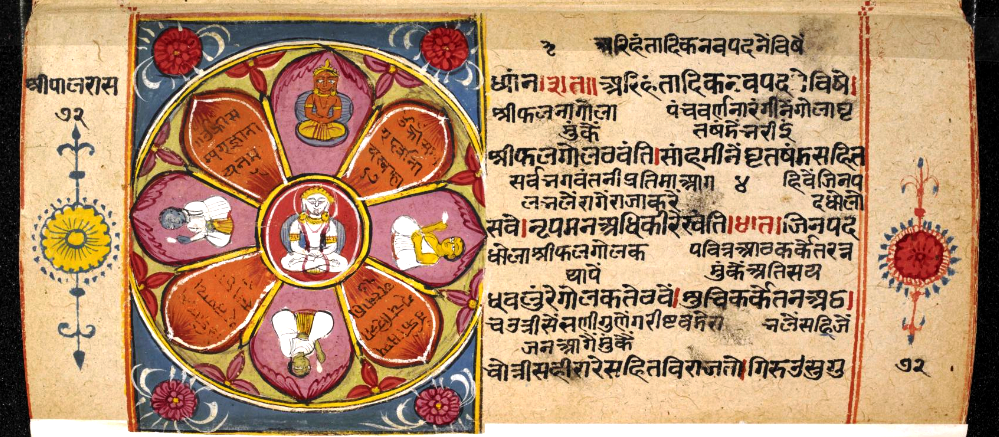
Small Siddhachakra in manuscript of Shripal Rajano Ras dated to the 17th or 18th century

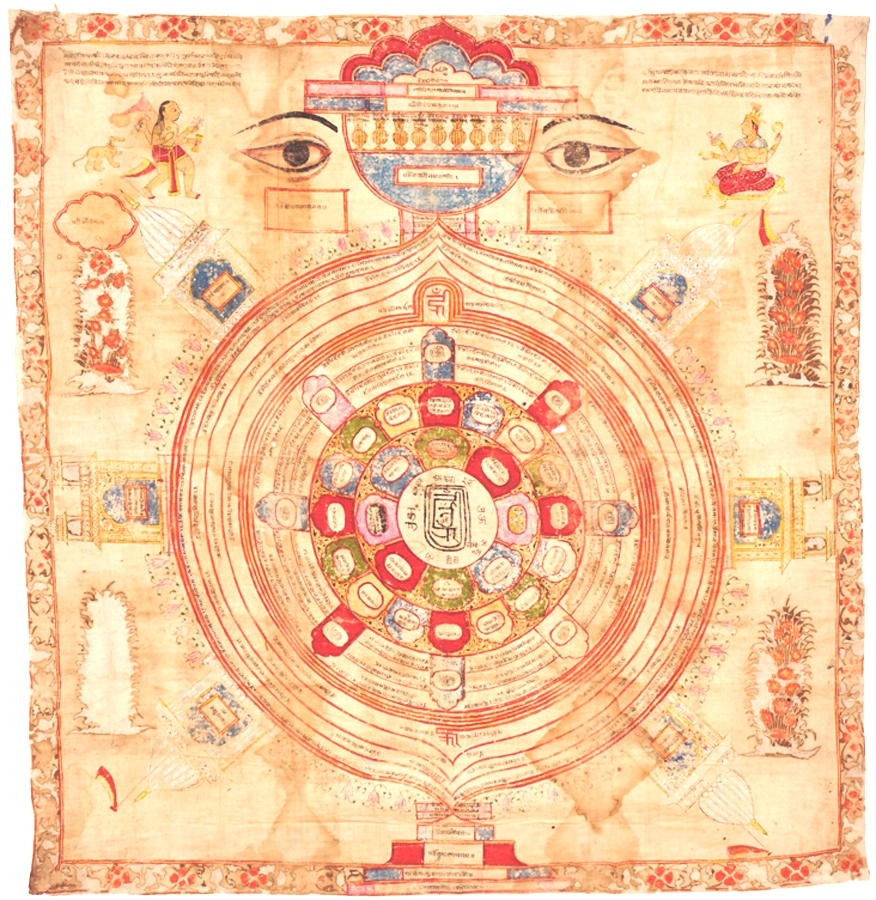
Brihad Siddhachakra (Larger form)

There are two types of Siddhachakra. The small types have only a central part depicting Nav pada which only includes Arihant, Siddha (liberated souls), Acharya (leaders), Upadhyaya (teachers) and Sadhu (monks) along with the other four. Large types includes all of the structures described below called Brihad Siddhachakra or Siddhachakra Mahayantra. Small types are found frequently in Jain temples and in carvings while larger ones are found in brass plate form or made of different lentils during rituals on special occasions.

== Structure ==
It is depicted as a Kalasha with an eye on both sides and a core made of a fully blossomed lotus. It has many circles of petals marking different concepts in Jainism.

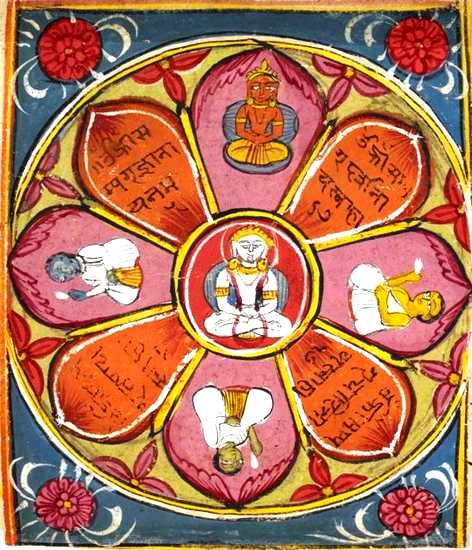
Navapada of Siddhachakra

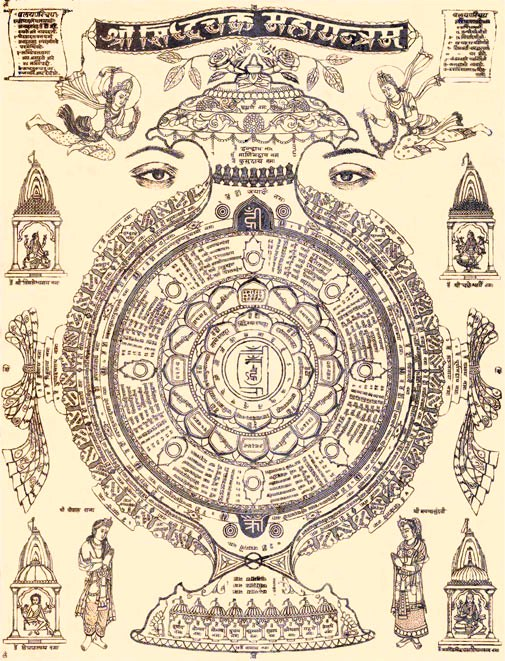
Siddhachakra Mahayantra

=== Kalasha ===
A Kalasha is depicted as a pot with a large base and a mouth generally covered with a lid or topped with a coronet of mango leaves and a coconut. It is decorated with clothes and ornaments in images. Two eyes are depicted around the Kalasha, symbolising right faith and right knowledge.

At the neck of the Kalasha are nine small pots known as Nav Nidhi which describe nine kinds of wealth or treasures. Nine shrines dedicated to Navagraha are at the base of Kalasha which indicate nine 'cosmic influencers'.

=== Lotus ===
At the core is a fully blossomed lotus with many circles of petals marking different concepts in Jainism. Navpada (Nine elements) is at the core surrounded by circles of petals called valaya. There is variation in the number of circles made by the petals in different images but generally there are ten circles.

==== Navapada ====
Navapada is the core of the lotus. Navapada includes five supreme beings having virtues, Guni or Panch Parmeshthi, and four right virtues, Gunas according to Śvetāmbara tradition. Their attributes are described in 108 scriptures. They are also illustrated in silver or copper plates for worship. In the Digambara tradition, it has the same Panch Parmeshthi but the other four elements are different.

No.	Śvetāmbara	Digambara	Place	Description	Colour	Attributes
1	Arihant		centre	enlightened soul who teaches world the path of liberation		12
2	Siddha		Upper centre	liberated soul residing in Moksha		8
3	Acharya		Right	the preceptor, leader of Sangha (community)		36
4	Upadhyaya		Lower centre	a person with knowledge who teaches to others		25
5	Sadhu		Left	Jain monks and nuns		27
6	Darshan	Chaitya	Upper right	Right Faith/Jain Image		67
7	Gyan	Chaityalaya	Lower right	Right Knowledge/Jain temple		51
8	Charitra	Dharmachakra	Upper left	Right Conduct/Wheel of Dharma		70
9	Tapa	Shruta	Lower left	Right Austerities/Jain scriptures		50

==== Valaya ====
Navapada is surrounded by circles of petals called valaya which describe various concepts and guarding deities as mantras.

Circle No.	Petal	Described concept	Notes	Details
1	Nucleus	Aryandrapad	Part of Navpada	Arihant of Navapada, many times as a mantra
2	Small circle	Vowels	in Sanskrit	Vowels and sounds
3	8 petals	8 padas	Part of Navpada	Other 8 members of Navapada
4	16 petals	49 basic sounds	in Sanskrit	Vowels and sounds
5	8 sections	48 labdhi	powers of higher souls	in group of 6 in each section
6	8 sections	8 Guru footprints	with mantra having names	2 petals, each at two poles have sacred mantra: Hrim and Klim
7	8 sections	8 Goddesses	Jaya devi etc.	Guarding deities
8	16 petals	16 Adhishthayak Dev	Principal deities	Guarding deities
9	16 petals	16 Vidya devi	Goddesses	Guarding deities
10	48 petals	48 Attendant deities	24 Yaksha and 24 Yakshini	Guarding deities

Some have additional petals describing four vira (guarding deities) and ten Digpala (protectors of ten directions).

=== Surroundings ===
The sun and moon are depicted on the right and left side of the Kalasha, respectively. There are four shrines with guarding deities in the four corners: Kshetrapala, Vimaleshwar, Chakreshvari, and Aprasiddha Siddha Chakradhisthanak. Sometimes King Shripal and Queen Mayanasundari are depicted on the sides of the Kalasha as based on a legend.

== Rituals ==
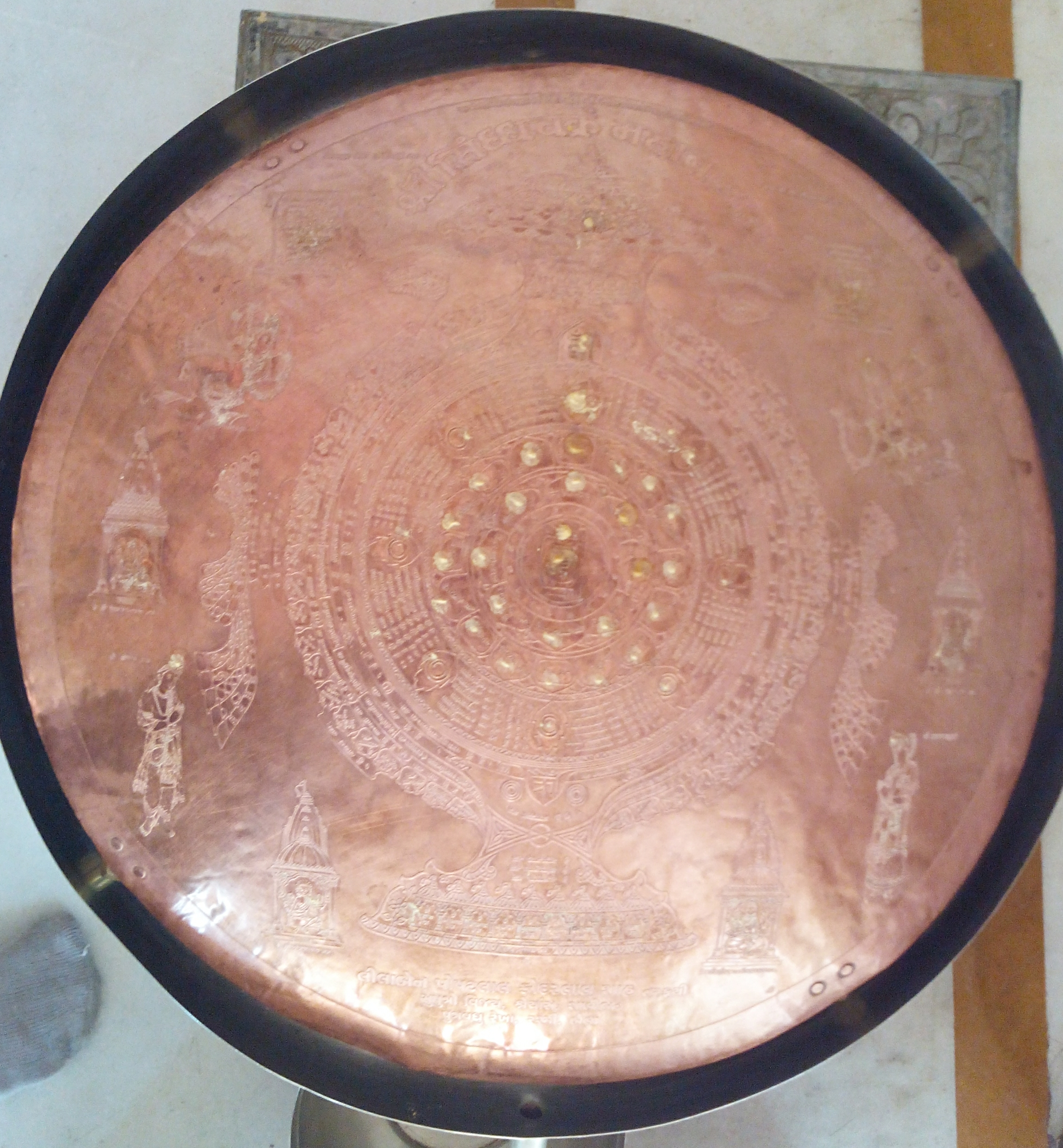
Brass metal Siddhachakra yantra used for worship

=== Navapada Aradhana and Ayambil Oli ===
Navapada Aradhana is associated with the Shripal-Mayanasundari legend. Navapada Aradhana is performed by meditating on Navapada and doing an ayambil. In an ayambil, only one meal is eaten each day of plain food without any spices, sugar, salt, oil, butter, milk, vegetables or fruits. It is performed for nine days, twice a year. It is called Ayambil Oli. It falls in the months of Chaitra (March/April) and Ashwin (September/October) of the Jain calendar. A procession of Siddhachakra is carried out in towns known as Jalayatra.

=== Siddhachakra Puja ===
It is a complex ritual taking a half day in which a whole Siddhachakra is created on a floor using lentils. Mantras are recited along with performing puja starting in the centre of the Siddhachakra and moving towards the outside.

== See also ==
- Jain rituals and festivals
- Jain symbols
- Tirthankara
