= Namokar Mantra =

Jain mantra

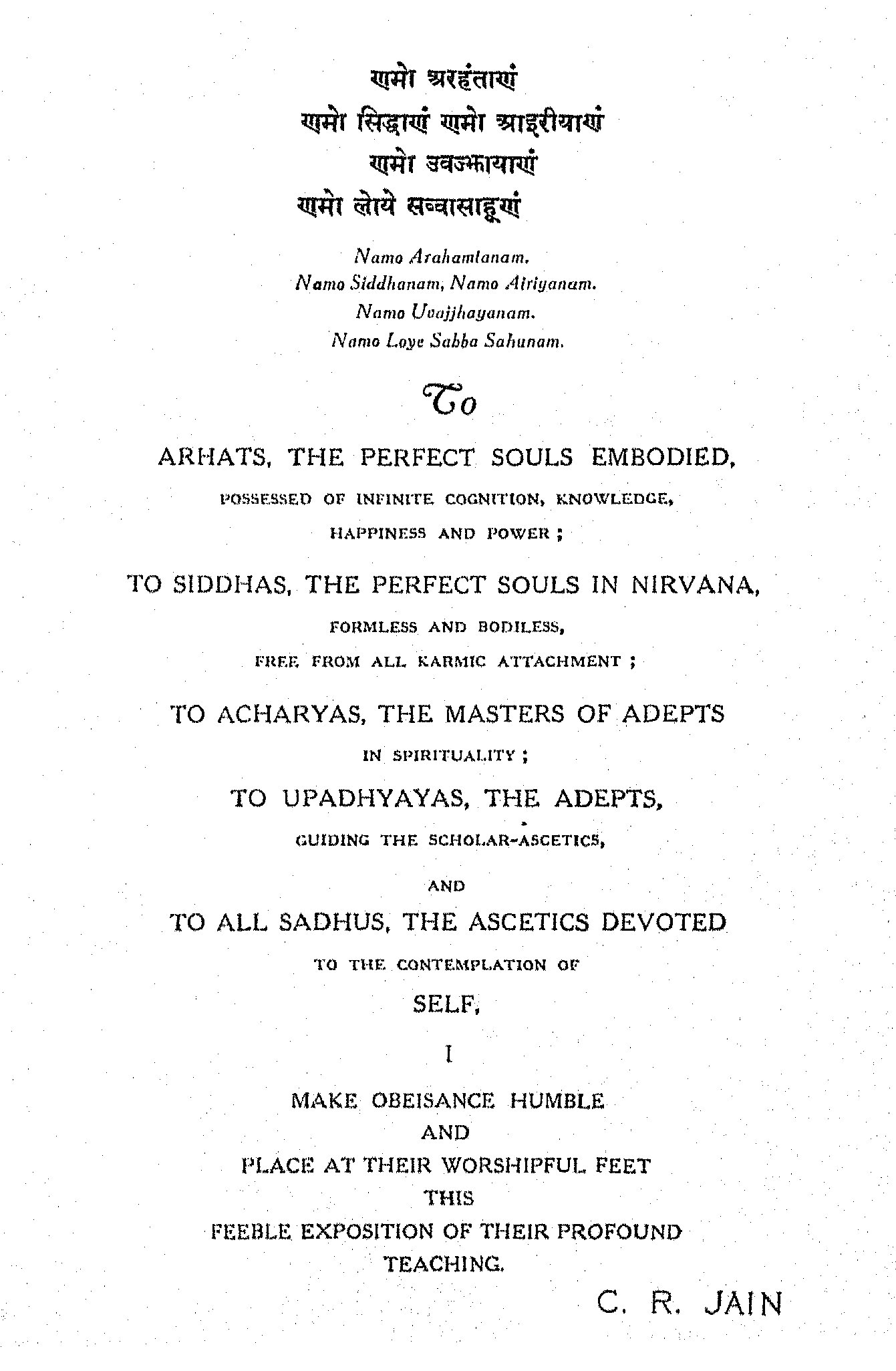
- Ṇamōkāra mantra / Navkar Mantra

Information
- Religion: Jainism
- Language: Ardhamagadhi Prakrit

The Ṇamōkāra mantra is the most significant mantra in Jainism, and one of the oldest mantras in continuous practice. This is the first prayer recited by the Jains while meditating. The mantra is also variously referred to as the Pancha Namaskāra Mantra, Namaskāra Mantra, Navakāra Mantra, Namaskāra Mangala or Paramesthi Mantra. It is dedicated to the Panch-Parmeshthi, namely the arihant, the siddhas, the acharyas, the upadhyaya and all the ascetics.

== History ==
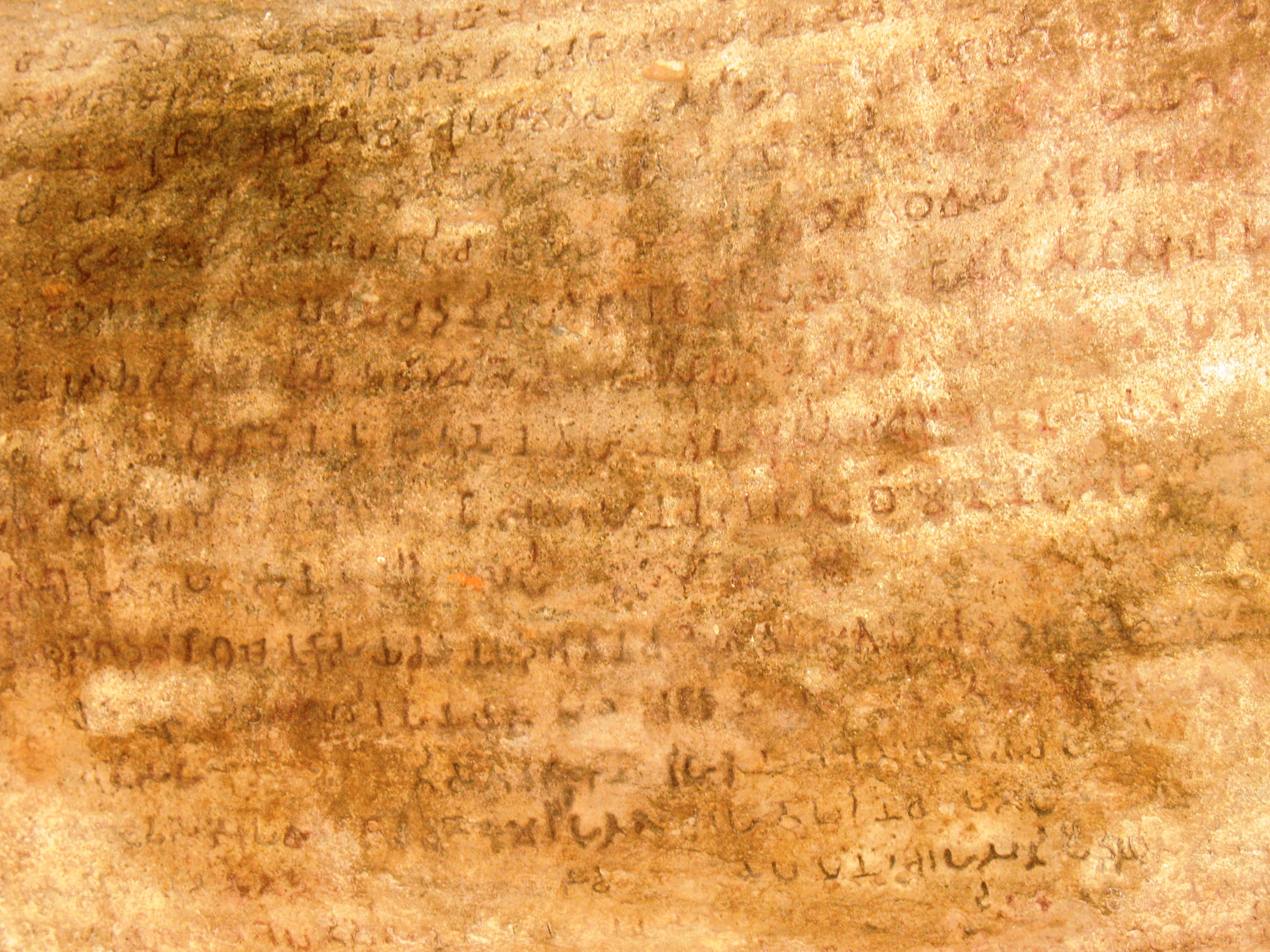
Hathigumpha inscription by King Khāravela at Udayagiri Hills

A short inscription (dated 200 BCE to 100 BCE) found in Pale Jain Caves in Maharashtra mentions Namo Arahatanam (नमो अरहतानं) or Namo Arahantanam (नमो अरहंतानं), only the first line of Namokara Mantra. In Kushana and Shaka periods of 1st century CE to the first quarter of 2nd century, only the first line was prevalent. The Hathigumpha inscription dated between 2nd century BCE to 1st century CE starts with Namo Arahantanam (नमो अरहंतानं) and Namo Save Sidhanam (नमो सवे सिधानं), the first two lines of Namokar Mantra. The rest of the lines are not there. It was inscribed by the Jain monarch Kharavela of Kalinga kingdom. According to historian M. A. Dhaky, these two lines were originally used as mangala (auspicious opening lines) in written works and rituals then.

The Namaskara Mantra with all Pañca-Parameṣṭhi (five supreme souls) was first mentioned in the auspicious opening lines in the condensed edition of Vyākhyāprajñapti. This version also replaces Ardhamagadhi नं with Maharashtrian Prakrit णं. In condensed edition of Avashyakasutra (dated circa last quarter of 5th century), the नं is also replaced with णं as well as अरहंत (Arahant) with अरिहंत (Arihant). Shatkandagam (circa 475–525 CE) and later Visheshavashyakbhashyavritti (circa 725 CE) and Anuyogadwarasuchi shows नमो (Namo) replaced with more Prakit णमो (Namo). However, most Śvetāmbaras still use नमो (Namo) as the Śvetāmbara canon states that Tirthankaras' sermons are in Ardhamagadhi Prakrit, so they prefer the version with नमो (Namo) as they consider it to be the original form of the mantra. Digambaras, on the other hand, believe that Tirthankaras do not speak after attaining Kevala jnana and that there is no specific language in their sermons. Most Digambaras, therefore, prefer reciting the newer version of the mantra written in Maharashtri Prakrit with णमो (Namo).

Composed around the beginning of the Common Era, Chattarimangalam Stotra mentions only Arhat, Siddha, Sadhu and Kevalipragnapti Dharma (Dharma as prescribed by Omniscients) as four chief auspicious. So the three lines regarding Acharya, Upadhyaya and Sadhu must have been added later. The last four lines about phala-prashashti (benefits of chanting) are not older than 6th century CE and are not found in any older works, according to Dhaky. The importance of it as a mantra in texts, traditions, rituals and meditation arose thereafter.

== The Ṇamōkāra Mantra ==
Prakrit	Transliteration	Meaning
णमो अरिहंताणं	Ṇamō Arihantāṇaṁ	I bow to the Arihants
णमो सिद्धाणं	Ṇamō Siddhāṇaṁ	I bow to the Siddhas.
णमो आयरियाणं	Ṇamō Ayariyāṇaṁ	I bow to the Acharyas.
णमो उवज्झायाणं	Ṇamō Uvajjhāyāṇaṁ	I bow to the Upadhyayas.
णमो लोए सव्व साहूणं	Ṇamō Lōē Savva Sāhūṇaṁ	I bow to all of the Sages of the world.
एसो पंच णमोक्कारो, सव्व पावप्पणासणो	Ēsō pan̄ca ṇamōkkārō, savva pāvappaṇāsaṇō	This five-fold salutation completely destroys all the sins.
मंगला णं च सव्वेसिं, पढमं हवई मंगलं	Maṅgalā ṇaṁ ca savvēsiṁ, paḍhamaṁ havaī maṅgalaṁ	And, of all auspicious mantras, (it) is indeed the foremost auspicious one.

=== Abbreviations ===
The Namokar Mantra may abbreviated to Oṃ Namaḥ Siddhanam (6 syllables), Om Nhi (2 syllables), or just Om (1 syllable) in Jain literature.

== Meaning ==
Below is the meaning of the Namokar Mantra line by line, wherein the devotee first bows to the five supreme souls or Pañca-Parameṣṭhi:

- Arihant – Those who have destroyed the four inimical karmas
- Siddha – The persons who have achieved "Siddhi"
- Acharyas – The teachers who teach how to behave / live one's life
- Upadhyaya – Preceptor of less advanced ascetics
- Sādhu – The monks or sages in the world practicing Samyak Charitra (right conduct)
- The practitioner also says that by bowing to all these five supreme souls
- All of his or her karmas can get destroyed and
- Wishes for well-being of each and every living entity
- The practitioner finally says that this mantra is the most auspicious one

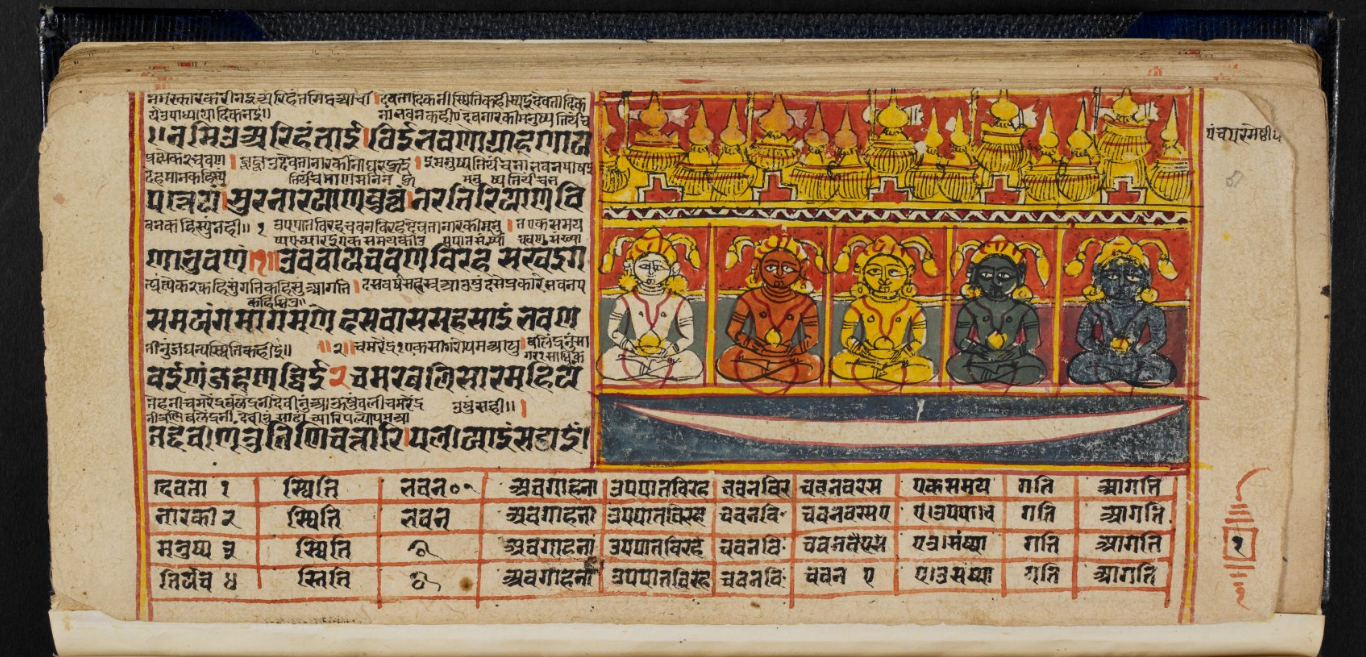
The miniature depicts the Pancaparameṣṭhi on Siddhaśilā. Folio from the Saṁgrahaṇīratna by Śvetāmbara ascetic Śrīcandra in Prakrit with interlinear Gujarati commentary, 17th century (British Library Or 2116C)

There is no mention of any particular names of the gods or any specific person. The prayer is done towards the guṇa (the good qualities) of the gods, teachers and the saints. Jains do not ask for any favors or material benefits from the tirthankaras or monastics. This mantra simply serves as a gesture of deep respect towards beings whom they believe are spiritually evolved, as well as to remind the people of their ultimate goal i.e. moksha (liberation).

== Meditation ==
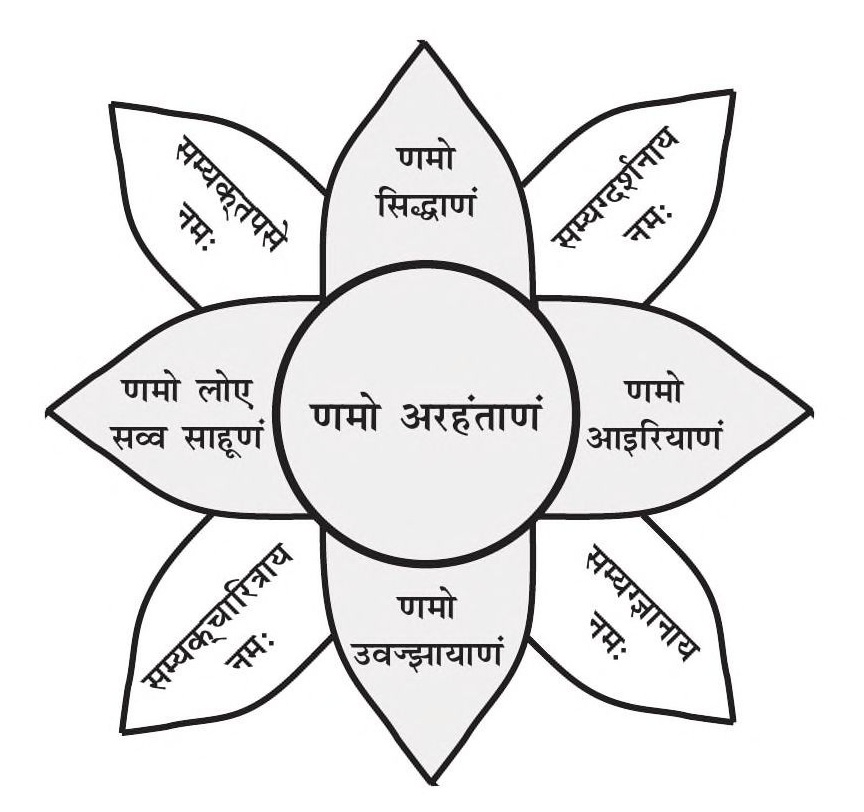
Obeisance to Pañca-Parameṣṭhi (five supreme beings)

According to Dravyasaṃgraha, a major Jain text:

Meditate on, recite or chant the sacred mantras, consisting of thirty-five, sixteen, six, five, four, two and one letter(s), pronouncing the virtues of the five supreme beings (Pañca-Parameṣṭhi). Besides, meditate on and chant other mantras as per the teachings of the Preceptor (guru).

== See also ==
- Siddhachakra
- God in Jainism
- Bhaktamara Stotra
- Jain meditation
- Mul Mantar

== Sources ==
- Voorst, Robert E. Van (2015), RELG: World (Second ed.), Cengage Learning, ISBN 978-1-285-43468-1
- von Glasenapp, Helmuth (1999). Der Jainismus: Eine Indische Erlosungsreligion [Jainism: An Indian Religion of Salvation] (in German). Shridhar B. Shrotri (trans.). Delhi: Motilal Banarsidass. ISBN 81-208-1376-6.
- Jain, Vijay K. (2013), Ācārya Nemichandra's Dravyasaṃgraha, Vikalp Printers, ISBN 9788190363952, "Non-copyright"
- Jain, Champat Rai (1917), The Ratna Karanda Sravakachara, The Central Jaina Publishing House
