= Upadhan =

Religious practices performed by Śrāvakas in Jainism

Upadhāna (Sanskrit: उपधान) are the religious practices performed by Śrāvakas in Jainism.

The Updhana Tap should be performed in Paushadh Vrata, which is replicating the lifestyle of an ideal Jain monk, which contain vows to not harm any organisms throughout the day. It is to be done under the guidance of Jain monks.

Upadhana can be performed in three parts for 47 days 35 days and 28 days separately. During these days one must fast on one day and the second day one must do Ekasan, that is eating one meal in one place. It is called Nivi.

The first 47 day Updhan has three parts: 1st Adhaariyu, 2nd Adhaariyu, and Chakia-Chaukia. The first Adhaariyu and 2nd Adhaariyu are of 18 days each, and Chakia-Chaukia is of 11 days.

Next 35 days Tapa is known as Patrishyaa, and 28 days Tapa is known as Athavishyu.

Every day one must recite the Rosary for 20 times saying the Namokar Mantra; one must also perform 100 Khamasaman [Kneeling with head touching the ground]; must also perform Kayotsarga (meditating and chanting the Logassa Sutra for 100 times and must also perform the Paushadh vrat etc.

Along with these, one must study some Jain Agamas. This austerity is not only severe but prolonged. A special austerity called Pratima must also be performed by a Śrāvaka to purify and perfect their life. In the Agama Shastras, 11 types of Pratima are mentioned.

(1) Samyaktva (2) Vrat. (3) Samayik (4) Paushadh (5) Niyam (6) Brahmacharya, (7) Sachitta Tyag (8) Uddhisht (9) Preshyarambha tyag (10) Arambha tyag (11) Shramanbhuth

This vow should be taken for one or a fixed number of days according to rules.
