= Siddhashrama =

Mystical hermitage located in the Himalayas

Siddhashrama (Siddhāśrama; Devanagari:सिद्धाश्रम), popularly called Gyangunj, is considered as a mystical hermitage, which according to a tradition, is located in a secret land deep in the Himalayas, where great yogis, sadhus, and sages who are siddhas live. This place is also revered as the mystical land of Shambhala by Tibetans. According to another tradition, the Siddhashrama is located in the Tibetan region, nearby Kailash parvat. Though any Sadhu, Sannyasi, Yeti, Monk and Yogi might have known 'Siddhashram' by any name or various cults might have used different worship or Sadhana methods according to their beliefs.The context of this supernatural land has been mentioned in many ancient scriptures along with four Vedas. The Siddhashram is described as a divine place in spiritual journey. Thus it is also believed that while discharging their divine works in this universe the spiritually empowered Yogis remain in constant touch with Siddhashram and they visit it regularly. Siddhashram is considered as the base of spiritual consciousness, heart of divinity and the mortification land of great Rishis. Thus, the Siddhashram is assumed as a very scarce divine place. It's believed by Hindus, Buddhists that it is possible to get the divine power to enter this scarce place by doing hard works through Sadhana procedure and following Sadhana path. Siddhashram is considered to be a secret and mystical land deep in the Himalayas, where it is said and is believed by Hindus that great siddha yogis, sadhus, and sages live. Siddhashram is believed to be the ashram of Ancient saints, sages & Yogis of high order. It is referred to in many Indian epics, the Veda, Upanishads and Puranas including the Rigveda, one of the oldest scripture of human civilization. Siddhashram is considered to be the society for the enlightened people or siddhas. The person, who reaches high level in sadhana can reach the mystical siddhashram with the blessings of the guru, who is the regular of this place, as considered by believers. They are able to see it with their third eye. Its believed that this ashram lies near the Mansarovar lake and the Kailash. Siddha yogis and sanyasis are meditating in this place for thousands of years and it is believed that this place can't be seen with naked eye and can only be seen after meditation and other spiritual practices, as believed by many. Swami Vishuddhananda Paramahansa first talked of this place in public. He was taken there in His childhood by some adept and He did his sadhana in Gyanganj Ashram for long long years. Many in Hinduism believe that Maharishi Vashishtha, Vishwamitra, Kanada, Pulastya, Atri, Mahayogi Gorakhnath, Srimad Shankaracharya, Bheesma, Kripacharya can be seen wandering there in physical form and also one can have the privilege of listening to their sermons. Many Siddha yogi, yoginis, Apsara (Angel), saints are believed to be found meditating in this place. Those who allegedly went there say that the beautiful flowers in the garden, trees, birds, siddha-yoga lake, meditating saints and many other things of the place cannot be described in words. The exact location of this legendary kingdom is unknown as it is believed that Gyanganj artfully camouflages (willingly hides itself) itself from humans, as well as mapping technologies. Some also believe that Gyanganj exists in a different plane of reality and thus cannot be detected by satellites.

== In ancient Indian literature ==
Siddhashrama (literally, the hermitage of the siddhas) is referred to in the Ramayana, Mahabharata and the Puranas. In Valmiki's Ramayana it is said that Viswamitra has his hermitage in Siddhashrama and it was the erstwhile hermitage of Vishnu, when he appeared as the Vamana Avatar. He takes Rama and Lakshmana to Siddhashrama to exterminate the demons who are disturbing his religious sacrifices. In the Narada Purana (Purva,1.25), Siddhashrama is mentioned as the hermitage of sage Suta.

== In recent writings ==
In the modern era, the knowledge of Siddhashram is first referred by the Pandit Gopinath Kaviraj. It is also mentioned in the book Autobiography of an Avadhoota by Swami Nadananda.
