= Parasparopagraho Jivanam =

Jain aphorism from the Tattvārtha Sūtra

Jain emblem with the motto: परस्परोपग्रहो जीवानाम् (Parasparopagraho Jīvānām)

Parasparopagraho Jīvānām (Sanskrit: परस्परोपग्रहो जीवानाम्) is a Jain aphorism from the Tattvārtha Sūtra [5.21]. It is translated as "Souls render service to one another". It is also translated as, "All life is bound together by mutual support and interdependence." These translations are virtually the same (by virtue, that is), because Jains believe that every living being, from a plant or a bacterium to human, has a soul and the concept forms the very basis of Jainism.

== Motto of Jainism ==
The aphorism Parasparopagraho Jīvānām has been accepted as the motto of Jainism. It stresses the philosophy of non-violence and ecological harmony on which the Jain ethics and doctrine—especially the doctrines of Ahimsa and Anekantavada—are based. This motto is inscribed in Devanagari script at the base of the symbol of Jainism which was adopted by all sects of Jainism while commemorating the 2500th anniversary of nirvana of Mahavira.

== Jain declaration of Nature ==
The noted Indian Jurist and Jain leader, Laxmi Mall Singhvi in his famous "Jain declaration of Nature", notes:

Māhavīra proclaimed a profound truth for all times to come when he said: "One who neglects or disregards the existence of earth, air, fire, water and vegetation disregards his own existence which is entwined with them." Jain cosmology recognizes the fundamental natural phenomenon of symbiosis or mutual dependence, which forms the basis of the modern day science of ecology. It is relevant to recall that the term `ecology’ was coined in the latter half of the nineteenth century from the Greek word oikos, meaning `home’, a place to which one returns. Ecology is the branch of biology which deals with the relations of organisms to their surroundings and to other organisms. The ancient Jain scriptural aphorism Parasparopagraho Jīvānām (All life is bound together by mutual support and interdependence) is refreshingly contemporary in its premise and perspective. It defines the scope of modern ecology while extending it further to a more spacious ‘home’. It means that all aspects of nature belong together and are bound in a physical as well as a metaphysical relationship. Life is viewed as a gift of togetherness, accommodation and assistance in a universe teeming with interdependent constituents.

The extent of all life being bound together by mutual support and interdependence may also be put into context among the first known postulations for the existence of unseen microbial life and atomic particles, by the Jains.

== See also ==
- One Health
