= Arihant (Jainism) =

Soul status concept of Jainism

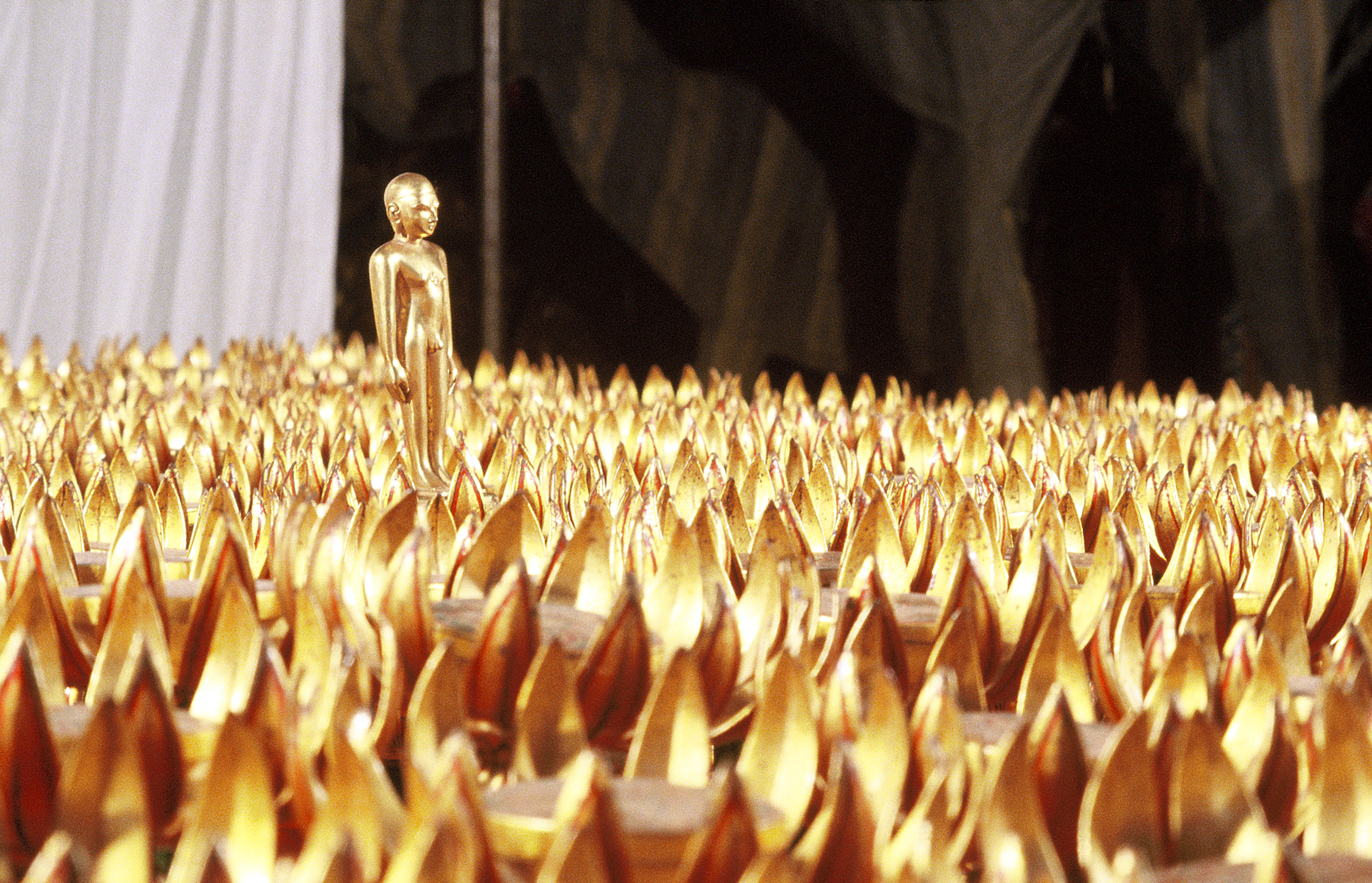
Sculpture depicting Rishabhanatha, the first Arihant of the present half cycle of time (avasarpini) moving over lotus after attaining omniscience.

Arihant (Jain Prakrit: अरिहन्त, Sanskrit: अर्हत् arhat, lit. 'conqueror') is a jiva (soul) who has conquered inner passions such as attachment, anger, pride and greed. Having destroyed four inimical karmas, an arihant realizes the pure self. Arihants are also called kevalins (omniscient beings) as they possess kevala jnana (pure infinite knowledge). An arihant is also called a jina ("victor"). At the end of their life, arihants destroy remaining karmas and attain moksha (liberation) and become siddhas. Arihantas have a body while siddhas are bodiless pure spirit. The Ṇamōkāra mantra, the fundamental prayer dedicated to Pañca-Parameṣṭhi (five supreme beings), begins with Ṇamō arihantāṇaṁ, "obeisance to the arihants".

Kevalins - omniscient beings - are said to be of two kinds

1. Tirthankara kevalī: 24 human spiritual guides who after attaining omniscience teach the path to salvation.
2. Sāmānya kevalī: Kevalins who are concerned with their own liberation.

According to Jains, every soul has the potential to become an arihant. A soul which destroys all kashayas or inner enemies like anger, ego, deception, and greed, which are responsible for the perpetuation of ignorance, becomes an arihant.

== Philosophy ==
According to Jain texts, omniscience is attained on the destruction of four types of karmas– namely deluding, the knowledge-obscuring, the perception-obscuring, and the obstructive karmas, in the order mentioned. The arihants are said to be free from the following eighteen imperfections:

1. janma – (re)birth
2. jarā – old-age
3. triśā – thirst
4. kśudhā – hunger
5. vismaya – astonishment
6. arati – displeasure
7. kheda – regret
8. roga – sickness
9. śoka – grief
10. mada – pride
11. moha – delusion
12. bhaya – fear
13. nidrā – sleep
14. cintā – anxiety
15. sveda – perspiration
16. rāga – attachment
17. dveśa – aversion
18. maraņa – death

=== Omniscience ===
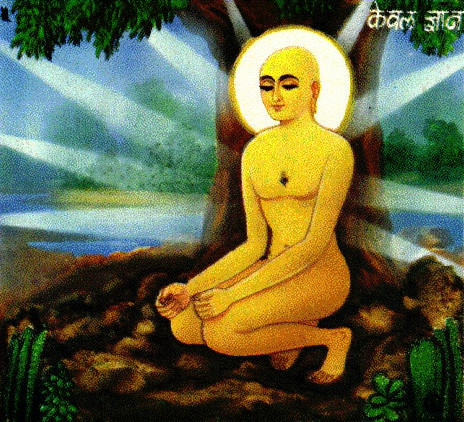
Kevala Jñāna of Mahavira

In Jainism, omniscience is said to be the infinite, all-embracing knowledge that reflects, as it were, in a mirror, all substances and their infinite modes, extending through the past, the present, and the future. According to Jain texts, omniscience is the natural attribute of the pure souls. The self-attaining omniscience becomes a kevalin. Pandit Banarasidas in Samaysaar Natak describes the Omniscient soul as:

जोग धरै रहै जोगसौं भिन्न,

अनंत गुनातम केवलज्ञानी । तासु हृदै-द्रहसौं निकसी, सरितासम है श्रुत-सिंधु समानी ।। याते अनंत नयातम लच्छन, सत्य स्वरूप सिधंत बखानी । बुद्ध लखै न लखै दुरबुद्ध,

सदा जगमाँहि जगै जिनवानी ।।३।।

Meaning: The omniscient Lord has perfect, complete knowledge. He does have a physical form but has separated himself from his material body. From his heart-type of lake, a river has come out in the form of spiritual preachings and has merged into the ocean of holy scriptures. Therefore, such doctrines are called the ultimate truth, encompassing infinite partial points of view. The aspirant souls end up recognising such principles. The foolish, wrong-faithed persons fail to identify such truth. May such Omniscient knowledge of Arihants be victorious in the universe!

The four infinitudes (ananta cātuṣṭaya) are:

1. ananta jñāna, infinite knowledge
2. ananta darśana, perfect perception due to the destruction of all darśanāvaraṇīya karmas
3. ananta sukha, infinite bliss
4. ananta vīrya – infinite energy

== Tirthankaras ==
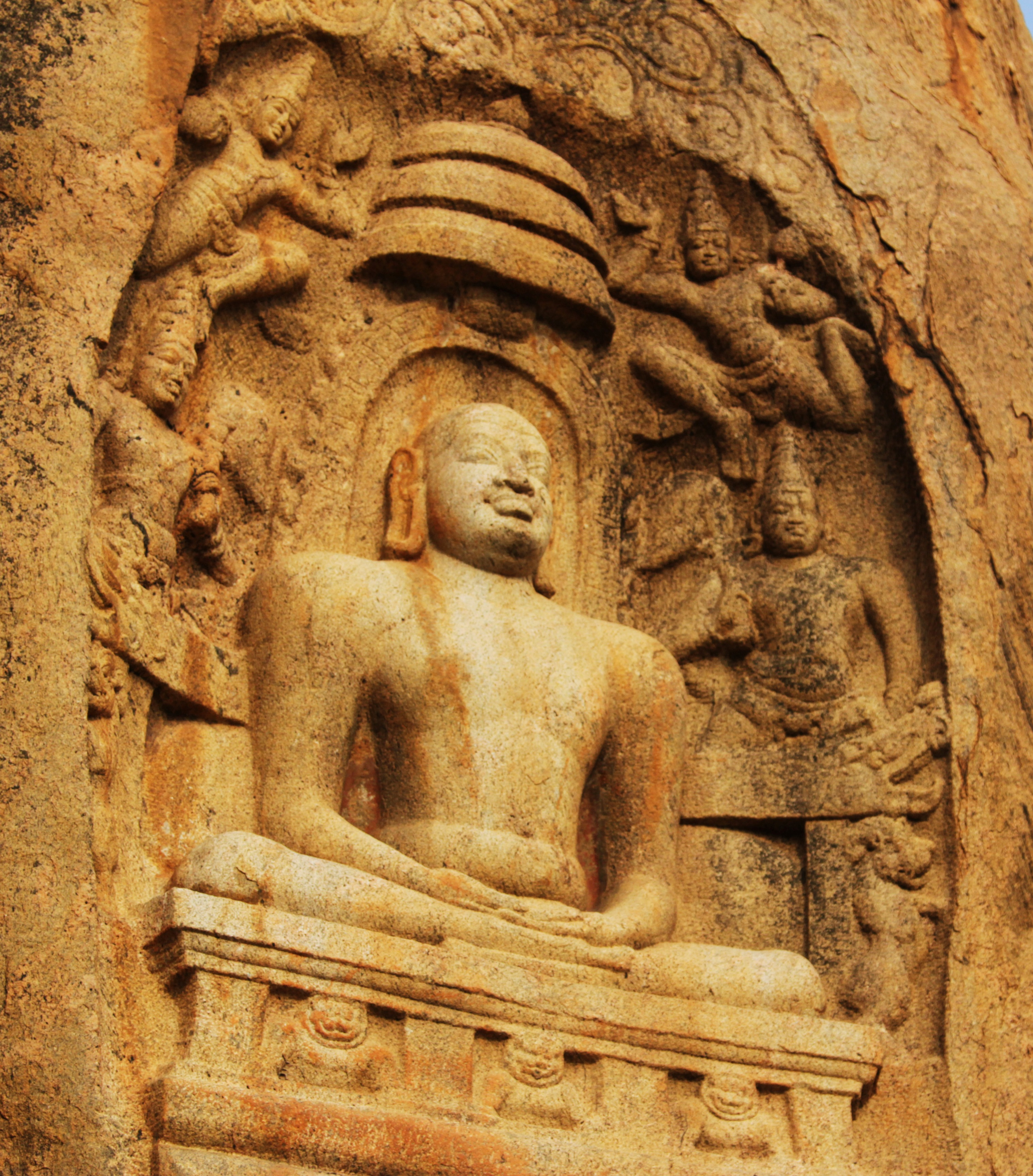
Image of Vardhaman Mahāvīra, the 24th and last tirthankara of present half time cycle

Those arihants who re-establish the Jain faith are called tirthankaras. Tirthankaras revitalize the sangha, the fourfold order consisting of male saints (sādhus), female saints (sādhvis), male householders (śrāvaka) and female householders (srāvika).

The first tirthankara of the current time cycle was Ṛṣabhanātha, and the twenty-fourth and last Tirthankara was Mahavira, who lived from 599 BCE to 527 BCE.

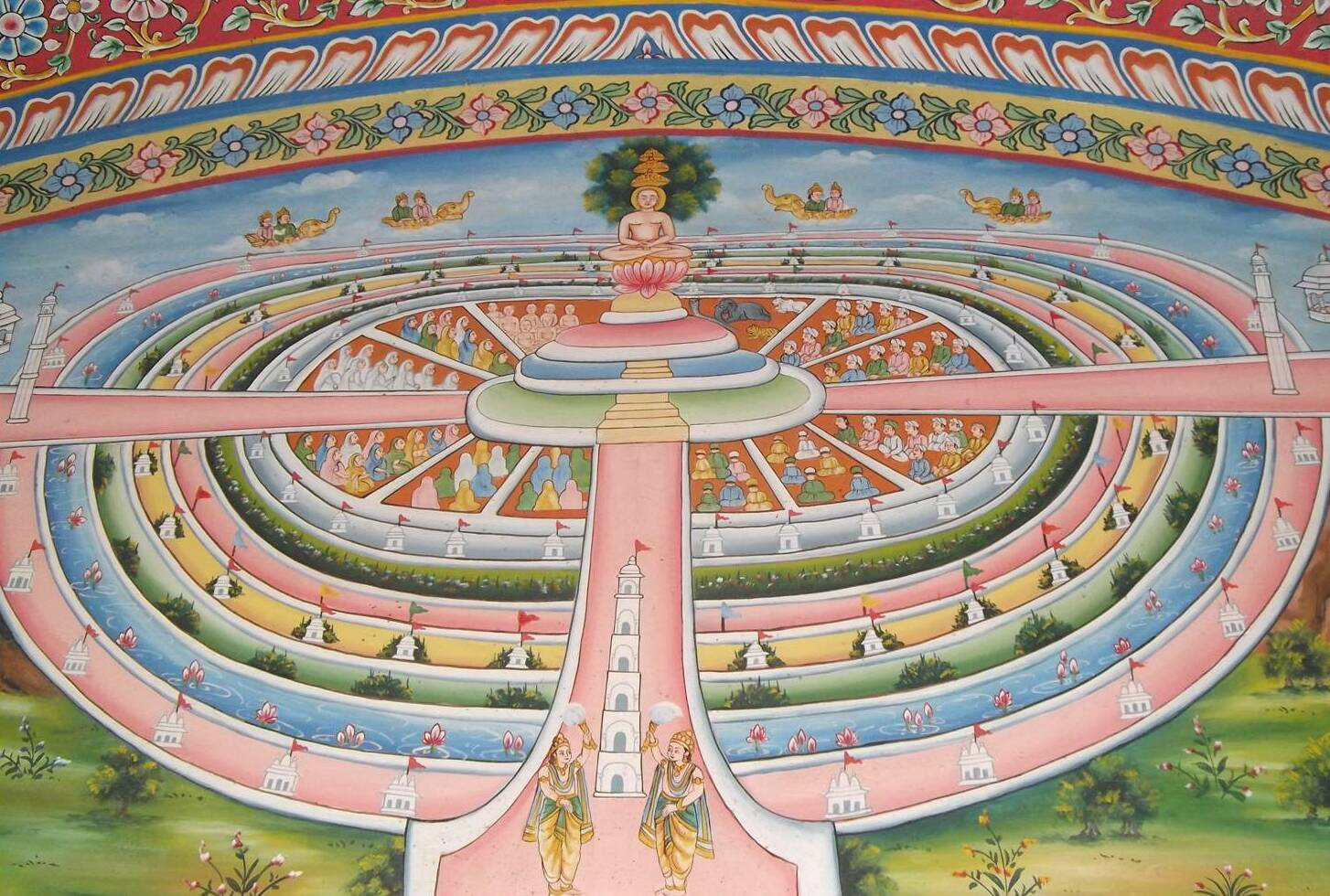
Samavasarana (divine preaching hall) where omniscient Arihantas preach

Jain texts mention forty-six attributes of arihants or tirthankaras. These attributes comprise four infinitudes (ananta chatushtaya), thirty-four miraculous happenings (atiśaya), and eight splendours (prātihārya).

The eight splendours (prātihārya) are:

1. aśokavrikśa – the Ashoka tree
2. siṃhāsana– bejeweled throne
3. chatra – three-tier canopy
4. bhāmadal – halo of unmatched luminance
5. divya dhvani – divine voice of the Lord without lip movement
6. puśpavarśā – shower of fragrant flowers
7. camara – waving of sixty-four majestic hand-fans
8. dundubhi – dulcet sound of kettle-drums and other musical instruments

== Liberation ==
At the time of nirvana (final release), the arihant sheds off the remaining four aghati karmas:

1. Nama (physical structure forming) karma
2. Gotra (status forming) karma
3. Vedniya (pain and pleasure causing) karma
4. Ayushya (life span determining) karma

These four karmas do not affect the true nature of the soul and are therefore called aghati karmas.

== Worship ==
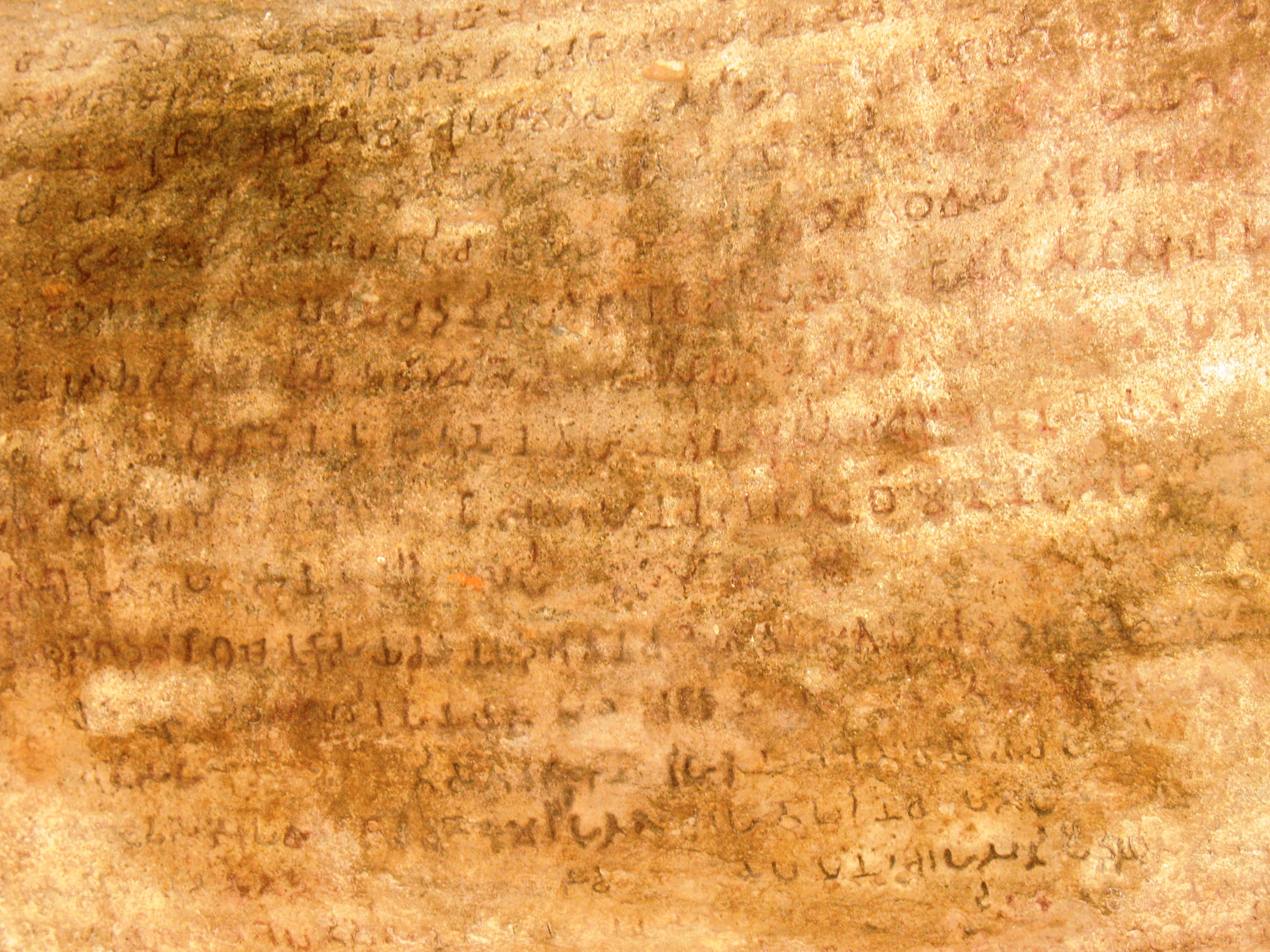
Hathigumpha inscription of King Khāravela at Udayagiri Caves, second century BCE, starts with Namokar Mantra

In the Ṇamōkāra mantra, Namo Arihantanam, Namo Siddhanam, Jains worship the arihants first and then the siddhas, even though the latter are perfected souls who have destroyed all karmas, but arihants are considered to be at a higher spiritual stage than siddhas. Since siddhas have attained ultimate liberation, they are unlikely to be directly accessible, but may be accessed through the wisdom they passed on. However arihants are accessible for the spiritual guidance of human society until their nirvana. The Dravyasaṃgraha, a major Jain text, states:

Having destroyed the four inimical varieties of karmas (ghātiyā karmas), possessed of infinite faith, happiness, knowledge and power, and housed in [a] most auspicious body (paramaudārika śarīra), that pure soul of the World Teacher (Arihant) should be meditated on.

— Dravyasaṃgraha (50)

== See also ==
- God in Jainism
- Jainism and non-creationism
- Śramaṇa
