= Pañca-Parameṣṭhi =

Fivefold hierarchy of religious authorities in Jainism

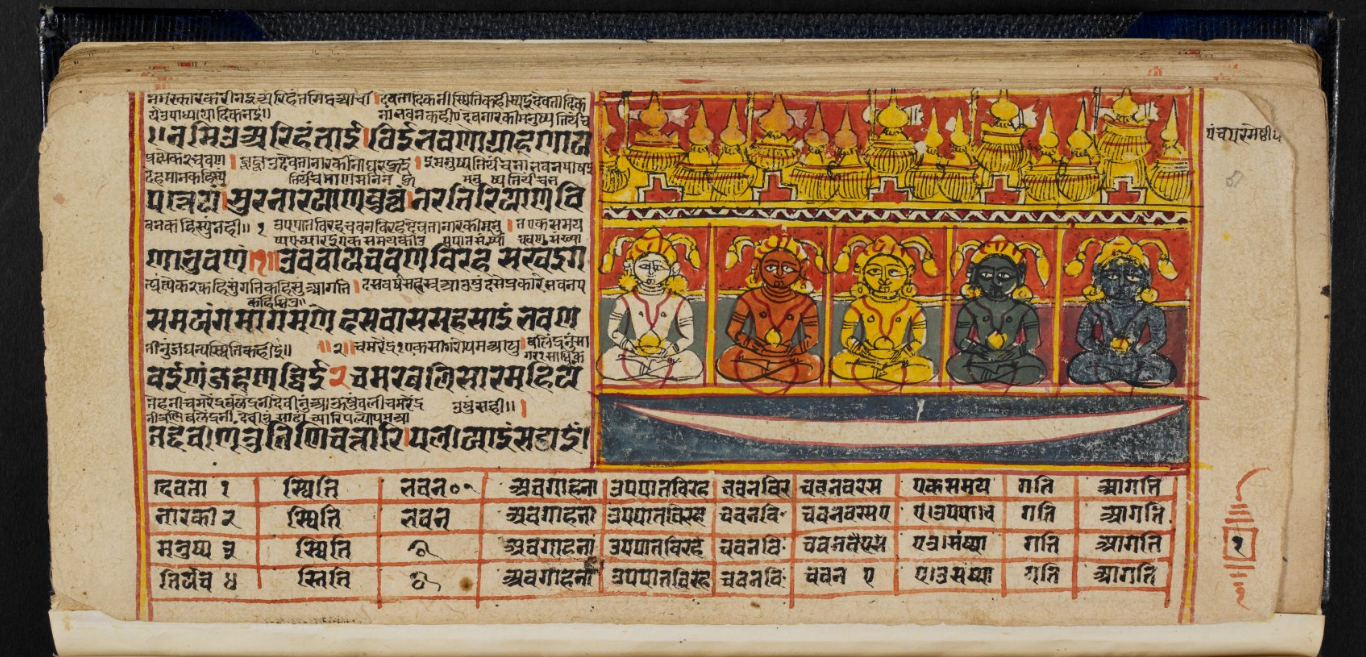
The miniature depicts the Pancaparameṣṭhi on Siddhaśilā. Folio from the Saṁgrahaṇīratna by Śvetāmbara ascetic Śrīcandra in Prakrit with interlinear Gujarati commentary, 17th century (British Library Or 2116C)

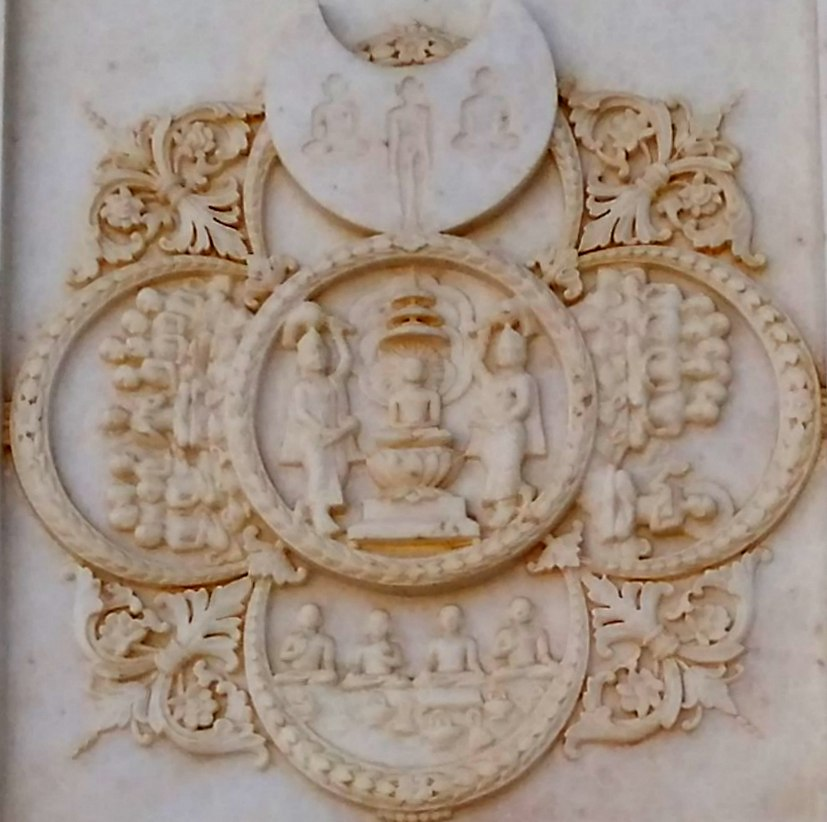
Relief depicting Pañca-Parameṣṭhi. Shri Mahaveer Ji temple

The Pañca-Parameṣṭhi (Sanskrit: पञ्चपरमेष्ठी, lit. 'five supreme beings') in Jainism is a fivefold hierarchy of religious authorities worthy of veneration.

== Overview ==
The five supreme beings are:

1. Arihant: The awakened souls who have attained kevala jnana are considered as Arihants. The 24 tirthankaras or Jinas, the legendary founding figures of Jainism in the present time cycle, are Arihants. All tirthankaras are Arihants, but not all Arihants are tirthankaras.
2. Siddha (Ashiri): The souls which have been liberated from the birth and death cycle.
3. Acarya
4. Upadhyaya ("Preceptors")
5. Muni or Jain monks

The five initials, viz. A+A+A+U+M are taken as forming the Aum syllable.

== Five supreme beings ==
The more ancient canonical texts of the Śvetāmbara sect mention Pañca-Parameṣṭhi (five supreme beings) to be the venerable beings in the universe.

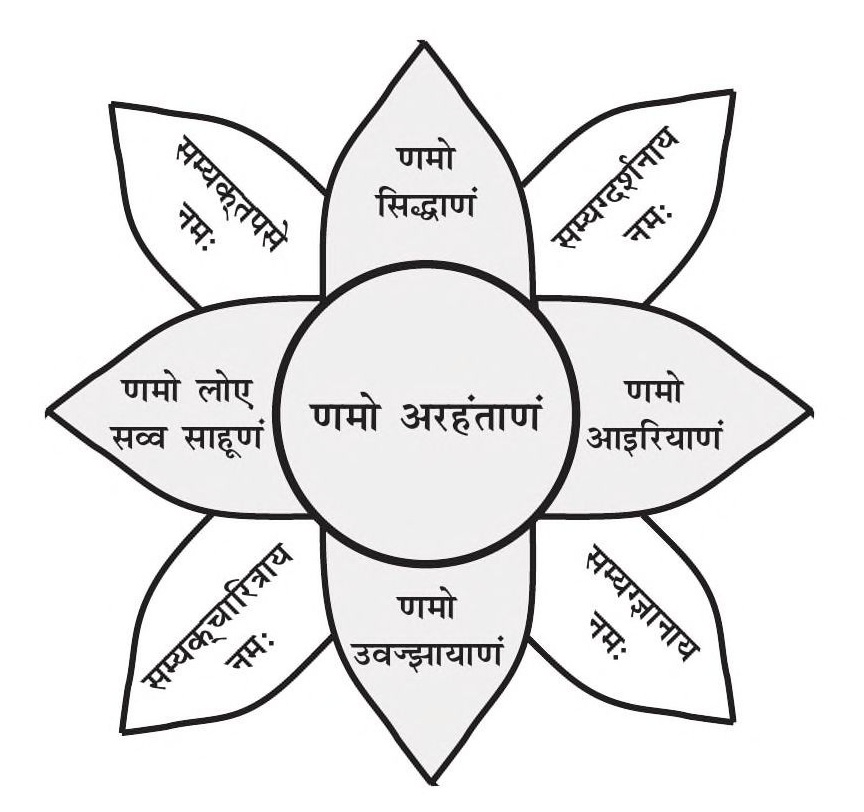
Obeisance to Pañca-Parameṣṭhi (five supreme beings)

The Dravyasaṃgraha, a Digambara text, succinctly characterizes the five Supreme Beings (Pañca-Parameṣṭhi).

1. Definition of the World Teacher (Arhat) - verse 50.
2. Definition of the liberated souls (Siddha) - verses 51.
3. Definition of the Chief Preceptor (Acarya) - verse 52.
4. Definition of the Preceptor (Upadhyaya) - verse 53.
5. Definition of the Ascetic (Sadhu) - verse 54.

Meditate on, recite or chant the sacred mantras, consisting of thirty-five, sixteen, six, five, four, two and one letter(s), pronouncing the virtues of the five supreme beings (Pañca-Parameṣṭhi). Besides, meditate on and chant other mantras as per the teachings of the Preceptor (guru).

=== Arihant ===
Having destroyed the four inimical varieties of karmas (ghātiyā karmas), possessed of infinite faith, happiness, knowledge and power, and housed in most auspicious body (paramaudārika śarīra), that pure soul of the World Teacher (Arhat) should be meditated on.

— Dravyasaṃgraha (50)

== See also ==
- Namokar Mantra
- Paramita
- Jainism
