= Upadhyay =

Surname list

Upadhyay is a surname. Notable people who bear the name include:

- Amar Upadhyay (born 1976), Indian model, film and television actor
- Amod Prasad Upadhyay (1936–2025), Nepalese social worker and politician
- Ayodhya Prasad Upadhyay (1865–1947), writer of Hindi literature
- Brahmabandhav Upadhyay (1861–1907), Bengali Brahmin, nephew of the Indian freedom-fighter Kalicharan Banerjee
- Chabilal Upadhyaya (1882–1980), Nepali Brahmin(Bahun), First President (Selected) of Assam Pradesh Congress Committee
- Chintan Upadhyay (born 1972), Indian artist, accused of a 2015 murder
- Chandrika Prasad Upadhyay (born 1950), Indian politician
- Deendayal Upadhyaya (1916–1968), Indian politician and thinker, co-founder of the political party Bharatiya Jana Sangh
- Darshan Upadhyaya (born 1994), Canada-born American esports player
- Harilal Upadhyay (1916–1994), Gujarati author
- Hema Upadhyay (1972–2015), Indian artist who lived and worked in Mumbai, India since 1998
- Kedar Nath Upadhyay, Chief Justice of Nepal at Supreme Court
- Kishore Upadhyaya (born 1958), Indian politician
- Krishnakant Upadhyay (born 1986), cricketer from Uttar Pradesh
- Lalit Upadhyay (born 1993), Indian field hockey player, part of Indian national team
- Moxila A. Upadhyaya, Indian-born U.S. Magistrate Judge
- Munishwar Dutt Upadhyay (1898–1983), Indian politician and statesman, leader in the Indian independence movement
- Purushottam Upadhyay (1934–2024), Indian musician, singer and composer
- Ram Kinkar Upadhyay (1924–2002), scholar on Indian scriptures and a recipient of Padma Bhushan
- Ramveer Upadhyay (1957–2022), Minister for Transport of Uttar Pradesh in 1997, Minister for Power, Medical Education (2002–2003), Minister for Power (2007–2012)
- Samrat Upadhyay (born 1964), Nepalese writer who writes in English
- Satish Upadhyay (born 1962), the President of the Delhi Unit of Bharatiya Janata Party (BJP)
- Seema Upadhyay (born 1965), Indian politician, belonging to Bahujan Samaj Party
- Shailendra Kumar Upadhyay (1929–2011), Nepalese diplomat and politician
- Shrikrishna Upadhyay (born 1945), Nepalese economist
- Umesh Upadhyay (born 1960), Indian television journalist and media executive
- Vikas Upadhyay (born 1975), Indian politician, general secretary for All India Youth Congress
