= Siddha =

One who is accomplished in Indian tradition

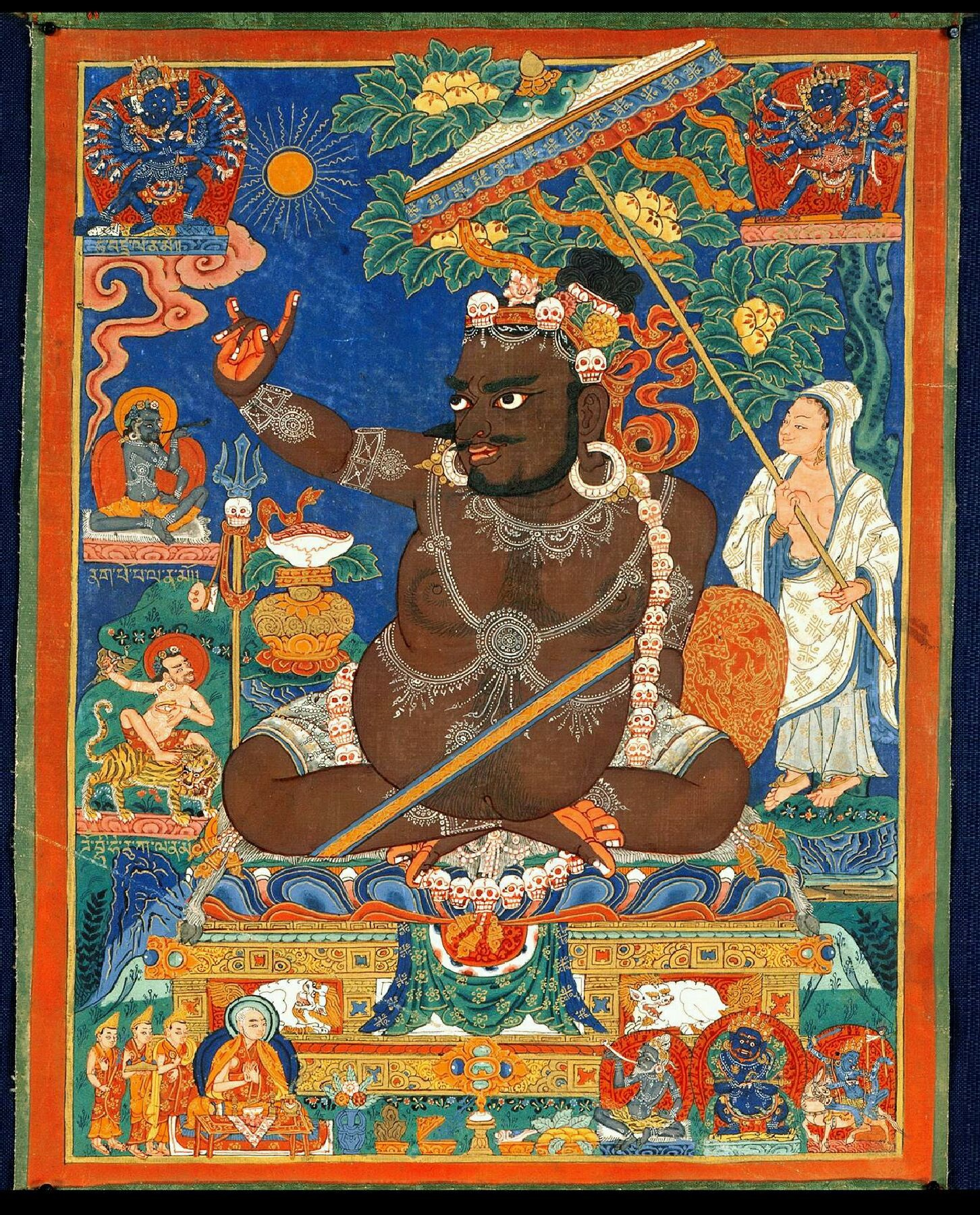
The mahasiddha Virūpa, 16th century

Siddha (Sanskrit: सिद्ध siddha; "perfected one") is a term that is used widely in Indian religions and culture. It means "one who is accomplished." It refers to perfected masters who have achieved a high degree of perfection of the intellect as well as liberation or enlightenment. In Jainism, the term is used to refer to liberated souls. Siddha may also refer to one who has attained a siddhi, paranormal capabilities.

Siddhas may broadly refer to siddhars, naths, ascetics, sadhus, or yogis because they all practice sādhanā.

== Jainism ==
Although the siddhas (the liberated beings) are formless and without a body, this is how the Jain altars often depict them. A Siddhapratima Yantra, bronze, ca. 1333.

In Jainism, the term siddha refers to liberated souls who have destroyed all karmas and obtained moksha. They are free from the transmigratory cycle of birth and death (saṃsāra) and are above Arihantas (omniscient beings). Siddhas do not have a body; they are souls in their purest form. They reside in Siddhashila, which is situated at the top of the universe. They are formless and have no passions and therefore are free from all temptations. They do not have any karmas, nor do they collect new karmas.

The Śvetāmbara Ācārāṅga Sūtra 1.197 describes siddhas in this way:

The liberated soul is not long nor small nor round nor triangular nor quadrangular nor circular; it is not black nor blue nor red nor green nor white; neither of good nor bad smell; not bitter nor pungent nor astringent nor sweet; neither rough nor soft; neither heavy nor light; neither cold nor hot; neither harsh nor smooth; it is without body, without resurrection, without contact (of matter), it is not feminine nor masculine nor neuter. The siddha perceives and knows all, yet is beyond comparison. Its essence is without form; there is no condition of the unconditioned. It is not sound, not colour, not smell, not taste, not touch or anything of that kind. Thus I say.

According to Jains, siddhas have eight specific characteristics or qualities. The ancient Tamil Jain Classic 'Choodamani Nigandu' describes the eight characteristics in a poem, which is given below.

கடையிலா ஞானத்தோடு காட்சி வீரியமே இன்ப
மிடையுறு நாமமின்மை விதித்த கோத்திரங்களின்மை
அடைவிலா ஆயுஇன்மை அந்தராயங்கள் இன்மை
உடையவன் யாவன் மற்று இவ்வுலகினுக்கு இறைவனாமே

The soul that has infinite knowledge (Ananta jnāna, கடையிலா ஞானம்), infinite vision or wisdom (Ananta darshana, கடையிலா காட்சி), infinite power (Ananta labdhi, கடையிலா வீரியம்), infinite bliss (Ananta sukha, கடையிலா இன்பம்), without name (Akshaya sthiti, நாமமின்மை), without association to any caste (Being vitāraga, கோத்திரமின்மை), infinite life span (Being arupa, ஆயுள் இன்மை) and without any change (Aguruladhutaa, அழியா இயல்பு) is God.

The following table summarizes the eight supreme qualities of a liberated soul.

Quality	Meaning	Manifestation
Kśāyika samyaktva	infinite faith or belief in the tattvas or essential principles of reality	manifested on the destruction of the faith-deluding (darśana mohanīya) karma
Kevala Jnāna	infinite knowledge	on the destruction of the knowledge-obscuring (jnānāvarnīya) karma.
Kevaladarśana	infinite perception	on the destruction of the perception-obscuring (darśanāvarnīya) karma
Anantavīrya	infinite power	on the destruction of the obstructive (antarāya) karma
Sūksmatva	fineness	manifested on the destruction of the life- determining (āyuh) karma
Avagāhan	inter-penetrability	manifested on the destruction of the name-determining (nāma) karma
Agurulaghutva	literally, neither heavy nor light	manifested on the destruction of the status-determining (gotra) karma
Avyābādha	undisturbed, infinite bliss	manifested on the destruction of the feeling-producing (vedanīya) karma

Because of the quality of Sūksmatva, the liberated soul is beyond sense-perception and its knowledge of the substances is direct, without the use of the senses and the mind. The quality of avagāhan means that the liberated soul does not hinder the existence of other such souls in the same space.

A soul, after attaining siddhahood, goes to the top of the loka (as per Jain cosmology) and stays there for eternity.

== Hinduism ==
In Hinduism, the first usage of the term siddha occurs in the Maitreya Upanishad in chapter Adhya III where the writer of the section declares "I am Siddha."

=== Siddhashrama ===
In Hindu theology, Siddhashrama is a secret land deep in the Himalayas, where great yogis, sadhus, and sages who are siddhas live. The concept is similar to that of the Tibetan mystical land of Shambhala.

Siddhashrama is mentioned in many Indian epics and Puranas including theRamayana and Mahabharata. In Valmiki's Ramayana it is said that Viswamitra had his hermitage in Siddhashrama, the erstwhile hermitage of Vishnu, when he appeared as the Vamana avatar. He takes Rama and Lakshmana to Siddhashrama to exterminate the rakshasas who are disturbing his religious sacrifices (i.28.1-20).

=== Nath sampradaya ===
Whenever a siddha is mentioned, the 84 siddhas and the 9 nathas are remembered, and it is this tradition of the siddhas which is known as the Nath tradition. Siddha is a term used for both mahasiddhas and naths. Thus, a siddha may mean a siddha, a mahasiddha or a nath. The three words are used interchangeably.

==== In the Varna(na)ratnakara ====
A list of eighty-four siddhas is found in a manuscript (manuscript no. 48/34 of the Asiatic Society of Bengal) dated Lakshmana Samvat 388 (1506) which is part of a medieval Maithili work, the Varna Ratnakara (devnagari: वर्ण-रत्नाकर) written by Jyotirishwar Thakur, the court poet of King Harisimhadeva of Mithila (reigned 1300–1321). An interesting feature of this list is that the names of the most revered naths are incorporated into this list along with those of Buddhist siddhācāryas. The names of the siddhas found in this list are:

1. Minanātha
2. Gorakshanātha
3. Chauranginātha
4. Chāmarinātha
5. Tantipā
6. Hālipā
7. Kedāripā
8. Dhongapā
9. Dāripā
10. Virūpa
11. Kapāli
12. Kamāri
13. Kānha
14. Kanakhala
15. Mekhala
16. Unmana
17. Kāndali
18. Dhovi
19. Jālandhara
20. Tongi
21. Mavaha
22. Nāgārjuna
23. Dauli
24. Bhishāla
25. Achiti
26. Champaka
27. Dhentasa
28. Bhumbhari
29. Bākali
30. Tuji
31. Charpati
32. Bhāde
33. Chāndana
34. Kāmari
35. Karavat
36. Dharmapāpatanga
37. Bhadra
38. Pātalibhadra
39. Palihiha
40. Bhānu
41. Mina
42. Nirdaya
43. Savara
44. Sānti
45. Bhartrihari
46. Bhishana
47. Bhati
48. Gaganapā
49. Gamāra
50. Menurā
51. Kumāri
52. Jivana
53. Aghosādhava
54. Girivara
55. Siyāri
56. Nāgavāli
57. Bibhavat
58. Sāranga
59. Vivikadhaja
60. Magaradhwaja
61. Achita
62. Bichita
63. Nechaka
64. Chātala
65. Nāchana
66. Bhilo
67. Pāhila
68. Pāsala
69. Kamalakangāri
70. Chipila
71. Govinda
72. Bhima
73. Bhairava
74. Bhadra
75. Bhamari
76. Bhurukuti

==== In the Hatha Yoga Pradipika ====
In the first upadeśa (chapter) of the Hatha Yoga Pradipika, a 15th-century text, a list of yogis is found, who are described as the Mahasiddhas. This list has several names in common with the list found in the Varna(na)ratnākara:

1. Ādinātha
2. Matsyendra
3. Śāvara
4. Ānandabhairava
5. Chaurangi
6. Minanātha
7. Gorakṣanātha
8. Virupākṣa
9. Bileśaya
10. Manthāna
11. Bhairava
12. Siddhibuddha
13. Kanthaḍi
14. Koraṃṭaka
15. Surānanda
16. Siddhapāda
17. Charpaṭi
18. Kānerī
19. Pūjyapāda
20. Nityanātha
21. Nirañjana
22. Kapālī
23. Bindunātha
24. Kākachaṇḍīśvarā
25. Allāma
26. Prabhudeva
27. Ghoḍā
28. Chholī
29. Ṭiṃṭiṇi
30. Bhānukī
31. Nāradeva
32. Khaṇḍakāpālika

=== Tamil tradition ===
In Tamil Nadu, South India, a siddha (see siddhar) refers to a being who has achieved a high degree of physical as well as spiritual perfection or enlightenment. The ultimate demonstration of this is that siddhas allegedly attained physical immortality. Thus siddha, like siddhar, refers to a person who has realised the goal of a type of sadhana and become a perfected being. In Tamil Nadu, South India, where the siddha tradition is still practiced, special individuals are recognized as and called siddhas (or siddhars or cittars) who are on the path to that assumed perfection after they have taken special secret rasayanas to perfect their bodies, in order to be able to sustain prolonged meditation along with a form of pranayama which considerably reduces the number of breaths they take. Siddha were said to have special powers including flight. These eight powers are collectively known as attamasiddhigal (ashtasiddhi). In Hindu cosmology, Siddhaloka is a subtle world (loka) where perfected beings (siddhas) take birth. They are endowed with the eight primary siddhis at birth.

== Buddhism ==
The Svetasvatara (II.12) presupposes a siddha body.

== See also ==
- Kagapujandar
- Religion in ancient Tamil country
- Twilight language
