= Jainism in Bengal =

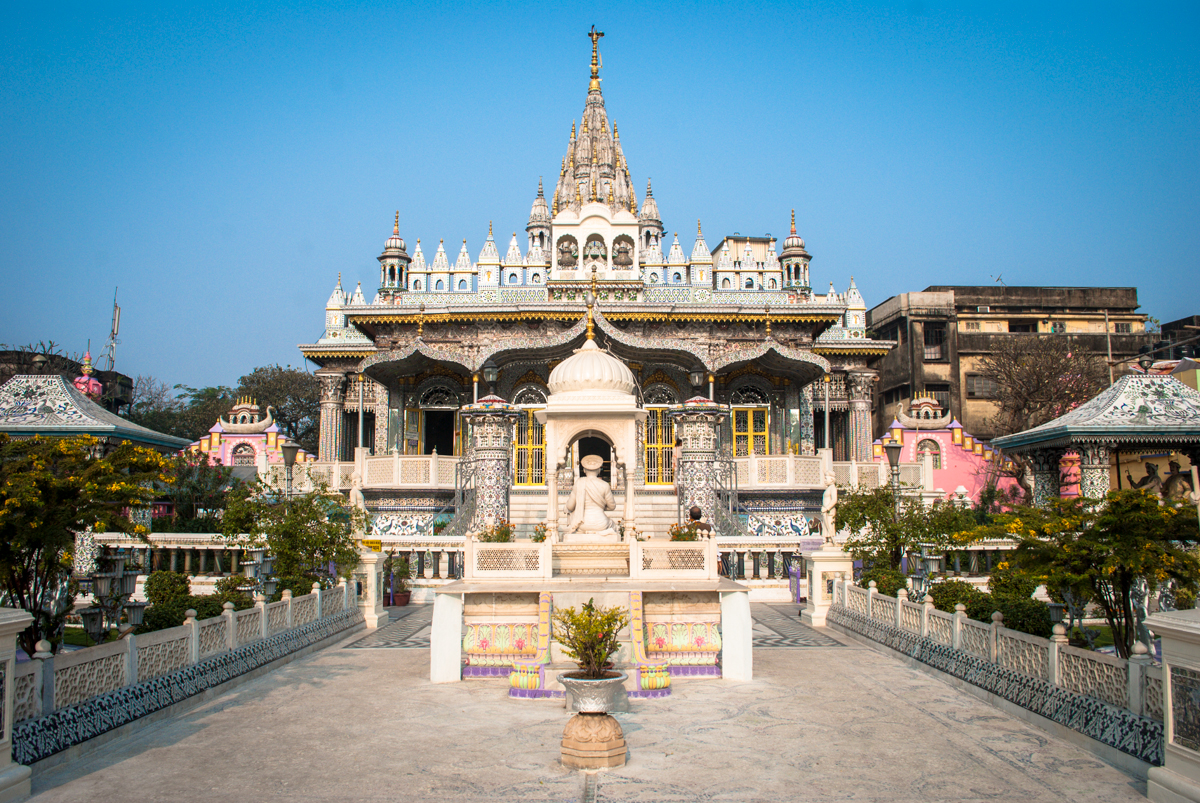
The Calcutta Jain Temple

Archaeological evidence shows Jainism was a significant religion in Bengal region during the early historic period.

== History ==
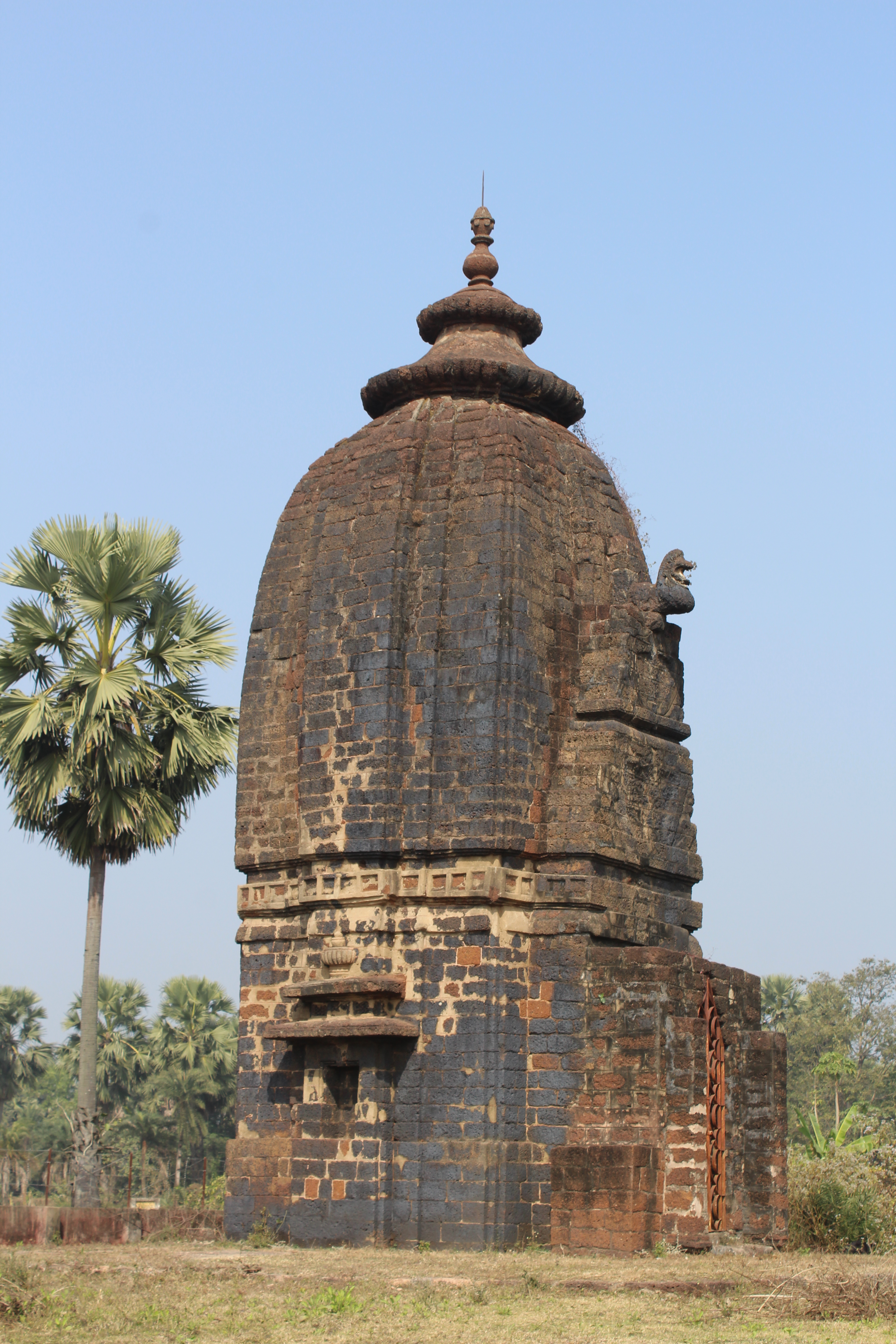
13th century Parshvanatha temple, Deulbhira

=== Ancient period ===
Jain ideology in ancient Bengal developed in two main phases: an early period (pre-Mauryan to 7th–8th century CE) and a later phase (post-Gupta to 13th century CE) marked by the emergence of local rulers. Early references to Jainism in Bengal include the 4th-century BCE Hatigumpha inscription, where King Khāravela of Kalinga, a Jain devotee, retrieved a Jina image taken by a Nanda ruler of Gangaridai, indicating possible Jain influence in the region.

Buddhist texts like the Divyavadana suggest Jainism's presence in Pundravardhana (modern Mahasthangarh, Bangladesh) by the time of Ashoka. Additionally, the Bṛhatkathākośa recounts that Jain preceptor Bhadrabahu, associated with Sthulabhadra, was born in North Bengal, implying Jainism's roots in the area. The Kalpa Sutra mentions Bhadrabahu's disciple, Godasa, who established branches in Tāmralipta, Koṭivarṣa, and Puṇḍravardhana—regions that served as early Jain centers in Bengal.

Archaeological finds such as a Jain terracotta plaque from Murshidabad (Maurya-Sunga period) and an inscription from Mathura (150 CE) referencing a Jain monk from Rāḍha suggest a well-established Jain presence by the 1st century CE. Discoveries like the terracotta figure of Naigamesha in Burdwan further indicate Jainism's integration into local folk practices during the Kuṣāṇa period.

By the early medieval era, Jainism likely persisted in areas like Kumariparvata, supported by regional monastic movements, particularly from the Tāmraliptikā branch.

=== Gupta period ===
The next substantial evidence for the spread of Jainism in ancient Bengal is a copper-plate grant dated Gupta Era year 159 (479 CE), found at Paharpur in Rajshahi, Bangladesh. Known primarily for its Pāla Buddhist monastery, this inscription marks the earliest archaeological Jain record in Bengal during the Gupta period (Dikshit, 1983). It documents an endowment by a Brahmin couple, Nāthaśarman and his wife Rāmī, who donated lands for the worship of Arhats at the Vaṭa-Gōhālī vihāra, overseen by disciples of the Nirgrantha Śramaṇācārya Guhanadin from the pañchastūpa section of Kāśi.

The Vaṭa-Gōhālī vihāra likely corresponds to the present-day site of Paharpur. Despite limited Jain artefacts, the donation by a Brahmin couple for Jain worship illustrates notable religious tolerance in the region. The inscription implies Guhanadin's discipleship lineage and indicates his activity around the late 4th century CE, placing the foundation of the vihāra about 50 years prior.

The term pañchastūpa (five-stupa) sect is referenced in Digambara literature; eminent monks such as Virasena and Jinasena were part of this sect. Harishena's Bṛhatkathākośa records the establishment of five stūpas at Mathura, suggesting an early Digambara presence that possibly spread to Bengal. Other records from the period, such as the Jagadishpur copper plate (448 CE), further illustrate Jain influence.

The Jagadishpur plate, acquired by the Varendra Research Museum in 1961, confirms land grants for the Mecikāmra siddhāyatana in Puṇḍravardhana and affiliated Jain religious structures. This siddhāyatana, potentially a Jain establishment, suggests North Bengal's Jain presence during the Gupta period, with donations from agrarian families. Together with records from Nāthaśarman and Rāmī's donation, these findings underscore Jainism's significant reach and support among diverse social classes in Bengal.

Earlier scholars believed (Gupta, 1993–94) that Jainism nearly disappeared from ancient Bengal after the seventh century CE, with Xuanzang’s travel account being the last evidence of its popularity. However, recent discoveries confirm that Jainism persisted and flourished in the Rāḍha region of Bengal up to the twelfth or thirteenth century CE.

Xuanzang's account, from around 638 CE, indicates that Jainism retained a stronghold in Bengal during the seventh century, describing it as the dominant faith in two prominent regions: Pundravardhana in the north and Samatata in southeastern Bengal.

Regarding Pundravardhana and Samatata, Xuanzang observed:

There were twenty Buddhist Monasteries and above 3000 Brethren by whom the “Great and Little Vehicles” were followed: the Deva Temples were 100 in number, and the followers of the various sects lived pell-mell, the Digambara Nirgranths being very numerous.

For Samatata, Xuanzang noted:

It had more than 30 Buddhist Monasteries… There were 100 Deva Temples, the various sects lived pell-mell, and the Digambara Nirgranthas were very numerous.

Based on Xuanzang's descriptions, it can be inferred that during the post-Gupta period, Digambara Jain Nirgranths were more numerous than followers of Buddhism and Brahmanical ideologies in both northern and southeastern Bengal. This prominence suggests that Jainism continued to thrive in Bengal, possibly due to sustained support from the Pundravardhanīya and Tāmraliptika Śākhās.

=== Early medieval period ===
Jainism was gradually overshadowed by the Vajrayana Buddhist influence in the Pāla strongholds of North Bengal, parts of Bihar, and the Samatata region. Without royal patronage and faced with strong Brahmanical and Buddhist religious currents, Jainism struggled to thrive independently. However, it did survive, particularly in the upland areas of Western Bengal, likely due to the support of the trading community.

The Dudhpani inscription, found in Hazaribagh district, Jharkhand, mentions merchants travelling from Ayodhya to Tamralipta and is dated paleographically to about the eighth century CE. Field surveys have also documented inscribed Jain images in Purulia, Bankura, and Burdwan districts. These inscriptions refer to donors and are dated to the ninth/tenth through twelfth/thirteenth centuries CE, suggesting sponsorship by the Jain mercantile community.

Unfortunately, no Pāla or Sena period epigraphic records from northern Bengal have been discovered to detail Jainism's spread. However, the Bangarh inscription from the reign of Nayapala (c. 1042–58 CE) indirectly refers to Jain monks in the Bangarh region. The inscription praises a Śaiva teacher, Guru Murtisiva, who defeated Jain Digambara ascetics in religious debates:

śaśvat-pīta-digamva(mba)r-ārtha-viraha-bhrāntiṃ tiraskurvvatī kṛṣṇ-ādvaita-kathān-nirasya va(ba) huśo vṛddher abhāvaṃ guṇe

This indicates that Jainism persisted, albeit with diminished influence, in parts of Bengal and that Śaiva teachers competed with them to establish dominance.

Fieldwork reveals that from the eighth or ninth century onward, Jainism reached its peak in the plateau region of ancient Bengal, particularly in Rāḍha (zones I & III). Isolated, resource-rich, and conducive to non-farming activities, this region likely drew Jain communities, whose members were involved in local trade and resource extraction. The area's archaeological wealth—temple complexes, sculptures, and architectural remains—suggests it was a thriving Jain center up to the thirteenth century CE.

Western Bengal's plateau region, known for its sparse forest cover and deposits of metals and minerals, may have been attractive to Jains, locally known as Saraks, for its economic potential. Local traditions of ironworking among tribes like the Bhumij and Asura likely supplemented Jain mercantile interests in resource procurement and trade.

Notably, Beglar describes trade routes connecting Tamluk with Patna and other regions, facilitating the movement of Jain merchants. He writes:

There would be a choice of several routes to Patna, the most direct route would be through Bishnupur, Bahulara, Sonatapan, Ekteswar, Chatna, Raghunathpur, Telkuppi, Jharia, Rajauli, and Rajgir. … At every great obstacle, large cities sprang up, as attested by the remains about Ghatal, Bishnupur, Telkuppi, and near Rajauli.

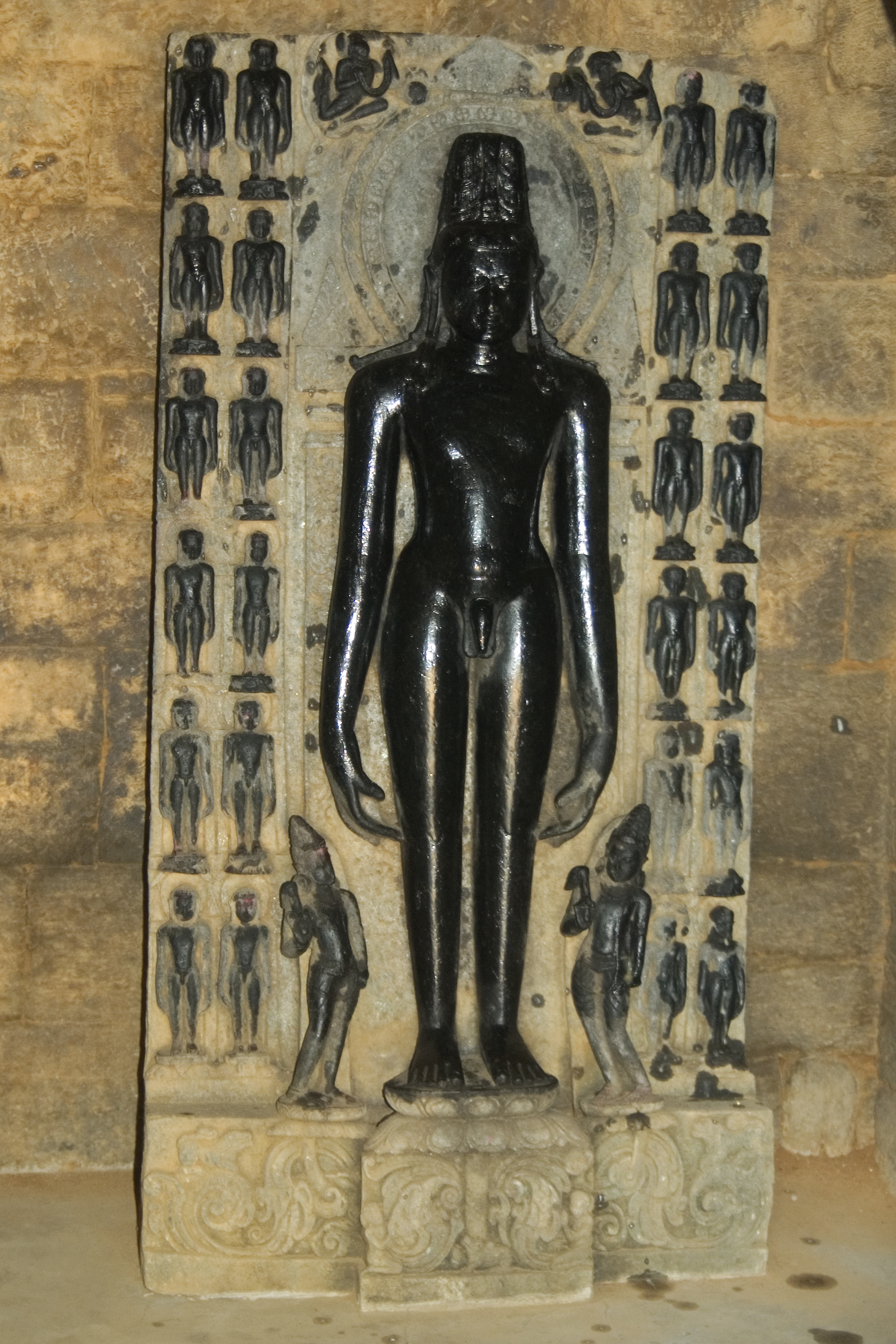
Statue of Rishabhanatha at Pakbirra Jain temple, Purulia. ca. 9th century

Jain sculptures with inscriptions in localised Gauḍī script have also been found, reflecting local patronage and recording the names of donors, such as “dānapati Śakalamagana” on a Tīrthaṅkara Ṛṣabhanātha image from Bhabanipur in Purulia, and “dānapati Sanadeva” on a Tīrthaṅkara Pārśvanātha image from Tumba. These inscriptions, though often in corrupt Sanskrit, document Jain patronage in the region.

One noteworthy early medieval Jain saint, Somadeva, author of the Yaśastilakacampū, was originally from Bengal and mentions a Jain shrine at Tamralipta in his writings. Further association of Jainism with Bengal appears in the Vasantavilasa by Balachandra Suri (thirteenth century CE), which notes visits to Jain temples in Ladha, Gauda, and other regions.

Jainism, thus, remained a major religious ideology in eastern India from the eighth century CE onwards. This is evident from the archaeological distribution of Jain sites and sculptural remains, especially across modern-day West Bengal.

=== 18th century to present ===
Jainism was wiped out from Bengal alongside Vajrayana, following Bakhtiyar Khalji's invasion of Bengal in 1204, which heralded the beginning of Islamic rule in the region. However, Jainism saw a resurgence in the state following Mughal conquest, caused by migration of rich Jain merchant communities from Rajasthan and other parts of India to Dhaka, the provincial capital of Bengal Subah and Sonargaon, the commercial river-port situated nearby in order to pursue commercial interests. The most consequential among these Jain immigrants was the Jagat Seth family. The Nawabs of Bengal came to be increasingly dependent on the banking network of the Jagat Seths to pay revenues to the increasingly weakening Mughal emperor in Delhi. Around 1700s, Murshid Quli Khan, under the influence of Jagat Seth Manikchand, shifted the seat of power from Dhaka to Murshidabad, significantly close to the Jain pilgrimage site of Sammed Shikhar, in order to tackle the Maratha incursions. This resulted in creation of Jain diaspora communities in Murshidabad & the surrounding city of Jiaganj-Azimganj. After the establishment of British rule in India, Jain merchants from Marwari & Gujarati communities migrated to Kolkata to avail better financial opportunities.

== Communities ==
=== Sarak ===
Saraks are a Bengali Jain caste found in West Bengal, Jharkhand, Odisha, Bihar, Assam and Bangladesh. They have been followers of Jainism since ancient times; however, they were isolated and the Jain community in western, northern and southern India.

According to Ramesh Chandra Majumder, the Jain scholar Bhadrabahu, the second Louhacharya and the author of Kalpa Sutra may have come from the Sarak community. The Saraks were agriculturists and moneylenders having landed properties.

They have continued to remain vegetarian even though this practice is uncommon among other communities in the region. Saraks have Parshva as a favoured patron and recite the Ṇamōkāra mantra. The 24th Tirthankara Mahavira visited this region according to the Kalpa Sūtra.

The Saraks lost contact with Jains in the rest of India after its conquest by Ikhtiyar Uddin Muhammad bin Bakhtiyar Khilji. Contact with the Digambara Bundelkhand Jains was reestablished when the Parwars Manju Chaudhary (1720–1785) was appointed the governor of Cuttack by the Maratha Empire.

In 2009, more than 165 Sarak Jains living in parts of West Bengal, Bihar and Jharkhand visited the ancient Jain pilgrimage center of Shravanabelagola. A special function to welcome the Sarak Jains was organised at Shravanabelagola.

=== Sheherwali Jains of Murshidabad ===
Owing to the influency of the Swetambar Jain Jagat Seth family in the economy and internal politics of 18th century Bengal, five Oswal Jain merchant families - Nahars, Dudhorias, Naulakhas, Dugars, Kotharis from what is now modern Rajasthan migrated and settled down in the cities of Murshidabad and Jiaganj-Azimganj. By 1901, their numbers had grown up to 998. Sheherwali (meaning 'city dweller') Jains have adapted certain Bengali Hindu customs while maintaining their own distinct identity. These Jains conducted trade in silk, muslin & ivory alongside banking & owned palatial mansions like Kathgola Palace. One such Jain member, Bijoy Singh Nahar, worked up the ranks of the state Indian National Congress to become West Bengal's Deputy Chief Minister under Ajoy Mukherjee in 1971.

=== Johari Seth Jains of Kolkata ===
Following the Battle of Plassey, the centre of political power in Bengal shifted away from Murshidabad to Calcutta. This caused many Sheherwali Jains to migrate to the city. The conquest of Oudh brought Shrimal Jains from Lucknow to the city, alongside many more Oswal Jains from Marwar, all of whom settled down in the city's northern part. Here they made fortunes in mercantile activities, & most notably in jewellery business, hence came to be known as Johari Seth (Johari meaning 'jeweller', a title supposedly bestowed by Lord Mayo to a Jain merchant Badridas Mukhim & Seth meaning 'merchant'). The opulence of the Johari Seth Jain community is testified by the Calcutta Jain temple. The Johari Seth Jain community was a big support-base of the Hindu Mahasabha, with one member Padmaraj Jain, being its provincial secretary. Similar to Subhashchandra Bose, Padmaraj Jain had also tried to establish correspondence with Nazi German authorities in an attempt to gain their support against the colonial British authorities (see Indian Legion). After independence, they have been strongly anti-communist in a state which had been ruled by communists for 34 years & has voted for the BJP since 1991.

== Demographics ==
=== Population by district ===
Most of the Bengali Jains now live in the Indian state of West Bengal.

Jains in West Bengal by district (2011)
| # | District | Total population | Jain population | % |
|---|---|---|---|---|
| 1 | Kolkata | 4,496,694 | 21,178 | 0.47% |
| 2 | Howrah | 4,850,029 | 9,699 | 0.20% |
| 3 | North 24 Parganas | 10,009,781 | 4,452 | 0.04% |
| 4 | Puruliya | 2,930,115 | 3,052 | 0.10% |
| 5 | Murshidabad | 7,103,807 | 3,037 | 0.04% |
| 6 | Bankura | 3,596,674 | 2,904 | 0.08% |
| 7 | Hugli | 5,519,145 | 2,160 | 0.04% |
| 8 | Koch Bihar | 2,819,086 | 1,869 | 0.07% |
| 9 | Darjiling | 1,846,823 | 1,840 | 0.10% |
| 10 | Barddhaman | 7,717,563 | 1,674 | 0.02% |
| 11 | Paschim Medinipur | 5,913,457 | 1,550 | 0.03% |
| 12 | Jalpaiguri | 3,872,846 | 1,461 | 0.04% |
| 13 | Uttar Dinajpur | 3,007,134 | 1,324 | 0.04% |
| 14 | Birbhum | 3,502,404 | 1,152 | 0.03% |
| 15 | South 24 Parganas | 8,161,961 | 972 | 0.01% |
| 16 | Maldah | 3,988,845 | 639 | 0.02% |
| 17 | Purba Medinipur | 5,095,875 | 574 | 0.01% |
| 18 | Dakshin Dinajpur | 1,676,276 | 323 | 0.02% |
| 19 | Nadia | 5,167,600 | 281 | 0.01% |
| | West Bengal (Total) | 91,276,115 | 60,141 | 0.07% |

=== Trends ===
Trends in Jain population of West Bengal
| Census year | % of total population |
|---|---|
| 1951 | 0.08% |
| 1961 | 0.08% |
| 1971 | 0.07% |
| 1981 | 0.07% |
| 1991 | 0.05% |
| 2001 | 0.07% |
| 2011 | 0.06% |

== Temples ==
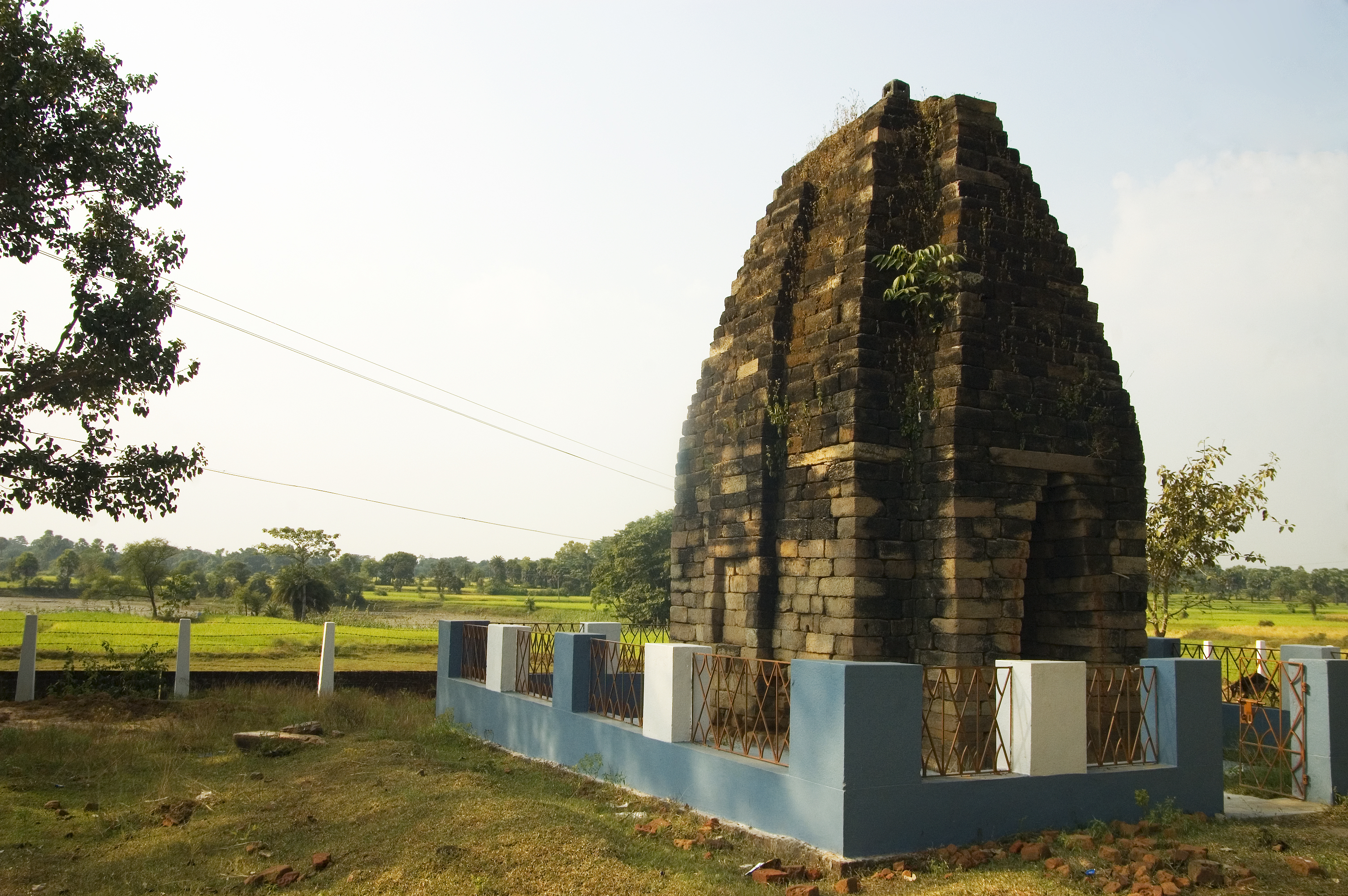
Pakbirra Jain temples, Purulia

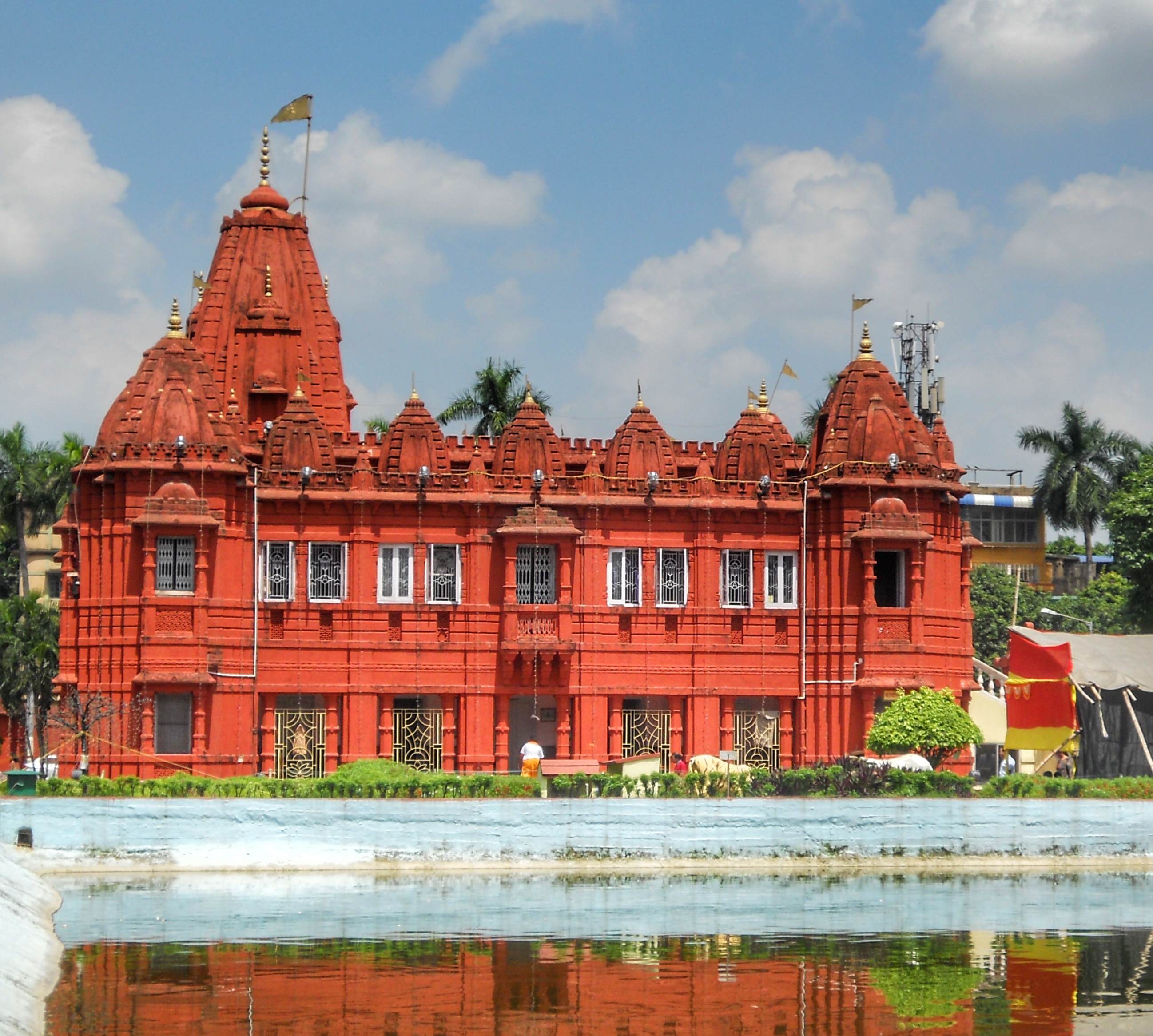
Belgachhia Pareshnath Mandir

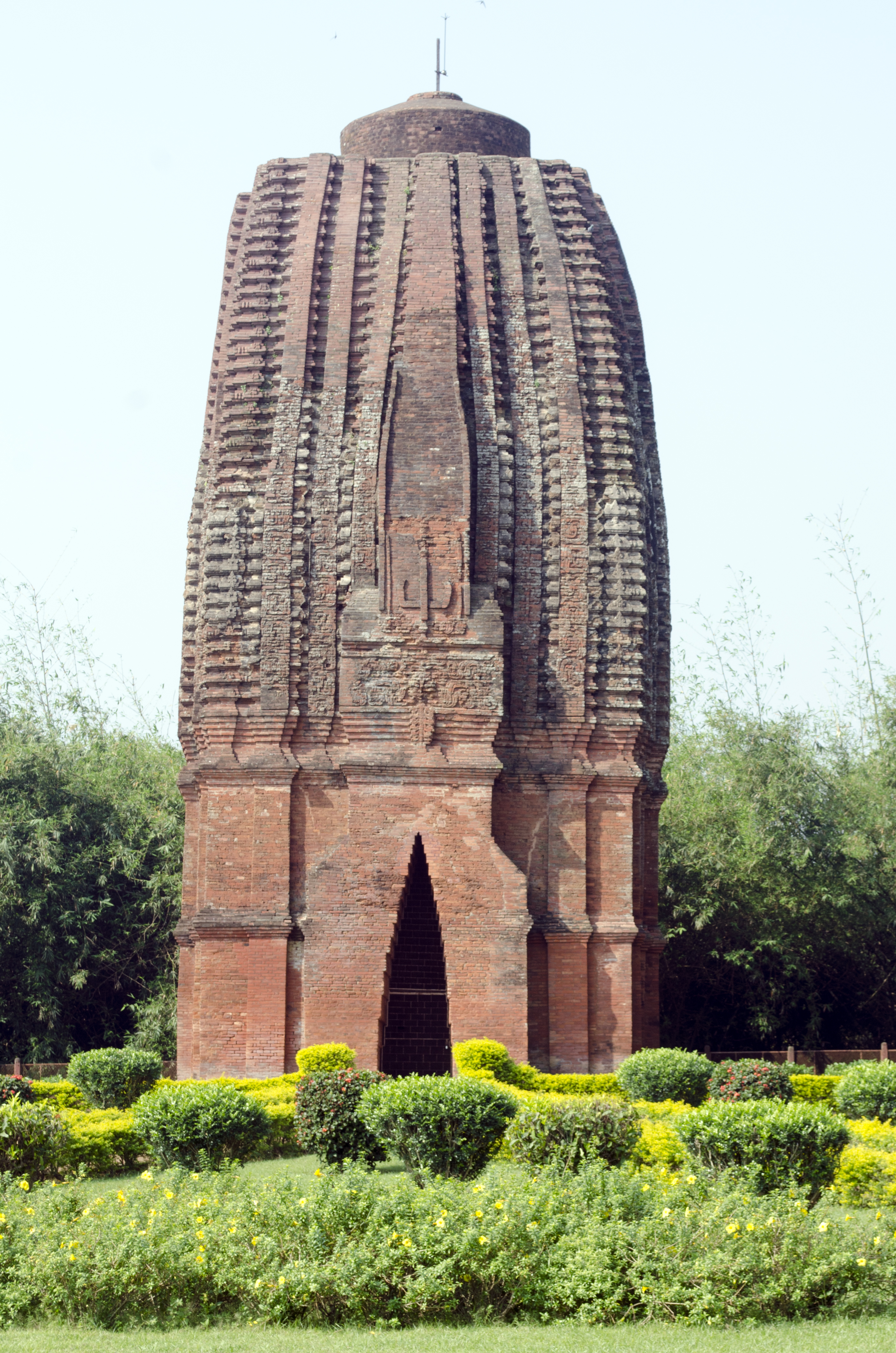
Sat Deul, Deulia

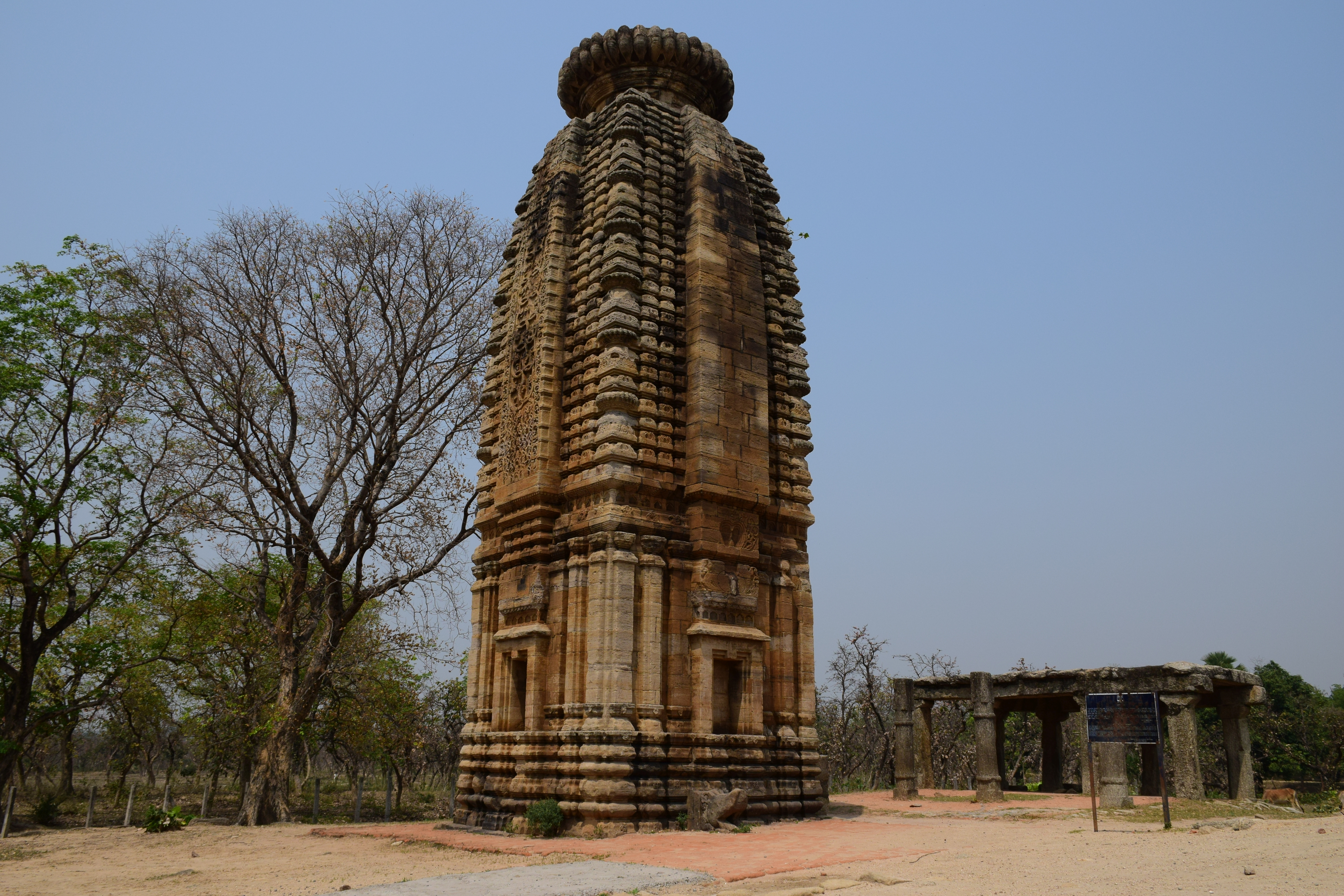
Banda Deul

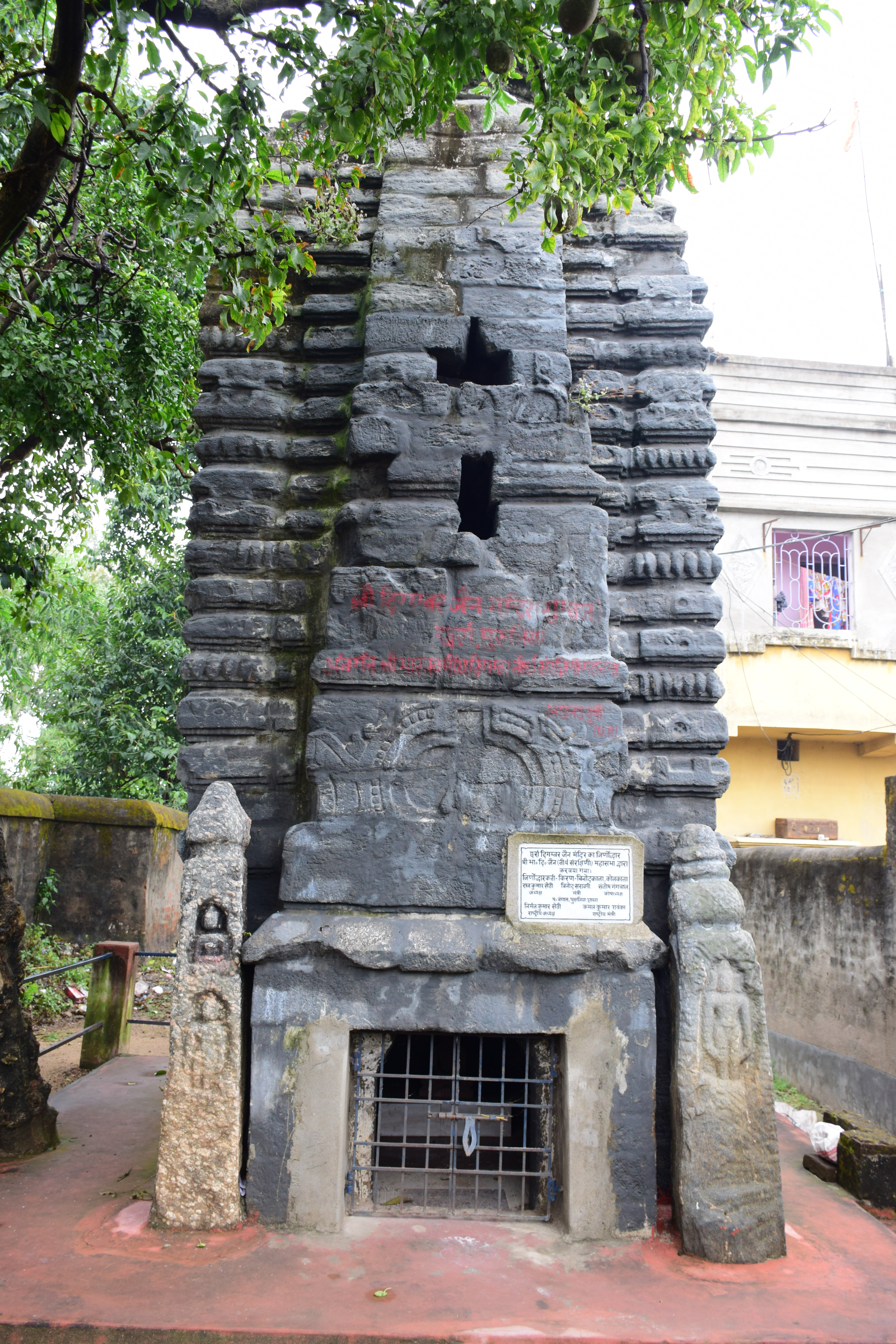
Deul at Charara

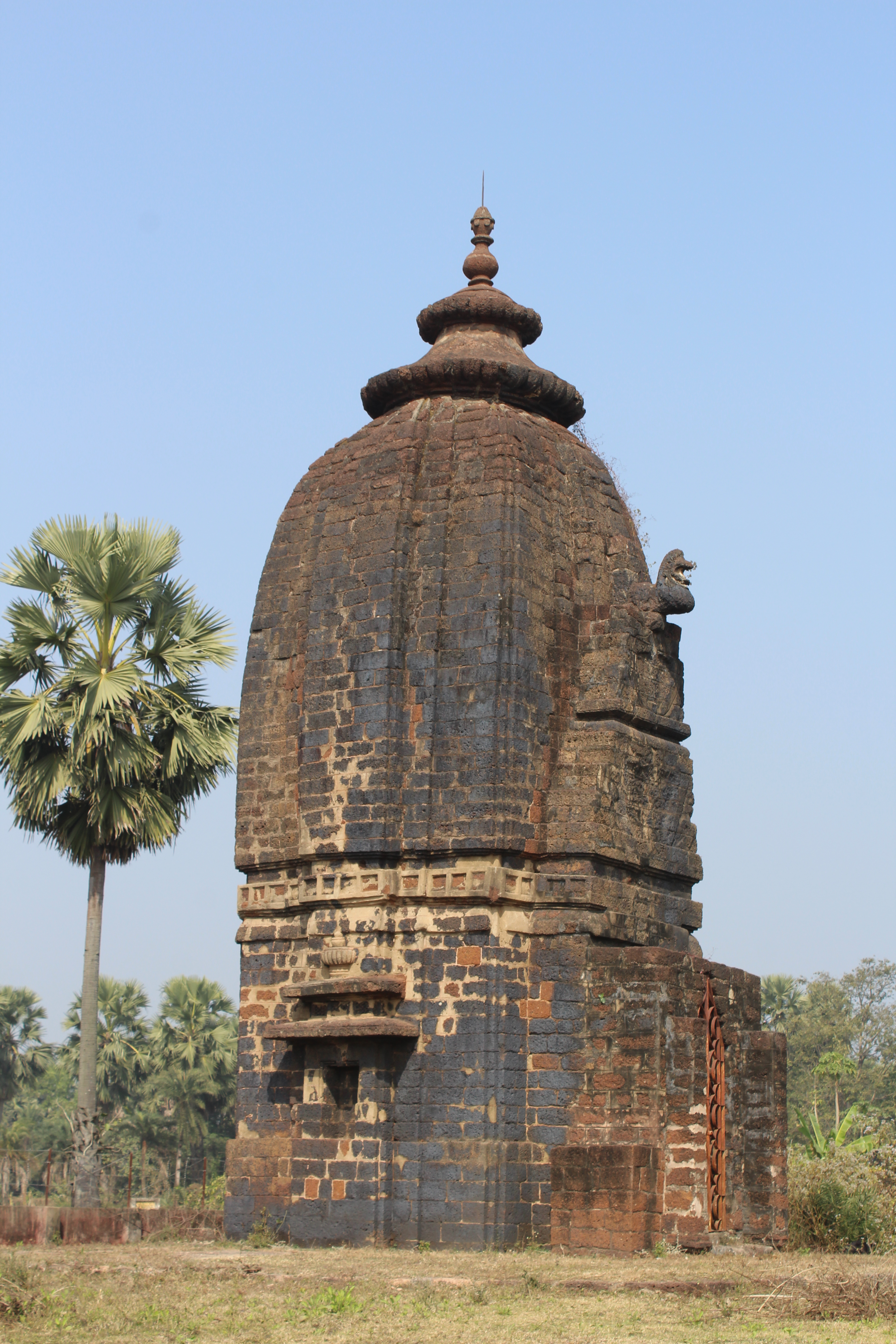
Parshvanatha temple, Deulbhira

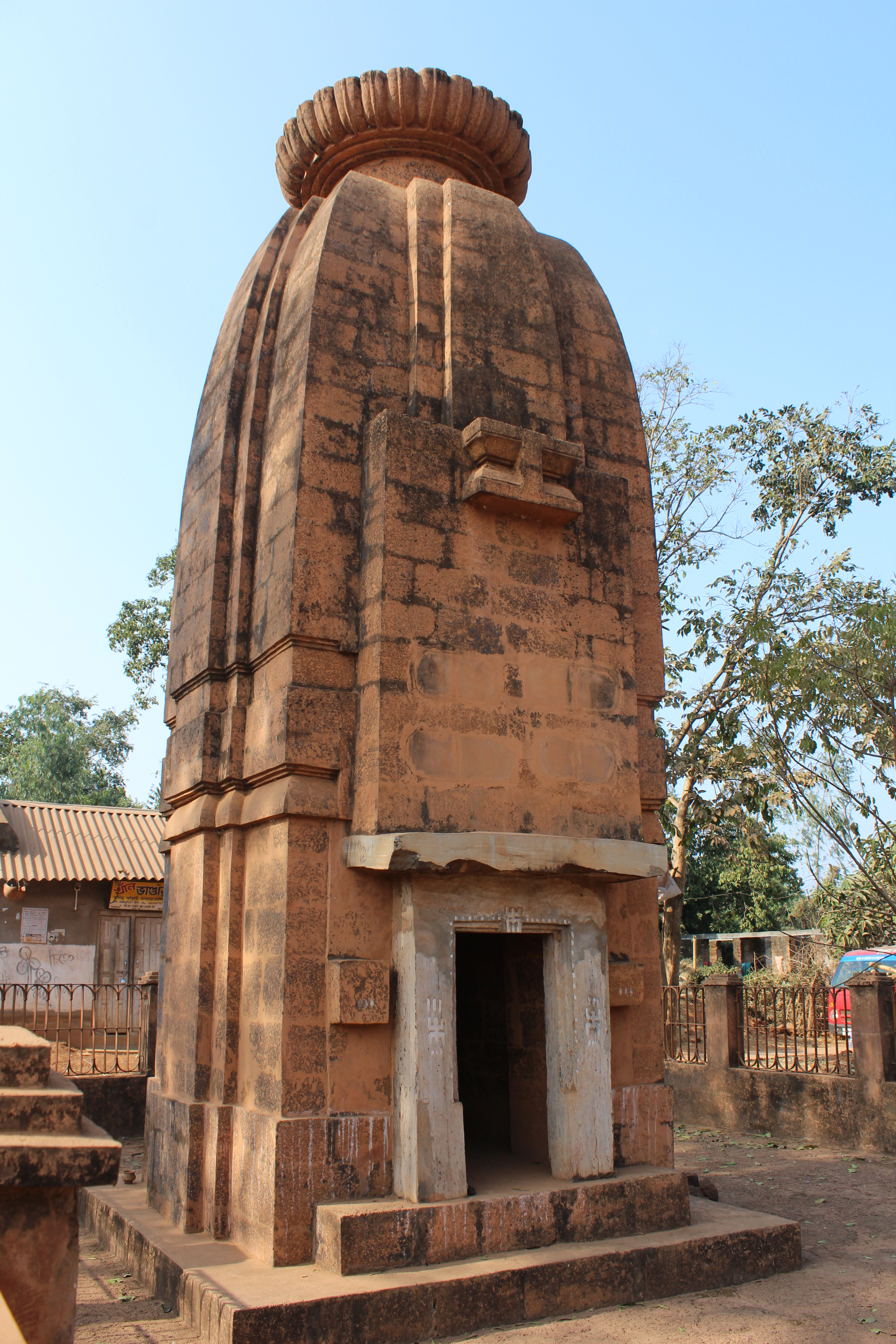
Harmasra Jain temple

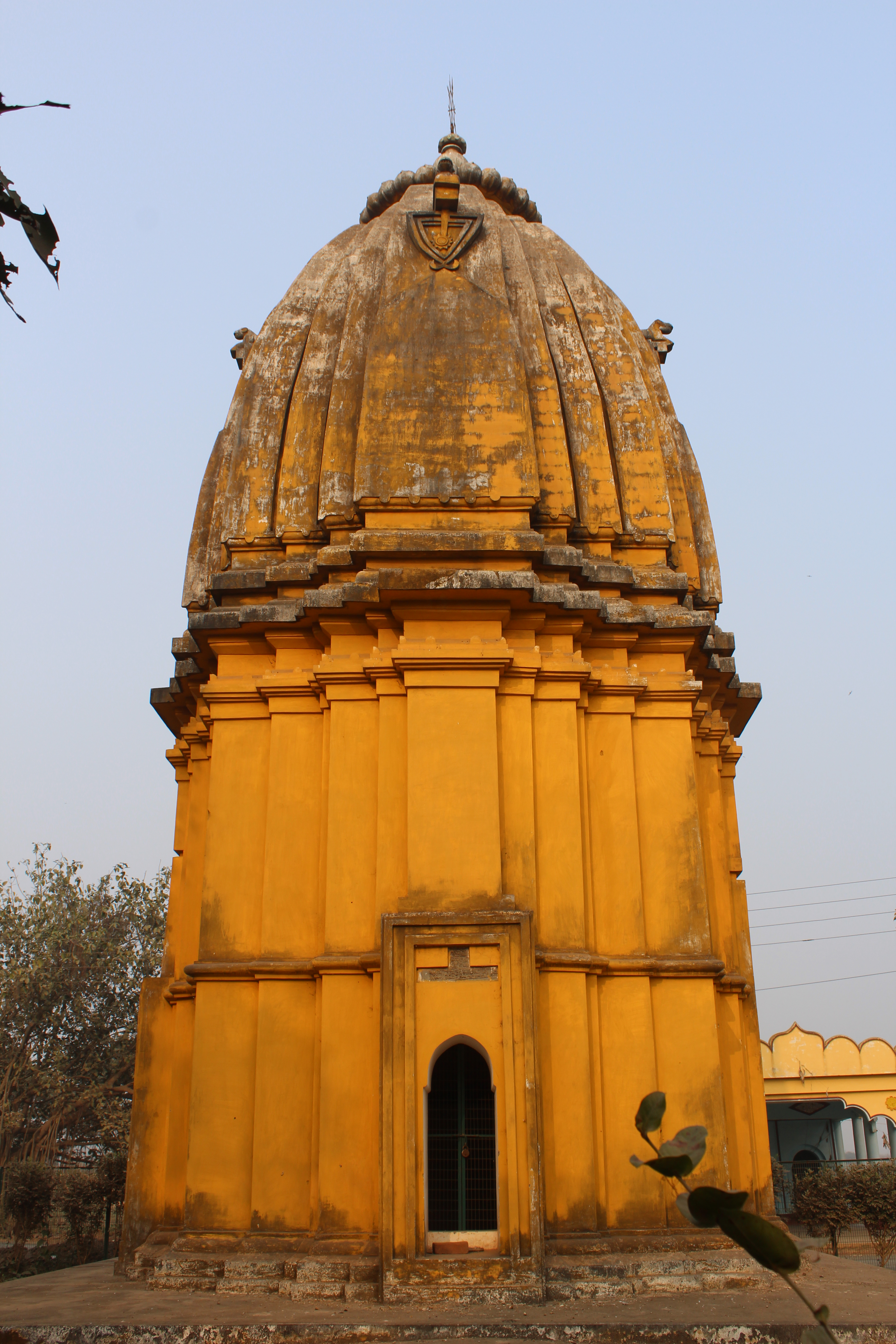
Deul at Dharapat

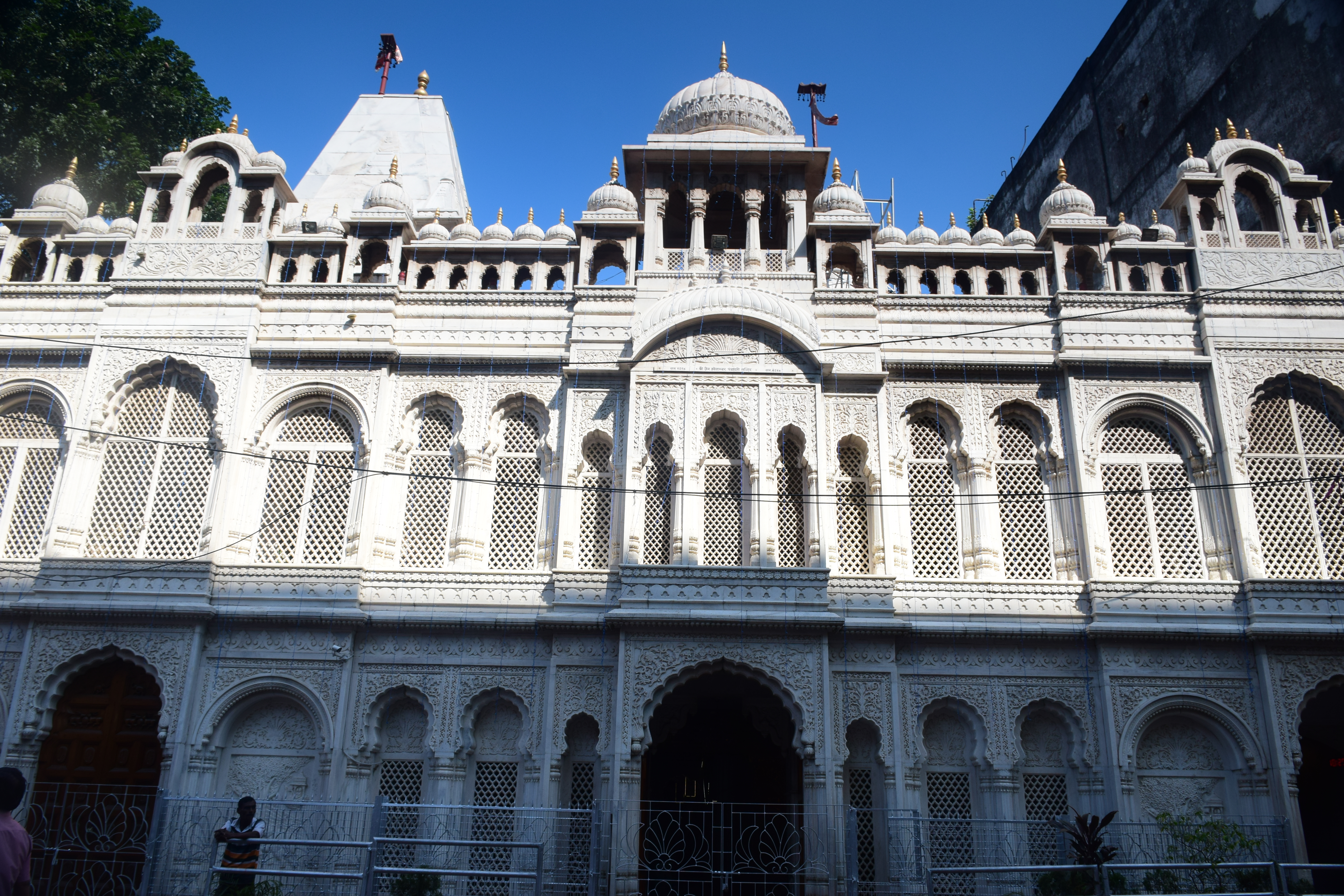
Panchayati Temple, Bara Bazar
- Calcutta Jain Temple
- Pakbirra Jain temples
- Kathgola Adinath Temple
- Shree Digambar Jain Pareswanath Temple, Belgachia
- Sat Deul
- Harmasra Jain temple
- Banda Deul
- Bahulara Ancient Temple
- Deulbhira Jain Temple

== See also ==
- Jain community
- Sarak people
- Basudih
- Jainism in Bangladesh
- Religion in India
- Religion in West Bengal
- Religion in Bangladesh
