= Sarak people =

Bengali Jain ethnic group in the Indian subcontinent

Sarak
সরাক
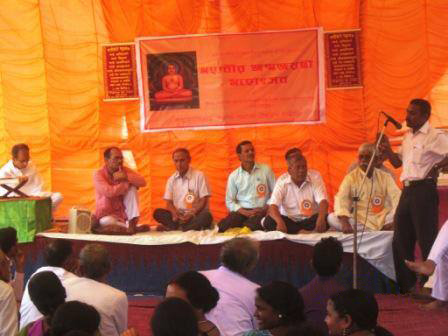
- Sarak Jains celebrating Mahavir Jayanti

Total population
- 34,000-50,000

Regions with significant populations
- West Bengal: 25,000-35,000
- Jharkhand: 5,000-10,000

Languages
- Bengali, Hindi

Religion
- Jainism

Saraks (from Sanskrit Śrāvaka) are a Jain caste, found in West Bengal, Jharkhand and parts of Odisha. They have been followers of Jainism, such as vegetarianism, since ancient times, however, were isolated and separated from the main body of the Jain community in western, northern, and southern India and have been Jain Bengalis ever since. The governments of India and West Bengal both have classified some of the Saraks under Other Backward Classes since 1994 but many of them have been in the General category from the beginning itself.

== History ==
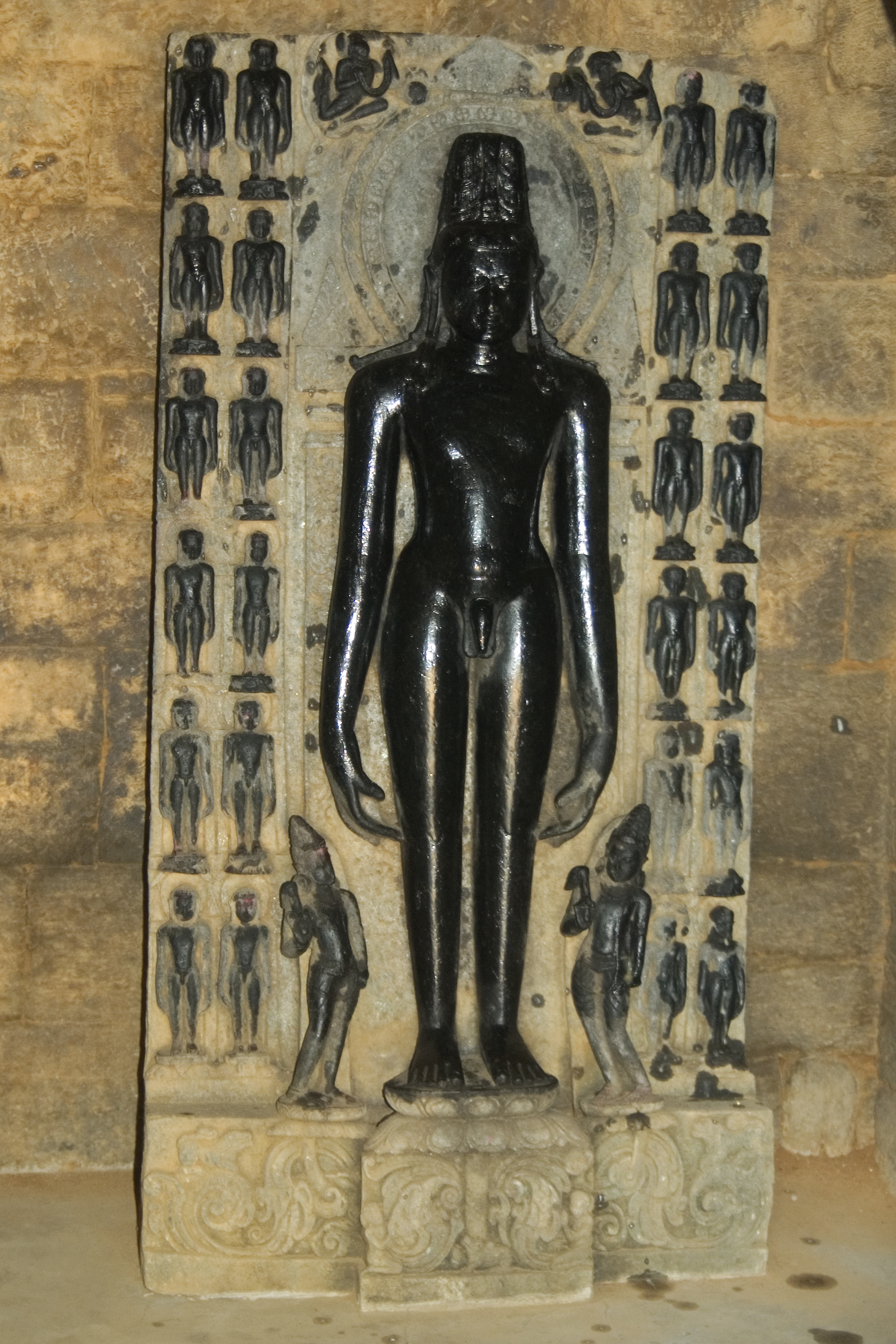
Lord Adinatha at Pakbirra

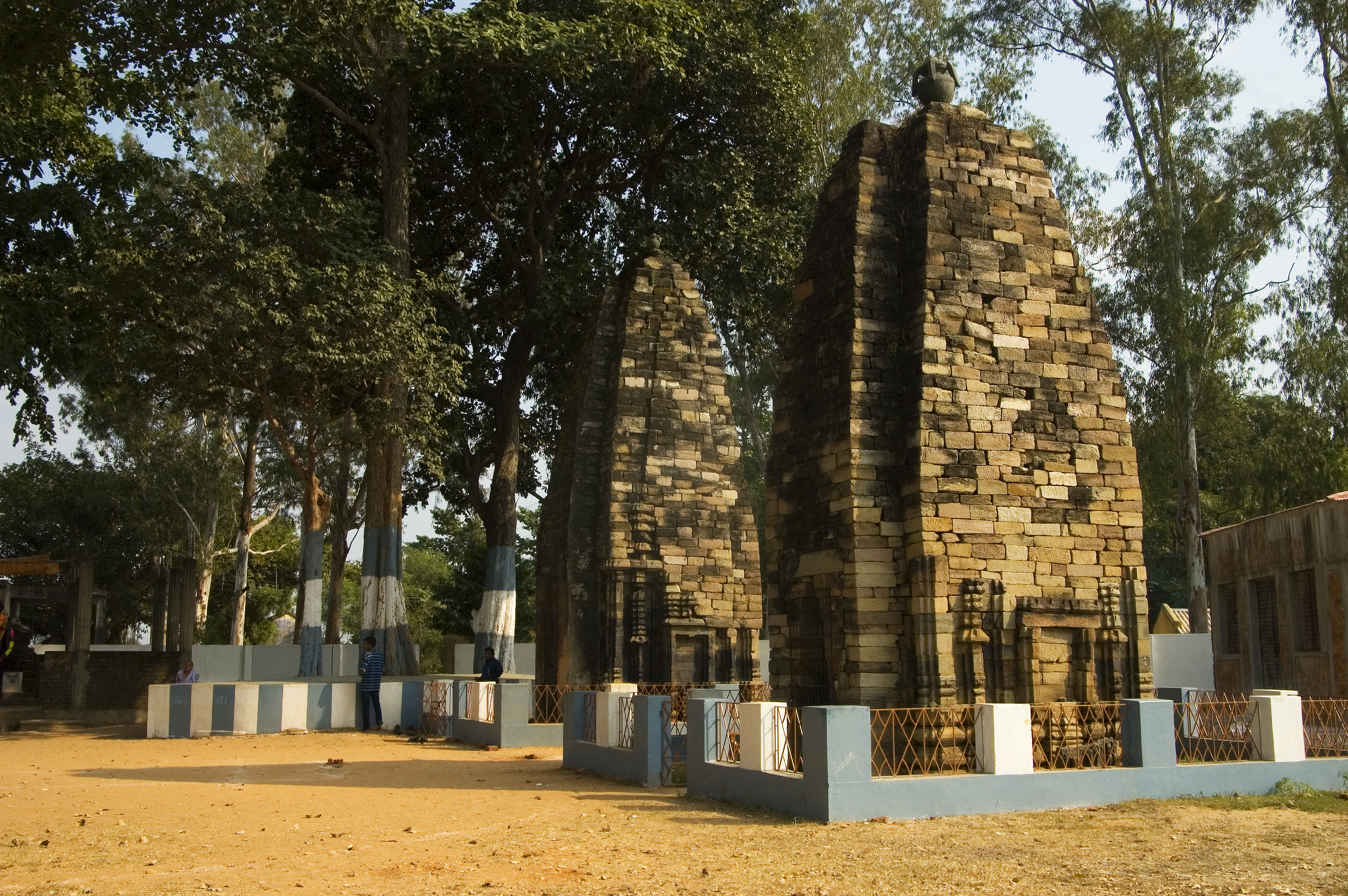
Pakbirra Jain temples, Purulia

The Saraks are an ancient community in Jharkhand and Bengal. British anthropologist Edward Tuite Dalton noted that according to the Bhumij tradition in Singhbhum district, the Saraks were early settlers in the region. According to Santosh Kumar Kundu, the Saraks arrived from the northwestern region of India, presently in Gujarat and Uttar Pradesh. In the region between the rivers Barakar and Damodar, two democratic republics, Shikharbhum and Panchakot, flourished. Later they merged and came to be known as Shikharbhum, with the capital at Panchkot. According to Ramesh Chandra Majumder, the Jain scholar Bhadrabahu, the second Louhacharya and the author of Kalpa Sutra may have come from the Sarak community.

The region is called Vajjabhumi in ancient texts because diamonds were once mined in the region. The Tirthankara Mahavira visited this region according to the Kalpa Sūtra.

== Separation and rediscovery ==
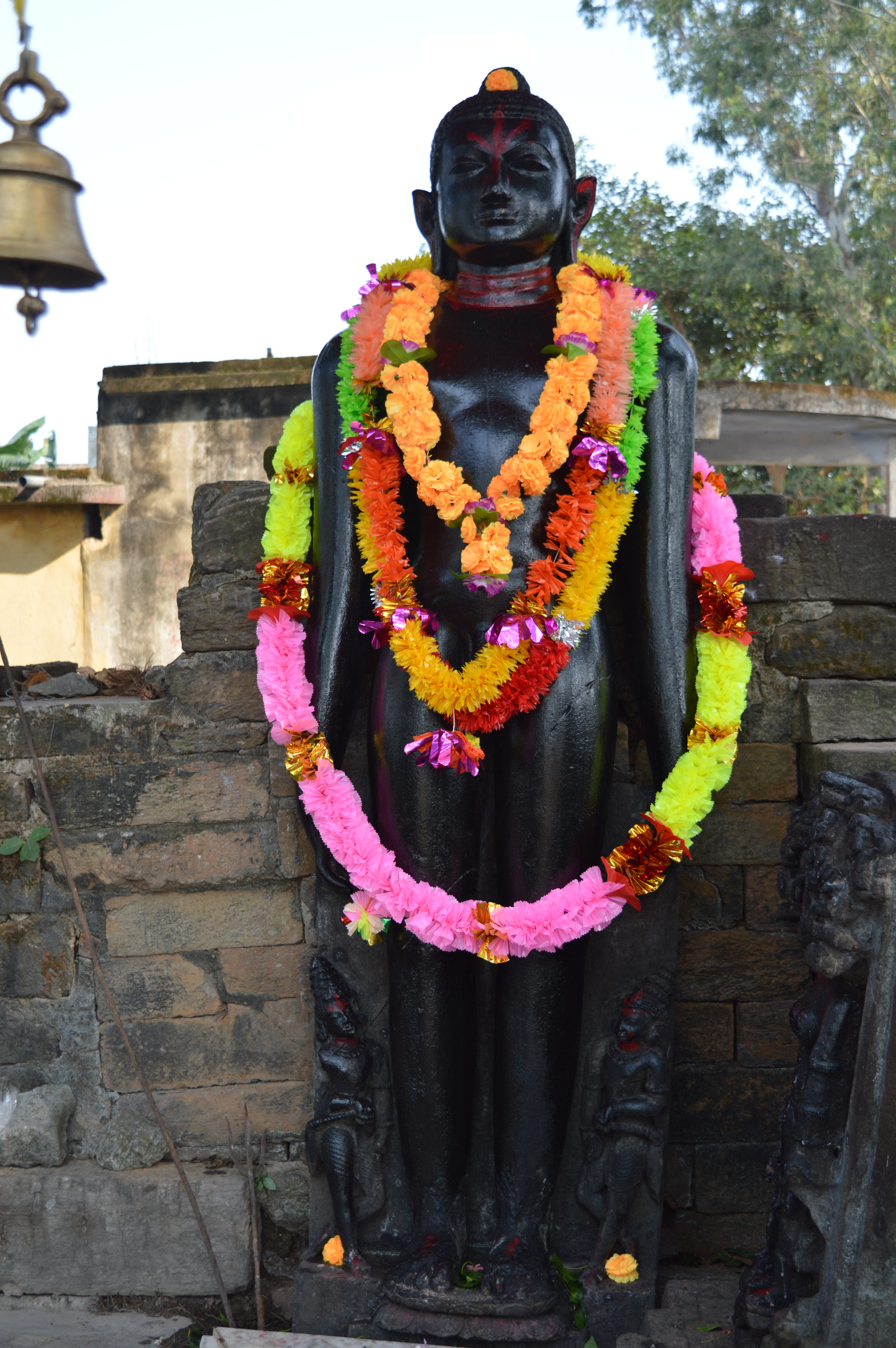
7.5 feet statue of Shitalanatha, Purulia

The Saraks lost contact with Jains in the rest of India after its conquest by Ikhtiyar Uddin Muhammad bin Bakhtiyar Khilji. Contact with the Digambara Bundelkhand Jains was reestablished when the Parwars Manju Chaudhary (1720–1785) was appointed the governor of Cuttack by the Maratha Empire.

Saraks are concentrated in Purulia, Bankura and Burdwan districts of West Bengal and Ranchi, Dumka and Giridih districts and Singhbhum region of Jharkhand. The Saraks belonging to most of Jharkhand and West Bengal are Bengali speakers. Educated Saraks speak fluent English.

In 2009, more than 165 Sarak Jains living in parts of West Bengal, Jharkhand and Bihar visited the ancient Jain pilgrimage center of Shravanabelagola. A special function to welcome the Sarak Jains was organised at Shravanabelagola.

== Pakbirra, Purulia Temples and Sculptures ==
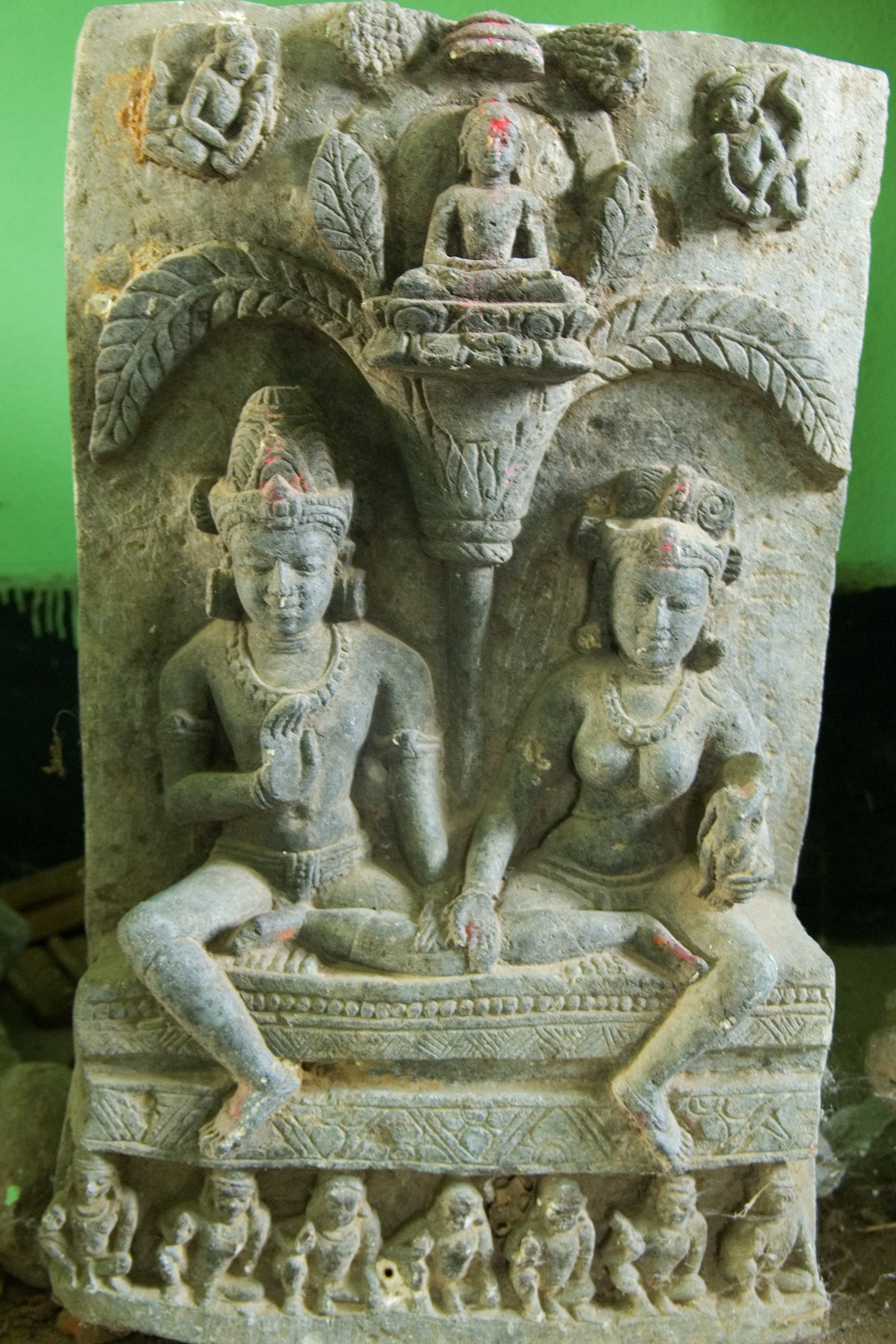
Divine couple with child, Pakbirra, Purulia

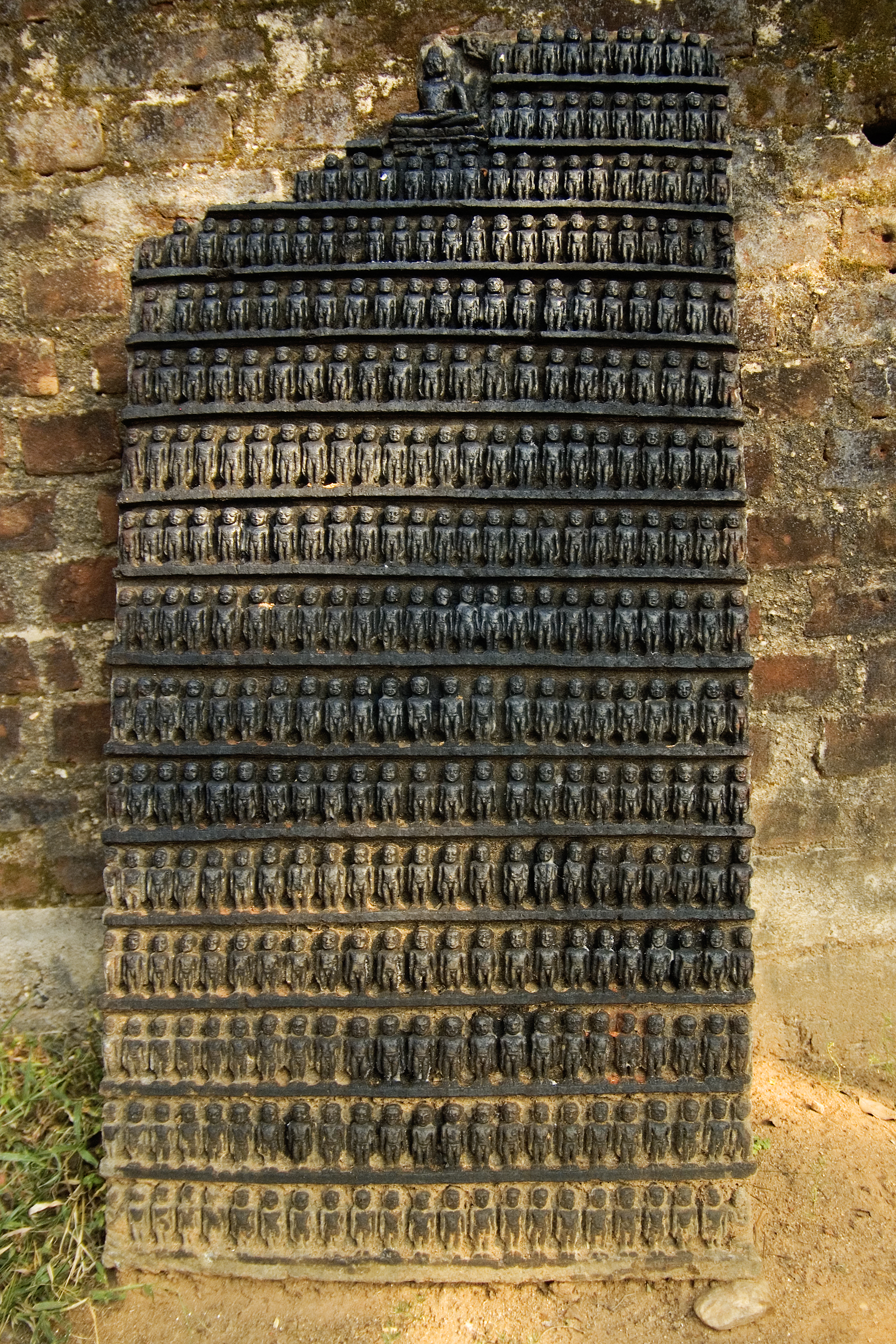
Sahasrakuta, Pakbirra, Purulia

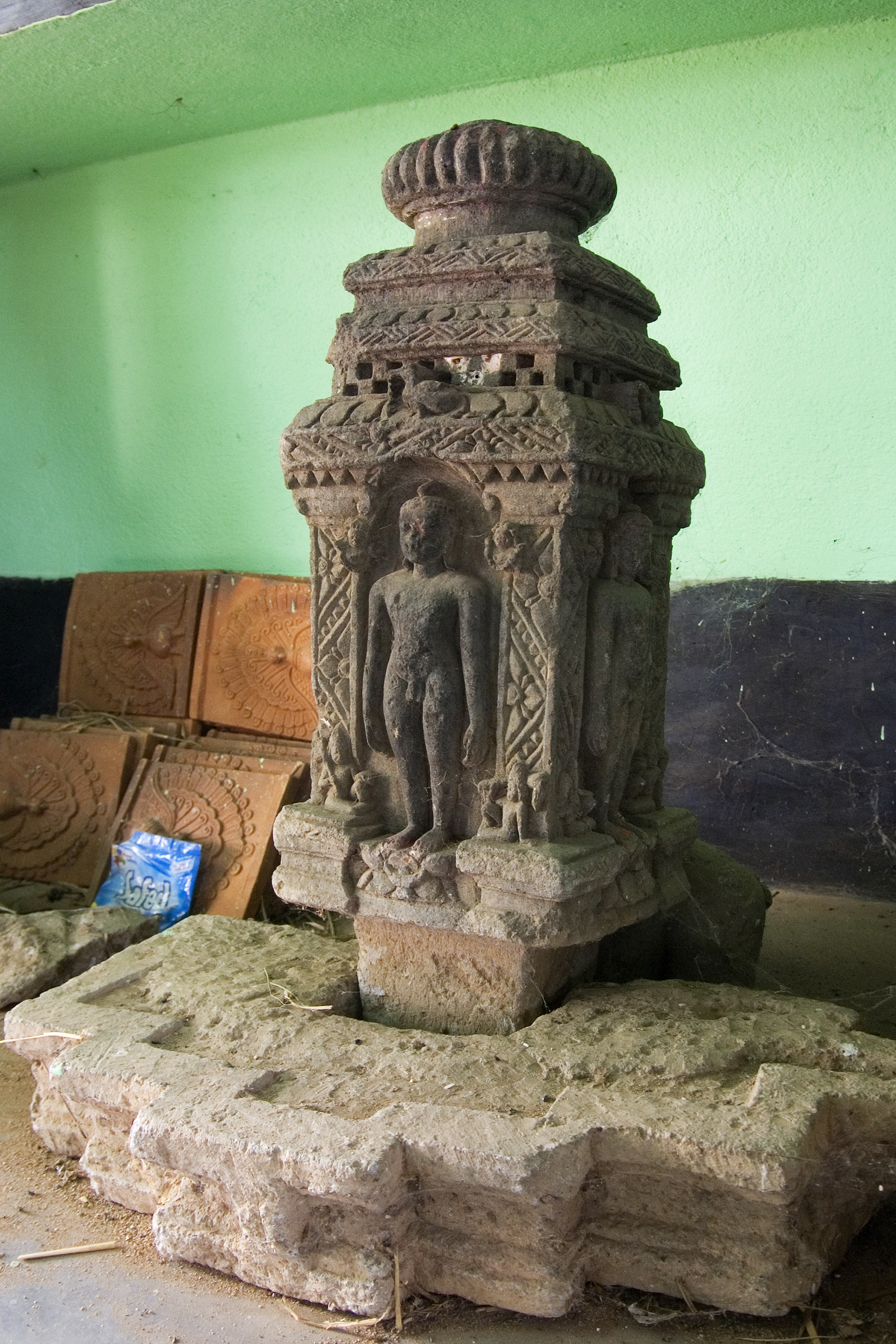
Miniature shrine, Pakbirra, Purulia

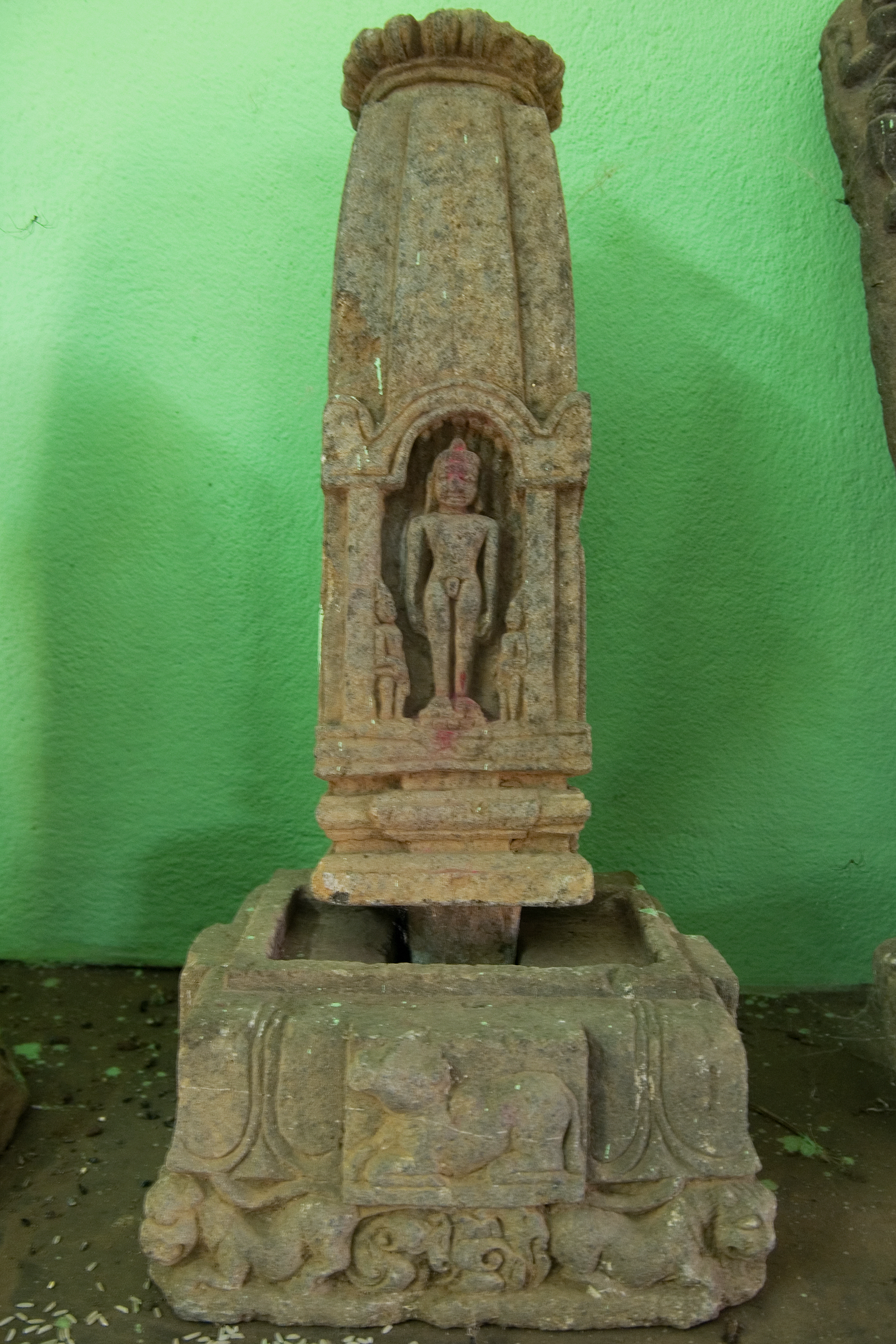
Miniature shrine, Pakbirra, Purulia

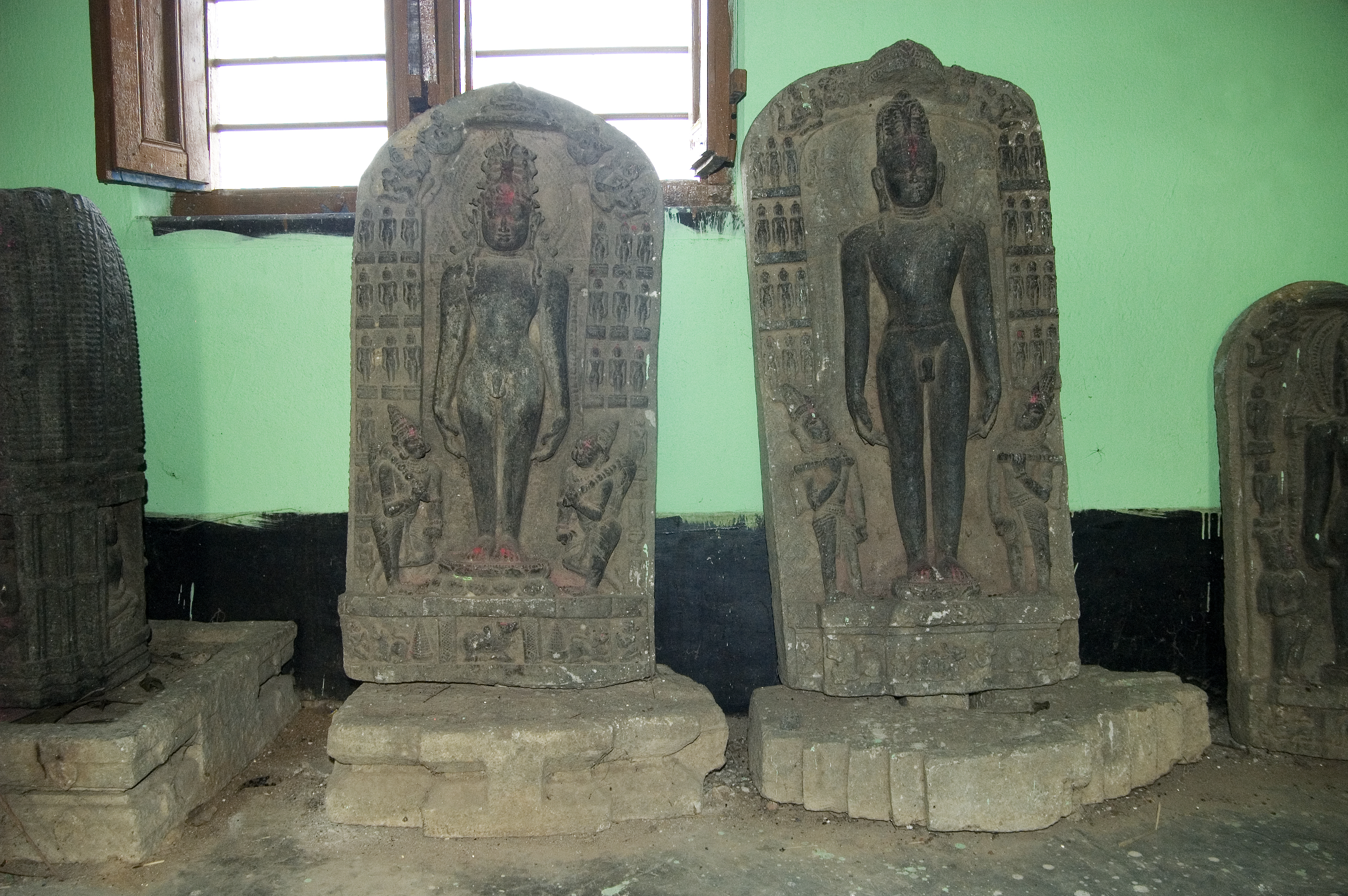
Adinatha Idols

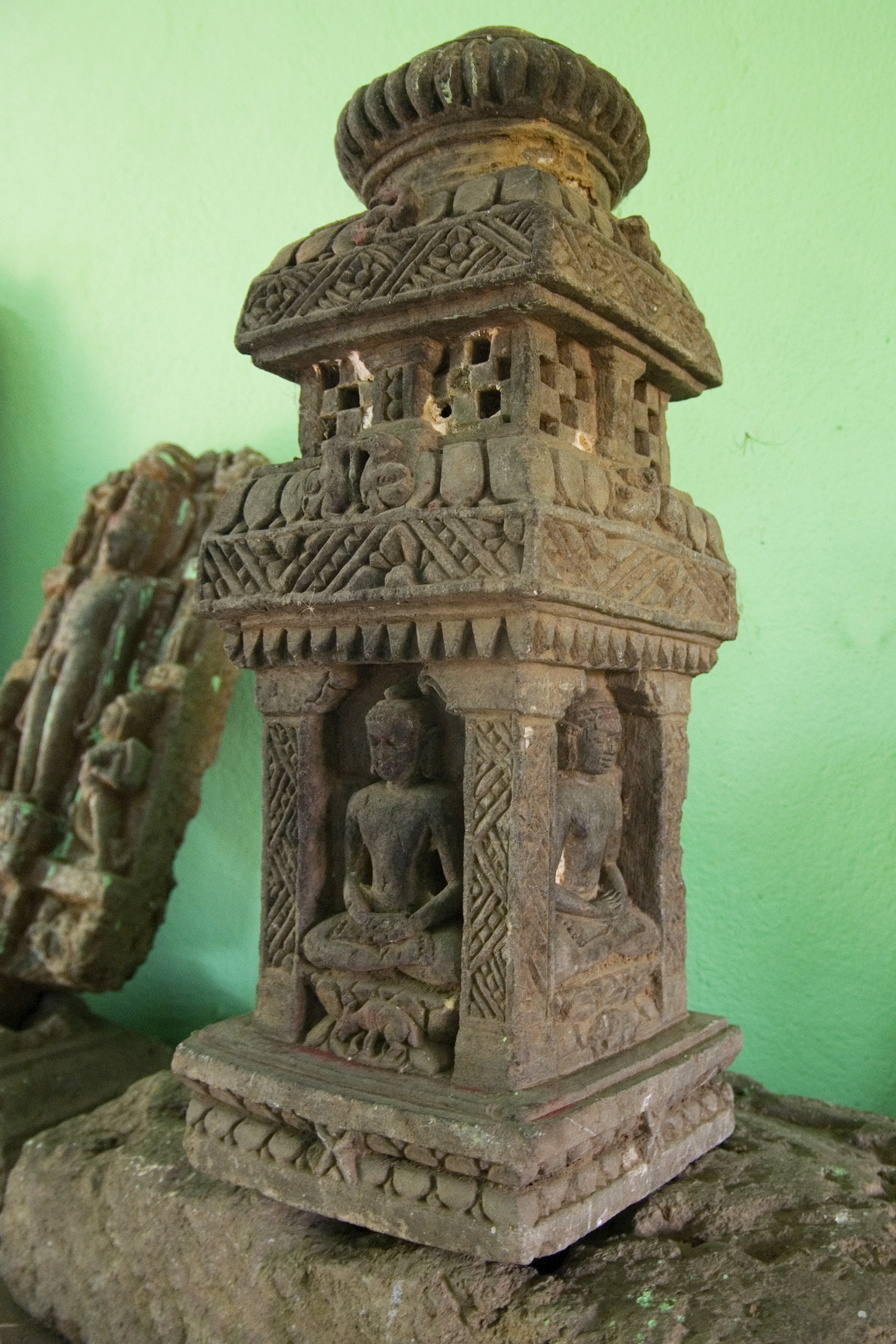
Miniature shrine, Pakbirra, Purulia

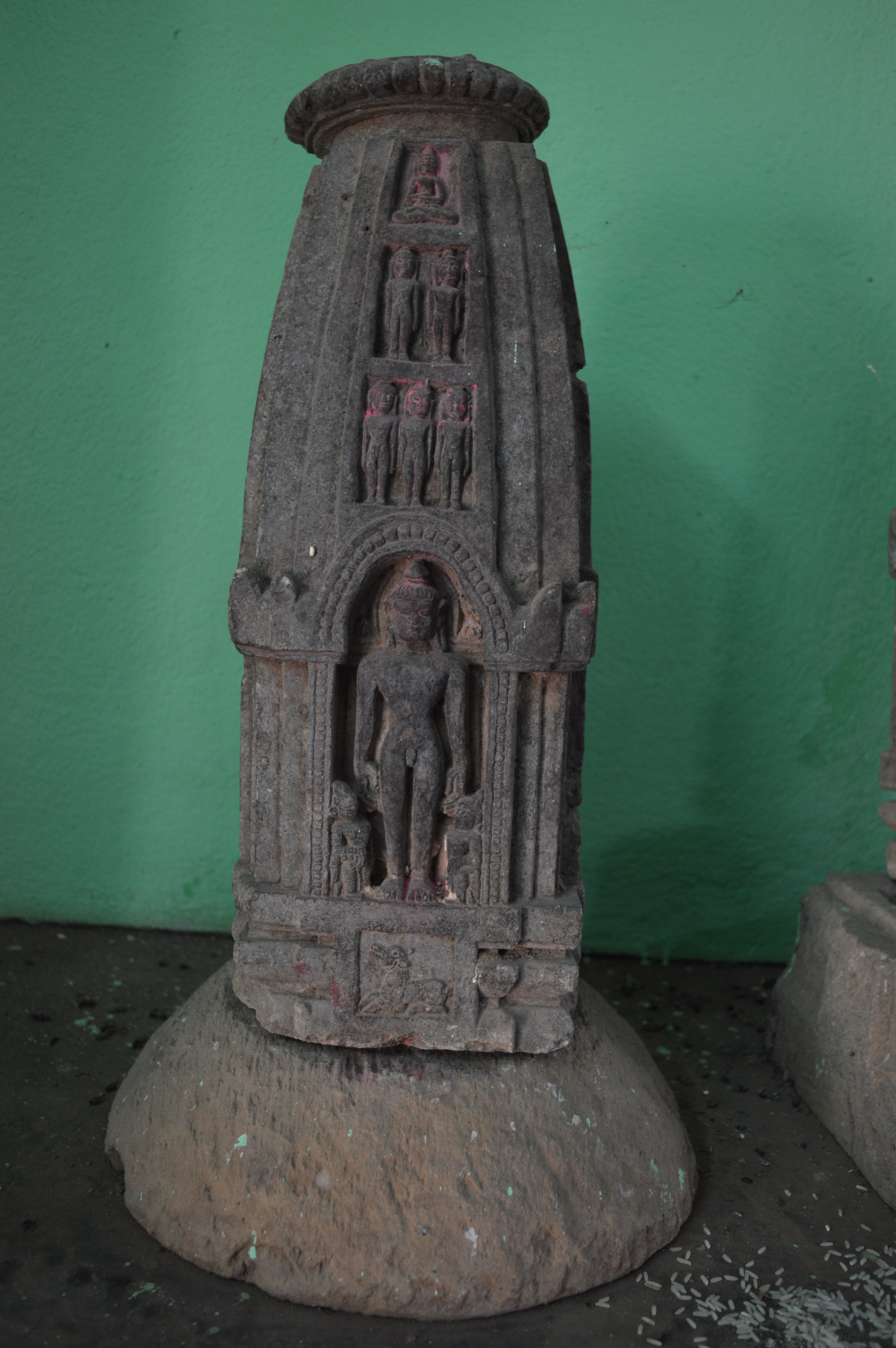
Miniature shrine, Pakbirra, Purulia

Jain Sculptures at Pakbirra

== See also ==
- Śrāvaka (Jainism)
- Jainism in Bengal
- Jainism in Bangladesh
- Basudih
- Maji (surname)
