= Maji (surname) =

Origin
- Origin: Bengali Hindu
- Region of origin: Bengal

Maji (Bengali: মাজি, माजि), also spelled as Majee, is a Bengali Hindu and Bengali Jain, bengali Yadav (Mainly Ghosh) surname. They originated from the Rarh region of ancient Bengal. The Bengali Hindus may belong to Mahishya, Tili, Jalia Kaibartta,Gowala (Gwala, Yadav, ঘোষ) and Ugra Kshatriya castes and the Bengali Jains may belong to Sarak caste. They are of Indian Origin. They are mostly found in Burdwan, Hooghly, Bankura, Purulia and Medinipur districts of West Bengal.

== See also ==
- Majji
- Majhi (disambiguation)
- Sarak
