= Deulbhira Jain Temple =

Medieval Jain rock-cut temple in West Bengal, India

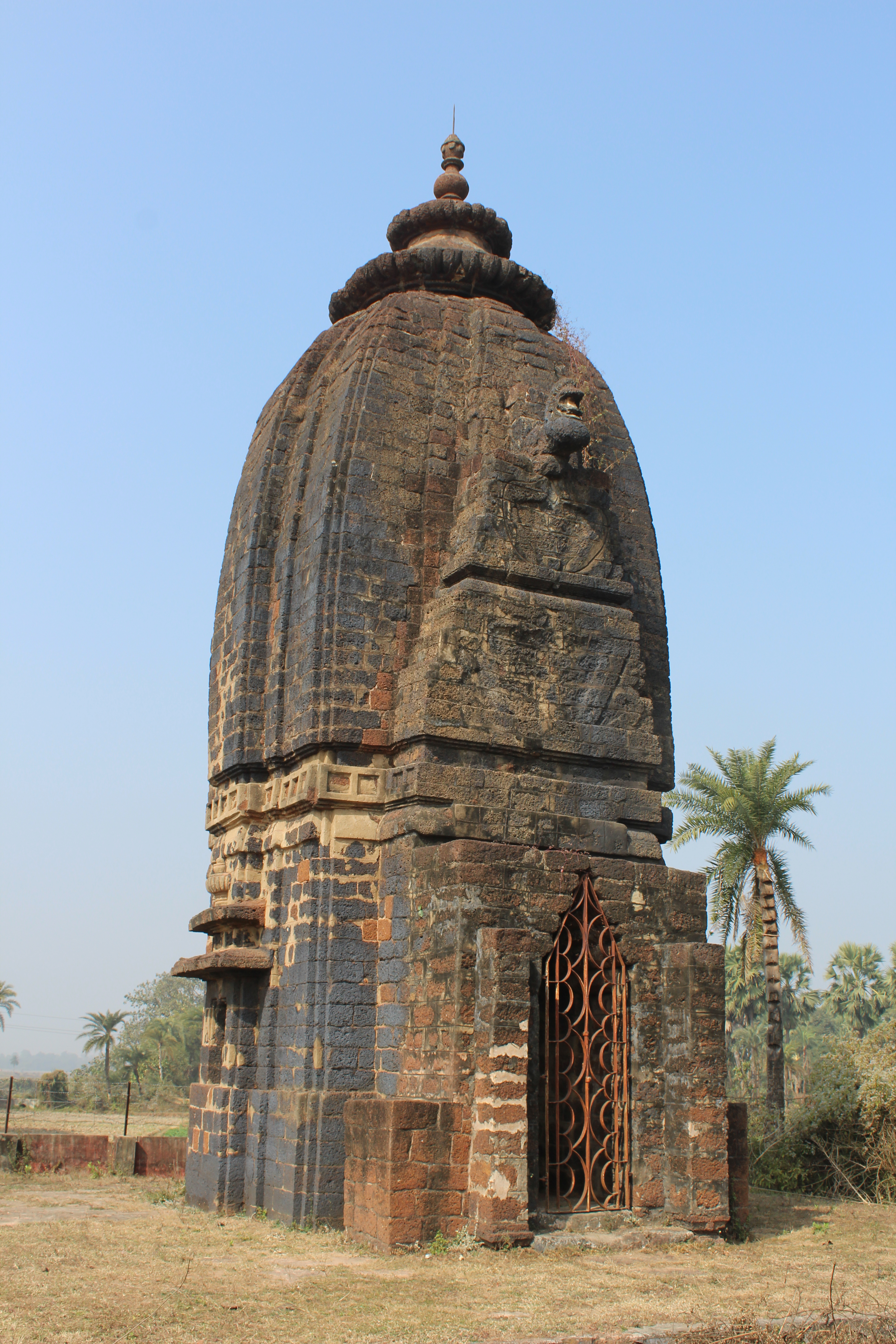
- Deulbhira Jain Temple

Religion
- Affiliation: Jainism
- Deity: Parshvanatha

Location
- Location: Deulbhira, Taldangra

Architecture
- Type: Rekha deula
- Style: Kalinga architecture
- Established: 13th century
- Temple: 1

Deulbhira Jain Temple is a medieval Jain temple at Deulbhira in Bankura district, West Bengal, India. The temple is a laterite-built Rekha deula of the Orissan architectural tradition and is generally dated to the 13th century.

The temple is located southwestern of Deulbhira village and is protected by the Archaeological Survey of India (ASI).

== History ==
The temple was discovered in 1979 by B. Bandyopadhyaya. The temples is a 13th century stone temple with Kalinga architecture. Its date is supported by architectural characteristics associated with the later phase of the Jain temples of western Bengal and by the increasing use of laterite as a principal building material. D. R. Das notes that laterite was not favoured for temple construction in the region before the 13th century and consequently places Deulbhira among the later Jain temples of the area.

There are several Jain temples and sculptures present-day Bankura district and Purulia district.

== Architecture ==
Deulbhira temple is constructed of laterite and stands on a low plinth and follows a triratha plan a subsidiary appearance of a pancharatha plan. The primary attraction is the garbhagriha. The temple originally had a superstructure of the curvilinear rekha type. Its exterior is without any ornate carving.

The lower portion of the wall is divided into the architectural sections of the regional temple tradition. The jangha is largely plain but contains a niche on the central projection. The upper baranda is articulated by mouldings including the khura, pata and kanti. The temple's entrance incorporates a projecting vestibular feature (gamā) with external treatment produces a gable-shaped sukanasa. The sukanasa is divided into two storeys and is surmounted by a crouching lion. The original upper elements have been lost or reconstructed.

== Jain affiliation ==
The temple's Jain affiliation is established principally through the discovery of Jain sculptures in the vicinity. D. R. Das notes that the original image installed in the temple was missing, but that several Jain images, including an image of Parshvanatha, were found near the temple site. These finds indicate that the temple was Jain in affiliation. The Parshvanatha image formerly associated with the temple is now preserved in the Indian Museum in Kolkata.

== Sculpture ==
The discovery of Jain images around the temple is significant because the architectural structure itself contains relatively little exterior figural decoration. The Parshvanatha image provides the principal identification of the temple's original religious dedication. The presence of Jain sculptures at Deulbhira is consistent with the wider archaeological evidence for Jain religious activity in western Bengal during the medieval period. Numerous Jain Tirthankara images and temple remains have been documented in Bankura and neighbouring Purulia.

== Conservation ==
The Archaeological Survey of India has undertaken conservation work at the temple. During the 1979–80 period, debris around the laterite temple was cleared, the plinth was consolidated and repairs were carried out to the deteriorating sikhara. The main amalaka was restored as part of the conservation work. The temple remains under ASI protection. A recent archaeological study describes the structure as abandoned and notes deterioration of the surrounding premises and vegetation around the monument.

== Significance ==
Deulbhira is significant for the study of medieval Jain architecture in western Bengal. Its combination of a laterite-built rekha deula, Jain sculptural evidence and regional Orissan architectural features illustrates the interaction between Jain religious patronage and the architectural traditions of eastern India. The temple also forms part of a broader group of medieval Jain monuments in Bankura and Purulia districts, where Jain communities established temples and installed images during the later medieval period.

The survival of the structure is particularly important because many Jain temples and sculptures in western Bengal have been damaged, relocated or incorporated into later religious contexts. The removal of the Parshvanatha image to the Indian Museum has left the original temple without its principal cult image.

== See also ==
- Pakbirra Jain temples
- Banda Deul
- Bahulara
