= Basudih =

- Village
- Location in Jamtara, Jharkhand Basudih (India)
- Coordinates: 23.98298°N 87.10255°E
- Country: India
- State: Jharkhand
- District: Jamtara
- Established: 1990
- Founder: Shree Brajamohan Maji

Area
  - Total: 5 km^{2} (1.9 sq mi)
- Elevation: 155 m (509 ft)

Population (2001)
  - Total: 500
  - Density: 100/km^{2} (260/sq mi)

Languages (*For language details see Nala block#Language and religion)
  - Official: Hindi, Urdu
- Time zone: UTC+5:30 (IST)
- PIN: 815359
- Telephone code: 06428
- Vehicle registration: JH-21
- Sex ratio: 959 ♂/♀
- Website: welcometobasudih.blogspot.com

Basudih is a village in Nala block, Jamtara district, Jharkhand state, India has a Population (2001 Census) of 500 in about 50 families.

== Geography ==
Cities, towns and locations in the Deoghar, Dumka and Jamtara districts in Santhal Pargana Division
M: Municipality, CT: census town, R: Rural/ Urban centre, D: Dam,
Owing to space constraints in the small map, the actual locations in a larger map may vary slightly

=== Location ===
Basudih is located at 23.98298°N 87.10255°E.

=== Overview ===
The map shows a large area, which is a plateau with low hills, except in the eastern portion where the Rajmahal hills intrude into this area and the Ramgarh hills are there. The south-western portion is just a rolling upland. The entire area is overwhelmingly rural with only small pockets of urbanisation.

Note: The full screen map is interesting. All places marked on the map are linked in the full screen map and one can easily move on to another page of his/her choice. Enlarge the full screen map to see what else is there – one gets railway connections, many more road connections and so on.

== Demographics ==
As of 2001 India census, Basudih had a population of 500. Males constitute 51% of the population and females 49%. Basudih has an average literacy rate of 71%, higher than the national average of 59.5%, male literacy is 78%, and female literacy is 62%. In Basudih, 12% of the population is under 6 years of age.

== Climate ==
Basudih has a humid subtropical climate (Köppen climate classification Cwa), with warm, wet summers and mild winters.

Climate data for Basudih
Month	Jan	Feb	Mar	Apr	May	Jun	Jul	Aug	Sep	Oct	Nov	Dec	Year
Record high °C (°F)	33.3 (91.9)	35.6 (96.1)	42.8 (109.0)	46.3 (115.3)	48.3 (118.9)	45.2 (113.4)	41.5 (106.7)	38.6 (101.5)	38.1 (100.6)	37.6 (99.7)	35.8 (96.4)	31.2 (88.2)	48.3 (118.9)
Mean daily maximum °C (°F)	25.9 (78.6)	28.9 (84.0)	34.3 (93.7)	38.4 (101.1)	37.5 (99.5)	35.5 (95.9)	32.7 (90.9)	32.5 (90.5)	32.9 (91.2)	33.0 (91.4)	30.5 (86.9)	27.0 (80.6)	32.4 (90.4)
Mean daily minimum °C (°F)	10.2 (50.4)	13.2 (55.8)	17.4 (63.3)	22.3 (72.1)	23.9 (75.0)	24.7 (76.5)	24.1 (75.4)	23.7 (74.7)	23.6 (74.5)	21.0 (69.8)	16.0 (60.8)	11.1 (52.0)	19.3 (66.7)
Record low °C (°F)	1.7 (35.1)	1.8 (35.2)	5.8 (42.4)	13.8 (56.8)	14.5 (58.1)	17.8 (64.0)	13.4 (56.1)	16.8 (62.2)	13.8 (56.8)	11.8 (53.2)	4.8 (40.6)	2.8 (37.0)	1.7 (35.1)
Average precipitation mm (inches)	9.0 (0.35)	15.0 (0.59)	21.0 (0.83)	35.0 (1.38)	72.0 (2.83)	198.0 (7.80)	343.0 (13.50)	293.0 (11.54)	273.0 (10.75)	116.0 (4.57)	9.0 (0.35)	7.0 (0.28)	1,391 (54.77)
Average rainy days	1.5	2.3	2.2	2.8	6.3	11.3	18.9	16.9	14.1	5.7	1.1	0.8	83.9
Average relative humidity (%)	60	53	47	50	60	73	83	83	81	74	65	62	66
Source: NOAA (1971-1990)

== Gallery ==
Images of different places in Basudih
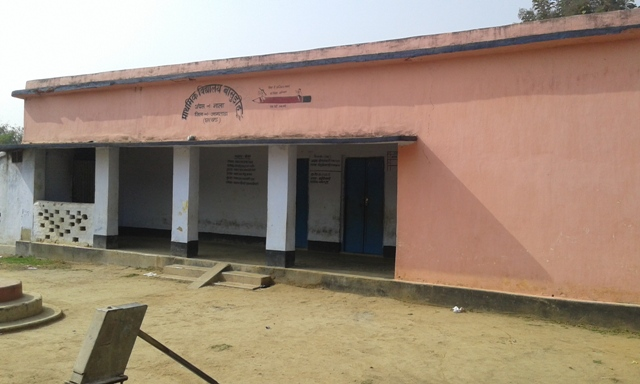
Primary School Basudih

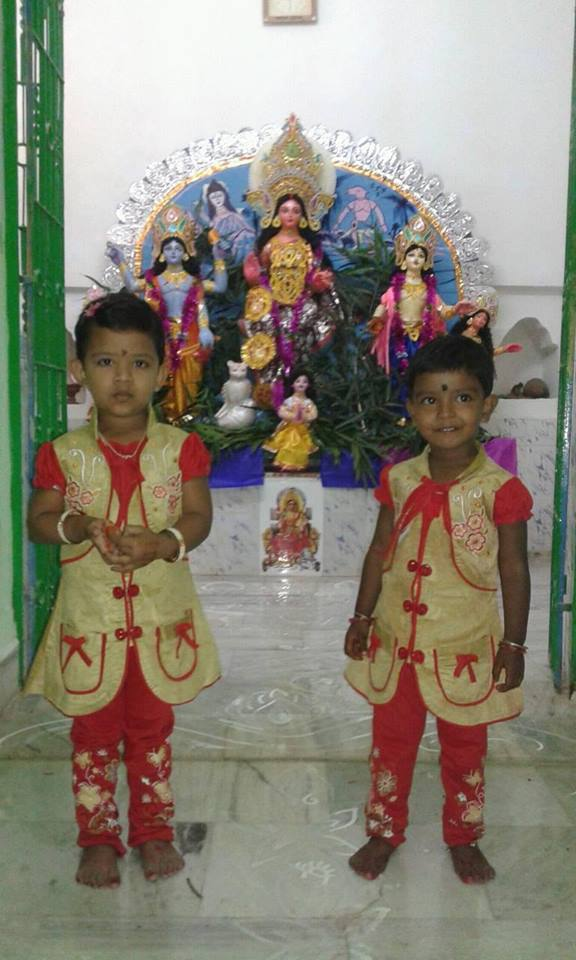
Lakshmi Puja

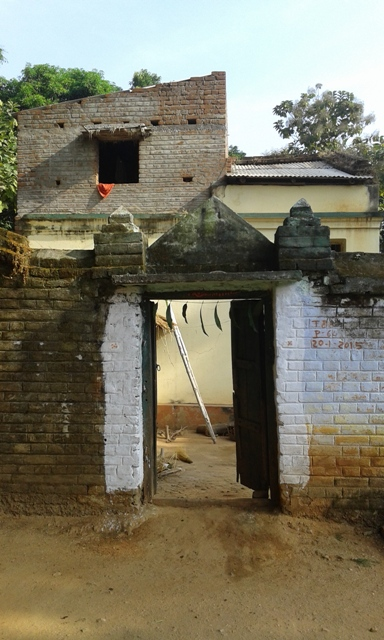
Shree Taraniprasad Maji House

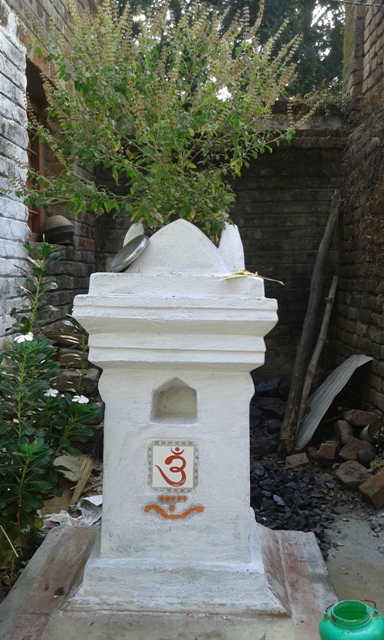
Tulsi Mandir

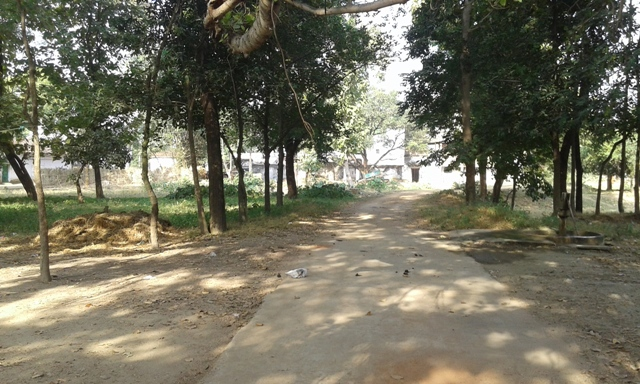
Basudih Road

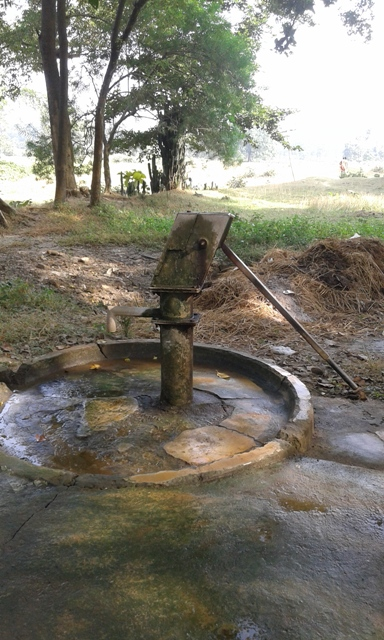
Water Supply

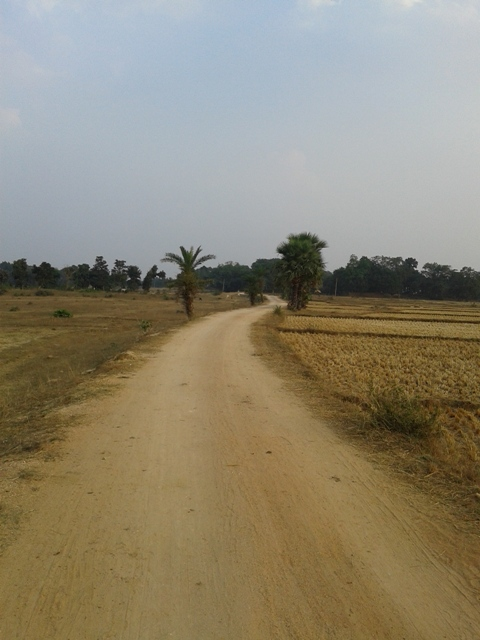
Main Road

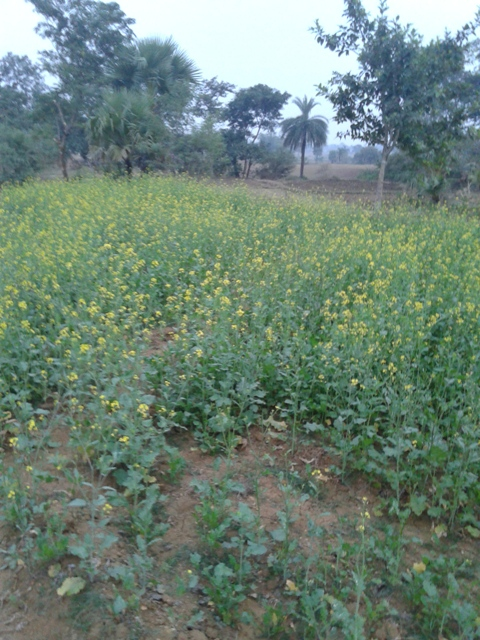
Sarso Khet

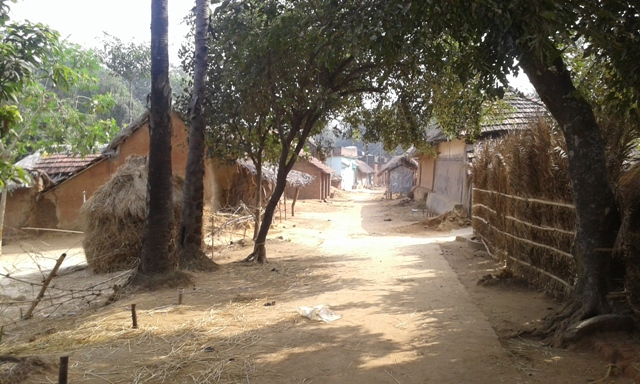
Santhal Para

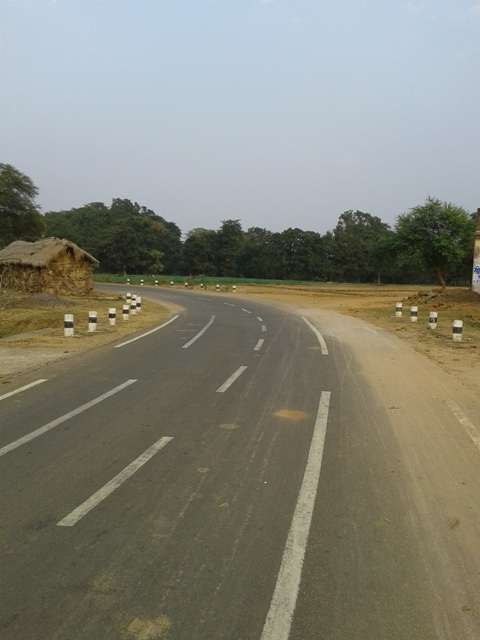
Highway

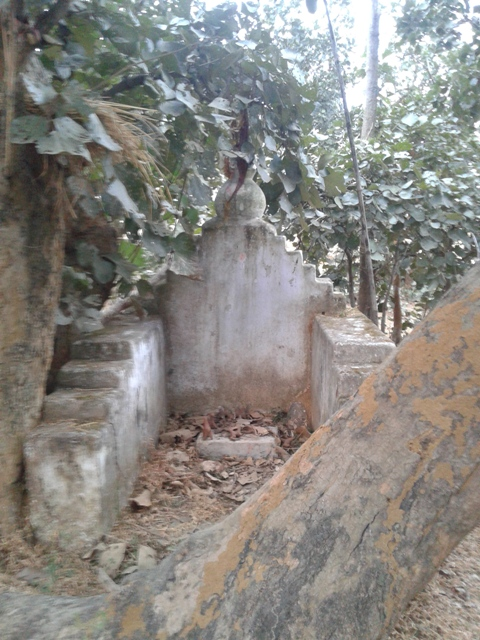
Maa Chandi Temple

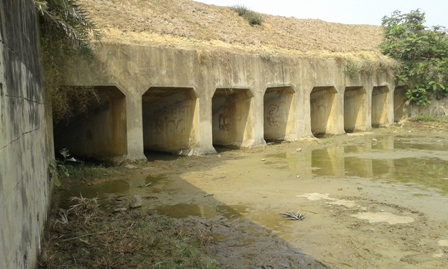
Basudih Dam

== See also ==
- Sarak
- Maji (surname)
