= Majji =

Majji (Telugu: మజ్జి) is a Telugu surname:

- Majji Sundarayya Patrudu was an Indian Communist politician.
- Majji Tulasi Das was an Indian politician.
- Majji Narayana Rao was an Indian politician.

== See also ==
- Maji (surname)
- Majhi (disambiguation)
