= Pakbirra Jain temples =

Jain temples in the state of West Bengal

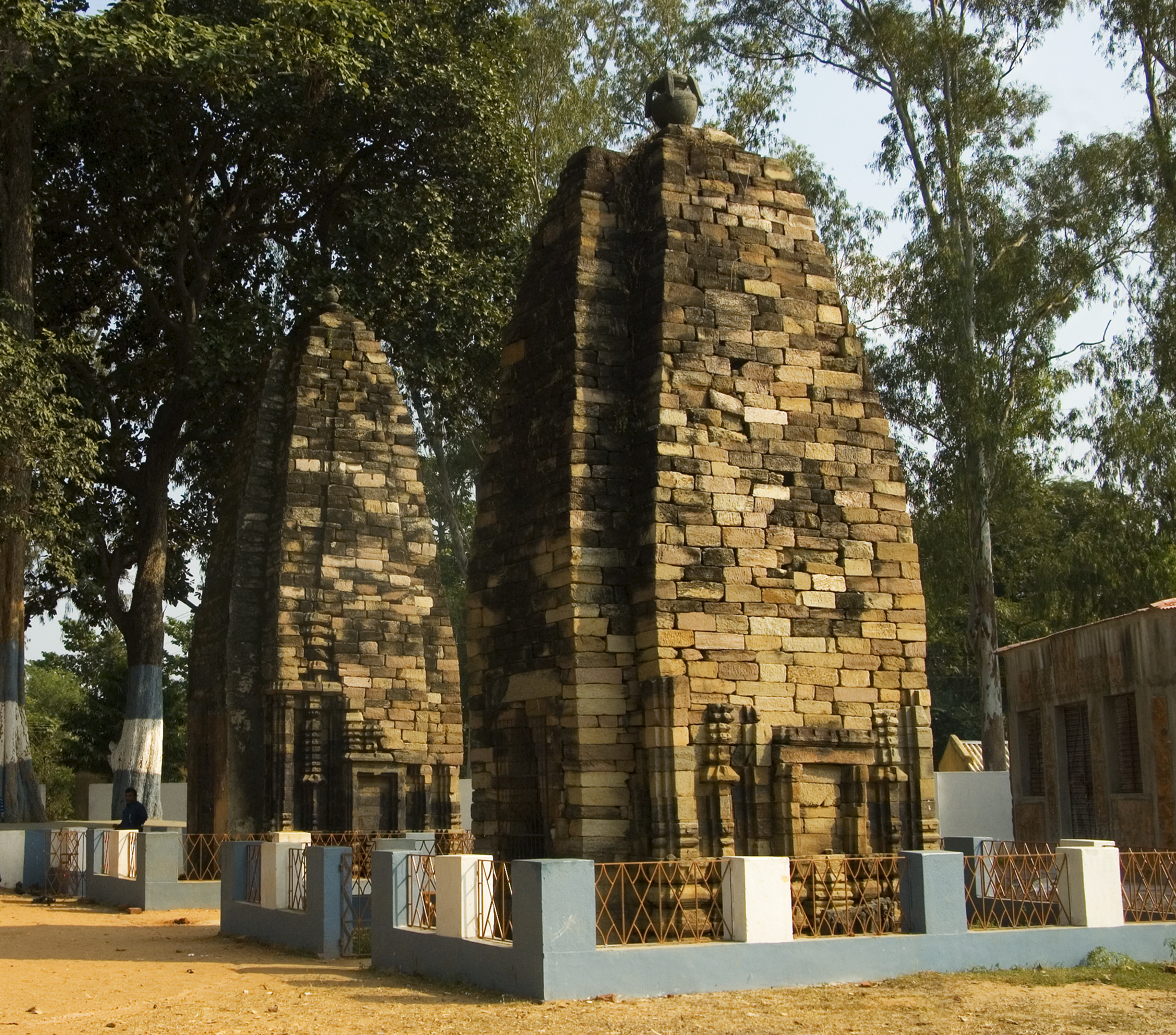
- Purulia Deul

Religion
- Affiliation: Jainism
- Deity: Tirthankaras
- Festival: Mahavir Jayanti

Location
- Location: Purulia, West Bengal

Architecture
- Style: Pala architecture
- Established: 9th century CE
- Temple: 3

Pakbirra Jain temples is a group of three Jain temples in Pakbirra village in Purulia district of West Bengal.

== History ==
Purulia was an important Jain center from 6th to 13th century. The Pakbirra Jain complex dates back to c. 9th century. The archaeological remains at Pakbirra were documented during the 19th century. In 1865, C. J. Beavan reported several ruined temples at the site, three of which were then still standing. The site was subsequently surveyed by J. D. Beglar for the Archaeological Survey of India, who described numerous temples and sculptures, principally Jain, at Pakbirra.

Beglar found the principal sculptures collected within a long shed standing on the foundations of a large ruined temple. He concluded from the surviving foundations that this temple had faced west and originally contained a sanctuary preceded by chambers and a hall. The principal surviving sculpture recorded by Beglar was a colossal standing Jina approximately 7.5 feet (2.3 m) high, identified by the lotus emblem on its pedestal.

The archaeological remains documented in the 19th century indicate that Pakbirra originally contained a considerably larger Jain religious complex than the three surviving temples.

== Architecture ==
The temple complex consist of three stone temples, the smallest in eastern side and two in the north. These temples are built in triratha nagara style. There are fragments of large amalaka, and the stone kalasha with lotus buds. The principal temple is large and contains preliminary chambers and sanctum. Beglar's archaeological survey recorded the foundations of a large temple at the site. From its surviving plan, he identified a complete sequence of preliminary chambers and a hall in front of the sanctuary. The temple faced west. The temple in west, enshrined the 7.5 feet (2.3 m) colossal idol of a Padmaprabha with lotus emblem stamped on pedestal. The temple also has sculptures of eight tirthankaras, including three idols of Rishabhanatha, two of Mahavira, Sambhavanatha, Padmaprabha, Chandraprabha in kayotsarga posture and idols of two Yaksha and Yakshi beneath a tree with an image of Jina on top. Three ayagapata or votive stupas and an idol of Ambika standing beneath a flowering tree with her children and an attendant with lion as her vehicle. Beglar recorded at least two votive chaityas among the sculptural remains. One was carved on four sides with standing figures distinguished by their respective emblems, including a lion, antelope and bull. The temple also enshrines patta with 360 Jina figurine.

Pakbirra Jain complex also has an open-air museum with sculptures of Jain deities.

== Sculptures ==
Pakbirra preserves an important collection of medieval Jain sculpture representing both the Tirthankaras and attendant Jain deities. The assemblage includes monumental and smaller images of the Jinas, votive monuments and images of Yakshas and Yakshinis.' The colossal Padmaprabha is the most prominent surviving image. Beglar measured the nude standing figure at approximately 7.5 feet (2.3 m) and recorded the lotus symbol on its pedestal. Among the other sculptures documented at the site are images identifiable through their lanchhanas, including figures bearing the bull emblem of Rishabhanatha. An image of Ambika represents the goddess beneath a flowering tree, accompanied by her children and an attendant, with the lion serving as her vehicle. The presence of images of Tirthankaras, attendant deities, votive chaityas and multi-Jina panels indicates the diversity of Jain devotional sculpture represented at Pakbirra.

== Early archaeological documentation ==
Pakbirra attracted the attention of antiquarians and archaeologists during the 19th century. C. J. Beavan visited the site in 1865 and reported three standing temples—two constructed of stone and one of brick—together with additional ruined temples in the surrounding area. Beavan also described a colossal nude figure preserved in a small shed near the temples and several smaller sculptures. He reported finding no inscriptions that could establish the date of the monuments. J. D. Beglar subsequently surveyed Pakbirra for the Archaeological Survey of India. His account provides an important record of the site before the further deterioration and loss of several of its architectural remains.

== Gallery ==
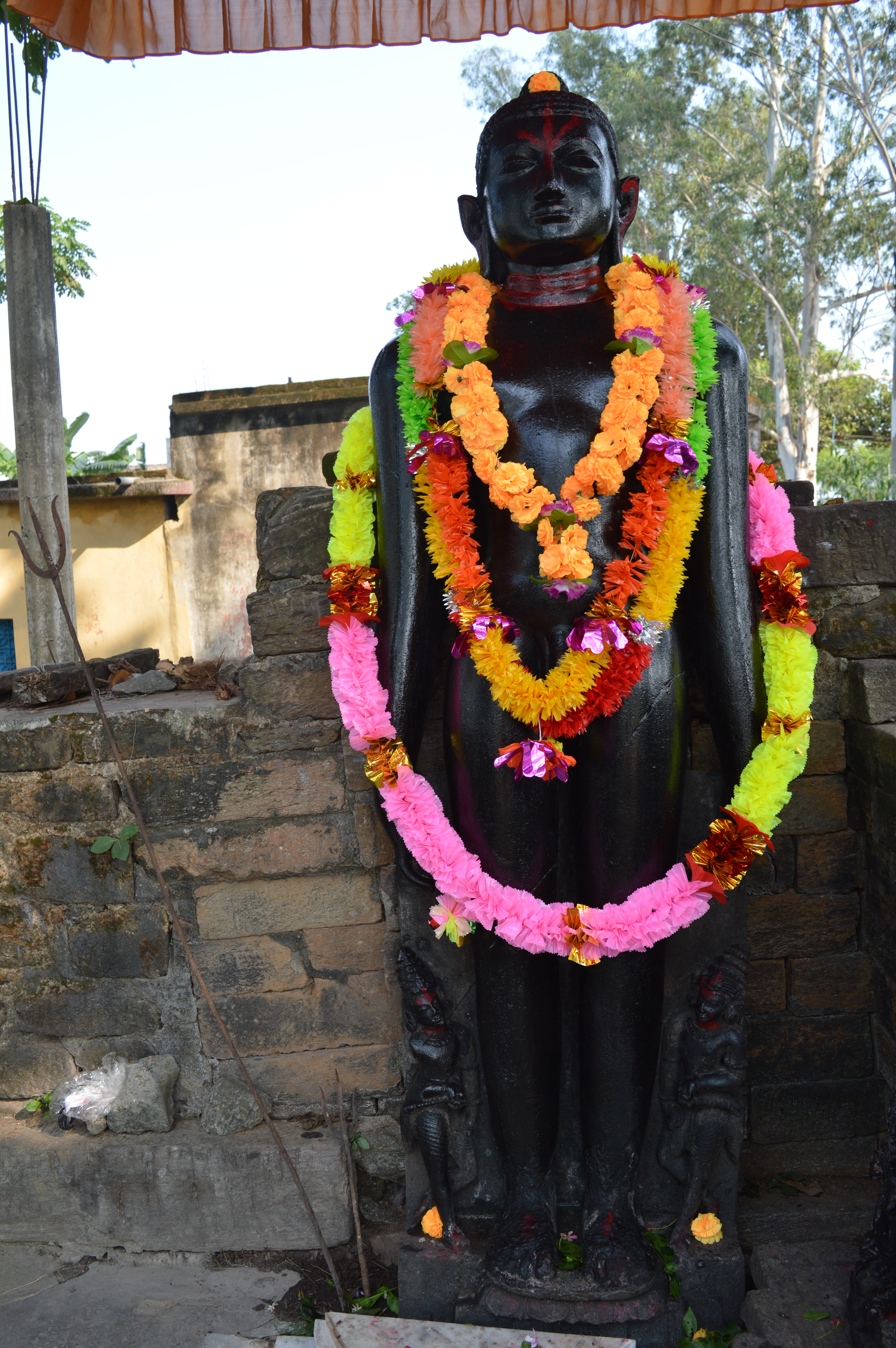
7.5 feet (2.3 m) Padmaprabha

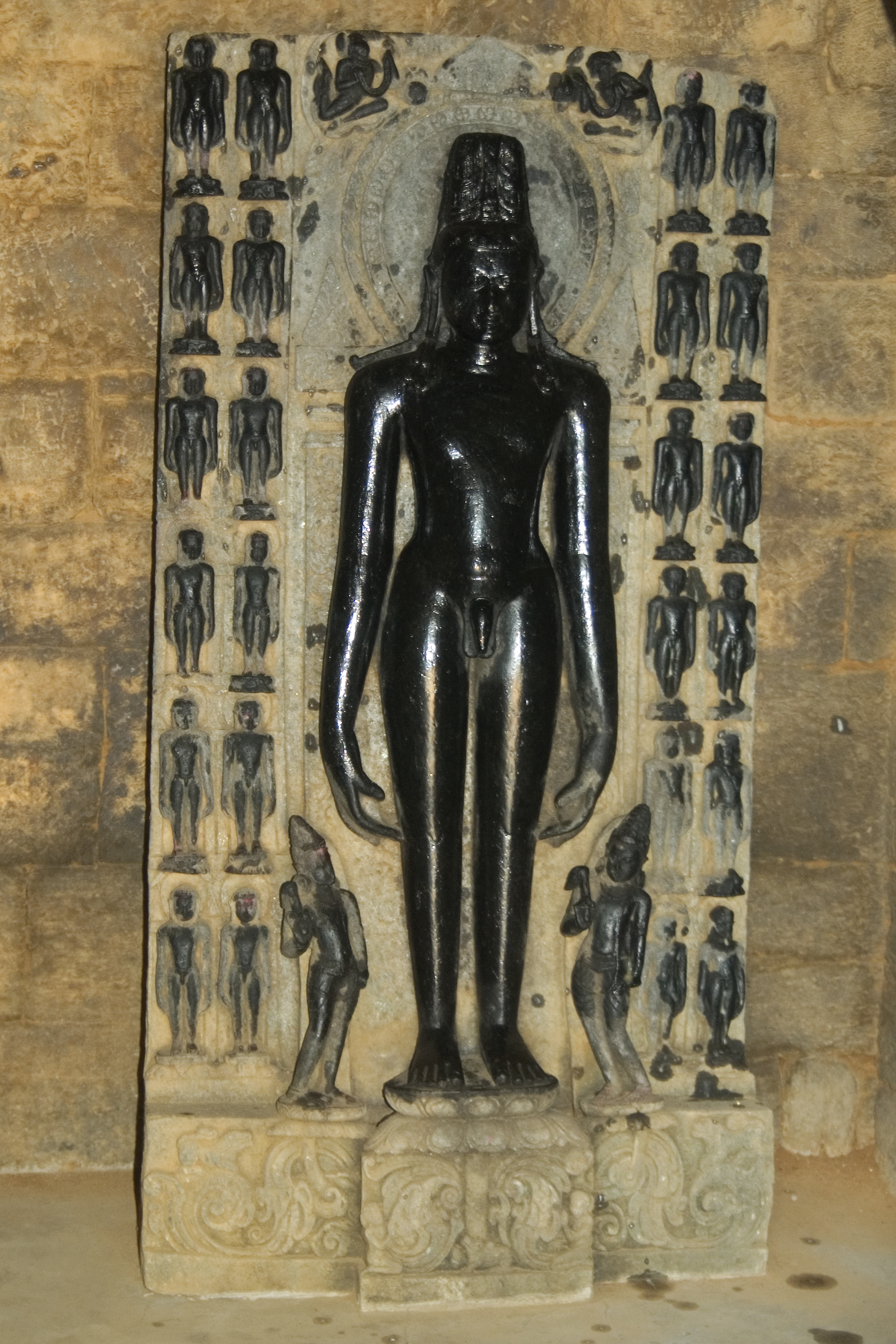
Rishabhanatha

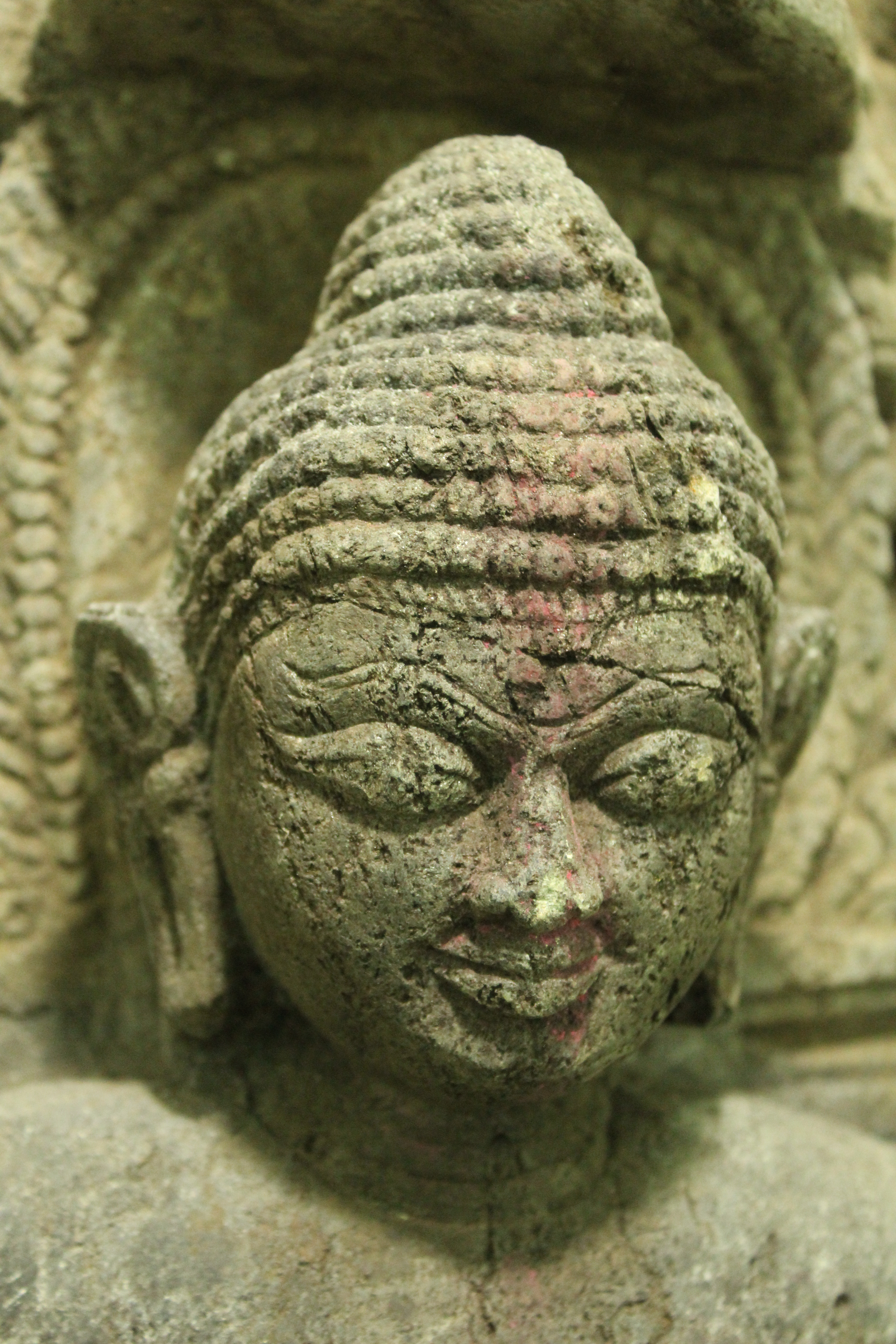
Shantinatha

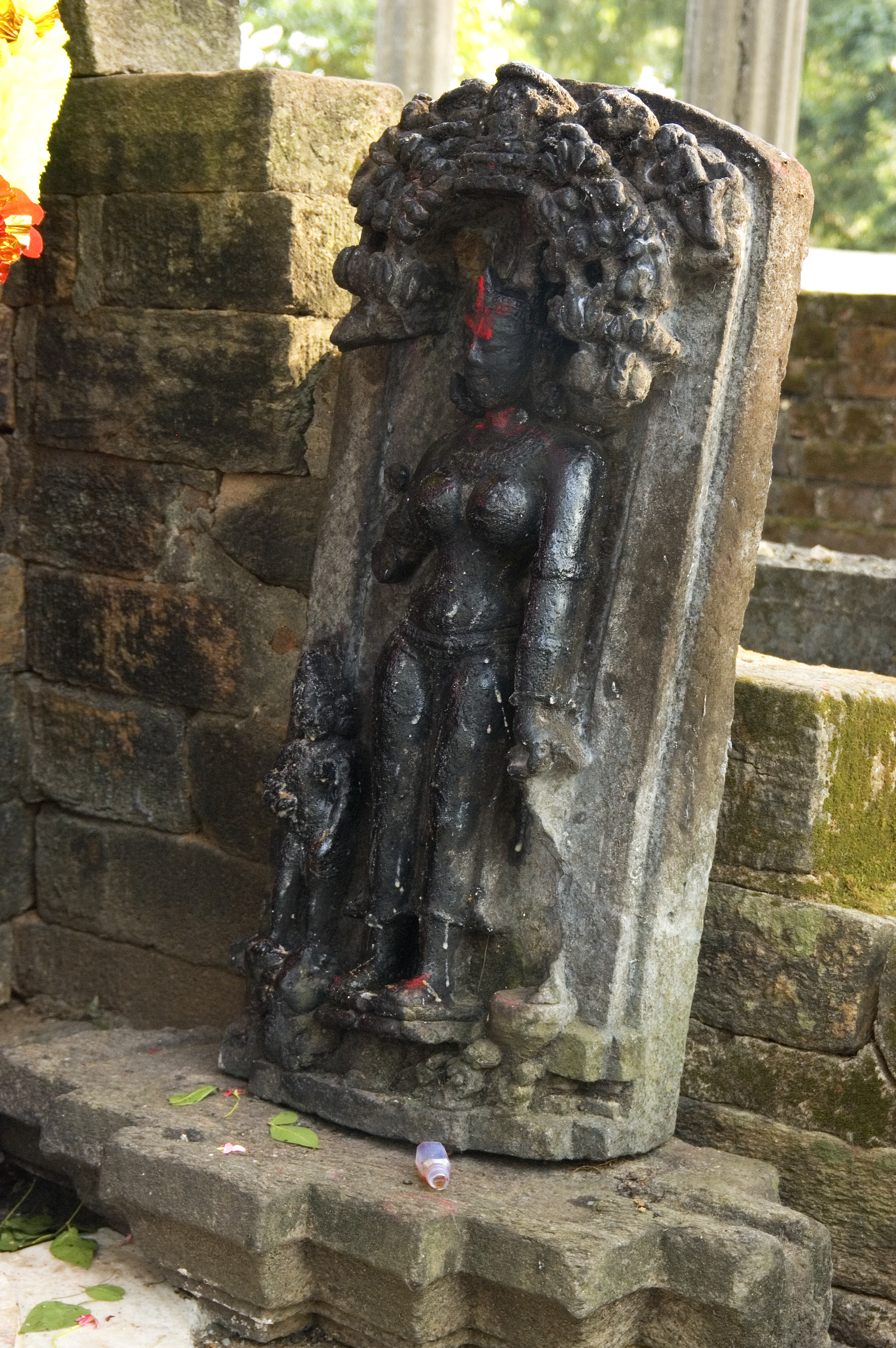
Statue of Ambika at Pakbirra

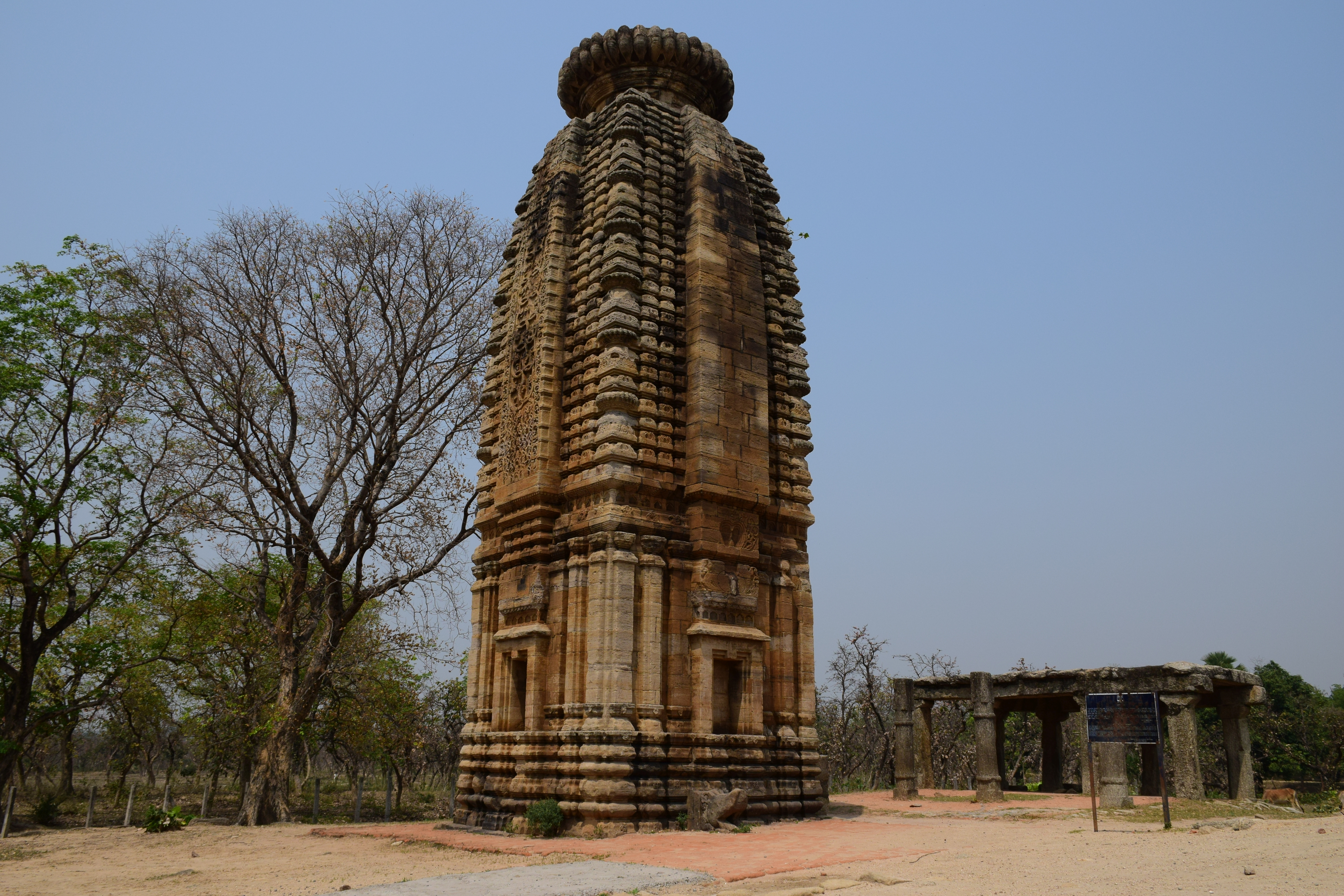
Jain temple in Banda
