= Witchcraft =

Practices believed to use supernatural powers

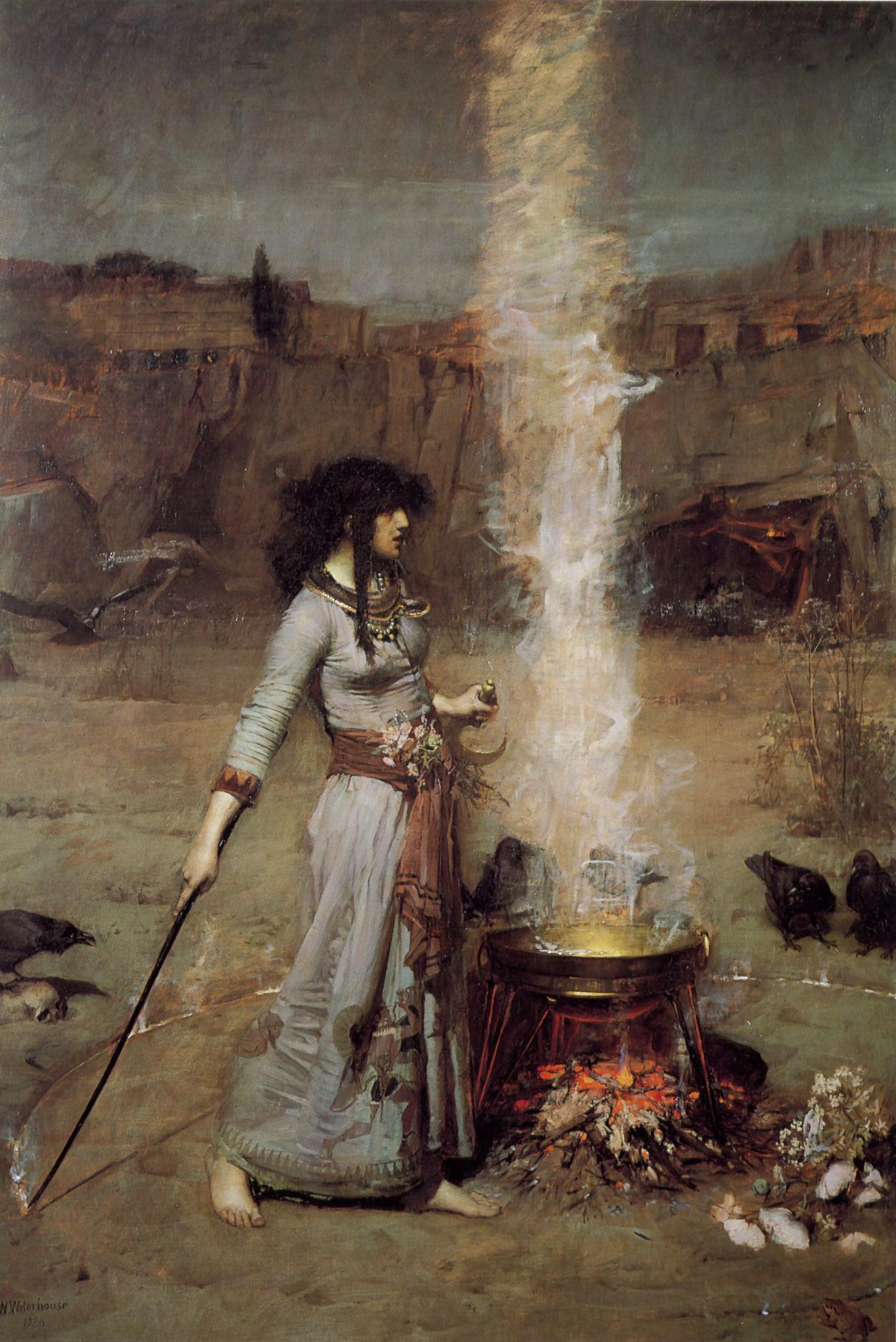
Depiction of witchcraft in John William Waterhouse's painting The Magic Circle (1886)

Witchcraft is the use of magic by a person called a witch. Traditionally, "witchcraft" means the use of magic to inflict supernatural harm or misfortune on others, and this remains the most common and widespread meaning. Though the idea of witchcraft is largely imaginary, it has nevertheless served in many cultures as a way to explain the presence of evil. The belief in witches has been found throughout history in a great number of societies worldwide. Most of these societies have used protective magic or counter-magic against witchcraft, and have shunned, banished, imprisoned, physically punished or killed alleged witches. Anthropologists use the term "witchcraft" for similar beliefs about harmful occult practices in different cultures, and these societies often use the term when speaking in English.

Belief in witchcraft as malevolent magic is attested from ancient Mesopotamia, and in Europe, belief in witches traces back to classical antiquity. In medieval and early modern Europe, accused witches were usually women who were believed to have secretly used black magic (maleficium) against their own community. Usually, accusations of witchcraft were made by neighbors of accused witches, and followed from social tensions. Witches were sometimes said to have communed with demons or with the Devil, though such accusations were mainly made against perceived opponents of the Church. It was thought witchcraft could be thwarted by white magic, provided by 'cunning folk' or 'wise people'. Suspected witches were often prosecuted and punished, if found guilty or simply believed to be guilty. European witch-hunts and witch trials in the early modern period led to tens of thousands of executions. While magical healers and midwives were sometimes accused of witchcraft, they made up a minority of those accused. European belief in witchcraft gradually dwindled during and after the Age of Enlightenment.

Many indigenous belief systems that include the concept of witchcraft likewise define witches as malevolent, and seek healers (such as medicine people and witch doctors) to ward off and undo bewitchment. Some African and Melanesian peoples believe witches are driven by an evil spirit or substance inside them. Modern witch-hunting takes place in parts of Africa and Asia.

Since the 1930s, some modern pagans have embraced the term "witch", redefining "witchcraft" as an expression of their neopagan beliefs and practices. Other neopagans avoid the term due to its negative connotations.

== Concept ==
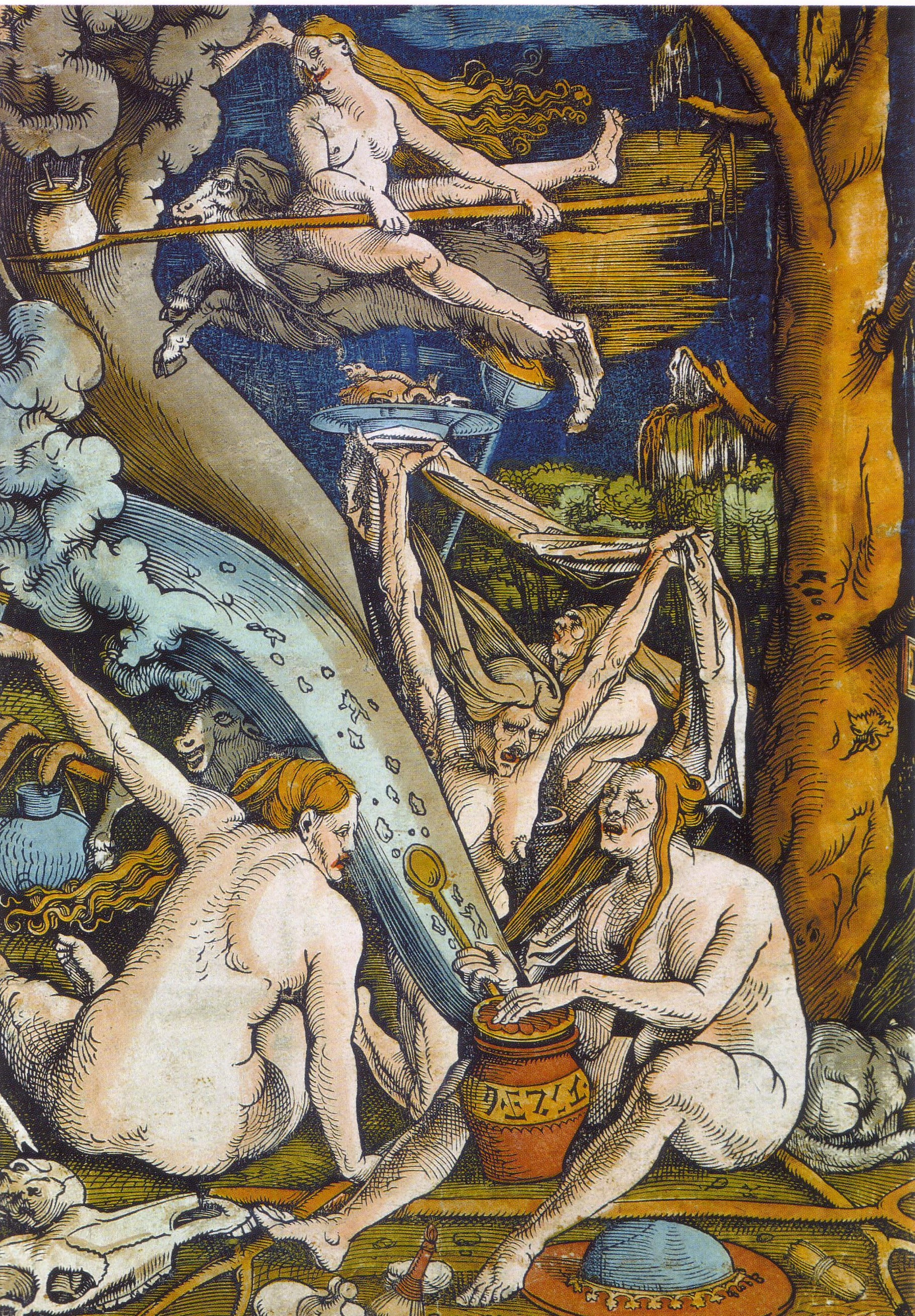
The Witches by Hans Baldung (woodcut), 1508

The most common meaning of "witchcraft" worldwide is the use of harmful magic. Belief in malevolent magic and the concept of witchcraft has lasted throughout recorded history and has been found in cultures worldwide, regardless of development. Most societies have feared an ability by some individuals to cause supernatural harm and misfortune to others. This may come from mankind's tendency "to want to assign occurrences of remarkable good or bad luck to agency, either human or superhuman". Historians and anthropologists see the concept of "witchcraft" as one of the ways humans have tried to explain strange misfortune. Some cultures have feared witchcraft much less than others because they tend to have other explanations for strange misfortune. For example, the Gaels of Ireland and the Scottish Highlands historically held a strong belief in fairy folk, who could cause supernatural harm, and witch-hunting was very rare in these regions compared to other regions of the British Isles.

Historian Ronald Hutton outlined five key characteristics ascribed to witches and witchcraft by most cultures that believe in this concept: the use of magic to cause harm or misfortune to others; it was used by the witch against their own community; powers of witchcraft were believed to have been acquired through inheritance or initiation; it was seen as immoral and often thought to involve communion with evil beings; and witchcraft could be thwarted by defensive magic, persuasion, intimidation or physical punishment of the alleged witch.

A common belief worldwide is that witches use objects, words, and gestures to cause supernatural harm, or that they simply have an innate power to do so. Hutton notes that both kinds of practitioners are often believed to exist in the same culture and that the two often overlap, in that someone with an inborn power could wield that power through material objects.

One of the most influential works on witchcraft and concepts of magic was E. E. Evans-Pritchard's Witchcraft, Oracles and Magic Among the Azande, a study of Azande witchcraft beliefs published in 1937. This provided definitions for witchcraft which became a convention in anthropology. However, some researchers argue that the general adoption of Evans-Pritchard's definitions constrained discussion of witchcraft beliefs, and even broader discussion of magic and religion, in ways that his work does not support. Evans-Pritchard reserved the term "witchcraft" for the actions of those who inflict harm by their inborn power and used "sorcery" for those who needed tools to do so. Historians found these definitions difficult to apply to European witchcraft, where witches were believed to use physical techniques, as well as some who were believed to cause harm by thought alone. The distinction "has now largely been abandoned, although some anthropologists still sometimes find it relevant to the particular societies with which they are concerned".

While most cultures believe witchcraft to be something willful, some Indigenous peoples in Africa and Melanesia believe witches have a substance or an evil spirit in their bodies that drives them to do harm. Such substances may be believed to act on their own while the witch is sleeping or unaware. The Dobu people believe women work harmful magic in their sleep while men work it while awake. Further, in cultures where substances within the body are believed to grant supernatural powers, the substance may be good, bad, or morally neutral. Hutton draws a distinction between those who unwittingly cast the evil eye and those who deliberately do so, describing only the latter as witches.

The universal or cross-cultural validity of the terms "witch" and "witchcraft" are debated. Hutton states:

[Malevolent magic] is, however, only one current usage of the word. In fact, Anglo-American senses of it now take at least four different forms, although the one discussed above seems still to be the most widespread and frequent. The others define the witch figure as any person who uses magic ... or as the practitioner of nature-based Pagan religion; or as a symbol of independent female authority and resistance to male domination. All have validity in the present.

According to the United Nations Special Rapporteur on Extrajudicial, Summary or Arbitrary Executions there is "difficulty of defining 'witches' and 'witchcraft' across cultures—terms that, quite apart from their connotations in popular culture, may include an array of traditional or faith healing practices".

Anthropologist Fiona Bowie notes that the terms "witchcraft" and "witch" are used differently by scholars and the general public in at least four ways. Neopagan writer Isaac Bonewits proposed dividing witches into even more distinct types including, but not limited to: Neopagan, Feminist, Neogothic, Neoclassical, Classical, Family Traditions, Immigrant Traditions, and Ethnic.

== Etymology ==
The word "witchcraft" is over a thousand years old: Old English formed the compound wiccecræft from wicce ('witch') and cræft ('craft'). The masculine form was wicca ('male sorcerer').

According to the Oxford English Dictionary, wicce and wicca were probably derived from the Old English verb wiccian, meaning 'to practice witchcraft'. Wiccian has a cognate in Middle Low German wicken (attested from the 13th century). The further etymology of this word is problematic. It has no clear cognates in other Germanic languages outside of English and Low German, and there are numerous possibilities for the Indo-European root from which it may have derived.

Another Old English word for 'witch' was hægtes or hægtesse, which became the modern English word "hag" and is linked to the word "hex". In most other Germanic languages, their word for 'witch' comes from the same root as these; for example German Hexe and Dutch heks.

In colloquial modern English, the word witch is particularly used for women. A male practitioner of magic or witchcraft is more commonly called a 'wizard', or sometimes, 'warlock'. When the word witch is used to refer to a member of a neopagan tradition or religion (such as Wicca), it can refer to a person of any gender.

== Beliefs about practices ==
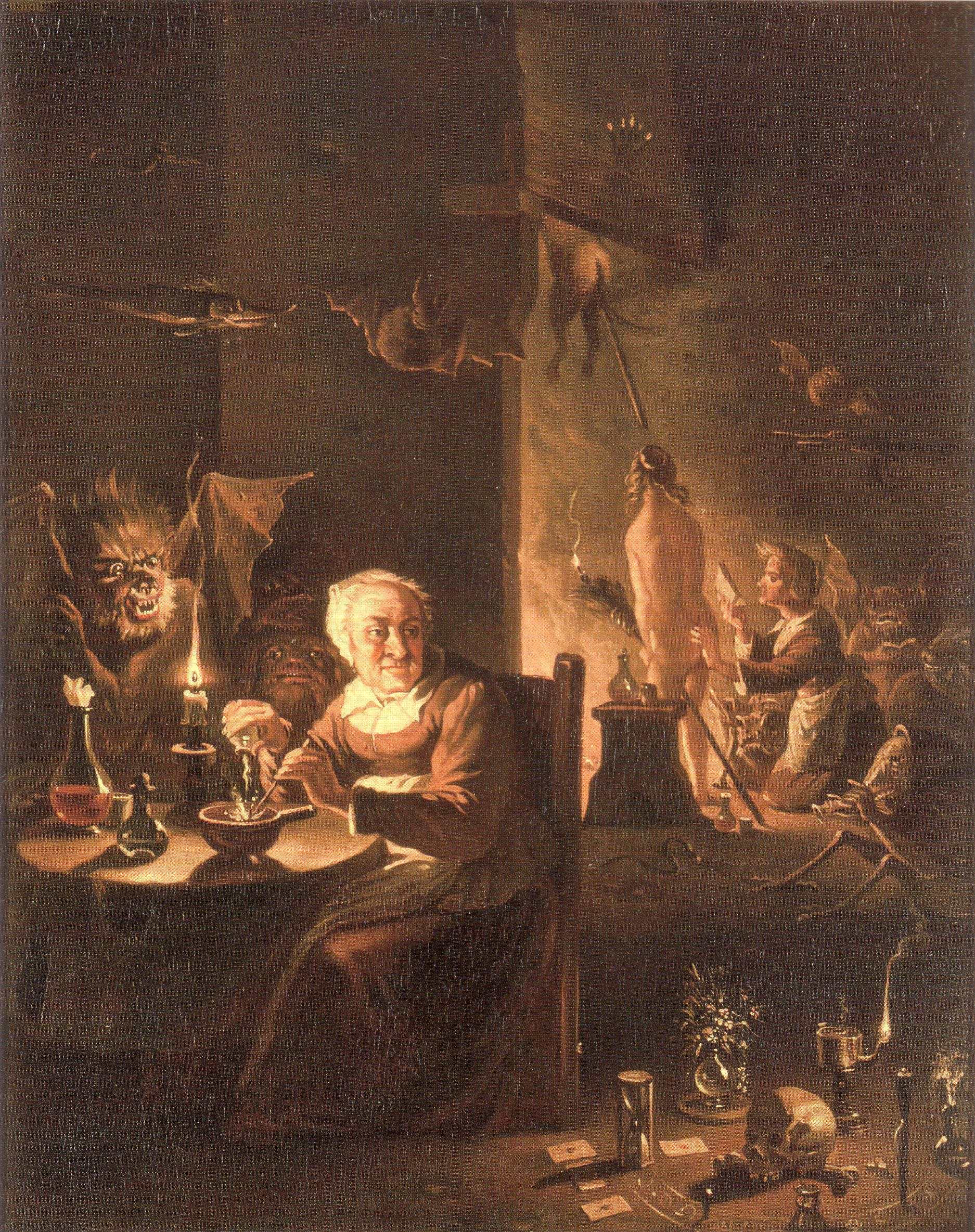
Preparation for the Witches' Sabbath by David Teniers the Younger. It shows a witch brewing a potion overlooked by her familiar spirit or a demon; items on the floor for casting a spell; and another witch reading from a grimoire while anointing the buttocks of a young witch about to fly upon an inverted besom.

Witches are commonly believed to cast curses; a spell or set of magical words and gestures intended to inflict supernatural harm. Cursing could also involve inscribing runes or sigils on an object to give that object magical powers; burning or binding a wax or clay image (a poppet) of a person to affect them magically; or using herbs, animal parts and other substances to make potions or poisons. Witchcraft has been blamed for many kinds of misfortune. In Europe, by far the most common kind of harm attributed to witchcraft was illness or death suffered by adults, their children, or their animals. "Certain ailments, like impotence in men, infertility in women, and lack of milk in cows, were particularly associated with witchcraft". Illnesses that were poorly understood were more likely to be blamed on witchcraft. Edward Bever writes: "Witchcraft was particularly likely to be suspected when a disease came on unusually swiftly, lingered unusually long, could not be diagnosed clearly, or presented some other unusual symptoms".

A common belief in cultures worldwide is that witches tend to use something from their target's body to work magic against them; for example hair, nail clippings, clothing, or bodily waste. Such beliefs are found in Europe, Africa, South Asia, Polynesia, Melanesia, and North America. Another widespread belief among Indigenous peoples in Africa and North America is that witches cause harm by introducing cursed magical objects into their victim's body; such as small bones or ashes. James George Frazer described this kind of magic as imitative. (Note: "If we analyze the principles of thought on which magic is based, they will probably be found to resolve themselves into two: first, that like produces like, or that an effect resembles its cause; and, second, that things which have once been in contact with each other continue to act on each other at a distance after the physical contact has been severed. The former principle may be called the Law of Similarity, the latter the Law of Contact or Contagion. From the first of these principles, namely the Law of Similarity, the magician infers that he can produce any effect he desires merely by imitating it: from the second he infers that whatever he does to a material object will affect equally the person with whom the object was once in contact, whether it formed part of his body or not.")

In some cultures, witches are believed to use human body parts in magic, and they are commonly believed to murder children for this purpose. In Europe, "cases in which women did undoubtedly kill their children, because of what today would be called postpartum psychosis, were often interpreted as yielding to diabolical temptation".

Witches are believed to work in secret, sometimes alone and sometimes with other witches. Hutton writes: "Across most of the world, witches have been thought to gather at night, when normal humans are inactive, and also at their most vulnerable in sleep". In most cultures, witches at these gatherings are thought to transgress social norms by engaging in cannibalism, incest and open nudity.

Witches around the world commonly have associations with animals. Rodney Needham identified this as a defining feature of the witch archetype. In some parts of the world, it is believed witches can shapeshift into animals, or that the witch's spirit travels apart from their body and takes an animal form, an activity often associated with shamanism. Another widespread belief is that witches have an animal helper. In English these are often called "familiars", and meant an evil spirit or demon that had taken an animal form. As researchers examined traditions in other regions, they widened the term to servant spirit-animals which are described as a part of the witch's own soul.

Necromancy is the practice of conjuring the spirits of the dead for divination or prophecy, although the term has also been applied to raising the dead for other purposes. The biblical Witch of Endor performed it (1 Samuel 28th chapter), and it is among the witchcraft practices condemned by Ælfric of Eynsham: "Witches still go to cross-roads and to heathen burials with their delusive magic and call to the devil; and he comes to them in the likeness of the man that is buried there, as if he arises from death."

J.D. Krige argues that belief in witchcraft also serves various functions. One such function, he notes, is psychological: it enables people to account for failures not as a result of any fault of their own but due to the doings of others or other external malevolent forces. In this way, people can "compensate for their inadequacy and continue to feel that they are masters of their own fate".

== Witchcraft and folk healers ==
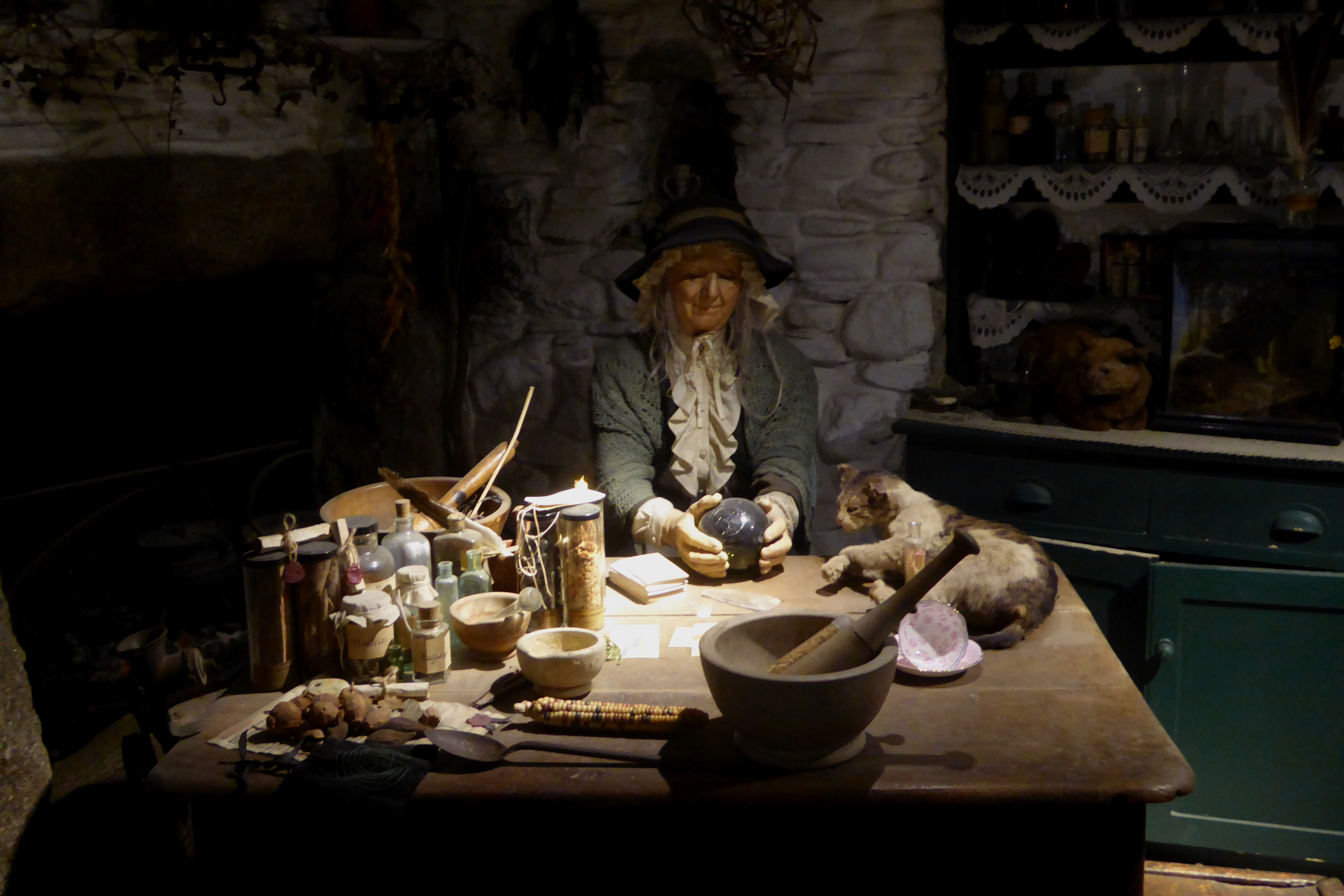
Diorama of a cunning woman or wise woman in the Museum of Witchcraft and Magic

Most societies that have believed in harmful or black magic have also believed in helpful or white magic. Where belief in harmful magic is common, it is typically forbidden by law as well as hated and feared by the general populace, while helpful or apotropaic (protective) magic is tolerated or accepted by the population, even if the orthodox establishment opposes it.

In these societies, practitioners of helpful magic provide (or provided) services such as breaking the effects of witchcraft, healing, divination, finding lost or stolen goods, and love magic. In Britain, and some other parts of Europe, they were commonly known as 'cunning folk' or 'wise people'. Alan Macfarlane wrote that while cunning folk is the usual name, some are also known as 'blessers' or 'wizards', but might also be known as 'white', 'good', or 'unbinding witches'. Historian Owen Davies says the term "white witch" was rarely used before the 20th century. Ronald Hutton uses the general term "service magicians". Often these people were involved in identifying alleged witches.

Such helpful magic-workers "were normally contrasted with the witch who practiced maleficium—that is, magic used for harmful ends". In the early years of the European witch hunts "the cunning folk were widely tolerated by church, state and general populace". Some of the more hostile churchmen and secular authorities tried to smear folk-healers and magic-workers by falsely branding them 'witches' and associating them with harmful 'witchcraft', but generally the masses did not accept this and continued to make use of their services. The English MP and skeptic Reginald Scot sought to disprove magic and witchcraft altogether, writing in The Discoverie of Witchcraft (1584), "At this day, it is indifferent to say in the English tongue, 'she is a witch' or 'she is a wise woman'". Historian Keith Thomas adds "Nevertheless, it is possible to isolate that kind of 'witchcraft' which involved the employment (or presumed employment) of some occult means of doing harm to other people in a way which was generally disapproved of. In this sense the belief in witchcraft can be defined as the attribution of misfortune to occult human agency".

Emma Wilby says folk magicians in Europe were viewed ambivalently by communities, and were considered as capable of harming as of healing, which could lead to their being accused as malevolent witches. She suggests some English "witches" convicted of consorting with demons may have been cunning folk whose supposed fairy familiars had been demonised.

Hutton says that magical healers "were sometimes denounced as witches, but seem to have made up a minority of the accused in any area studied". Likewise, Davies says "relatively few cunning-folk were prosecuted under secular statutes for witchcraft" and were dealt with more leniently than alleged witches. The Constitutio Criminalis Carolina (1532) of the Holy Roman Empire, and the Danish Witchcraft Act of 1617, stated that workers of folk magic should be dealt with differently from witches. It was suggested by Richard Horsley that 'diviner-healers' (devins-guerisseurs) made up a significant proportion of those tried for witchcraft in France and Switzerland, but more recent surveys conclude that they made up less than 2% of the accused. However, Éva Pócs says that half the accused witches in Hungary seem to have been healers, and Kathleen Stokker says the "vast majority" of Norway's accused witches were folk healers.

== Witch-hunts and thwarting witchcraft ==
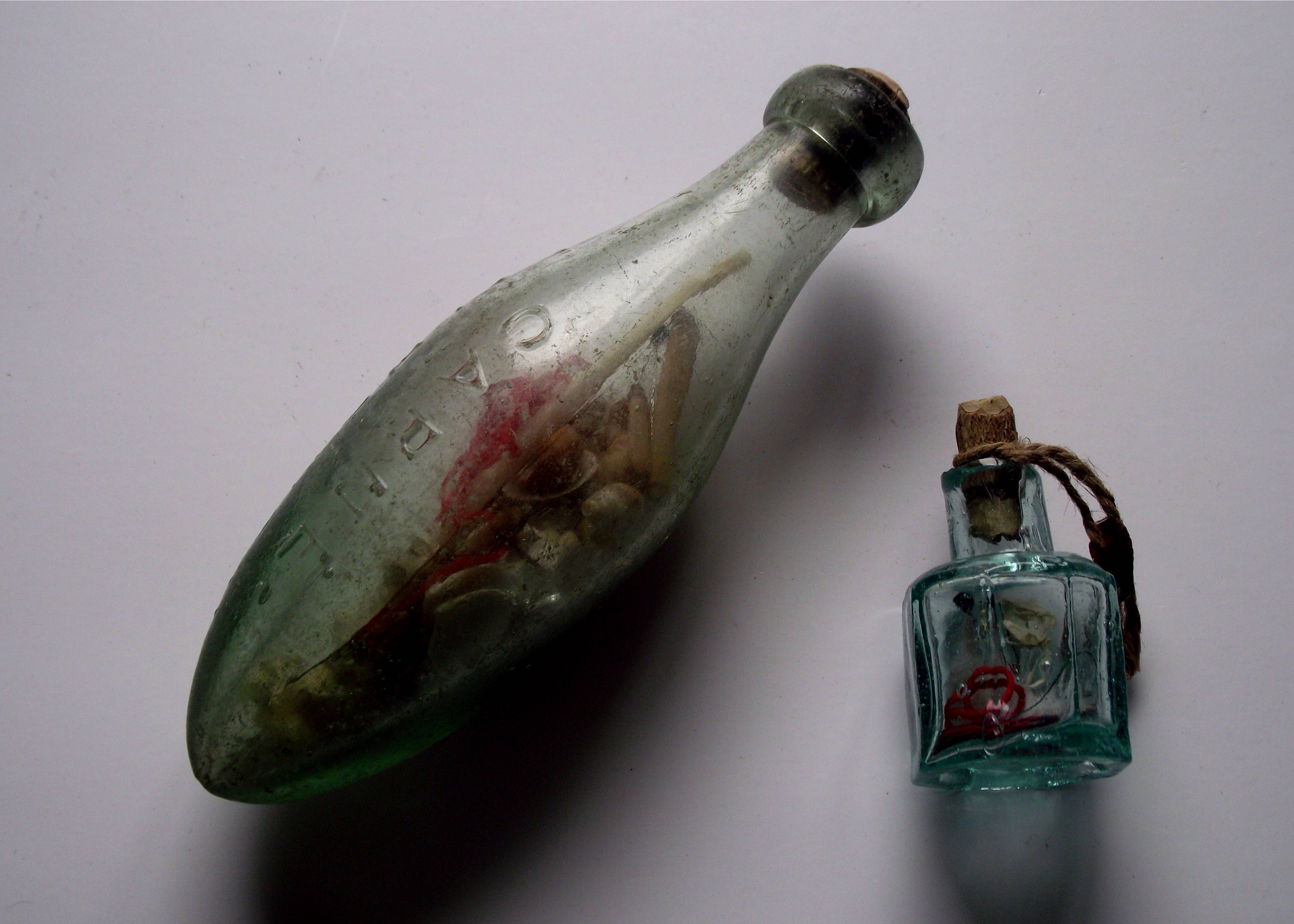
A witch bottle, used as counter-magic against witchcraft

Societies that believe (or believed) in witchcraft may also believe that it can be thwarted in various ways. One common way is to use protective magic or counter-magic, often with the help of magical healers such as cunning folk or witch-doctors. This includes performing rituals, reciting charms, or the use of talismans, amulets, anti-witch marks, witch bottles, witch balls, and burying objects such as horse skulls inside the walls of buildings. Another believed cure for bewitchment is to persuade or force the alleged witch to lift their spell. Often, people have attempted to thwart the witchcraft by physically punishing the alleged witch, such as by banishing, wounding, torturing or killing them. Hutton wrote that "In most societies, however, a formal and legal remedy was preferred to this sort of private action", whereby the alleged witch would be prosecuted and then formally punished if found guilty.

=== Accusations of witchcraft ===
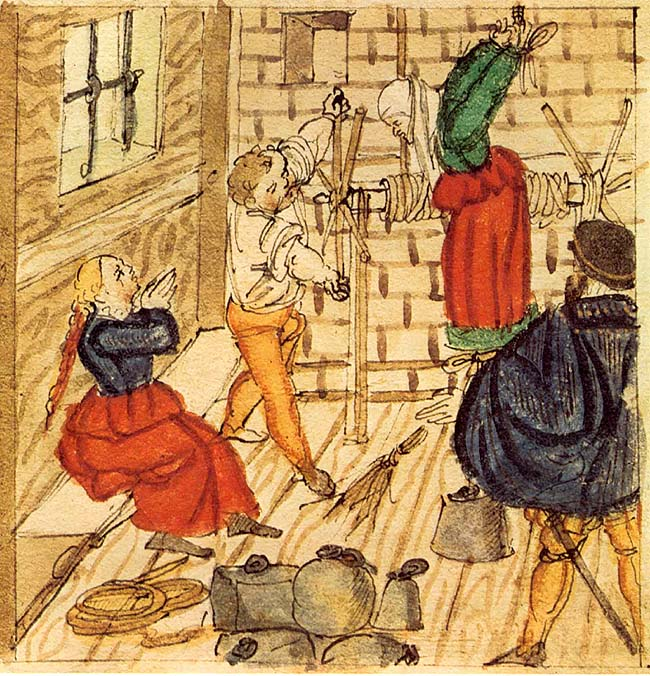
The torture used against accused witches, 1577

Throughout the world, accusations of witchcraft are often linked to social and economic tensions. Females are most often accused, especially in more male-dominated societies like 16th-century America. However, in some cultures it was mostly males, such as in 17th-century Iceland. In many societies, accusations are directed mainly against the elderly, but in others age is not a factor, and in some cultures it is mainly adolescents who are accused.

Éva Pócs writes that reasons for accusations of witchcraft fall into four general categories. The first three of which were proposed by Richard Kieckhefer, and the fourth added by Christina Larner:

1. A person was caught in the act of positive or negative sorcery
2. A well-meaning sorcerer or healer lost their clients' or the authorities' trust
3. A person did nothing more than gain the enmity of their neighbors
4. A person was reputed to be a witch and surrounded with an aura of witch-beliefs or occultism.

=== Modern witch-hunts ===
Witch-hunts, scapegoating, and the shunning or murder of suspected witches still occurs. Many cultures worldwide continue to have a belief in the concept of "witchcraft" or malevolent magic.

Apart from extrajudicial violence, state-sanctioned execution also occurs in some jurisdictions. For instance, in Saudi Arabia practicing witchcraft and sorcery is a crime punishable by death and the country has executed people for this crime as recently as 2014.

Witchcraft-related violence is often discussed as a serious issue in the broader context of violence against women. In Tanzania, an estimated 500 older women are murdered each year following accusations of witchcraft or accusations of being a witch, according to a 2014 World Health Organization report.

Children who live in some regions of the world, such as parts of Africa, are also vulnerable to violence stemming from witchcraft accusations. Such incidents have also occurred in immigrant communities in Britain, including the much publicized case of the murder of Victoria Climbié.

== Religious perspectives ==
=== Ancient Mesopotamian religion ===
A clay tablet from the Maqlû, outlining an ancient Akkadian anti-witchcraft ritual

Magic was an important part of ancient Mesopotamian religion and society, which distinguished between 'good' (helpful) and 'bad' (harmful) rites. In ancient Mesopotamia, practitioners mainly used counter-magic against witchcraft (kišpū); the law codes also prescribed the death penalty for those found guilty of witchcraft. According to Tzvi Abusch, ancient Mesopotamian ideas about witches and witchcraft shifted over time, and the early stages were "comparable to the archaic shamanistic stage of European witchcraft". In this early stage, witches were not necessarily considered evil, but took 'white' and 'black' forms, could help others using magic and medical knowledge, generally lived in rural areas, and sometimes exhibited ecstatic behavior.

In ancient Mesopotamia, a witch (m. kaššāpu, f. kaššāptu, from kašāpu ['to bewitch']) was "usually regarded as an anti-social and illegitimate practitioner of destructive magic ... whose activities were motivated by malice and evil intent and who was opposed by the ašipu, an exorcist or incantation-priest". These ašipu were predominantly male representatives of the state religion, whose main role was to work magic against harmful supernatural forces such as demons. The stereotypical witch mentioned in the sources tended to be those of low status who were weak or otherwise marginalized, including women, foreigners, actors, and peddlers.

The Code of Hammurabi (18th century BCE) allowed someone accused of harmful magic-practice to undergo trial by ordeal—by jumping into a holy river. If they drowned, they were deemed guilty, and the accuser inherited the guilty person's estate. If they survived, the accuser's estate was handed over instead.

The Maqlû ("burning") is an ancient Akkadian text written early in the first millennium BCE, which sets out a Mesopotamian anti-witchcraft ritual. This lengthy ritual includes invoking various gods, burning an effigy of the witch, then dousing and disposing of the remains.

=== Abrahamic religions ===
The historical development of witchcraft in the Middle East shows a multi-stage process shaped by culture, spirituality, and societal norms. Ancient witchcraft in the Middle East intertwined mysticism with nature through rituals and incantations aligned with local beliefs. The position of magic among ancient Jews and within Judaism was complex, with some forms accepted as mysticism and others disapproved of as heresy. The medieval Middle East experienced shifting perceptions of witchcraft under Islamic and Christian influences, sometimes revered for healing and other times condemned as heresy.

==== Jewish ====
Jewish attitudes toward witchcraft were rooted in its association with idolatry and necromancy, and some rabbis even practiced forms of magic themselves. References to witchcraft in the Hebrew Bible highlighted strong condemnations rooted in the "abomination" of magical practices. Christianity later similarly condemned witchcraft, considering it an abomination and using select verses to justify witch hunting during the early modern period.

==== Christian ====
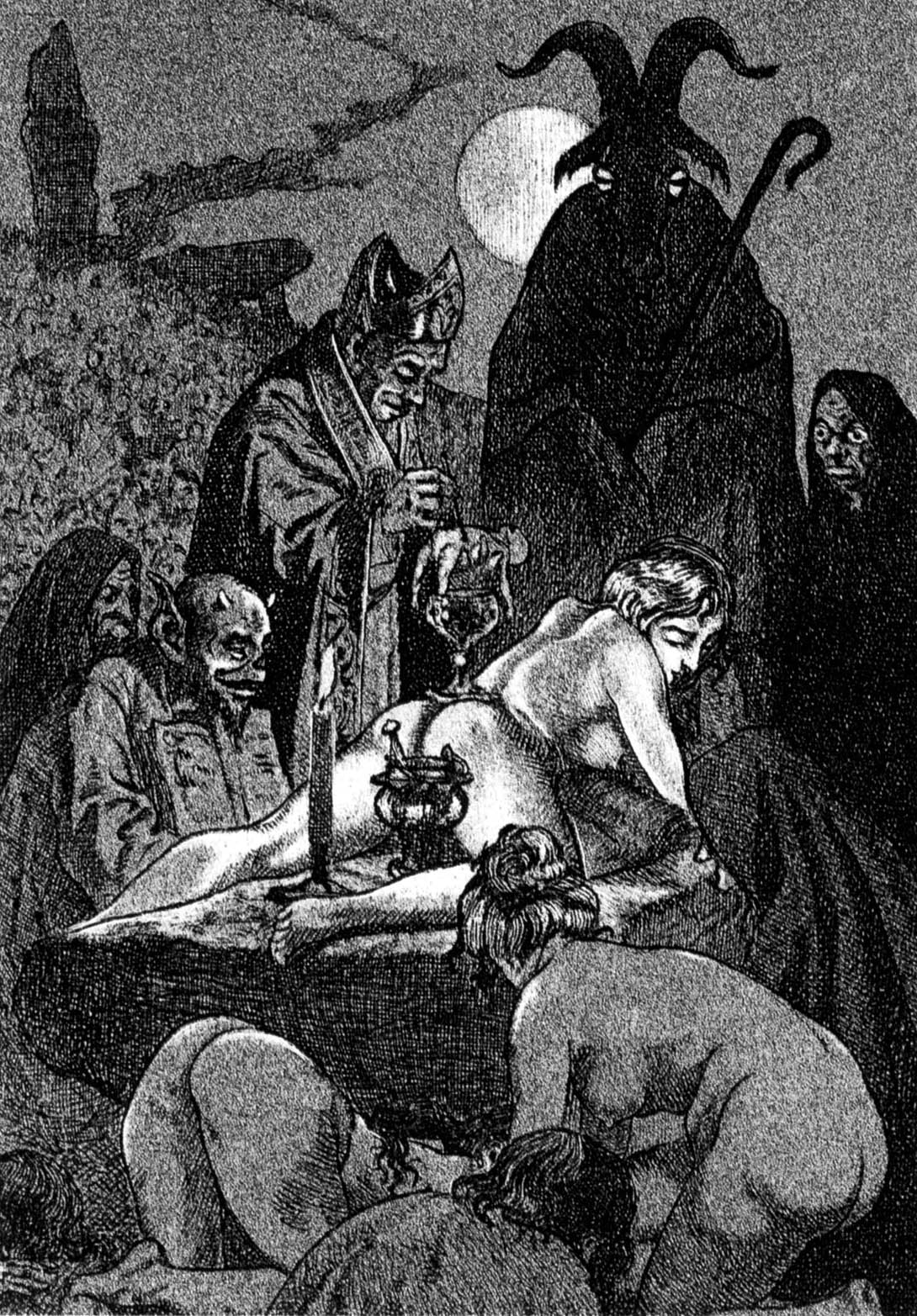
Illustration by Martin van Maële of a Witches' Sabbath and Black Mass overseen by a horned Devil, in the 1911 edition of La Sorcière, by Jules Michelet

Historically, the Christian concept of witchcraft derives from Old Testament laws against it. In medieval and early-modern Europe, many Christians believed in magic. As opposed to the helpful magic of the cunning folk, witchcraft was seen as evil and associated with Satan and devil worship. This often resulted in deaths, torture and scapegoating (casting blame for misfortune), and many years of large-scale witch trials and witch hunts, especially in Protestant Europe, before largely ending during the Age of Enlightenment. Christian views are diverse, ranging from intense belief and opposition (especially by Christian fundamentalists) to non-belief. During the Age of Colonialism, many cultures were exposed to the Western world via colonialism, usually accompanied by intensive Christian missionary activity (see Christianization). In these cultures, beliefs about witchcraft were partly influenced by the prevailing Western concepts of the time.

In Christianity, sorcery came to be associated with heresy and apostasy and was viewed as evil. Among Catholics, Protestants, and the secular leadership of late-medieval/early-modern Europe, fears about witchcraft rose to a fever pitch and sometimes led to large-scale witch hunts. The fifteenth century saw a dramatic rise in awareness and terror of witchcraft. Tens of thousands of people were executed, and others were imprisoned, tortured, banished, and had lands and possessions confiscated. The majority of those accused were women, though in some regions the majority were men. In Scots, the word warlock came to be used as the male equivalent of witch (which can be male or female, but is used predominantly for females).

The Malleus Maleficarum (Hammer of the Witches) was a witch-hunting manual written in 1486 by German monk-inquisitors Heinrich Kramer and Jacob Sprenger. It was used by both Catholics and Protestants for several hundred years, outlining how to identify a witch, what makes a woman more likely than a man to be a witch, how to put a witch on trial, and how to punish a witch. The book defines a witch as evil and typically female. It became the handbook for secular courts throughout Europe, but was not used by the Inquisition, which even cautioned against relying on it. It was the most sold book in Europe for over 100 years (after the Christian Bible).

==== Islamic ====
Islamic perspectives on magic encompass a wide range of practices, with belief in black magic and the evil eye coexisting alongside strict prohibitions against its practice. The Quran acknowledges the existence of magic and seeks protection from its harm. Islam's stance is against the practice of magic, considering it forbidden, and emphasizes miracles rather than magic or witchcraft. The historical continuity of witchcraft in the Middle East underlines the complex interaction between spiritual beliefs and societal norms across different cultures and epochs.

=== Modern paganism ===
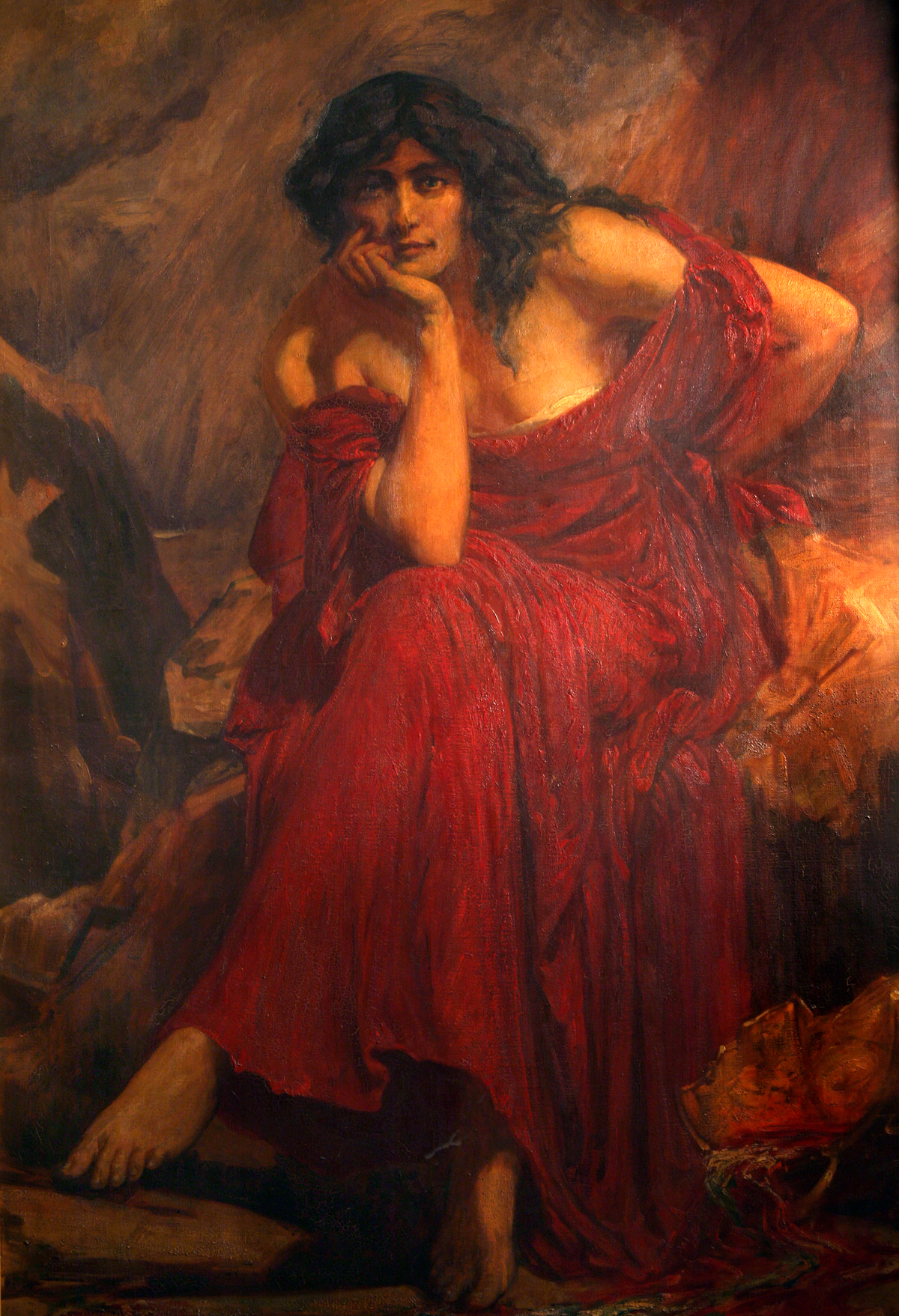
The sorceress Ceridwen of Welsh mythology is considered a Goddess in Modern paganism and Wicca.

During the 20th century, interest in witchcraft rose in English-speaking and European countries. From the 1920s, Margaret Murray popularized the 'witch-cult hypothesis': the idea that those persecuted as 'witches' in early modern Europe were followers of a benevolent pagan religion that had survived the Christianization of Europe. This has been discredited by further historical research.

From the 1930s, occult neopagan groups began to emerge who called their religion a kind of 'witchcraft'. They were initiatory secret societies inspired by Murray's 'witch cult' theory, ceremonial magic, Aleister Crowley's Thelema, and historical paganism. The biggest religious movement to emerge from this is Wicca. Today, some Wiccans and members of related traditions self-identify as "witches" and use the term "witchcraft" for their magico-religious beliefs and practices, primarily in Western anglophone countries.

== Regional perspectives ==
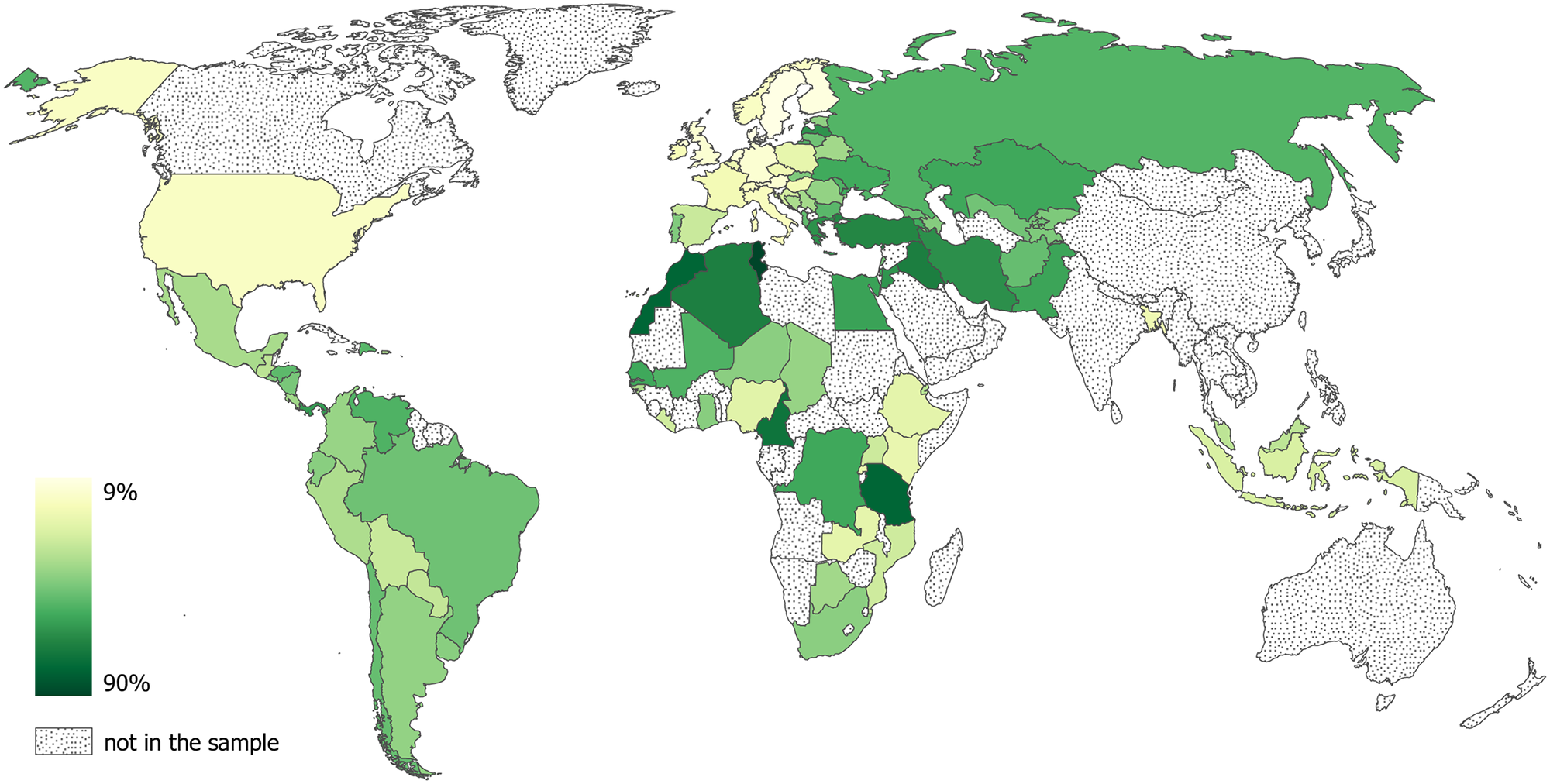
Prevalence of belief in witchcraft by country

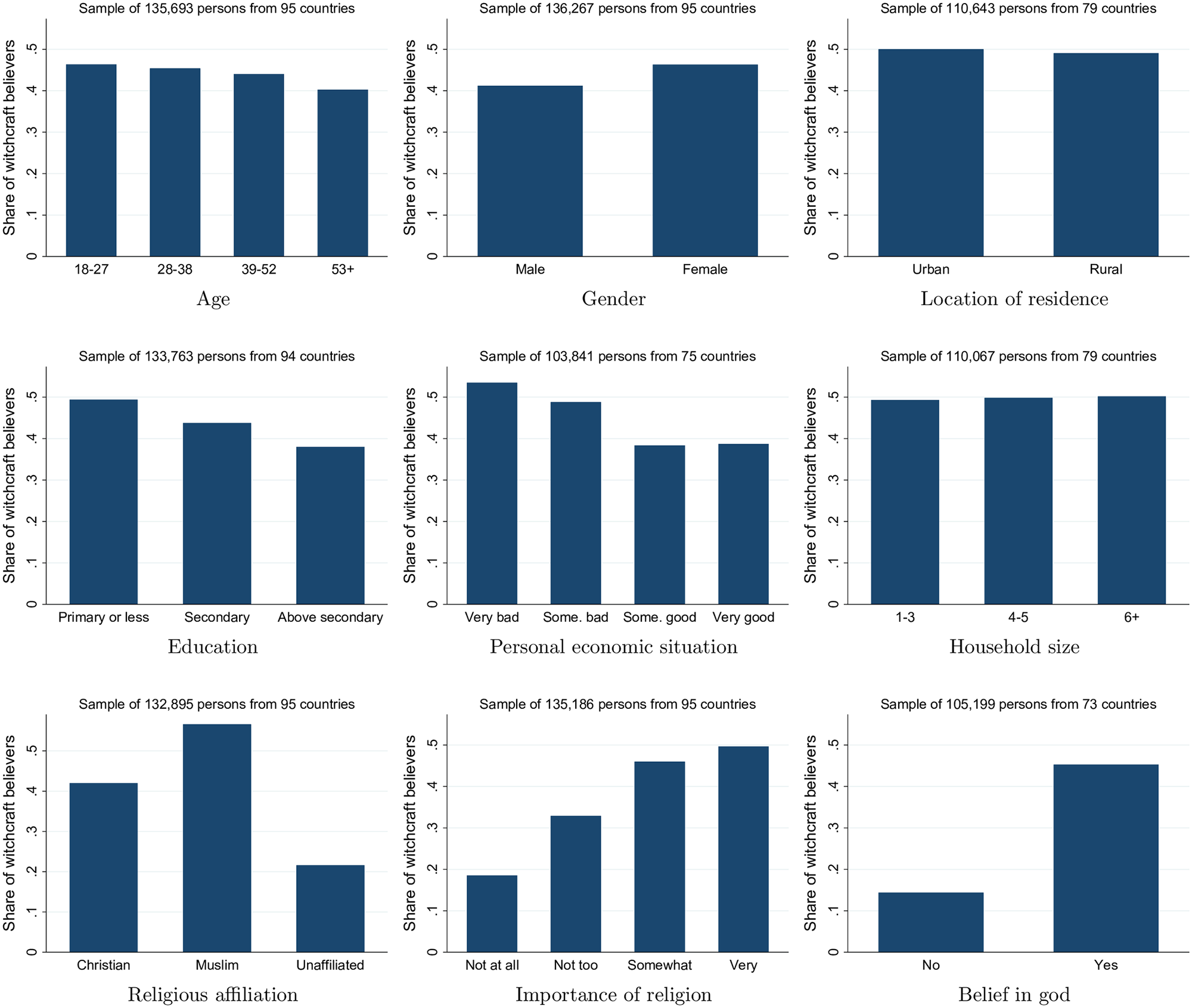
Socio-demographic correlates of witchcraft beliefs

A 2022 study found that belief in witchcraft, as in the use of malevolent magic or powers, is still widespread in some parts of the world. It found that belief in witchcraft varied from 9% of people in some countries to 90% in others, and was linked to cultural and socioeconomic factors. Stronger belief in witchcraft correlated with poorer economic development, weak institutions, lower levels of education, lower life expectancy, lower life satisfaction, and high religiosity.

It contrasted two hypotheses about future changes in witchcraft belief:

- witchcraft beliefs should decline "in the process of development due to improved security and health, lower exposure to shocks, spread of education and scientific approach to explaining life events" according to standard modernization theory
- "some aspects of development, namely rising inequality, globalization, technological change, and migration, may instead revive witchcraft beliefs by disrupting established social order" according to literature largely inspired by observations from Sub-Saharan Africa.

=== Africa ===
In Africa, beliefs and practices surrounding witchcraft varies both historically and between local groups, though such conceptualisations share in common the notion of certain individuals using supernatural powers to purposefully harm others. The term witchcraft has been criticised by some anthropologists for obfuscating local variations. E. E. Evans-Pritchard, an early-20th century English anthropologist who studied Azande witchcraft, differentiated between "witchcraft" (a metaphysical substance inside certain people that flew about at night and harmed others) and "sorcery" (the learned, instrumental use of spells, rituals, or medicines to cause harm to others). South African anthropologist Monica Wilson wrote that witchcraft was the inversion of accepted behavioural norms, and the "wilful misdirection of the mystical powers" innate to each person. Zambian historian Mutumba Mainga wrote that witchcraft and divination "may be described as a denial, rather than a form, of religion", as they reject sacredness and worship, and said that they serve to give adherents control over their lives. Other scholars have argued that witchcraft is religious, though according to anthropologist James H. Smith this is not the commonly-held view in African societies.

In much of Africa, witchcraft constitutes an important dimension of social reality, and is intertwined with politics and economics. Evans-Pritchard argued that, contrary to colonial authorities who viewed African belief in witchcraft as "backward" and "irrational", it is rational and compatible with empirical evidence as it addresses "why" misfortune occurs rather than "how", and has a coherent logical system. However, most social science works imply witchcraft is not real, and that the beliefs constitute metaphors or metonymy (according to Smith, recent anthropologists avoid being explicit due to wariness around paternalism). Early generations of scholars emphasised African belief in witchcraft as functioning to maintain "social and cosmological order", as the threat of accusations of witchcraft encourages social togetherness, while accusations themselves serve as a medium through which to voice grievances. Witches are considered to be motivated by, among other reasons, envy (rooted in a zero-sum worldview due to scarce resources), enforcement of norms, revenge, or antisocial tendencies, while accusations can similarly be motivated by envy or high economic inequality, rivalry, retribution, or other easily recognisable social factors. Trials by ordeal or divination are sometimes used to help identify witches, and accused witches are often ostracised or subject to physical harm such as assault or murder. Vulnerable groups are often the target of accusations, such as older women and widows who are viewed as behaving "oddly", and sometimes abnormal or unwanted children. With the decline in power of traditional/precolonial-era courts and customary law, failure to incorporate witchcraft beliefs into national/state legal systems (along with colonial-era laws that criminalise accusations) has led to an increase in vigilante witch-killings and mob violence, which tends to get substantial media coverage.

More recent scholars have interpreted African witchcraft as critical social commentary on modernity and postcolonial capitalism and violence, possibly influenced by the values of reciprocity in kinship systems. Witchcraft is often associated with the rich and powerful, namely the abuse of power and the "accumulation of wealth without sweat". Dutch anthropologist W.M.J. Van Binsbergen differentiated between "anti-personal" and "impersonal" witchcraft, where anti-personal witchcraft involves misfortunes caused by another person with whom there is existing tension, while impersonal witchcraft constitutes "the reckless manipulation of human material for strictly individual purposes". Female witches are generally ostracised, while male witches (or "wizards") who hold public positions are tolerated as they are considered too powerful to curtail. Witchcraft is not viewed as only affecting African societies, but as a global phenomenon; ideologies and practices that contribute to development in Western societies such as individualism, privatisation, and land expropriation are often viewed as "forms and/or engines of witchcraft". Several scholars have argued that belief in witchcraft has had a negative effect on development, and practical-theologist Frederick Kakwata has advocated for pastors to consider the spiritual dimension of poverty among those affected. David Ngong, a scholar of African Christianity, has lamented what he views as anthropologists' and Christian preachers' legitimisation and normalisation of witchcraft, describing it as a worldview that "is not conducive to the economic development of the continent and its enhanced position in the modern world".

=== Americas ===
==== North America ====
North America hosts a diverse array of beliefs about witchcraft, some of which have evolved through interactions between cultures.

Native American peoples such as the Cherokee, Hopi, the Navajo among others, believed in malevolent "witch" figures who could harm their communities by supernatural means; this was often punished harshly, including by execution. In these communities, medicine people were healers and protectors against witchcraft.

The term "witchcraft" arrived with European colonists, along with European views on witchcraft. This term would be adopted by many Indigenous communities for their own beliefs about harmful magic and harmful supernatural powers. Witch hunts took place among Christian European settlers in colonial America and the United States, most infamously the Salem witch trials in Massachusetts. These trials led to the execution of numerous individuals accused of practicing witchcraft. Despite changes in laws and perspectives over time, accusations of witchcraft persisted into the 19th century in some regions, such as Tennessee, where prosecutions occurred as late as 1833.

Some North American witchcraft beliefs were influenced by beliefs about witchcraft in Latin America, and by African witchcraft beliefs through the slave trade. Native American cultures adopted the term for their own witchcraft beliefs. Neopagan witchcraft practices such as Wicca then emerged in the mid-20th century.

==== Latin America ====
Witchcraft beliefs in Latin America are influenced by Spanish Catholic, Indigenous, and African beliefs. In Colonial Mexico, the Mexican Inquisition showed little concern for witchcraft; the Spanish Inquisitors treated witchcraft accusations as a "religious problem that could be resolved through confession and absolution". Anthropologist Ruth Behar writes that Mexican Inquisition cases "hint at a fascinating conjecture of sexuality, witchcraft, and religion, in which Spanish, indigenous, and African cultures converged". There are cases where European women and Indigenous women were accused of collaborating to work "love magic" or "sexual witchcraft" against men in colonial Mexico. According to anthropology professor Laura Lewis, "witchcraft" in colonial Mexico represented an "affirmation of hegemony" for women and especially Indigenous women over their white male counterparts in the casta system.

Belief in witchcraft is a constant in the history of colonial Brazil, for example the several denunciations and confessions given to the Congregation for the Doctrine of the Faith of Bahia (1591–1593), Pernambuco and Paraíba (1593–1595).

Brujería, often called a Latin American form of witchcraft, is a syncretic Afro-Caribbean tradition that combines Indigenous religious and magical practices from the Caribbean, together with Catholicism, and European witchcraft. The tradition and terminology is considered to encompass both helpful and harmful practices. A male practitioner is called a brujo, a female practitioner, a bruja. Healers may be further distinguished by the terms kurioso or kuradó, a man or woman who performs trabou chikí ("little works") and trabou grandi ("large treatments") to promote or restore health, bring fortune or misfortune, deal with unrequited love, and more serious concerns. Sorcery usually involves reference to an entity referred to as the almasola or homber chiki.

=== Asia ===
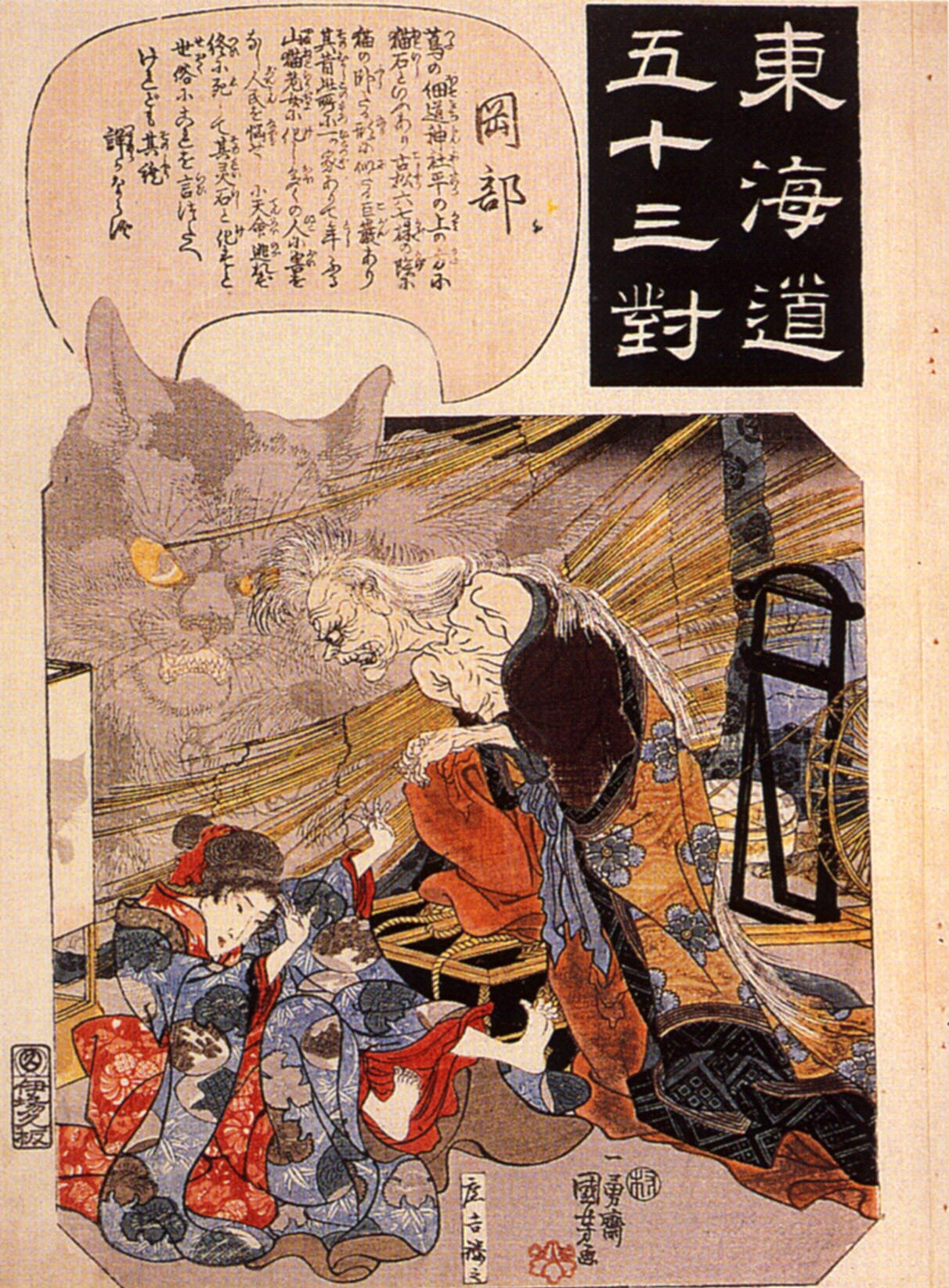
Okabe – The cat witch, by Utagawa Kuniyoshi

==== East Asia ====
In Chinese culture, the practice of Gong Tau involves black magic for purposes such as revenge and financial assistance. Japanese folklore features witch figures who employ foxes as familiars. Korean history includes instances of individuals being condemned for using spells. The Philippines has its own tradition of Philippine witches, distinct from Western portrayals, with their practices often countered by indigenous Philippine shamans.

==== Middle East ====
Witchcraft beliefs in the Middle East have a long history, and magic was a part of the ancient cultures and religions of the region.

In ancient Mesopotamia (Sumeria, Assyria, Babylonia), a witch (m. kaššāpu, f. kaššāptu) was "usually regarded as an anti-social and illegitimate practitioner of destructive magic ... motivated by malice and evil intent". Ancient Mesopotamian societies mainly used counter-magic against witchcraft (kišpū), but the law codes also prescribed the death penalty for those found guilty of witchcraft.

For the ancient Hittites, magic could only be sanctioned by the state, and accusations of witchcraft were often used to control political enemies.

As the ancient Hebrews focused on their worship on Yahweh, Judaism clearly distinguished between forms of magic and mystical practices which were accepted, and those which were viewed as forbidden or heretical, and thus "witchcraft".

In the medieval Middle East, under Islamic and Christian influences, witchcraft's perception fluctuated between healing and heresy, revered by some and condemned by others. In the present day diverse witchcraft communities have emerged.

=== Europe ===
==== Ancient Roman world ====
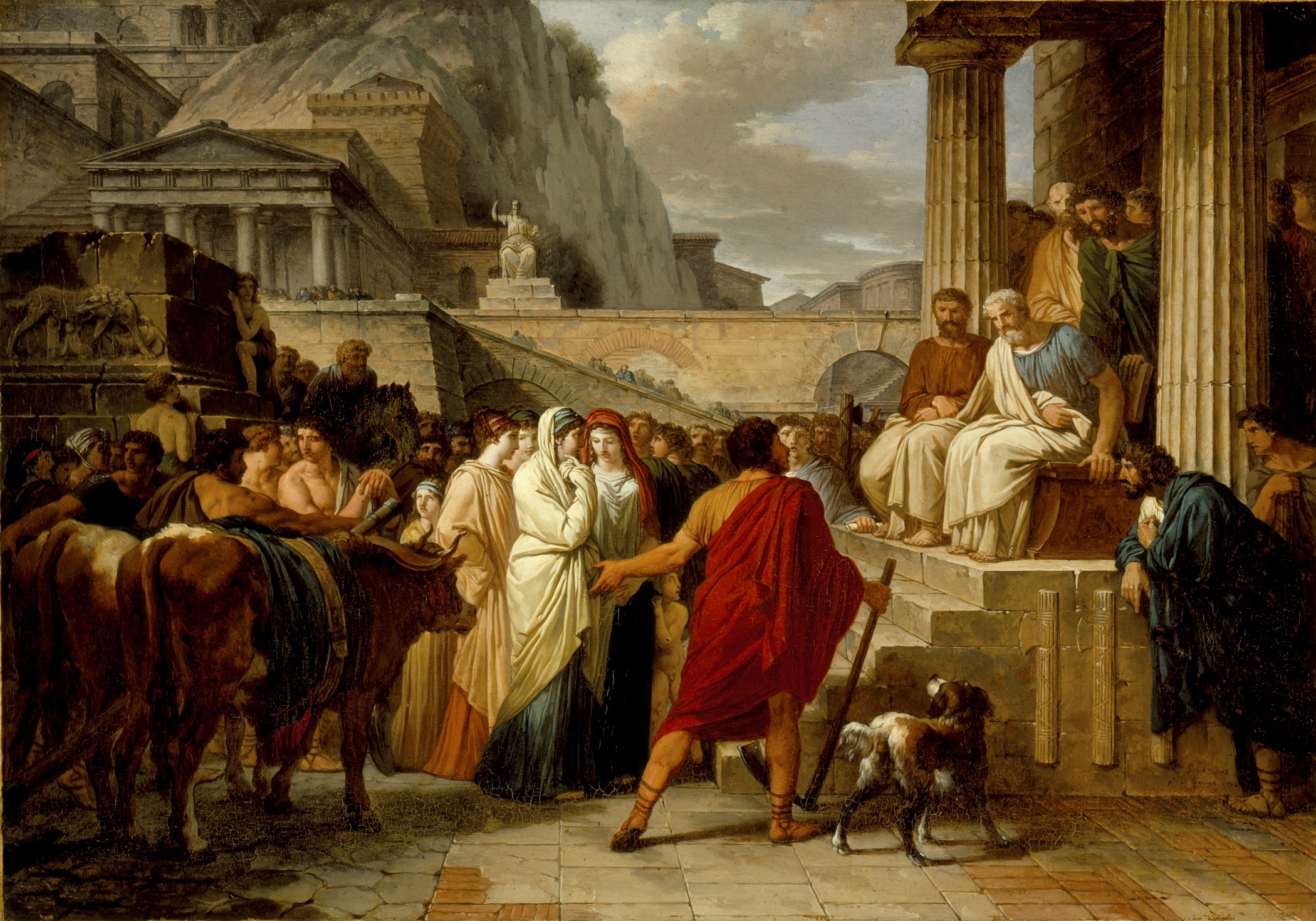
Caius Furius Cressinus Accused of Sorcery, Jean-Pierre Saint-Ours, 1792

European belief in witchcraft can be traced back to classical antiquity, when concepts of magic and religion were closely related. During the pagan era of ancient Rome, there were laws against harmful magic. According to Pliny, the 5th century BCE laws of the Twelve Tables laid down penalties for uttering harmful incantations and for stealing the fruitfulness of someone else's crops by magic. The only recorded trial involving this law was that of Gaius Furius Cresimus.

The Classical Latin word veneficium meant both poisoning and causing harm by magic (such as magic potions), although ancient people would not have distinguished between the two. In 331 BCE, a deadly epidemic hit Rome and at least 170 women were executed for causing it by veneficium. In 184–180 BCE, another epidemic hit Italy, and about 5,000 were executed for veneficium. If the reports are accurate, writes Hutton, "then the Republican Romans hunted witches on a scale unknown anywhere else in the ancient world".

Under the Lex Cornelia de sicariis et veneficis of 81 BCE, killing by veneficium carried the death penalty. During the early Imperial era, the Lex Cornelia began to be used more broadly against other kinds of magic, including sacrifices made for evil purposes. The magicians were to be burnt at the stake.

Witch characters—women who work powerful evil magic—appear in ancient Roman literature from the first century BCE onward. They are typically hags who chant harmful incantations; make poisonous potions from herbs and the body parts of animals and humans; sacrifice children; raise the dead; can control the natural world; can shapeshift themselves and others into animals; and invoke underworld deities and spirits. They include Lucan's Erichtho, Horace's Canidia, Ovid's Dipsas, and Apuleius's Meroe.

==== Early modern and contemporary Europe ====
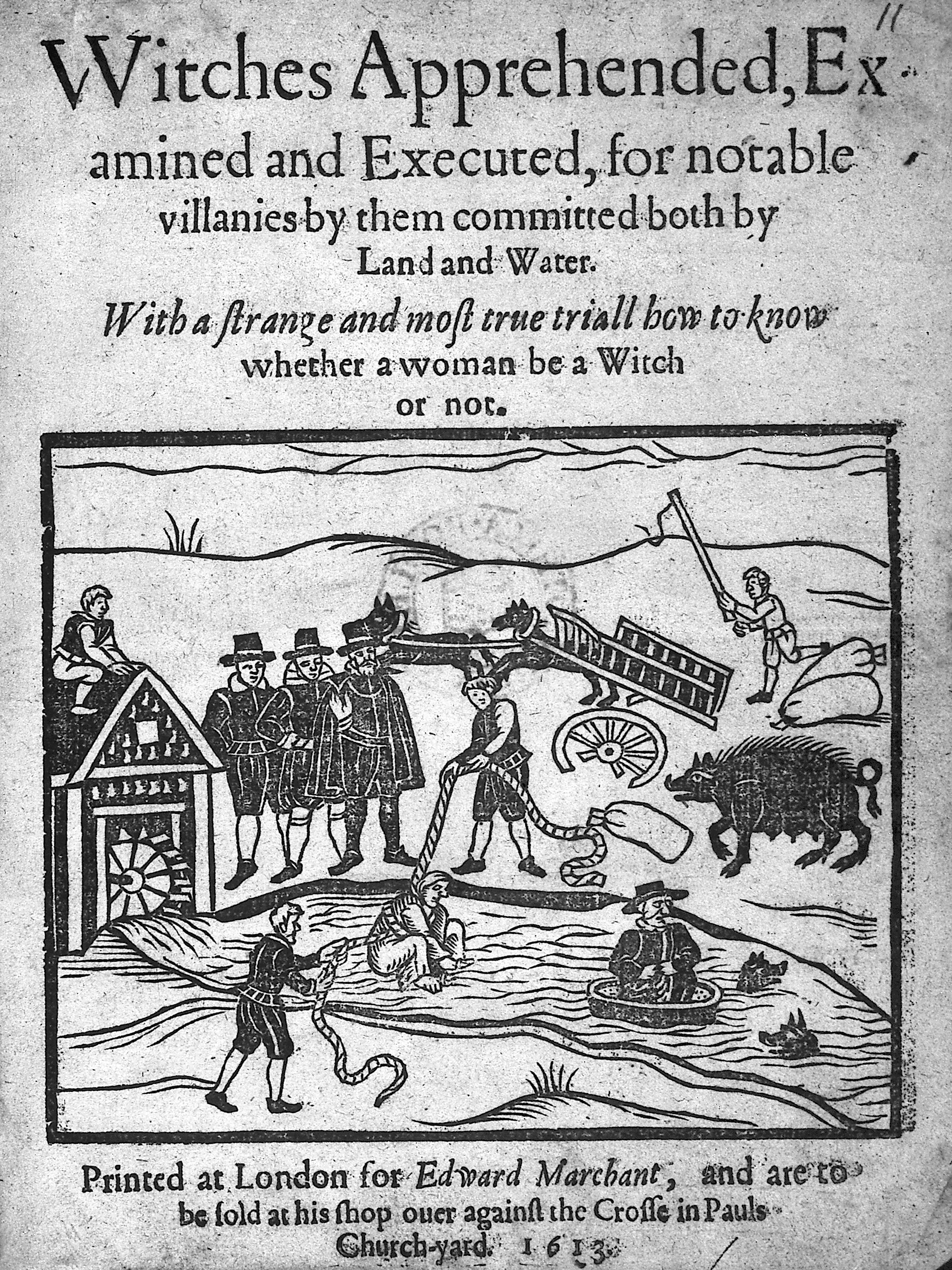
A 1613 English pamphlet showing "Witches apprehended, examined and executed"

By the early modern period, major witch hunts and witch trials began to take place in Europe, partly fueled by religious tensions, societal anxieties, and economic upheaval. One influential text was the Malleus Maleficarum, a 1486 treatise that provided a framework for identifying, prosecuting, and punishing witches. Witches were typically seen as people who caused harm or misfortune through black magic, and were sometimes believed to have made a pact with the Devil. Usually, accusations of witchcraft were made by neighbors and followed from social tensions. Accusations were often made against marginalized individuals, women, the elderly, and those who did not conform to societal norms. Women made accusations as often as men. The common people believed that magical healers (called 'cunning folk' or 'wise people') could undo bewitchment. Hutton says that magical healers were sometimes denounced as witches themselves, "but seem to have made up a minority of the accused in any area studied". The witch-craze reached its peak between the 16th and 17th centuries, resulting in the execution of tens of thousands of people. This dark period of history reflects the confluence of superstition, fear, and authority, as well as the societal tendency to find scapegoats for complex problems. A feminist interpretation of the witch trials is that misogynist views led to the association of women and malevolent witchcraft.

During the 16th century and mid 18th century Scotland had 4000-6000 prosecutions against accused witches, a much higher rate then the European average.

Russia also experienced its own iteration of witchcraft trials during the 17th century. Witches were often accused of sorcery and engaging in supernatural activities, leading to their excommunication and execution. The blending of ecclesiastical and secular jurisdictions in Russia's approach to witchcraft trials highlighted the intertwined nature of religious and political power during that time. As the 17th century progressed, the fear of witches shifted from mere superstition to a tool for political manipulation, with accusations used to target individuals who posed threats to the ruling elite.

Since the 1940s, neopagan witchcraft movements have emerged in Europe, seeking to revive and reinterpret ancient pagan and mystical practices. Wicca, pioneered by Gerald Gardner, is the most influential. Drawing inspiration from ceremonial magic, historical paganism, and the now-discredited witch-cult theory, Wicca emphasizes a connection to nature, the divine, and personal growth. Similarly, Stregheria in Italy reflects a desire to reconnect with the country's pagan past. Many of these neopagans self-identify as "witches". Neopagan witchcraft in Europe encompasses a wide range of traditions.

=== Oceania ===
Beliefs in witchcraft and sorcery are widespread across Oceania, where traditional spiritual systems often coexist with introduced religions such as Christianity. In many societies, witchcraft serves as an explanation for illness, death, or misfortune, and may be associated with social tensions or unresolved conflicts.

In the Cook Islands, the Māori term for black magic is purepure. Practitioners known as taʻunga historically served as priests, healers, and spiritual advisors. They were believed to possess sacred knowledge and were responsible for conducting rituals, healing the sick, and maintaining spiritual balance within the community.

In Papua New Guinea, belief in witchcraft—often referred to locally as sanguma—remains deeply ingrained in many communities, particularly in the Highlands region. Sorcery is commonly blamed for unexplained deaths, illness, crop failure, or other misfortunes. It is estimated that 50 to 150 people are killed each year in the country as a result of witchcraft accusations. In 2008, reports indicated that more than fifty individuals were killed in two Highlands provinces alone for allegedly practicing sorcery. Victims are often women, and attacks may involve torture, public shaming, or execution. Although the government repealed the Sorcery Act in 2013, which previously allowed sorcery as a defense in murder cases, enforcement of protective laws remains inconsistent, and community-led violence continues.

In Milne Bay Province, including the Samarai Islands, witchcraft beliefs persist, but violence against the accused is significantly lower compared to the Highlands. Anthropological research suggests that local interpretations of witchcraft in these areas are less associated with malevolence and more integrated into broader spiritual and cultural practices. This has been linked to greater social standing for women and fewer gender-based witchcraft accusations.

Other parts of Oceania, including Fiji, Tonga, and Samoa, also maintain traditions involving spiritual power and magical influence. In Fiji, for example, concepts such as valavala vakalou (spiritual acts) and traditional healing practices are still recognized in some rural areas. However, the influence of Christianity and formal legal systems has reduced the prevalence of witchcraft-related violence. In many Pacific Island societies today, witchcraft is viewed through a cultural or religious lens rather than a criminal one, and cases involving supernatural claims are more likely to be addressed through customary dispute resolution or church-based mediation.

== Witches in art and literature ==
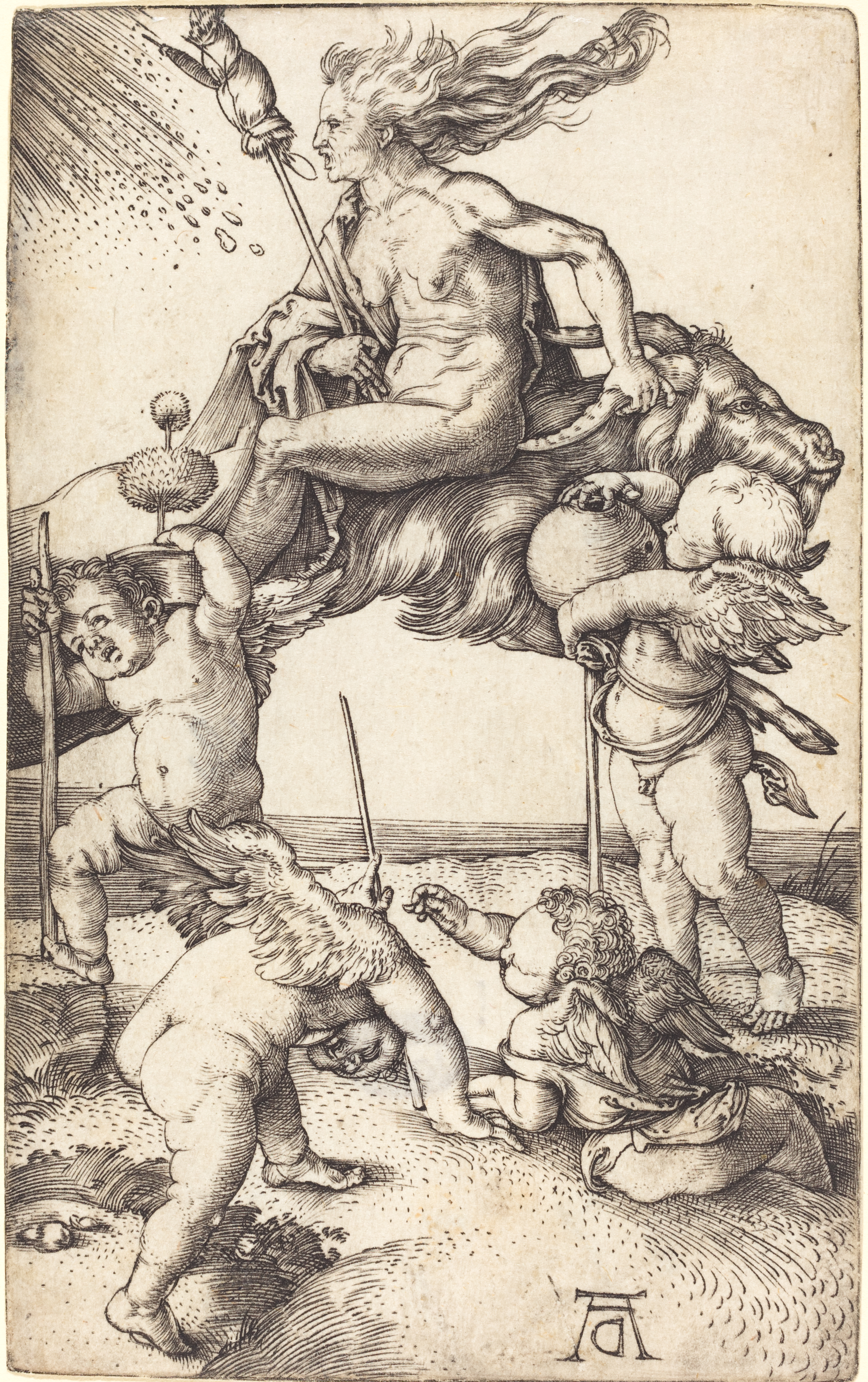
Albrecht Dürer c. 1500: Witch riding backwards on a goat

Witches have a long history of being depicted in art, although most of their earliest artistic depictions seem to originate in Early Modern Europe, particularly the Medieval and Renaissance periods. Many scholars attribute their manifestation in art as inspired by texts such as Canon Episcopi, a demonology-centered work of literature, and Malleus Maleficarum, a "witch-craze" manual published in 1487, by Heinrich Kramer and Jacob Sprenger. Witches in fiction span a wide array of characterizations. They are typically, but not always, female, and generally depicted as either villains or heroines.

== See also ==
- Aradia, or the Gospel of the Witches – 1899 book by Charles Godfrey Leland
- Feminist interpretations of witch trials in the early modern period
- Flying ointment – Hallucinogenic salve used in the practice of witchcraft
- History of goetia – History of supernatural phenomena
- Kitchen witch – Witch doll
- List of films about witchcraft
- Witches' Sabbath – Gathering of those believed to practice witchcraft
- Cunning folk
