= Witchcraft in Africa =

In Africa, witchcraft generally refers to certain individuals using hidden or invisible means, especially supernatural powers, to purposefully harm others or pursue self-interest at the expense of others, though beliefs and practices surrounding witchcraft vary both historically and between local groups. Throughout much of the continent, witchcraft constitutes an important dimension of social reality, and is often intertwined with politics and economics.

The term witchcraft has been criticised by some anthropologists for being overly generic and obfuscating local conceptualisations and practices. Monica Wilson defines witchcraft as the inversion of accepted behavioural norms, and the "wilful misdirection of the mystical powers" innate to each person. W.M.J. Binsbergen differentiated between "anti-personal witchcraft" (someone causing another's misfortunes, between whom there is existing tension) and "impersonal witchcraft" (reckless pursuit of self-interested gain through manipulation). Earlier generations of scholars emphasised African witchcraft beliefs as serving to maintain "social and cosmological order", while recent scholars have interpreted them as critical social commentary on modernity and postcolonial capitalism. Accused witches are often ostracised or subject to physical harm such as assault or murder. In parts of Africa, beliefs about illness being caused by witchcraft continue to fuel suspicion of modern medicine, with serious healthcare consequences.

In the Central African Republic, hundreds of people are convicted of witchcraft yearly, with reports of violence against accused women. In west Kenya, there have been cases of accused witches being burned to death in their homes by mobs. Malawi faces a similar issue of child witchcraft accusations, with traditional healers and some Christian counterparts involved in exorcisms, causing abandonment and abuse of children.

In Nigeria, Pentecostal pastors have intertwined Christianity with witchcraft beliefs for profit, leading to the torture and killing of accused children. Sierra Leone's Mende people see witchcraft convictions as beneficial, as the accused receive support and care from the community. In precolonial Tio society (modern-day Republic of Congo), evil was believed to be caused by spirits called apfu, and illness and death caused by witchcraft, with the threat of feuds and witchcraft accusations fostering the unity of a household or village. In Zulu culture, healers known as sangomas are believed to protect people from witchcraft and evil spirits through divination, rituals and mediumship.

== Description and analysis ==
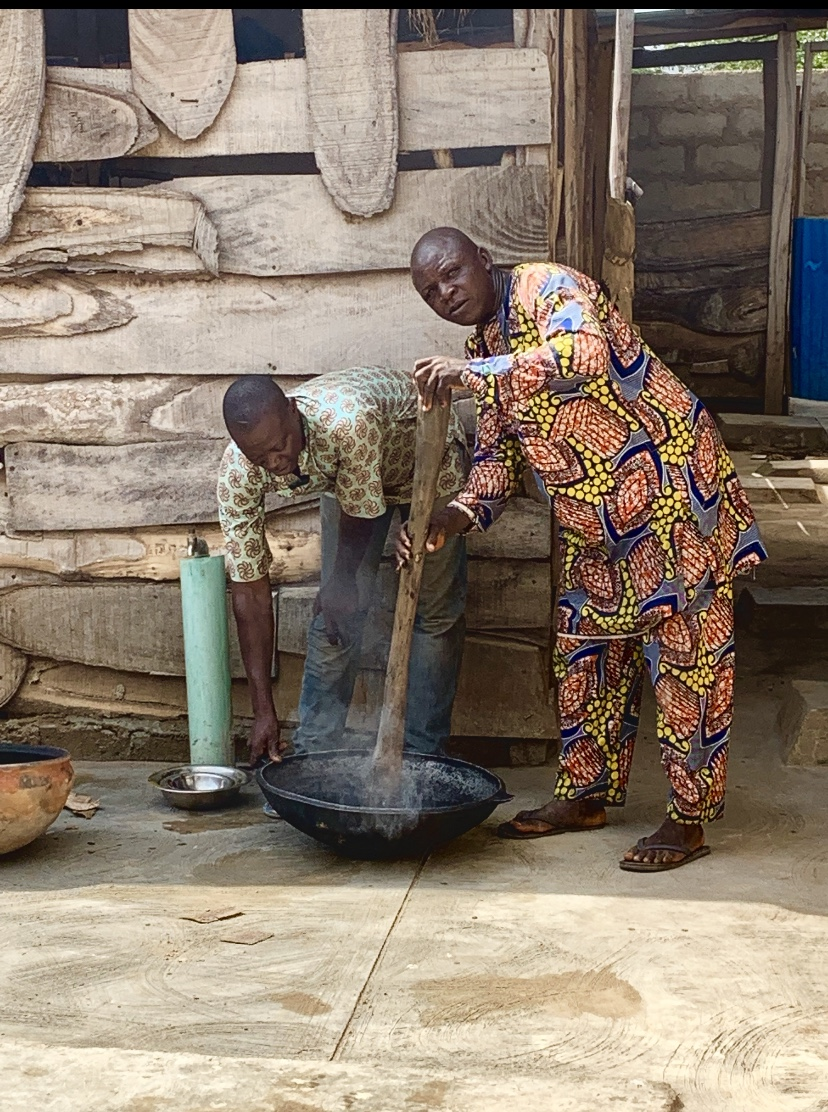
Nigerian Akose Babalawo prepares spiritual medicines recipes received from ancestral spirits for healing and removal of curses

In Africa, beliefs and practices surrounding witchcraft vary both historically and between local groups, though such conceptualisations share in common the notion of certain individuals using supernatural powers to purposefully harm others. The term witchcraft has been criticised by some anthropologists for obfuscating local variations. E. E. Evans-Pritchard, an early-20th century English anthropologist who studied Azande witchcraft, differentiated between "witchcraft" (a metaphysical substance inside certain people that flew about at night and harmed others) and "sorcery" (the learned, instrumental use of spells, rituals, or medicines to cause harm to others).

South African anthropologist Monica Wilson wrote that witchcraft was the inversion of accepted behavioural norms, and the "wilful misdirection of the mystical powers" innate to each person. Zambian historian Mutumba Mainga wrote that witchcraft and divination "may be described as a denial, rather than a form, of religion", as they reject sacredness and worship, and said that they serve to give adherents control over their lives. Other scholars have argued that witchcraft is religious, though according to anthropologist James H. Smith this is not the commonly-held view in African societies.

In much of Africa, witchcraft constitutes an important dimension of social reality, and is intertwined with politics and economics. Evans-Pritchard argued that, contrary to colonial authorities who viewed African witchcraft as "backward" and "irrational", it is rational and compatible with empirical evidence as it addresses "why" misfortune occurs rather than "how", and has a coherent logical system. However, most social science works imply witchcraft is not real, and that the beliefs constitute metaphors or metonymy (according to Smith, recent anthropologists avoid being explicit due to wariness around paternalism). Early generations of scholars emphasised African witchcraft as functioning to maintain "social and cosmological order", as the threat of witchcraft accusations encourages social togetherness, while accusations themselves serve as a medium through which to voice grievances.

Witches are thought to be motivated by, among other reasons, envy (rooted in a zero-sum worldview due to scarce resources), enforcement of norms, revenge, or antisocial tendencies, while accusations can similarly be motivated by envy or high economic inequality, rivalry, retribution, or other recognisable social factors. Vulnerable groups are often the target of accusations, such as older women and widows who are viewed as behaving "oddly", and sometimes abnormal or unwanted children.

Trials by ordeal or divination are sometimes used to help identify witches, and accused witches are often ostracised or subject to physical harm such as assault or murder. With the decline in power of traditional/precolonial-era courts and customary law, failure to incorporate witchcraft beliefs into national/state legal systems (along with colonial-era laws that criminalise accusations) has led to an increase in vigilante witch-killings and mob violence, which tends to get substantial media coverage.

Scholars in the 2000s have interpreted African witchcraft as critical social commentary on modernity and postcolonial capitalism and violence, possibly influenced by the values of reciprocity in kinship systems. Witchcraft is often associated with the rich and powerful, namely the abuse of power and the "accumulation of wealth without sweat". Dutch anthropologist W.M.J. Van Binsbergen differentiated between "anti-personal" and "impersonal" witchcraft, where anti-personal witchcraft involves misfortunes caused by another person with whom there is existing tension, while impersonal witchcraft constitutes "the reckless manipulation of human material for strictly individual purposes". Female witches are generally ostracised, while male witches (or "wizards") who hold public positions are tolerated as they are considered too powerful to curtail. Witchcraft is not viewed as only affecting African societies, but as a global phenomenon; ideologies and practices that contribute to development in Western societies such as individualism, privatisation, and land expropriation are often viewed as "forms and/or engines of witchcraft". Several scholars have argued that belief in witchcraft has had a negative effect on development, and practical-theologist Frederick Kakwata has advocated for pastors to consider the spiritual dimension of poverty among those affected. David Ngong, a scholar of African Christianity, has lamented what he views as anthropologists' and Christian preachers' legitimisation and normalisation of witchcraft beliefs, describing it as a worldview that "is not conducive to the economic development of the continent and its enhanced position in the modern world".

== History ==
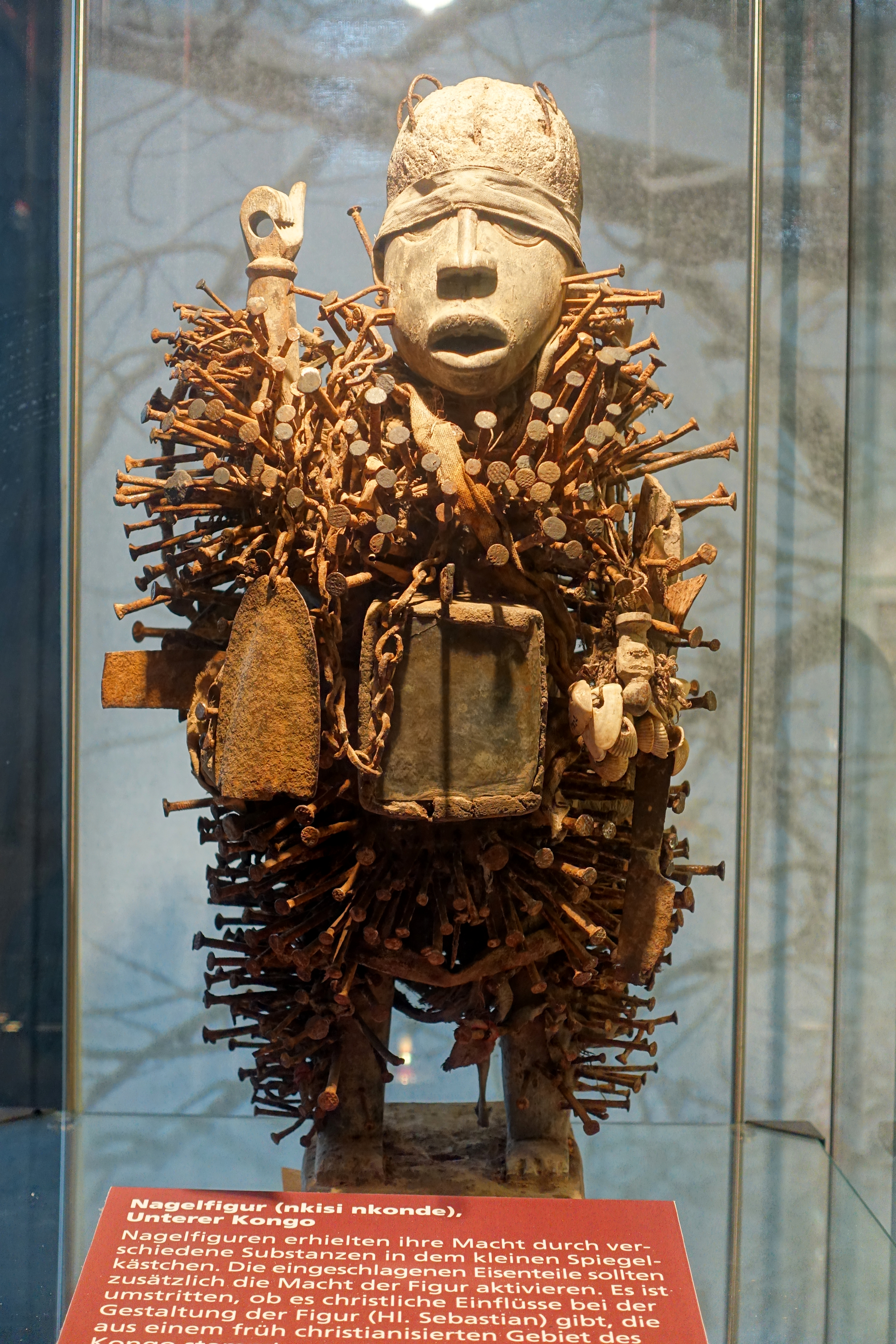
Power figure (nkisi nkondi) from Lower Congo is made to hunt witches

Pre-colonial Africa saw the existence of indigenous witchcraft practices, with some societies attributing supernatural powers to certain individuals. These beliefs ranged from beneficial powers like healing to malevolent forces capable of harm. The arrival of European colonial powers introduced significant changes. Informed by European witchcraft which was retrospectively viewed as irrational persecution of the disadvantaged (specifically women), colonial authorities viewed African witchcraft as "backward", "irrational", and "superstitious", and attempted to suppress or eradicate indigenous practices, leading to the criminalization and persecution of suspected witches. This colonial influence sparked a complex interplay between traditional beliefs and foreign religions like Christianity and Islam.

In the post-independence era some African countries continued to grapple with witchcraft-related issues, including accusations and violence. Witchcraft remains a significant aspect of many people's lives, with varying perceptions of its powers and dangers. Legal responses have emerged in some nations to protect individuals from harm and discrimination due to witchcraft accusations, but the practice and beliefs continue to evolve in the context of modernization and globalization.

== Influence on witchcraft in Latin America ==
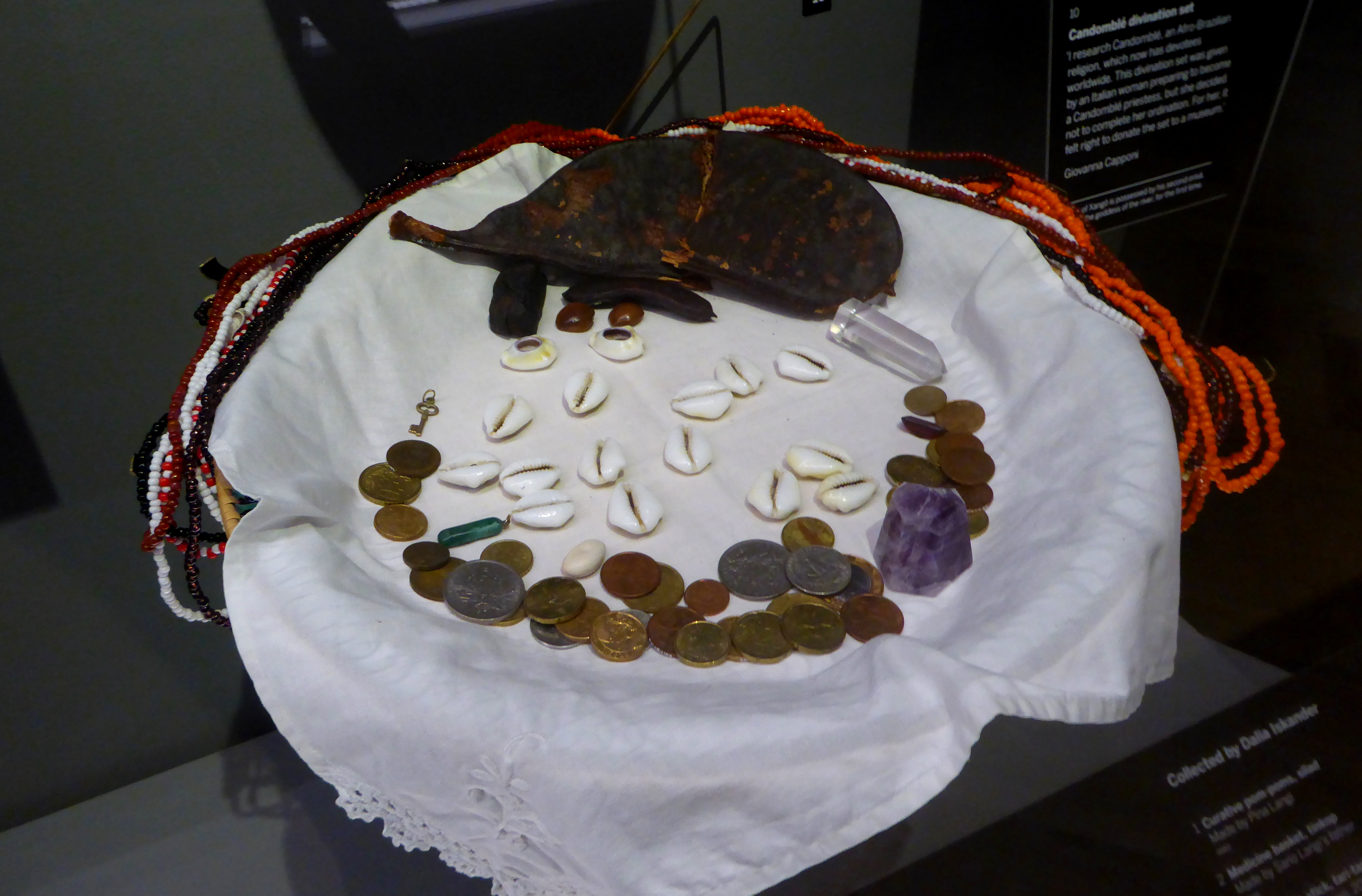
Candomblé Divination Set in the Horniman Museum

African witchcraft beliefs have exerted a profound influence on practices called brujeria in Latin America, especially in regions with incoming African diaspora religions, such as Brazil, Cuba, and the Caribbean. This influence is marked by syncretism, where African witchcraft beliefs have merged with Indigenous, European, and Christian elements. For instance, in Brazil's Candomblé and Cuba's Santería, African Orisha worship is blended with Catholicism, allowing practitioners to maintain their African spiritual heritage while adapting to the dominant religious culture.

== By region ==
=== Azande ===
Witchcraft plays a significant role in the beliefs and culture of the Azande people, located in North Central Africa, particularly in regions like South Sudan, the Central African Republic, and the Northern Democratic Republic of Congo. In Azande society, witchcraft is perceived as a potent force used to harm individuals, and it permeates every aspect of their lives. They believe that witchcraft is hereditary and can only be passed from parent to child of the same gender. This psychic power is believed to work at close range and can manipulate nature to cause harm, such as using animals or collapsing structures.

The Azande do not attribute human errors like mistakes in farming or moral crimes like lying to witchcraft. Instead, they primarily associate it with negative occurrences, such as disease and death. A witch will only use their powers against someone they dislike, with the process involving the transfer of the victim's soul to a group of witches. While the victim's relatives can prepare a defense, they must seek advice from an oracle before retaliating.

Oracles are crucial in Azande society for identifying those responsible for using witchcraft and predicting future tragedies. They employ various methods, such as the poison oracle (using a poisoned chicken), to determine if witchcraft is being used. The outcome of the oracle's decision influences the course of action taken by the community. Besides the poison oracle, there are also the termite oracle and the rubbing-board oracle, each with its level of reliability.

In addition to oracles, witch doctors are also consulted to predict disasters and identify witches. They undergo extensive training and perform rituals, often in front of a crowd of villagers, to locate the source of evil magic. Medicinal herbs play a crucial role in the power of witch doctors.

Early colonial observers often viewed Azande witchcraft as belonging to a primitive people, but anthropologist E. E. Evans-Pritchard's seminal work Witchcraft, Oracles, and Magic Among the Azande challenged this perception. He argued that Azande witchcraft is a coherent and logical system of ideas, similar to other world religions, contributing significantly to the field of anthropology by conducting extensive fieldwork and studying Azande beliefs and practices in-depth. Evans-Pritchard's work has had a lasting influence on the study of "primitive thought" and has guided subsequent generations of anthropologists in understanding the complexity of witchcraft in Azande culture.

=== Cameroon ===
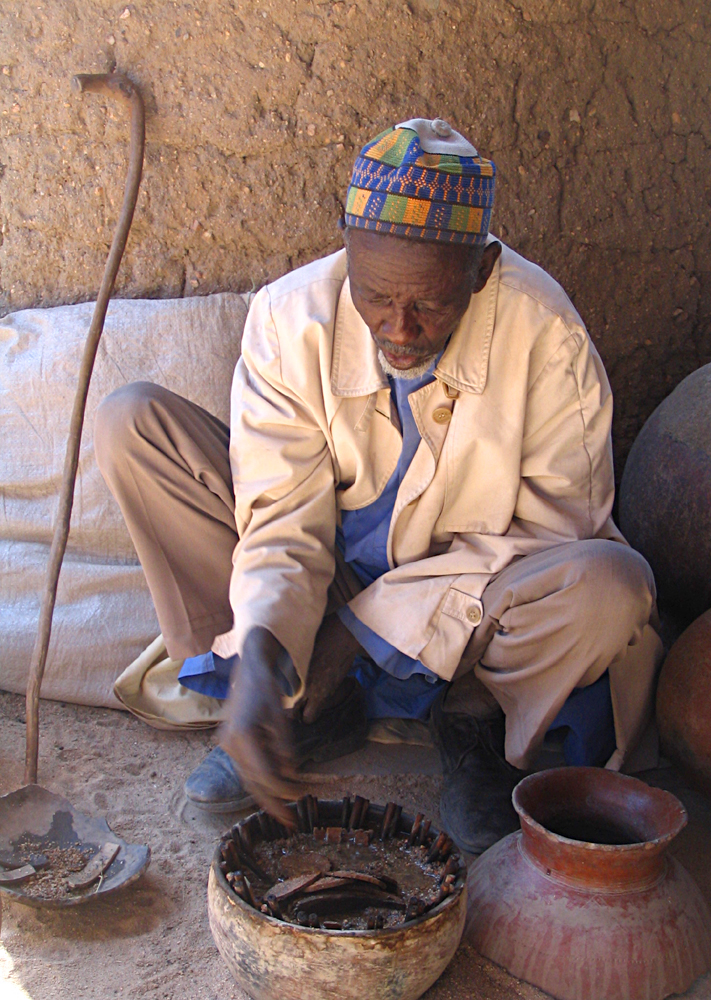
A Rhumsiki crab sorcerer in Cameroon

The Maka people of Cameroon believe in an occult force known as djambe, that dwells inside a person. It is often translated as "witchcraft" or "sorcery", but it has a broader meaning that encompasses supernatural harm, healing and shapeshifting; this highlights the problem of using European terms for African concepts.

=== Central African Republic ===
Every year hundreds of people in the Central African Republic are convicted of witchcraft. Christian militias in the Central African Republic have also kidnapped, burnt and buried alive women accused of being 'witches' in public ceremonies. Ngangas are spiritual healers in Central Africa and use divination to detect evil witches and perform rituals to remove witchcraft by making nkisi nkondi to hunt and punish sorcerers.

=== Democratic Republic of the Congo ===
As of 2006 between 25,000 and 50,000 children in Kinshasa, Democratic Republic of the Congo, had been accused of witchcraft and thrown out of their homes. These children have been subjected to often-violent abuse during exorcisms, sometimes supervised by self-styled religious pastors. Other pastors and Christian activists strongly oppose such accusations and try to rescue children from their unscrupulous colleagues. The usual term for these children is enfants sorciers ('child witches') or enfants dits sorciers ('children accused of witchcraft'). In 2002, USAID funded the production of two short films on the subject, made in Kinshasa by journalists Angela Nicoara and Mike Ormsby.

In April 2008 in Kinshasa, the police arrested 13 suspected sorcerers accused of using black magic or witchcraft to steal or shrink men's penises. Those accused of penis-snatching are often alleged to have done so to extort cash from their victim in exchange for a cure, sometimes amidst or resulting in a wave of panic.

According to one study the belief in magical warfare technologies (such as "bulletproofing") in the Eastern Democratic Republic of the Congo serves a group-level function, as it increases group efficiency in warfare, even if it is suboptimal at the individual level. The authors of the study argue that this is one reason why the belief in witchcraft persists.

Complimentary remarks about witchcraft by a native Congolese initiate:

From witchcraft [...] may be developed the remedy (kimbuki) that will do most to raise up our country. Witchcraft [...] deserves respect [...] it can embellish or redeem (ketula evo vuukisa)." The ancestors were equipped with the protective witchcraft of the clan (kindoki kiandundila kanda). [...] They could also gather the power of animals into their hands [...] whenever they needed. [...] If we could make use of these kinds of witchcraft, our country would rapidly progress in knowledge of every kind. You witches (zindoki) too, bring your science into the light to be written down so that [...] the benefits in it [...] endow our race.

=== Ghana ===
In Ghana women are often accused of witchcraft and attacked by neighbours. Because of this, there exist six witch camps in the country where women suspected of being witches can flee for safety. The witch camps, which exist solely in Ghana, are thought to house a total of around 1000 women. Some of the camps are thought to have been set up over 100 years ago. The Ghanaian government has announced that it intends to close the camps.

Arrests were made in an effort to avoid bloodshed seen in Ghana in 1997, when twelve alleged penis snatchers were beaten to death by mobs. While it is easy for modern people to dismiss such reports, Uchenna Okeja argues that a belief system in which such magical practices are deemed possible offer many benefits to Africans who hold them. For example, the belief that a sorcerer has "stolen" a man's penis functions as an anxiety-reduction mechanism for men suffering from impotence, while simultaneously providing an explanation that is consistent with African cultural beliefs rather than appealing to Western scientific notions that are, in the eyes of many Africans, tainted by the history of colonialism.

=== Kenya ===
In Kamba culture some people are believed to be born with spiritual powers to heal or harm. Historian Deika Mohamed says this about witchcraft in Africa: "The practice of witchcraft is often divided between uwe and uoi, the former softly translated as witchcraft for healing and the latter as witchcraft for harm. Uwe, uoi and kithitu (oath-taking) possess nuanced meanings. Beyond violence, uoi may refer to a way-of-being, a substance or force and uwe is often used to remedy the ill-effects of uoi. Similarly, kithitu may also denote the employed objects during the oathing ceremony or empowerment of the oath itself; those who disobey forfeit their life by means of curse. By exploring the lexicography of witchcraft the reader is made aware of the important complexity of an otherwise essentialized subject".

In 2008, Reuters reported that a mob in Kenya had burnt to death at least eleven people accused of witchcraft.

=== Malawi ===
In Malawi it is common practice to accuse children of witchcraft and many children have been abandoned, abused, and even killed as a result. As in other African countries, both a number of African traditional healers and some of their Christian counterparts are trying to make a living out of exorcising children and are actively involved in pointing out children as witches. Various secular and Christian organizations are combining their efforts to address this problem.

In May 2026, Habiba Osman, published her ideas concerning witchcraft and the law in Malawi. She noted that mobs were claiming "justice" to cover acts of murder against elder people who they accused of witchcraft. The 2024 "Older Persons Act" had not been enforced. She suggested that action including local courts could bring the perpetrators to justice and prevent their feeling of impunity. The law had seen some success in containing the irrational mistreatment of albino people and she argued that this could be extended to protect Malawi's elder people.

According to William Kamkwamba, witches and wizards are afraid of money, which they consider a rival evil. Any contact with cash will snap their spell and leave the wizard naked and confused, so placing cash, such as kwacha, around a room or bed mat will protect the resident from their malevolent spells.

=== Mozambique ===
==== Makonde people ====
The Makonde people of northern Mozambique, southern Tanzania, and southeastern Kenya maintain an active system of witchcraft and sorcery, sustained by people willing to pay for these services. Magic plays an influential role in local culture, politics and economics. Makonde sorcerers are often community leaders and are feared and respected as healers and protectors. They are frequently accused of murder and cannibalism, and are known to sometimes draw people away from seeking medical attention or contacting the police, when trust in healing and magic outweighs confidence in Western medicine or law enforcement.

Recently, Makonde sorcerers have been accused of trafficking in human organs or bones for use in the preparation of magical substances. As in many other countries, accusations of witchcraft in present-day Mozambique have led to vigilante justice in which suspected witches or sorcerers have been killed by angry mobs.

==== Ndau people ====
The Ndau people of central Mozambique are known to be very good herbalists, and they are openly described by Mozambicans to be the most feared black magicians. Ndau n'anga are traditional healers who also communicate with spirits and can heal or harm people using traditional medicine (mushonga). N'anga can be male or female, more often female, and all n'anga are believed to be capable of helping people or harming them. When asked to resolve a case of spirit aggression, the n'anga must first determine the nature of the spirit, and whether it was sent by a witch or another n'anga.

N'anga are often called upon by communities to manipulate the weather, particularly during droughts or floods, by appealing to the nzuzu. N'anga practice divination by inviting madzvoka to possess them, thus allowing the n'anga to perceive remote places and events. Using this technique, n'anga can determine the perpetrator of a crime, locate lost people or objects, and discover if a person is lying or telling the truth.

=== Nigeria ===
In Nigeria several Pentecostal pastors have mixed their evangelical brand of Christianity with African beliefs in witchcraft to benefit from the lucrative witch-finding and exorcism business—which in the past was the exclusive domain of the so-called witch doctor or traditional healers. These pastors have been involved in the torturing and even killing of children accused of witchcraft. In the states of Akwa Ibom and Cross River alone, around 15,000 children have been accused, with around 1,000 murdered between 2000 and 2010.

Churches are very numerous in Nigeria, and competition for congregations is hard. Some pastors attempt to establish a reputation for spiritual power by "detecting" child witches, usually following a death or loss of a job within a family, or an accusation of financial fraud against the pastor. In the course of "exorcisms", accused children may be starved, beaten, mutilated, set on fire, forced to consume acid or cement, or buried alive. While some church leaders and Christian activists have spoken out strongly against these abuses, many Nigerian churches are involved in the abuse, although church administrations deny knowledge of it.

In May 2020 fifteen adults, mostly women, were set ablaze after being accused of witchcraft, including the mother of the instigator of the attack, Thomas Obi Tawo, a local politician.

=== Republic of the Congo ===
In precolonial Tio society, evil was believed to be caused by spirits called apfu, and illness and death caused by witchcraft which was undertaken by disguised witches (ngeiloolo). They were thought to exploit friction between kin in order to frame one party. Powerful figures were associated with witchcraft, and the king was believed to have killed 12 people with it to come to rule, being seen as the "epitome of witchcraft". Concerns surrounded members bewitching one another, which often started feuds, the threat of which fostered functionality of the unit. Accusations of witchcraft were adjudicated by poison trials (nkei).

=== Sierra Leone ===
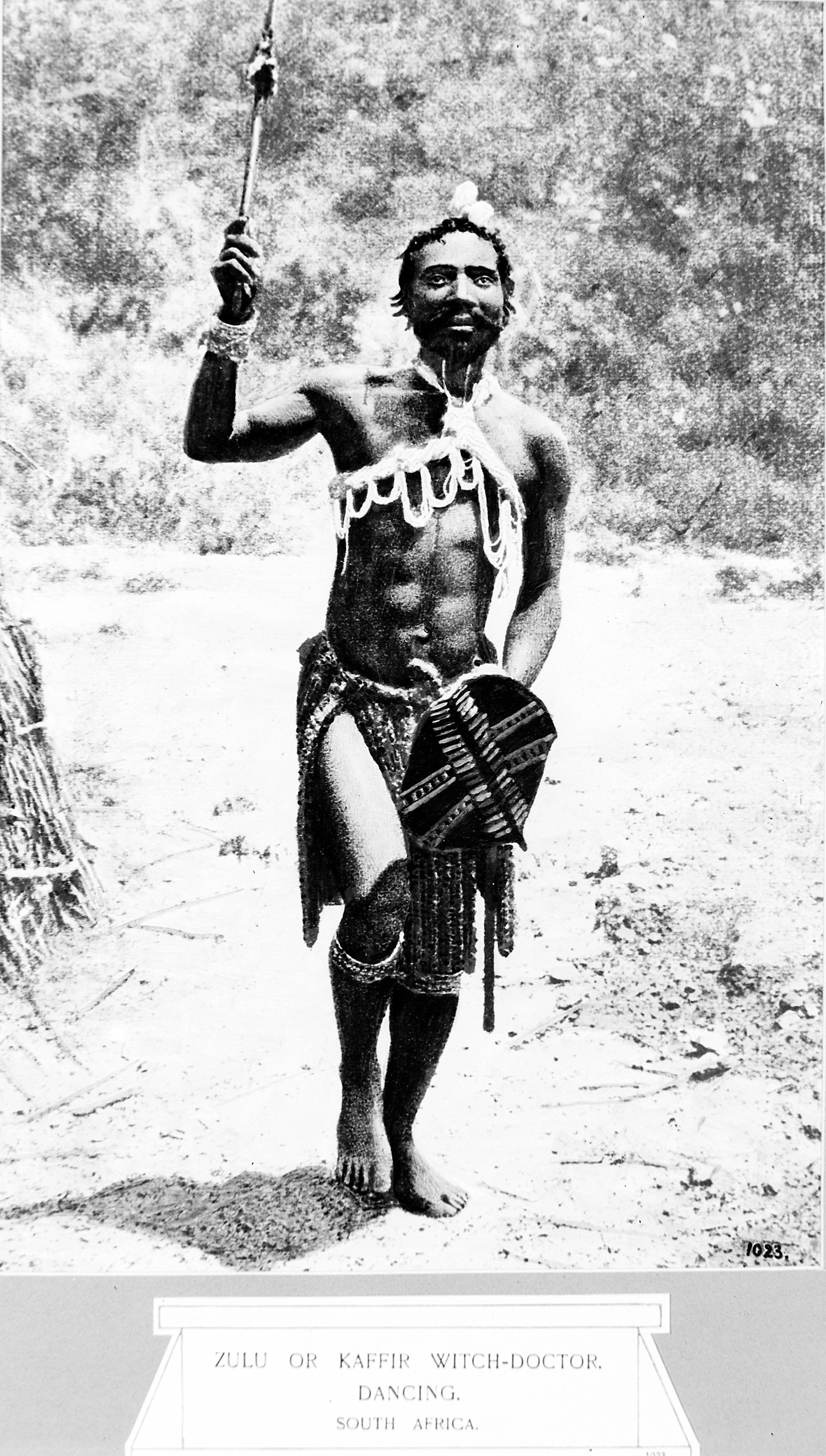
A Zulu healer dancing to remove pleurisy, South Africa, early 20th century

Among the Mende of Sierra Leone, trial and conviction for witchcraft has a beneficial effect for those convicted. "The witchfinder had warned the whole village to ensure the relative prosperity of the accused and sentenced ... old people. ... Six months later all of the people ... accused, were secure, well-fed and arguably happier than at any [previous] time; they had hardly to beckon and people would come with food or whatever was needful. ... Instead of such old and widowed people being left helpless or (as in Western society) institutionalized in old people's homes, these were reintegrated into society and left secure in their old age ... Old people are 'suitable' candidates for this kind of accusation in the sense that they are isolated and vulnerable, and they are 'suitable' candidates for 'social security' for precisely the same reasons." In Kuranko language, the term for witchcraft is suwa'ye referring to 'extraordinary powers'.

=== Zulu ===
In Zulu culture, herbal and spiritual healers called sangomas protect people from evil spirits and witchcraft. They perform divination and healing with ancestral spirits and usually train with elders for about five to seven years. In the cities, however, some offer trainings that take only several months, but there is concern about inadequately-trained and fraudulent "sangomas" exploiting and harming people who may come to them for help.

Another type of healer is the inyanga, who heals people with plant and animal parts. This is a profession that is hereditary, and passed down through family lines. While there used to be more of a distinction between the two types of healers, in contemporary practice, the terms are often used interchangeably.

== See also ==
- African traditional medicine
- Bokor – Vodou priest or priestess
- Neopaganism in South Africa
