= Witchcraft in Latin America =

Witchcraft, also known as brujería in Spanish or bruxaria in Portuguese, in Latin America is a syncretic tradition that combines Indigenous, African and Catholic spiritual and folk practices. Variations of brujería are practiced in different Latin American countries with accusations of witchcraft historically intertwined with social dynamics and colonization. Practitioners are called brujas or bruxas (feminine) and brujos ou bruxos (masculine sometimes even gender neutral).

== Description and analysis ==
In Latin America, witchcraft practices and beliefs vary from country to country, with some practices having roots to African witchcraft due to the Atlantic Slave Trade. Most agreed upon terminology for witchcraft is the notion of certain individuals using spiritual powers or abilities to purposefully harm others. While this can be seen in Latin American witchcraft, mostly by the Catholic Church, the practice and beliefs of brujas and brujos in various countries tend to focus on divination, counter spells and healing magic.

Anthropologist do not often discuss disciplinary debates on witchcraft in a scholarly setting due to controversy from the Catholic Church, but instead approach the subject through a Mesoamerican perspective, focusing on the cultural meaning and historical significance of indigenous people. In countries such as Mexico, this perspective also analyzes Latin American witchcraft through the lense of indigenous cosmologies, traditional medicine and devotional worship to a combination of Catholic saints, folk heroes such as Jesus Malverde and post colonial deities such as Santa Muerte. This blend of traditions has been theorized to be a trans cultural process of adapting, modifying and incorporating various elements of African and Catholic traditions that was able to conform to indigenous practices.

While brujeria inherited traits from Catholicism, the Catholic Church had deemed the practice as spiritually dangerous. As a result, persecution of practitioners often included people who worked in various jobs such as midwives and healers. Persecution was common during the 16th and 17th centuries often through accusation by one person against another, with an increase in self accusations by practitioners in the late 1700s in order to avoid sentences greater than an economic sanction. Often these cases resulted in the acquisition of personal goods, exile, increase in religious worship and practice and fasting.Its extremely rare for those convicted of brujeria to be executed with only a few cases in Mexico, Peru and Guatemala.

Since the 1970s, with the rise of the New Age religion, there has been an increase interest in indigenous and folk magic, commonly among young Latin American women who look to connect with their ancestral roots.

== By region ==
Across the Afro-Latin diaspora, many forms of spiritual practices have emerged: Cuban Santería, and Brazilian Candomblé and Umbanda. What sets the "witches" of Latin America apart from their European counterparts is the blend of religiosity and spirituality. Latin American "witches" are rooted in African magic, European spiritualism, and Indigenous practices, making them practice an integrated version of spirituality.

=== Brazil ===
In Brazil, witchcraft traditions blend African religions like Candomblé and Umbanda with Indigenous and European practices. Bruxos often invoke Orixas, or spirits of nature, in healing ceremonies and magic work. Brazilian Candomblé Umbanda

=== Colombia ===
In the 16th to 18th centuries, witchcraft accusations in New Spain and other parts of colonial Latin America were tied to the Spanish Inquisition. Trials often focused on acts of blasphemy against sacred images, such as spitting, trampling, or insulting crucifixes and paintings of the Virgin Mary. These actions were not always expressions of nonbelief but sometimes reflected frustration, gambling losses, or conflicted devotion. For instance, the Criollo soldier Juan de Solís was denounced in 1640 for violating candles and a crucifix after losing at a game of cards. The nun Sor Margarita de San José confessed to spitting on and damaging items in Mexico City in 1717.

=== Cuba ===
In the late 1800s to early 1900s during the early days of American occupation within Cuba, there were established attacks to undermine the legitimacy of several Afro-Cuban institutions and organizations— including brujería.

With the growth of a single Cuban identity came a greater appreciation for conformity and deviation from “creolised manifestations”. However, the declination of faith-based practices in Cuba due to the rise in Marxism from 1959 to the 1990s lead to practitioners of Afro-Cuban religions to have to find innovative ways to survive Castro’s political informants that particularly called for the suppression of witchcraft and brujería.

The introduction of Spiritism in the twentieth century attracted more participants of all racial backgrounds. It also added new foundations of practice and ritualistic objects such as: santiguos (healing blessings), 19 despojos (spiritual cleansings), prayers, and spells; and an array of Indigenous, medieval Catholic, and African offerings.

Brujería does not participate in community, hierarchical, or initiation-based practice or membership. Rituals are interdependent on the procedures, practices, and attitudes passed down by its participants and heavily depend on forces of nature and the spontaneity of the spirits. Following specific guidelines and doctrines in brujería is possible.

However, some commonalities include basic ritual gestures, communication during divination, possession, and specific components of altars. These similarities are often referred to as a "kind of spiritual lingua franca" which explains the ubiquity of the practice cross the Afro-Latino and Non-Afro-Latino diaspora.

In practice, brujos and brujas stress to not believe in the ritualistic objects or hold too much pertinence in the material representations of the spiritual entities, but rather focus on the messages and "powers of the entities that inhabit these icons" that are also used to summon ancient beings like deities, saints, spirits and other supernatural beings.

Power is sensed and manifested when the voices of Spiritist entities, Santería orishas, and the recently deceased are brought on by "brujería rituals, divination, trance and the making of magic works". The spirits' abstract means of revelation include through emotions, through senses, and through healings as a means to transform the "emotional, proprioceptive and (to some extent) physiological states of participants".

Whereas a lot of focus within the practice of brujería is on the technological systems, brujería focuses mostly on interpersonal client-patient power that "emerges during healing, divination and magic rituals challenges the assumed precondition"; specifically in regards to health, labor, family relations, and even career management.

Brujos and practitioners of brujería never question the spirits. The performative methods of surrender training is the only lesson brujos aim to teach. The expectation is to have faith in the spirits and the spirits will theatrically reveal what is meant to be shown.

Cuban Santería

=== Mexico ===
Witchcraft in Mexico comprises various traditions, rituals, and beliefs. Among the many rituals and beliefs rooted in Mexican folklore are limpia and mal de ojo. Limpia or barrida is a cleansing ritual practiced in brujería and curanderismo. The word limpia translates to "clean", and barrida means "sweep"; the practice is intended to cleanse someone. The ritual involves the patient, either sitting or standing, being swept from head to toe with a broom typically made with herbs. The purpose of the ritual is to remove negative energy and bring on spiritual strength. While there are various ways to perform the act, the ritual can also include the use of a lemon or egg as a means to sweep away the negative energy.

==== Mal de ojo ====
Mal de ojo, often called mal ojo or ojo, translates to "evil eye". The belief is that someone can cause another person or object to become ill or damaged by staring with envy or malice. However, since it is believed that it can be done intentionally and unintentionally, staring in admiration may also cause harm. To prevent or combat this, the person who was staring may touch the affected person or item. The symptoms associated with mal de ojo are vomiting, headaches, and fever, to name a few.

A folk remedy similar to limpia called barrer con un blanquillo” or sweep with an egg is performed to treat illness or ailments caused by mal de ojo. Variations of the ritual differ; however, there are two main components. The first is an egg to be used in a sweeping motion away from the person while the person performing the ritual recites a prayer or chant. The second is to crack the egg into a glass, jar, or bowl of water. However, what is done after the egg varies as well as what is recited during the ritual.

=== Peru ===
In the Andean regions of Peru, particularly around Cusco, spiritual practices revolve around the veneration of Pachamama (Mother Earth) and Apus (Mountain Spirits). Ritual offerings called despachos are a central aspect of these practices, where individuals offer items such as coca leaves, food, and alcohol to these deities in exchange for protection, good fortune, or healing. These rituals demonstrate the deep connection between the spiritual world and nature in the Indigenous beliefs.

Indigenous and Afro-Latin traditions also shaped colonial witchcraft practices. In Peru, healers like Juana Icha were accused of making pacts with protective deities to defend their communities against colonial abuses. In Cartagena, African-descended women were important practitioners of love magic and healing rituals, sometimes taught by clergymen themselves. Objects such as herbs, altar stones, eggs, and chocolate were used in spells, which reflected syncretic blends of Indigenous medical knowledge and African ritual practices. Colonial authorities often saw these practices as "demonic", yet communities relied on them for protection, healing, and negotiation of everyday life.

As separatist ideals begin to gain more momentum, particularly in Puerto Rico, there becomes more clings to cultural nationalism— including clings to aspects of Afro-Boricua and Taíno folklore. Previously (1950s–1960s), journalists in the island denounced brujería as a way to help “educate the masses”. However, the shift in cultural nationalism from the 1980s onwards now leads to media outlets uncovering “hidden traditions” of the “endangered Puerto Rican Hispanic, Taíno, and African traditions”

=== Puerto Rico ===
In Latin America, in the 1500s, when the archbishop of Santo Domingo and fifth bishop of Puerto Rico, Nicolás Ramos, recorded his recollections of ‘black brujos [male and female] who engaged with the Devil in the shape of a goat and, every night in front of this goat, cursed God, Santa María, and the sacraments of the Holy Church.’’ Ramos wrote, ‘‘[A]sserting that they did not have nor believe in a god other than that devil...they performed these rituals in some fields [apparently they were in a trance] ,...not in dreams since there were some people who saw them.’’ These people, Ramos continues, ‘‘tried to make them [the sorcerers] refrain from their doings through chanting and holy gifts [dádivas], and with all this [information they] came to me.” This perpetual demonization of elements of African worship set up the forefront to the centuries of demonization of brujería practices.

From the sixteenth to the subsequent eighteenth and nineteenth centuries, slaves were shipped from Africa to Puerto Rico and Hispaniola and were forced to convert to Christianity by the imposing church and the overseeing hacendados—land owners. Branded slaves were baptized to be fully recognized as the property of hacendados.

=== Caribbean ===
Unlike many other Caribbean religions that derive from Africa, brujería is not based on a stable community, hierarchy, or membership. Instead, practices are more dependent on the ritual preferences of the actual participants. Because of the spontaneity of the spirits, it is impossible for institutionalized doctrines of worship to be enforced on followers and practices of brujería.

Within sacred altars of brujos, lessons of practitioners, and brujería rituals lie ties to African ideologies, Catholicism, and Spiritism; explaining the erasure of hierarchical order.

Before Spiritism was developed, Taíno people and enslaved African people in Latin America developed the convictions that there exist spirits and those spirits can be communicated with. This becomes mixed with the convictions of spiritual worship introduced by Catholic missionaries. Early leaders of Spiritism found interest in brujería amongst liberal, emancipation minded groups in the late nineteenth century; begging the interest for further research of the correlation between politics and brujería.

== See also ==
- Candomblé Jejé – Branch of Candomblé
- Catalan myths and legends
- Carlos Castaneda – American anthropologist and writer (1925–1998)
- Curandero – Traditional healer in Latin America and the United States
- Dominican Vudú – Religion from the Dominican Republic
- Guayama, Puerto Rico – City and municipality of Puerto Rico
- Haitian Vodou in Cuba – Religion indigenous to Cuba
- Nagual – Shapeshifting sorcerer in Mesoamerican folk religion
- Tambor de Mina – Afro-Brazilian religious tradition
- Warlocks of Chiloé – Beings in Chilote mythology
