= Azande witchcraft =

Witchcraft in North Central Africa

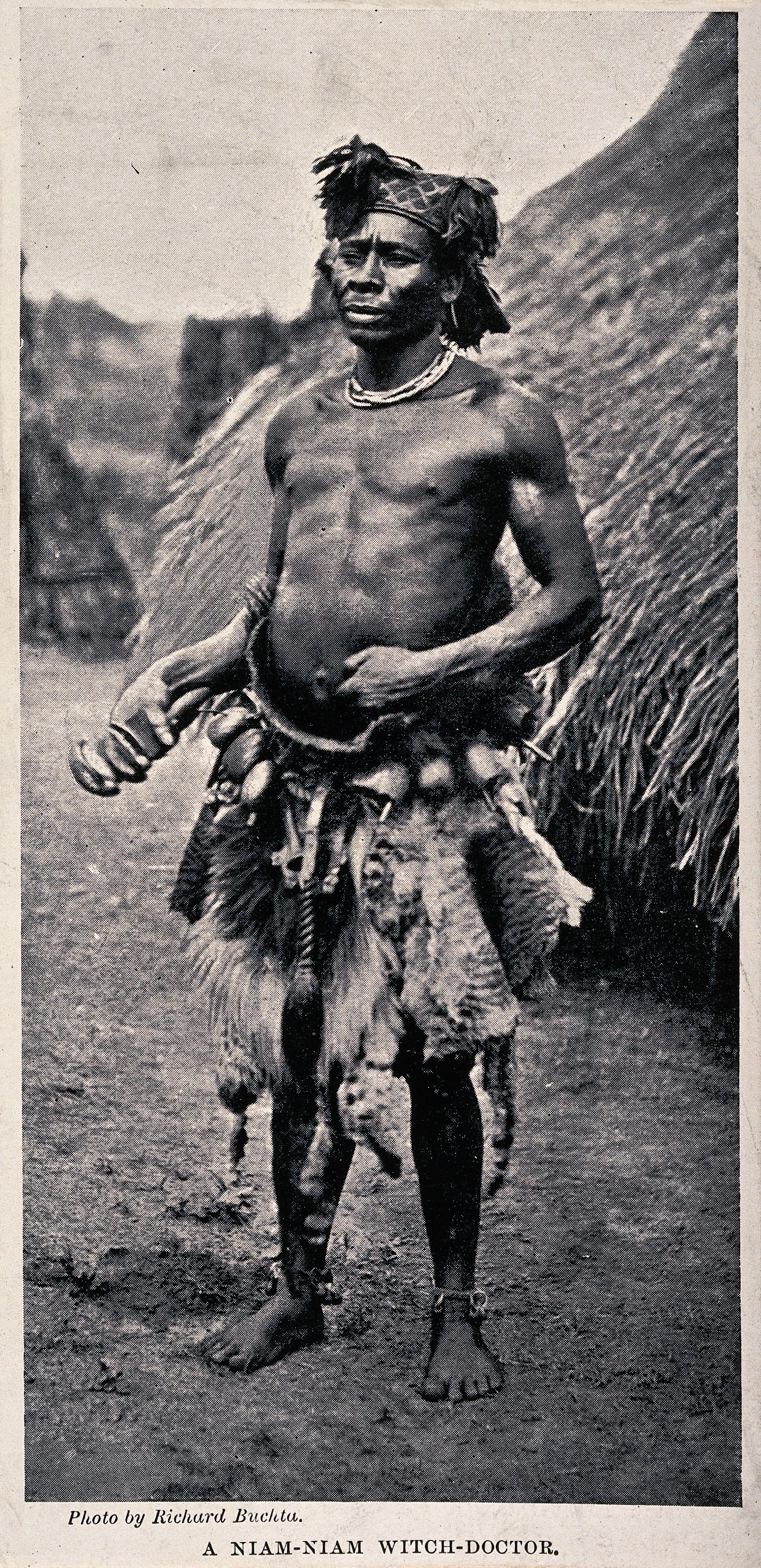
Azande witch doctor

Witchcraft among the Zande people of North Central Africa is magic used to inflict harm on an individual that is native to the Azande tribal peoples. The belief in witchcraft is present in every aspect of Zande society. They believe it is a power that can only be passed on from a parent to their child. To the Azande, a witch uses witchcraft when he has hatred towards another person. Witchcraft can also manipulate nature to bring harm upon the victim of the witch. Oracles and witch doctors determine whether someone is guilty of using witchcraft on another villager. More magic is then created to avenge the victim and punish the one who committed the transgression.

== Description ==
The African tribe of the Azande are largely found in the African countries of South Sudan, the Central African Republic, and the Northern Democratic Republic of Congo. Witchcraft surrounds Zande culture and is believed to be the major cause of disease, death, and any other unfortunate events that occur. It clings to a digestive organ of the body, and the only way it can be inherited is if the offspring of the witch is of the same sex. If a witch is male, then his child must be male in order to inherit witchcraft; likewise, if a witch is female, then her child must be female for witchcraft to be passed on to her child. Witchcraft is a psychic power that can only be used at a short range. Because of this, the Azande tend to distance themselves from their neighbors and live closer to oracles. Witchcraft can also use nature to cause injury or even death if the witch allows it. It can manipulate an animal such as a buffalo to kill someone or cause a structure such as a storage house to collapse on top of someone.

Although they believe that witchcraft is the cause of most negative occurrences, the Azande do not blame it for human errors. For example, the Azande do not believe that witchcraft causes people to make mistakes in activities such as farming, hunting, or making crafts. Witchcraft also does not influence anyone to commit moral crimes such as lying, cheating, or deceiving someone. Evans-Pritchard's example of the collapsing granary is cited by other scholars as illustrative: "If a person is killed by the collapse of the granary, the Azande call it witchcraft. This does not mean they deny that the poles on which the granary rested were destroyed by termites. And the Azande know very well that many persons rest under a granary to avoid the heat in summer. However, that the granary collapsed in exactly the moment in which this specific human being sat under it, and not a moment before or after, is supposed to be the result of witchcraft."

A witch will not use his or her powers to hurt someone unless they dislike that person. When a witch uses their witchcraft on a victim, it is said to flow out of them and into the body of the sleeping victim to steal their soul; a group of witches will then eat the soul of the victim, working collaboratively. Killing a person is a slow process, for the witch may have to perform witchcraft several times on the person to actually accomplish it. In turn, while the witch is performing their witchcraft, the victim's relatives can prepare a plan of defense and strike back at the evil magic, but before they are allowed to do this, they must seek advice from an oracle.

Azande witches do not use magical spells or use any medicines. Witches perform their witchcraft through physical acts. Witches are very different than sorcerers who use who can make people ill by performing magic through the use of bad medicines.

== Role of oracles ==
Oracles are tasked with finding those responsible for using witchcraft on an individual, and with predicting future tragedies. If someone believes witchcraft is being used to cause misfortune upon one of their relatives, they may seek the wisdom of the oracles to see if that is the case. Different methods are used by oracles to determine whether someone is using witchcraft to bring disaster upon an individual.

The Azande consult the oracles about many different types of things that they need information on. In pre-European times the Zande chiefs consulted the oracles about different types of military decisions that they needed to make. The Azande use three different types of oracles. The most powerful oracle is the "benge" poison oracle, which is used solely by men. The decisions of the oracle are always accepted and no one questions them. This ritual that goes along with the use of the oracle utilizes a chicken and that is administered a special poison and then asked questions to. The answer to the question lies in the fate of the chicken whether it dies or lives after it is administered the poison for a set amount of time.

One such method to find out if witchcraft is being used is the so-called poison oracle; this uses a vegetable poison called benge, which is fed to a chicken. Whether the bird survives determines the answer. There are specific situations where a second fowl is fed the same poison to confirm the results of the first test. In order for the first test to be accepted as solid evidence, the results of the second test must be opposite of the first.

An example of an instance that the "benge" oracle may be used in is can be seen in the ethnographic video Witchcraft Among the Azande by anthropologist John Ryle. In order to find out why his wife is sick a husband consults the "benge" oracle to find the witch who is the one that is making his wife sick. He asks this question to the benge oracle and then feed the poison to the chicken if it dies then the witch he asked the question about is guilty. The chicken in this case died and he then asked another chicken if he should divorce the second wife since she is the one causing the illness. But the oracle decides that would be pointless and that the other wife must spit water sincerely in order to purify herself so that the first wife gets well again.

The "benge" oracle can also be used in adultery cases to help decide if the people on trial are guilty. This can be seen in the ethnographic video Witchcraft Among the Azande when they have a case of adultery in the village. The adultery case has to go before the "benge" oracle to see if the women should get to live or die and if she is guilty or telling the truth. The chief has to consult the "benge" oracle and the chicken should only die if the two undressed and had sex and the chicken died proving that adultery had taken place. This will then be taken to the court and shown to the judge to prove that the two had lied and were actually a part of adultery.

Another group of oracles that the Zande can seek is the termite oracle. The termite oracle is more readily available to all. Women, men, and children are all allowed to consult this oracle. When a question is presented before these oracles, they take a branch from two trees. One branch is called the dakpa, another kpoyo. The oracle takes these branches and sticks them into a termite mound and waits overnight to see which branch the termites eat, which dictates the answer. The termite oracle is not as popular as the poison oracle, because it is more time-consuming. This is less elaborate and costly than the benge oracle. An example of an instance in which the termite oracle can be used in the ethnographic video Witchcraft Among the Azande when a woman in the village is sick and her husband wants to know whether or not she is going to live or die.

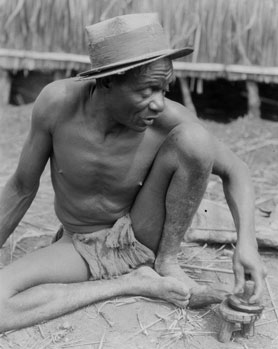
Zande man with rubbing board oracle

The least expensive but also least reliable oracle is the rubbing-board oracle. The rubbing board oracle is described in Culture Sketches as "a device resembling a Ouija board, made of two small pieces of wood easily carried to be consulted anywhere, and at any time." They have a wood handle and second piece of wood if the wood catches or sticks then the answer to the question is revealed.

== Witch doctors ==
In addition to the oracles, witch doctors can also predict disasters and reveal the witches who use their witchcraft to cause harm. Although both oracles and witch doctors have these abilities, witchdoctors are considered to be more accurate as far as pointing out witches. Witch doctors must go through extensive training; when their assistance is needed, they come together and perform a dance near the home of one who is sick or dead to locate the origin of the evil magic. Normally a crowd of villagers are surrounding them during their dance, so the witchdoctors strive to perform their dance perfectly in order to impress those who are watching. The power that allows witch doctors to track down witches comes from medicinal herbs.

== Historiography ==
Earlier (colonial) observers on Azande witchcraft frequently cast the practice as belonging to a primitive people. Anthropologist E. E. Evans-Pritchard (who acknowledged the importance of the work done by Claude Lévi-Strauss) argued that the pervasive belief in witchcraft was a belief system not essentially different from other world religions; Azande witchcraft is a coherent and logical system of ideas.

Evans-Pritchard's Witchcraft, Oracles, and Magic among the Azande (1937) is a standard reference work on Azande witchcraft. It has been subjected to a number of reviews, and is seen as a "turning point in the evaluation of 'primitive thought'". Unlike his predecessors who published on magic, he actually did field work, studying in what was then Anglo-Egyptian Sudan for many years. A critical assessment of his book from 2017 concluded that his "efforts to clarify meaning in this way [seeing magic as a logically consistent system of thought] have proved hugely influential, and have played a major part in guiding later generations of anthropologists".
