= Witchcraft, Oracles and Magic Among the Azande =

1937 book by E. E. Evans-Pritchard

- Title page for Witchcraft, Oracles and Magic Among the Azande (1937)
- Author: E. E. Evans-Pritchard
- Language: English
- Subject: Ethnography
- Publisher: Oxford: The Clarendon Press
- Publication date: 1937
- Media type: Print

Witchcraft, Oracles and Magic Among the Azande is one of social anthropology's most noted texts. In this work E. E. Evans-Pritchard examines the witchcraft beliefs of the Azande, a group of agricultural people in southern Sudan on the upper Nile. There are two main points he makes in the work. One is that witchcraft can be seen as a safety valve, that releases potential harmful conflict into less damaging activities. The other is that it can be seen as an attempt to explain a complex alien world in a society's own terms of reference. Together these make for a practical solution that is consistent and rational.

Eriksen and Nielsen (2013) argue that the remarkable thing about Evans-Pritchard is the way the two approaches are combined into a single approach. In this approach the Zande are seen to have developed a belief systems that both acts stabilise and harmonise the order of society, but also is both rational and logically consistent. A logical consistency based on the presuppositions of the Azande's thought. Eriksen and Nielsen also report the criticism of other scholars of Evans-Pritchard's monograph. They record Peter Winch (1958) as making a big deal out of Evans-Pritchard's structural-functionalist approach where in he is reported as arguing that the Azande's belief in witchcraft is reduced to its ‘social functions’.

The work was a development of his earlier (1928). Oracle-magic of the Azande. Sudan Notes and Records, 11, 1-53..

== The book ==
Evans-Pritchard, E.E. (1937). Witchcraft, Oracles, and Magic Among the Azande. Oxford: The Clarendon Press

=== Contents ===
I. Witchcraft is an organic and hereditary phenomenon
II. The notion of witchcraft explains unfortunate events
III. Sufferers from misfortune seek for witches among their enemies
IV. Are witches conscious agents?
V. Witch-doctors
VI. Training of a novice in the art of a witch-doctor
VII. The place of witch-doctors in Zande society
VIII. The Poison Oracle in daily life
IX. Problems arising from consultation of the poison oracle
X. Other Zande oracles
XI. Magic and medicines
XII. An association for the practice of magic
XIII. Witchcraft, oracles, and magic, in the situation of death
