= Siege of Syracuse (343 BC) =

Siege during wars between Sicily and Carthage

- Part of The Sicilian Wars
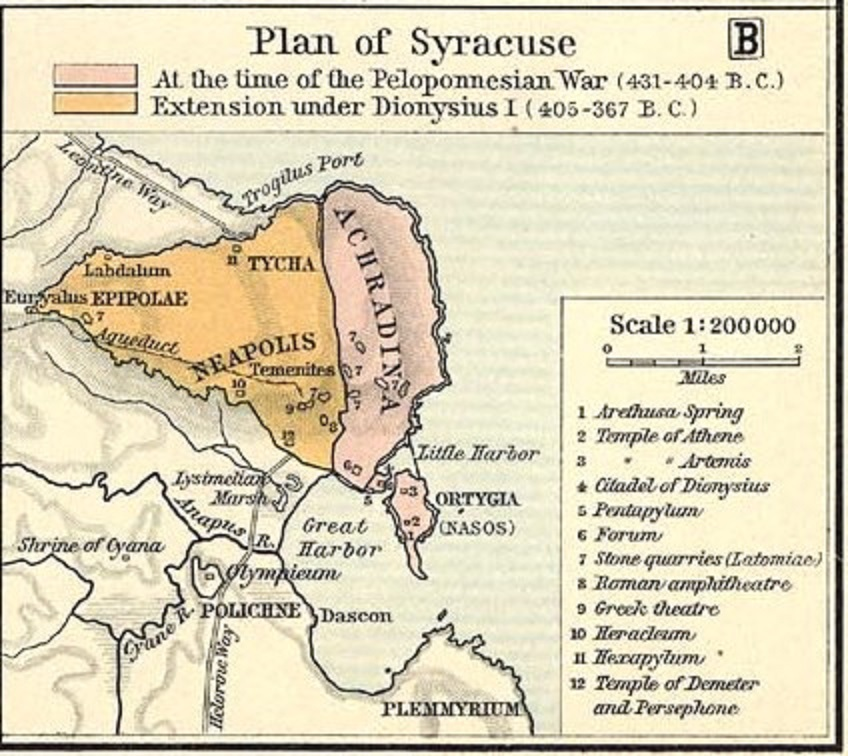
Date	344–343/342 BC
Location	Syracuse, Sicily, Italy
Result	Corinthian victory; democracy restored to Syracuse

Belligerents
Leontini; Carthage	Syracuse	Corinth; Tauromenium; Adranum; Tyndaris; Catana

Commanders and leaders
Mago III ‡‡ Hicetas; Mago	Dionysius II	Timoleon

Strength
Carthaginians: 60,000 infantry 150 ships	2,000	6,400

The siege of Syracuse from 344 to 343/342 BC was part of a war between the Syracusan general Hicetas and the tyrant of Syracuse, Dionysius II. The conflict became more complex when Carthage and Corinth became involved. The Carthaginians had made an alliance with Hicetas to expand their power in Sicily. Somewhat later, the Corinthian general Timoleon arrived in Sicily to restore democracy to Syracuse. With the assistance of several other Sicilian Greek cities, Timoleon emerged victorious and reinstated a democratic regime in Syracuse. The siege is described by the ancient historians Diodorus Siculus and Plutarch, but there are important differences in their accounts.

== Involvement of Carthage and Corinth ==
Some of the Syracusans who suffered under the rule of Dionysius sought refuge with Hicetas, the tyrant of Leontini. Because he was a Syracusan by birth and possessed an army which rivalled that of Dionysius, they chose him as their leader in the war against Dionysius. Carthage, which possessed territory on the western half of Sicily, saw an opportunity to take advantage of the chaos. When Carthage sent a large army to the island, the Syracusan faction with Hicetas decided to ask Corinth for help. Corinth was their mother city, which had founded Syracuse in 735 BC and opposed tyrants.

Hicetas however did not plan on restoring democracy to Syracuse, but wanted to become tyrant himself. He had already communicated with the Carthaginians in secret, but supported the plan to request aid from Corinth. He expected that Corinth would refuse the request because they would be occupied by their own affairs. With a refusal from Corinth, he thought it would be easier to convince the Syracusans that an alliance with Carthage was needed. The Corinthians elected Timoleon as general to lead an expedition to Sicily. As soon as the embassy to Corinth had been sent, Hicetas allied himself openly with the Carthaginians. On grounds that the expedition would take too long to arrive he sent a letter to Corinth telling them to abandon the expedition. The Corinthians were angered by this treachery, so Timoleon had no problems with recruiting a sufficient force for his expedition.

In 344 BC Timoleon departed from Corinth to Syracuse. According to Diodorus he had 700 mercenaries on seven ships. En route his expedition was joined by three more ships from Leucadia and Corcyra. Plutarch mentions seven Corinthian ships, two from Corcyra and one from Leucadia, totalling 1,000 soldiers. During the journey Timoleon witnessed a celestial phenomenon during the night when he crossed the Ionian Sea to Italy. This has been interpreted as a sighting of the Lyrids, a meteor shower. If true, he would have completed his crossing on 21 March of 344 BC.

== Hicetas captures Syracuse partially ==
In the meantime Hicetas besieged Syracuse, which was still under the control of Dionysus. He constructed a stockaded camp at the Olympiaeum, but had to lift the siege when he had a shortage of supplies. While he retreated to Leontini with his army, Dionysius pursued and attacked him in the rear. Despite the surprise attack, Hicetas managed to prevail over Dionysius. The army of Dionysus fled after 3,000 of his mercenaries were slain. Hicetas then pursued Dionysius in turn and quickly captured the part of Syracuse on the Sicilian mainland, while Dionysius managed to hold out on the island Ortygia.

== Arrival of Timoleon ==
According to Diodorus, Timoleon arrived at Rhegium three days after Hicetas captured Syracuse partially. Hicetas wanted to prevent him from landing on Sicily, so he sent twenty Carthaginian triremes to Rhegium with envoys of Hicetas. The envoys told Timoleon that the war was almost over and demanded that he sent his fleet back to Corinth. If he wished, Timoleon himself could join Hicetas as his advisor and ally. To deceive the envoys, Timoleon told them he would abide by their wishes on condition that the people of Rhegium were witness to their agreement during an assembly. While the Carthaginians were occupied with the assembly, Timoleon secretly boarded his ships and crossed over to Tauromenium in Sicily. The ruler of the city, Andromachus, supported Timoleon and persuaded his citizens to join the Corinthians.

== Timoleon captures Syracuse entirely ==
At this point the accounts of Diodorus Siculus and Plutarch begin to diverge significantly. The most important differences are the circumstances of the surrender of Dionysius to Timoleon.

=== Account of Diodorus Siculus ===
While maintaining the siege of Ortygia, Hicetas marched against Adranum, which was hostile to him. With 5,000 troops he encamped near their city. Timoleon, reinforced with some soldiers from Tauromenium, marched out of that city towards Adranum as well. In total he had no more than 1,000 men. When he arrived at Adranum he made a surprise attack on Hicetas's men while they were at dinner. His army killed more than 300 men, took about 600 prisoners and captured the camp of Hicetas. He then dashed to Syracuse and attacked the city by surprise, capturing a part of the city. However, Hicetas was not decisively defeated and managed to maintain a foothold in Syracuse. By now, in 344/343 BC, the situation in Syracuse had become even more complex as the city was divided between the three belligerents. Dionysius continued to hold Ortygia, Hicetas held the Achradina and Neapolis neighbourhoods on the mainland and Timoleon held the rest of the city. As the allies of Hicetas, the Carthaginians occupied the Great Harbour with 150 triremes and encamped with 50,000 men on the shore.

Timoleon allied himself with Adranum and Tyndaris and received reinforcements from them. Marcus, the tyrant of Catana, joined him as well with a considerable army. Many of the outlying Syracusan forts followed in order to gain their independence. The Corinthians sent ten more ships to Syracuse as reinforcements. For an unknown reason the Carthaginians retreated and returned with all their forces to their own territory. Hicetas was left isolated and Timoleon victoriously occupied Syracuse. Then he proceeded to recover Messana, which had gone over to the Carthaginians. Finally, in 343/342 BC Timoleon convinced Dionysius to surrender Ortygia in return for exile in Corinth. He was allowed to retain his private possessions, but lived the rest of his life in poverty. This completed Timoleon's capture of the city.

=== Account of Plutarch ===
After Timoleon had arrived in Tauromenium with 1,000 soldiers, Hicetas asked the Carthaginians for reinforcements, who sent a large number of triremes to occupy the harbor of Syracuse. Because there was a dispute between two factions in Adranum, one party invited Hicetas and the other party invited Timoleon to intervene or mediate. Both generals marched to Adranum and arrived around the same time. Hicetas had 5,000 men and Timoleon no more than 1,200, but the army of Hicetas was caught unprepared. Timoleon's army killed 300 of his troops and took 600 prisoner. Adranum then allied itself with Timoleon.

At this point Mamercus (whom Diodorus called Marcus), the tyrant of Catana, allied himself with Timoleon. Some other cities followed. Dionysius, who despised Hicetas but admired Timoleon, then offered to surrender Ortygia and his army to him. Timoleon sent 400 of his men to Ortygia, avoiding the naval blockade by the Carthaginians, where they took command over the 2,000 men who served Dionysius. Dionysius himself was exiled to Corinth with a small amount of his treasure. The surrender of Dionysius happened within fifty days after Timoleon had landed in Sicily. When the Corinthians heard of his success, they sent 2,000 foot and 200 horse to reinforce Timoleon. These reinforcements had to stop at Thurii in Southern Italy, unable to continue because the Carthaginians controlled the sea.

Hicetas sent assassins to kill Timoleon at Adranum, but the attempt failed. He still had Ortygia besieged, but used only a small amount of Carthaginian reinforcements. He called for the Carthaginian general Mago to occupy Syracuse with his entire force. Mago occupied the harbor with 150 ships and encamped 60,000 infantry in the part of the city on the Sicilian mainland. Timoleon's force which occupied Ortygia started suffering from a lack of food due to the blockade. Timoleon ordered fishing boats and light skiffs from Catana to supply Ortygia with grain. Especially in stormy weather, these were effective blockade runners because the Carthaginian triremes had to keep their distance from each other due to the rough sea.

Hicetas and Mago noticed the supply ships coming from Catana and marched towards that city to take it. The Corinthian commander of the besieged garrison, Neon, noticed that the troops left to defend the part of Syracuse on the mainland had become inattentive and careless. He made a surprise attack on them and captured the neighborhood Achradina, securing grain and money in the process. Because Achradina was strongly fortified, he did not retreat to the acropolis at Ortygia. He connected it with the fortifications on Ortygia and defended both. When Hicetas and Mago heard of this they were already near Catana, but they returned immediately. They failed to take Catana and were not able to retake Achradina either. After this, the Corinthian reinforcements who were halted at Thurii decided to travel to Rhegium over land and managed to cross over to Sicily, avoiding the Carthaginian navy.

When the reinforcements had all crossed over, Timoleon used them to occupy Messana. After combining his forces for a total of 4,000 men, he marched on Syracuse. When Mago heard of this, he became worried. Combined with his fear of betrayal by Hicetas, he decided to flee with his fleet back to Libya. Hicetas still held on to the parts of Syracuse he controlled, which were strongly fortified. Timoleon divided his forces for the final attack. He himself attacked along the river. A second force led by Isias the Corinthian attacked from Achradina. The third group which attacked Epipolae was led by Deinarchus and Demaretus, who had brought the reinforcements from Corinth. The three groups all attacked at once and put the forces of Hicetas to flight. Allegedly, not a single soldier of Timoleon's army was killed or even wounded.

== Aftermath ==
After becoming master over the city, Timoleon had the citadel and the tyrant's palace on Ortygia demolished and restored democratic government to Syracuse. The independence of the fortified towns surrounding the city was restored.

Hicetas had managed to flee to Leontini with a substantial part of his army. In 342/341 BC Timoleon besieged Leontini, but broke off the siege when he failed to take it. Timoleon then besieged Engyum to depose the tyrant Leptines and restore democracy to that city. While Timoleon was away, Hicetas attempted to besiege Syracuse with his entire army. He had to retreat with heavy losses. Mago committed suicide, but his corpse was impaled by the Carthaginians, who were outraged over his cowardice and failure. They sent a new army to Sicily, which was defeated by Timoleon in the Battle of the Crimissus in 339 BC. Diodorus mentions that Timoleon and Hicetas agreed on a short truce so that Timoleon could use the troops of Hicetas to fight the Carthaginians. Plutarch does not mention this however.

In 339/338 BC Timoleon made peace with Carthage. The terms were that all the Sicilian Greek cities would be free and that the Lycus river would be the border between their territories. Also, the Carthaginians would not give aid to the tyrants who were at war with Syracuse. He finally defeated Hicetas and had him executed. He succeeded in deposing all the tyrants of Sicily.

Sicily was depopulated by the war. The marketplace of Syracuse had become a pasture for horses, while deer and wild swine roamed freely in other cities. Timoleon requested Corinth to send colonists to repopulate Syracuse. Plutarch mentions 10,000 settlers came from Corinth and the rest of Greece. With additional settlers arriving from Italy and other places in Sicily, Plutarch gives a total number of 60,000. According to Diodorus Syracuse received 40,000 colonists and Agyrium 10,000. Furthermore, he writes that Timoleon transferred the people of Leontini to Syracuse and sent additional settlers to Camarina.

== Sources ==
- Bicknell, P. J. (1984). "The Date of Timoleon's Crossing to Italy and the Comet of 361 B. C.". The Classical Quarterly. 34 (1): 130–134. doi:10.1017/S0009838800029360. JSTOR 638342.
- Diodorus Siculus (1947). Geer, Russell M. (ed.). Library of History. Vol. 9. Cambridge, Massachusetts: Harvard University Press. ISBN 978-0-674-99415-7.
- Diodorus Siculus (1954). Geer, Russell M. (ed.). Library of History. Vol. 10. Cambridge, Massachusetts: Harvard University Press. ISBN 978-0-674-99429-4.
- Plutarch (1918). "Life of Timoleon". In Perrin, Bernadotte (ed.). Lives. Vol. 6. Cambridge, Massachusetts: Harvard University Press. ISBN 978-0-674-99109-5.
