= McGhee =

McGhee is a surname. Notable people with the surname include:

== People with the surname ==
- Alison McGhee (born 1960), American author
- Bill McGhee (1905–1984), American baseball player
- Brownie McGhee (1915–1996), American blues musician
- Carla McGhee (born 1968), American basketball player
- Darius McGhee (born 1999), American basketball player
- David McGhee (born 1976), English football player
- Doc McGhee (born 1950), American band manager
- Ed McGhee (1924–1986), American baseball player
- Ethel McGhee Davis (1899–1990), American educator, social worker, and college administrator
- Fredrick McGhee (1861–1912), American lawyer and civil rights activist
- Gary McGhee (born 1988), American basketball player
- George C. McGhee (1912–2005), American geologist and diplomat
- George Louis McGhee (1925–2000), American marriage and family therapist
- George McGhee (footballer) (1883–1944), English footballer
- Heather McGhee (born 1980), American author
- Henry McGhee (1898–1959), British dentist and politician
- Howard McGhee (1918–1987), American jazz musician
- James McGhee (Hibernian) (1861-1921), Irish nationalist
- James McGhee (1862–1941), Scottish football player
- James William McGhee (1882–1968), American inventor
- Jim McGhee (1930–2019), Scottish footballer
- Jimmy McGhee (active 1920s), United States–based soccer player
- Joe McGhee (1929–2015), Scottish marathon runner
- John McGhee (1945–1975), Scottish football player
- Jordan McGhee (born 1996), Scottish football player
- Joseph McGhee (1872–1951), American politician
- Kanavis McGhee (born 1968), American football player
- Lorna McGhee (born 1972), Scottish flutist and teacher
- Mark McGhee (born 1957), Scottish football player and coach
- Marcus McGhee (born 1990) American mixed martial artist
- Melissa McGhee (born 1984), American singer
- Monta McGhee (born 1979), American basketball player
- Richard McGhee (1851–1930), Irish merchant and politician
- Stick McGhee (1918–1961), American blues guitarist
- Thomas McGhee (1929–2018), English footballer
- Timothy Joseph McGhee (born 1973), American mass murderer
- William McGhee (1930–2007), American actor

== See also ==
- McGhee family, an ancient lowland family of Scotland
- McGhee Tyson Airport, near Knoxville, Tennessee, United States
- Ghee
- Magee (disambiguation)
- McGee (disambiguation)
- McGhie
- McGehee, Arkansas
- McGehee (surname)
