= Magee =

Magee may refer to:

== People ==
- Magee (surname)

== Places and institutions ==
- Magee, Mississippi, a city in Simpson County, Mississippi, U.S.
- Magee, New York, also known as Magee's Corners, a hamlet in the Town of Tyre, Seneca County, New York, U.S.
- Magee, Queensland, a locality in Beebo, Goondiwindi Region, Australia
  - Magee railway station
- Magee College, a campus of Ulster University in Derry, County Londonderry, Northern Ireland
- Magee Secondary School, Vancouver, Canada
- Magee-Womens Hospital of University of Pittsburgh Medical Center, Pennsylvania, United States

== Other uses ==
- Magee of Donegal, clothing manufacturer and retailer, County Donegal, Ireland
- Maniac Magee, a novel by Jerry Spinelli published in 1990
- Magee, a nickname for the cavity magnetron, a microwave vacuum tube device

== See also ==
- Magi (disambiguation)
- Maji (disambiguation)
- Majhi (disambiguation)
- McGee (disambiguation)
- McGhee, a surname
- McGhie, a surname
- McGehee (surname)
- McGehee, Arkansas
