= George McGhee =

George McGhee may refer to:

- George C. McGhee (1912–2005), American oilman and diplomat
- George Louis McGhee (1925–2000), American marriage and family therapist
- George McGhee (footballer) (1883–1944), English footballer
- George McGhee (media executive), British media executive; see 2009 in British television

== See also ==
- McGhee, a surname
