= Mage =

Mage most commonly refers to:

- Mage (paranormal) or magician, a practitioner of magic derived from supernatural or occult sources
- Mage (fantasy) or magician, a type of character in mythology, folklore, and fiction
- Mage, a character class in some role-playing games
  - Mage (Dungeons & Dragons)
- Magus, a Zoroastrian priest

Mage(s) (or variations) may also refer to:

== Arts and entertainment ==
=== Games ===
- Mage: The Ascension, a 1993 role-playing game of the World of Darkness series
- Mage: The Sorcerers Crusade, a 1998 role-playing game of the World of Darkness series
- Mage: The Awakening, a 2005 role-playing game of the World of Darkness series
- Dark Ages: Mage, a 2002 supplement for the role-playing game Dark Ages: Vampire
- Mage (Archaeron), a 1980 rulebook for the Archaeron role-playing game system
- Mages (company), a Japanese video game manufacturer

=== Other media ===
- Mage (comics), an American superhero comic book
- Le Mage, an opera by Jules Massenet to a French libretto by Jean Richepin
- Kamen Rider Mage, a character in the TV series Kamen Rider Wizard

== Places ==
- Mage, Myanmar, a village in Kachin State
- Magé, a municipality in Rio de Janeiro, Brazil
  - Magé River
- Le Mage, Orne, a commune in the Orne department, France
- Mase, Switzerland, formerly known as Mage

== Science and technology ==
- Melanoma-associated antigen, a gene family
- Multiplex Automated Genome Engineering, in genetic recombineering
- MAGE-OM and MAGE-TAB, standards by the FGED Society

== Other uses ==
- Eugène Mage (1837–1869), French naval officer and explorer of Africa
- Mage (horse), the winner of the 2023 Kentucky Derby
- Mage, the bun portion of a traditional Japanese hairstyle
- Mage, a type of mask in ice hockey goaltending equipment

== See also ==
- Chonmage, a form of Japanese traditional topknot haircut worn by men
- Magi (disambiguation)
- Magician (disambiguation), including Archmage
- Magus (disambiguation)
- Warlock (disambiguation)
- Wizard (disambiguation)
- Witch (disambiguation)
- White wizard (disambiguation)
- White Witch (disambiguation)
