= Mamercus of Catane =

Tyrant of Catania from 344 BC to 338 BC

Mamercus (Ancient Greek: Μάμερκος) was tyrant of the Greek city of Catane, Magna Graecia, at the time when Timoleon landed in Sicily 344 BC until 338 BC. He was regarded by Plutarch as a warlike and wealthy man.

After the defeat of Hicetas at Adranum by Timoleon, Mamercus joined Timoleon and concluded a treaty of alliance with him. When Timoleon had not only made himself master of Syracuse, but defeated the Carthaginians in the great Battle of the Crimissus (339 BC), Mamercus became apprehensive that his ally's object was nothing less than the complete expulsion of all the tyrants from Sicily. In consequence, Mamercus entered into a league with Hicetas and the Carthaginians to oppose Timoleon's progress. At first they achieved a partial success, cutting to pieces a body of mercenaries in the Syracusan service. But Hicetas was defeated by Timoleon and fell into his hands, after which Timoleon marched against Catane. Mamercus met him in the field, but was defeated with heavy loss. So the Carthaginians concluded a peace with Timoleon.

Abandoned by his allies, Mamercus saw little chance of success and fled to Messana, where he took refuge with Hippo, tyrant of that city. Timoleon, however, quickly followed him and laid siege to Messana, both by sea and land, forcing Hippo to flee. Mamercus then surrendered to Timoleon, stipulating only for a regular trial before the Syracusans. But as soon as he was brought into the assembly of the people there, he was condemned by acclamation and executed like a common criminal.

Cornelius Nepos hints that Mamercus was not a Sicilian by birth, but had first come to the island as a leader of Italian mercenaries. Plutarch states that Mamercus prided himself much upon his skill in poetry, apparently with little reason, based on the two verses by Mamercus that have been preserved.

== See also ==
- List of ancient Greek tyrants
