= McGhie =

McGhie is a Scottish surname with Gaelic origins. It is derived from the word "Mac Gaidh", which means "son of the stranger". Notable people with the surname include:

- Billy McGhie (footballer, born 1958), Scottish professional footballer
- Billy McGhie (footballer, born 1961), Scottish professional footballer and manager
- Francesca McGhie, Scottish rugby union player
- Gordon McGhie, Canadian music composer
- Gordon McGhie (1907–1975), Australian rugby union player
- James McGhie, Lord McGhie (born 1944), Scottish judge
- John McGhie (1914–1985), Scottish army psychiatrist
- Robert McGhie (born 1951), Australian rules footballer

== See also ==
- Chiefs of McGhie, heads of families of Clan McGhie, a lowland branch of Clan Mackay, an ancient Scottish family
- Magee (disambiguation)
- McGee (disambiguation)
- McGhee, a surname
