= Neon (classical antiquity) =

Neon (Ancient Greek: Νέων) was the name of a number of figures from classical antiquity:

- A Corinthian officer who accompanied Timoleon in his expedition to Sicily and was appointed by him to command the citadel of Syracuse, when that fortress was placed in his hands by Dionysius II. In this post Neon not only held out against the combined efforts of Hicetas and the Carthaginian general Mago, but took advantage of their absence on an expedition against Catana, to make himself master of the important quarter of Acradina.
- A Messenian, son of Philiades, and brother of Thrasybulus, who was accused by Demosthenes of having betrayed his country to Philip II of Macedon. An elaborate vindication of his conduct, together with that of others of his contemporaries who had adopted the same line of policy, is given by the historian Polybius.
- An officer who commanded under Demetrius Poliorcetes in the great sea-fight off Salamis in Cyprus in 306 BC.
- A Boeotian, who was one of the leaders of the Macedonian party in his native country during the reign of Antigonus III Doson. An accident put it in his power to confer a great personal obligation upon that monarch: for Antigonus having touched with his fleet on the coast of Boeotia, the ships were all left aground by a sudden change of tide: Neon, who was hipparch at the time, came up with the Boeotian cavalry, but instead of taking advantage of the situation of Antigonus, he allowed him to depart in safety. For this act he incurred much censure from his countrymen, but obtained a high place in the favor of Antigonus and his successor Philip V of Macedon.
- A Theban, probably grandson of the preceding, who took a prominent part in the politics of Boeotia during the disputes between the Romans and Perseus of Macedon. He was one of the principal authors of the alliance concluded by the Boeotians with Perseus, on which account he was driven into exile, when the cities of Boeotia submitted to the Roman deputies Marcius and Aulus Atilius Serranus in 172 BC. Hereupon he took refuge with Perseus, to whose fortunes he seems to have henceforward closely attached himself, as he was one of the three companions of the king's flight after the decisive Battle of Pydna. He eventually fell into the hands of the Romans, by whom he was executed the following year, 167 BC.
