= Siege of Medina Fort =

- Part of the French colonial wars
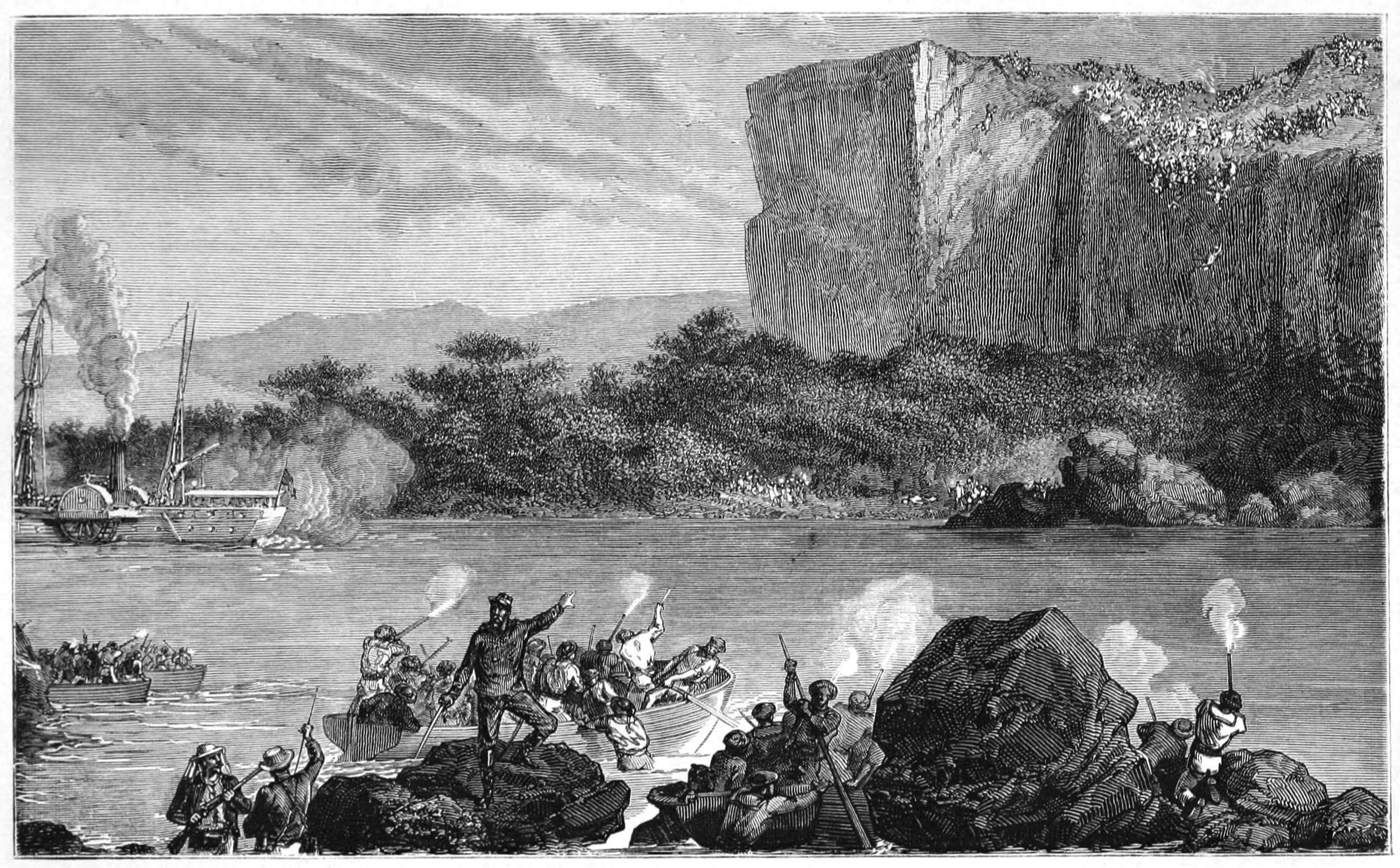
- Eugene Mage's view of the lifting of the siege of Fort Medina, from Voyage dans le Soudan occidental (1868)
Date	20 April – 18 July 1857
Location	Médine, present day Mali
Result	French victory

Belligerents
(Second French Empire) French Empire; Khasso	Toucouleur Empire

Commanders and leaders
Paul Holle; Louis Faidherbe	Omar Saidou Tall

Strength
1,000 soldiers (64 with modern firearm knowledge); 4 cannons Relief force: 800 soldiers and 2 gunboats	15,000 soldiers

Casualties and losses
31 killed 95 wounded	2,000 killed many wounded

The siege of Fort Medina took place in 1857 at Médine, on the left bank of the Senegal River in present-day Mali. The Toucouleur forces of Omar Saidou Tall unsuccessfully besieged native and French colonial troops commanded by Paul Holle. After 97 days of siege, a relief force under French Governor Louis Faidherbe lifted the siege and forced the Toucouleur army to retreat.

== Background ==
Although France had been present on the coast of what is now Senegal since the 17th century with Saint-Louis and Gorée, it had never attempted to expand outside of these two settlements. In 1854 however, Colonel Louis Faidherbe was appointed Governor of Senegal and soon began an expansion of French interests into Waalo and up the Senegal River, alongside which the French began establishing a series of forts. The army moved troops, cannon and other supplies by steamship where possible and overland where not.

In 1848, Omar Tall launched his jihad against neighboring Malinké regions. By 1855, his rapid expansion had led to several skirmishes with the French army. With the authorization of his ally, Khasso Queen Hawa Demba Diallo, Governor Faidherbe ordered a fort built at the Khasso village of Medina, not far from Kayes.

== Siege ==
In late April 1857, the entire Toucouleur army, roughly 20,000 warriors under Oumar Tall, marched on the village of Médine.

Fort Médine's garrison consisted of the fort's commander Paul Holle, seven white French soldiers, 22 Senegalese Tirailleurs and 34 sailors from Saint-Louis. The population of the village, numbering roughly 6,000 immediately sought shelter in the fort as the Toucouleur forces appeared.

On April 20, the Toucouleur launched their first assault on the fort. Using ladders made from palm tree branches, Toucouleur warriors attempted to climb the wall, under devastating rifle and cannon fire from the defenders. French firepower proved too strong however, and the Toucouleur eventually withdrew from the walls, leaving 300 dead behind. The French had lost 6 killed and 13 wounded in the attack.

In the night of 11 May, some 200 Toucouleur warriors landed on a small island on the river about 100 meters from the fort, where large rocks gave them a well covered position to fire on the fort while being protected from French fire. In the morning, Holle sent sergeant Desplats with 8 tirailleurs and 3 sailors in a summarily fortified boat to attack the Toucouleur party from behind. The surprised Toucouleur warriors left their cover in panic and half of them were killed by the fort's defenders' heavy fire, while many others drowned while hastily fleeing from the island.

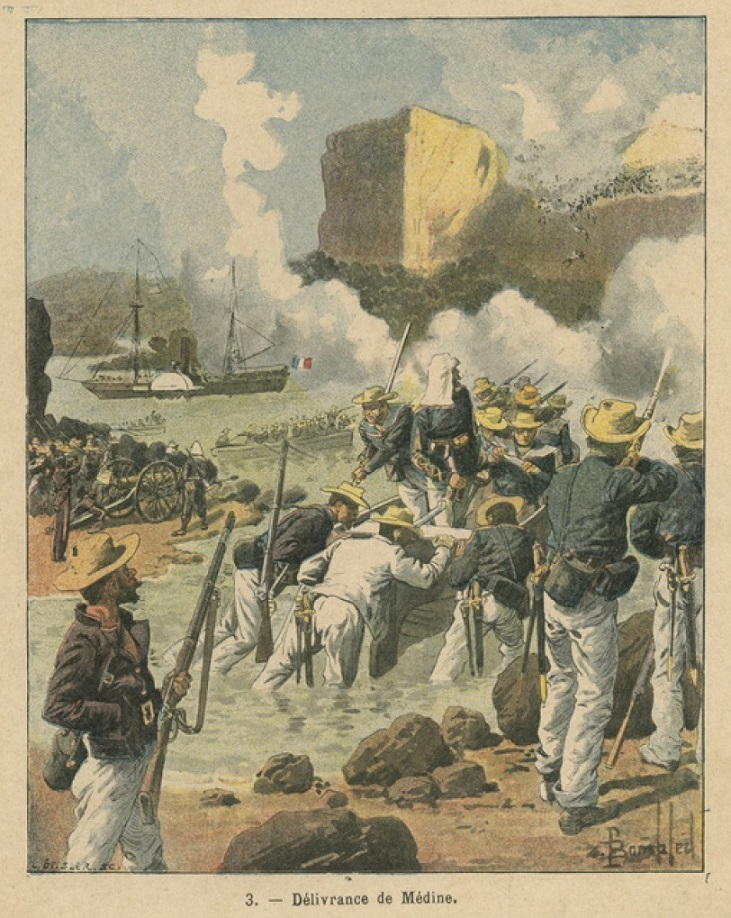
Faidherbe lifting the siege

In the night of 4-5 June, the Toucouleur army attempted a second assault on the fort, but it was less resolute than the first one and was easily repulsed by the French. However, French ammunition and food reserves were running low.

Due to the low tide of the river, Holle was rather pessimistic about the arrival of a relief force. Along with sergeant Desplats, he took some dispositions to blow up the fort should the enemy manage to take over. To avoid affecting the morale of the defenders, both men kept it a secret from the rest of the troops.

On 2 July, Governor Faidherbe and the gunboat Basilic had departed from Saint-Louis to rescue Fort-Médine, but the low level of the river prevented them from reaching their goal. In the night of July 17 however, the flow of the river finally increased after massive rains, and the Basilic could finally continue its way upstream.

On 18 July, Faidherbe arrived at Médine on the Basilic, alongside 400 tirailleurs and 100 white troops. After landing, Faidherbe's men launched a bayonet charge on a small hill held by some Toucouleur warriors, and from there unleashed a heavy rifle and artillery fire on the main Toucouleur force below. As the Toucouleurs fled alongside the river toward the fort, men who had remained on the Basilic sprayed them with an intense gunfire. The Toucouleur army disbanded and left the vicinity of Médine in disorganized retreat. As soon as the enemy had disappeared from sight, the starved civilians hidden in the fort came out to eat grass and roots nearby. Once the fighting was over, the Basilic discharged its food supply to the fort.

For his stubborn defense of Fort-Médine, Paul Holle was awarded the Legion of Honour.

== Consequences ==
Following the relief of Fort Médine, Faidherbe signed a treaty with Omar Tall gaining concessions for the French down to the Niger River.

Realizing the difficulties of attacking the well-equipped French, Omar Tall turned his attention to the neighboring Bambara Empire, conquering most of its territory including its capital of Ségou in 1861. However, the French continued to expand their West African presence, conquering Ségou and the Toucouleur Empire less than thirty years after Omar Tall's death.

== Present-day Medine ==
The Fort of Médine is open to the public. The Fort is located about 12 km east of Kayes on the "road to Bamako." There is also an old railroad station and European-style cemetery with graves from the mid-19th century. The village population is around 1800 with a small market daily.
