= Good witch =

Good witch may refer to:

- White witch, a practitioner of folk magic for benevolent purposes
- Locasta, the Good Witch of the North in the 1900 novel The Wonderful Wizard of Oz
- Glinda, the Good Witch of the North in the 1939 film The Wizard of Oz
- Good Witch (franchise), an American-Canadian media franchise of television films, series, and specials
  - The Good Witch, first film in the franchise
  - Good Witch (TV series), a television series in the franchise
- The Good Witch (album), an album by Maisie Peters, or the title track, 2023

== See also ==
- The Good Witch of the West (Nishi no Yoki Majo (西の善き魔女)), a fantasy novel series
- Wendy the Good Little Witch, American comics character and comic book
- The Good Fairy (disambiguation)
- White Witch (disambiguation)
- Wicked Witch (disambiguation)
