= Robert Noble (company) =

Scottish weaving and textiles business

Robert Noble is a weaving and textiles subsidiary company owned by Magee Weaving. It was historically based in the Scottish borders town of Peebles. The origins of the company can be traced back to 1666 when it was formed in Galashiels under the name of David Ballantyne. It was at one time listed amongst the oldest surviving UK businesses.

During the next two hundred years the company grew, developed and over time was merged with other businesses including George Roberts & Co. of Selkirk, Walter Thorburn of Hawick and Henry Ballantyne of Walkerburn. In 1884 it moved to a new purpose built mill at March Street in Peebles; the home of Robert Noble until late 2015.

During the twentieth century Ballantyne's formed part of the Dawson International business. However, during the latter part of the twentieth century the UK textiles industry went through various re-structuring and Robert Noble was sold off as a separate business.

The Robert Noble business had lost significant sales in early 2000s when Ministry of Defence contracts for Scottish Regiments were sent outside the UK.

In 2015, after trying to sell the company privately, the management publicly put the site up for sale. Unable to find buyers for the site, Robert Noble was sold to Magee's in Ireland and Replin was sold to AW Hainsworth based in Yorkshire. After the Scottish Government rejected Moorbrook Ltd’s proposals for redevelopment of the site, it agreed to Peebles Community Trust’s request to register a Community Right to Buy (CRtB), which would allow the community first option, under certain conditions, to negotiate purchase of the land should the owners place it on the open market.
