= White wizard =

White wizard or white mage may refer to:

- White Mage (Final Fantasy), a character class in the series
- White Wizard, a character in the episode "The Dragon's Secret" of Scooby-Doo! Mystery Incorporated
- White Wizard, a character in Kamen Rider Wizard
- White Mage, a character in 8-Bit Theater
- White wizard, a seal in the Dreamspell Mayan calendar interpretation and game
- White Wizard, a variation of the drinking game Wizard Staff
- Burling Hull (1889–1982), nicknamed The White Wizard, an American magician
- White Wizard Games, an American games company

== See also ==
- White Wizzard, an American heavy metal band
- White Witch (disambiguation)
- Wizard (disambiguation)
  - Wizard (fantasy)
- Mage (disambiguation)
- Gandalf the White, in J. R. R. Tolkien's novels
