= Magi (disambiguation) =

Magi are priests in Zoroastrianism and earlier Iranian religions.

Magi may also refer to:

== People ==
- Andrea Magi (born 1966), Italian boxer
- Biblical Magi, distinguished foreigners who visited and presented gifts to Jesus after his birth
- Magi (gamer), gaming handle of American esports player Sasha Italia Sullivan (born 1999)
- Magy (actor) (Magī), stage name of Japanese actor Yūichi Kojima (born 1972)
- Mägi, an Estonian surname

== Places ==
- Mago River (or Magi River), a river in southern Ethiopia
- Moscow complex of TsAGI (MAGI), a branch of the Central Aerohydrodynamic Institute (TsAGI), a Russian aerospace research institute

== Arts and entertainment ==
- Magi (film), a 2016 Turkish horror film
- Magi: The Labyrinth of Magic, a Japanese manga series

== Other uses ==
- Magi language (Central Province), a Papuan language of Central Province, Papua New Guinea
- Magi language (Madang Province), a Papuan language of Madang Province, Papua New Guinea
- Male accessory gland infection (MAGI), a medical condition
- Mathematical Applications Group (MAGI), an American computer technology company
- Modified adjusted gross income (MAGI), an American income tax calculation
- Membrane-associated guanylate kinase inverted 1, 2, and 3 (MAGI1, MAGI2, and MAGI3), human protein-coding genes

== See also ==
- Mage (disambiguation)
- Magee (disambiguation)
- Maggi (disambiguation)
- Magus (disambiguation)
- Maji (disambiguation)
- Maghi, a Hindu and Sikh festival
