= Gilbert M'Gy, 2nd Lord of Balmage =

Scottish landowner

Gilbert M'Gy (Scottish Gaelic: Gillebhride MagAoidh) of that Ilk, 2nd Lord of Balmage, 3rd Chief of the Name and Arms of McGhie (1370–1426) was a Scottish landowner and head of the powerful McGhie branch of the Clan Mackay, which, effectively operated independently, using its own coat of arms and seals and owning swathes of land in Kirkcudbrightshire for over a thousand years, from the 9th to the 19th centuries, at which point the estates were sold and the chiefly family slid, of its own accord, into relative obscurity.

M'Gy (whose name is variously recorded as Macge, M'Ke, M'Gy and McGhie) had a charter from the King for the lands of Balmaghie in Galloway, and was the direct descendant of Prince Aodh Ethelred, Earl of Moray and son of King Malcolm III.

He married Mariota de Keth and had a son, William, 2nd Lord. He was the ancestor of Sir John M'Ghie.

== See also ==
- Chiefs of McGhie
