= Magus (disambiguation) =

A magus is a priest in Zoroastrianism and earlier Iranian religions.

Magus or The Magus may also refer to:

== Arts and entertainment ==
=== Fictional characters ===
- Magus (comics), the name of three alternative versions of Adam Warlock in Marvel Comics
- Magus (Marvel Comics), an extraterrestrial villain in Marvel Comics
- Magus, a character in the video game Chrono Trigger
- Magus, a character in The Queen's Thief novel series by Megan Whalen Turner

=== Literature ===
- The Magus (Barrett book), 1801
- The Magus (novel), by John Fowles, 1965

=== Other uses in arts and entertainment ===
- Magus (album), by Thou, 2018
- Magus (video game), 2014
- The Magus (film), 1968, based on the novel

== People ==
- Simon Magus, religious figure in the Acts of the Apostles
- Shiv Nadar (born 1945), Indian billionaire businessman and philanthropist nicknamed "Magus"

== Other uses ==
- The Magician (tarot card), also known as The Magus

== See also ==
- Mage (disambiguation)
- Magi (disambiguation)
- Magician (disambiguation)
- Mago (disambiguation)
