= Paul Holle =

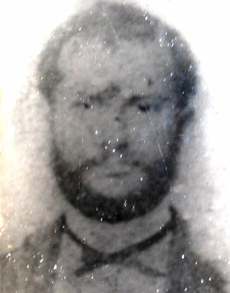
- Born: 1807; Saint-Louis, present day Senegal
- Died: 27 March 1862 (aged 54–55); Médine, present day Mali
- Military career
- Allegiance: (Second French Empire) French Empire
- Branch: French Army
- Service years: 1830s–1862
- Rank: Commandant
- Conflicts: Siege of Fort Médine
- Awards: Legion of Honour

Paul Holle (1807-1862) was a mixed-race French soldier and writer, best known for his staunch defense of Fort-Médine against the besieging Toucouleur army of El Hadj Omar Tall between April and July 1857.

== Early life ==
Paul Holle was born in 1807 in Saint-Louis, to a French merchant and a local signare woman.

Little is known about Holle's early life. At some point during his youth he worked for baron Jacques-François Roger.

Holle later joined the French army and became commander of the frontier post of Bakel in 1840, before being appointed to the command of the newly built Fort-Médine in 1855.

In late 1855, Holle co-wrote with Frédéric Carrère, the head of Saint-Louis' Department of Justice, a book titled De la Sénégambie Française in which they exposed their opinion on what the future of the colony should be.

== Siege of Fort Médine ==
In April 1857, the Toucouleur army of Oumar Tall, about 20,000 warriors, laid siege to Fort-Médine, where Paul Holle was stationed The garrison under Holle's command consisted in seven white French soldiers, 22 Senegalese Tirailleurs and 34 sailors from Saint-Louis The population of the village, numbering roughly 6,000, immediately sought shelter in the fort as the Toucouleur forces appeared.

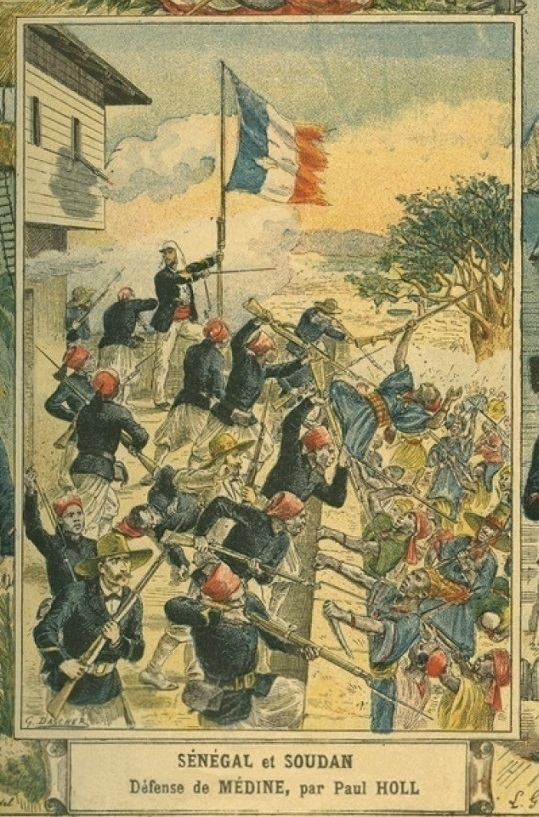
Paul Holle at the Siege of Fort-Médine

On April 20, the Toucouleur launched their first assault on the fort. Using ladders made from palm tree branches, Toucouleur warriors attempted to climb the wall, under devastating rifle and cannon fire from the defenders. French firepower proved too strong however, and the Toucouleur eventually withdrew from the walls, leaving 300 dead behind. The French had lost 6 killed and 13 wounded in the attack.

In the night of 11 May, some 200 Toucouleur warriors landed on a small island on the river about 100 meters from the fort, where large rocks gave them a well covered position to fire on the fort while being protected from French fire. On the morning, Holle sent Sergeant Desplats with 8 tirailleurs and 3 sailors in a summarily fortified boat to attack the Toucouleur party from behind. The surprised Toucouleur warriors left their cover in panic and half of them were killed by the fort's defenders heavy fire, while many others drowned while hastily fleeing from the island.

In the night of 4–5 June, the Toucouleur army attempted a second assault on the fort, but it was less resolute than the first one and was easily repulsed by the French. However, French ammunitions and food reserves were dramatically running low. Despite the bad situation, Holle's resolve remained unwavering. On the gate of the fort, he hooked a sign on which was written "To win or to die! For God and the Emperor!".

On the morning of 18 June, Governor Louis Faidherbe arrived to Médine on the sloop Basilic, alongside 400 tirailleurs and 100 white troops. Upon landing, Faidherbe's men launched a bayonet charge on a small hill held by some Toucouleur warriors, and from there unleashed a heavy fire on the main Toucouleur force below. As the Toucouleurs fled alongside the river toward the fort, men who had remained on the Basilic subjected them to an intense gunfire. The Toucouleur army then disbanded and left the area of Médine in a disorganized retreat.

For his heroic and stubborn defense of Fort-Médine, Holle was awarded the Legion of Honour through a decree signed by Emperor Napoleon III's own hand.

== Later life and death ==
After the Siege of Medina, Holle was briefly put in charge of the fort of Matam, before being once again put in command of Médine, where he died of natural causes on 27 March 1862. He is buried in the local cemetery.

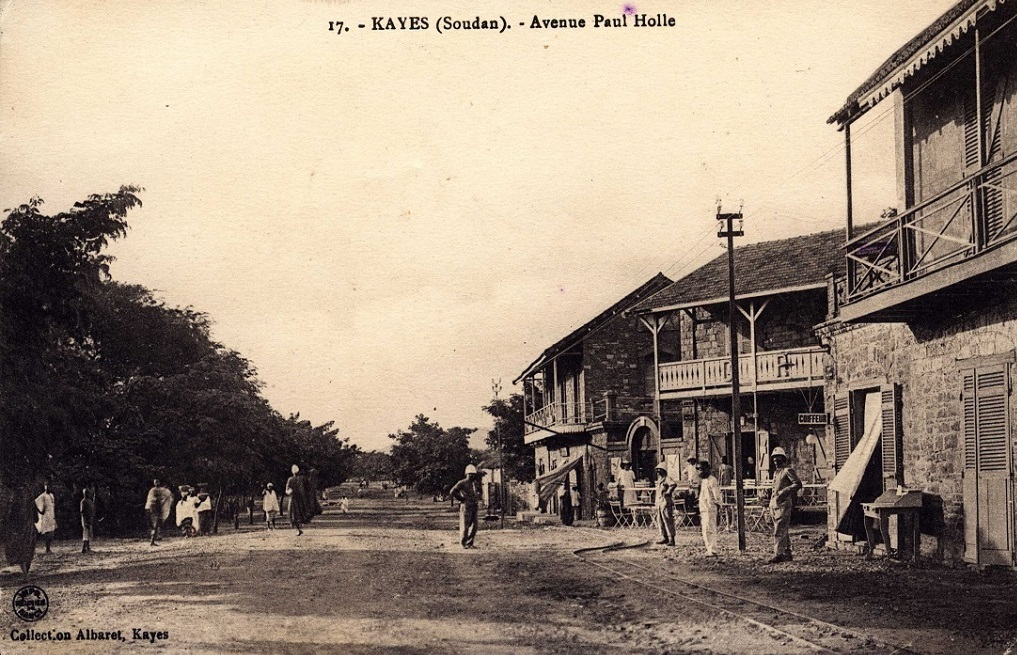
Avenue Paul Holle in Kayes, circa 1910

== Legacy ==
After Paul Holle's death, Governor Faidherbe erected a memorial in Médine, with a commemorative plaque reading: "Paul Holle, born in Saint-Louis, Commander of Médine, covered himself with glory while defending his post against El Hadj Omar".

Several streets in various cities of colonial French West Africa were named after Paul Holle.
