= Sacred Band of Carthage =

Carthaginian infantry unit

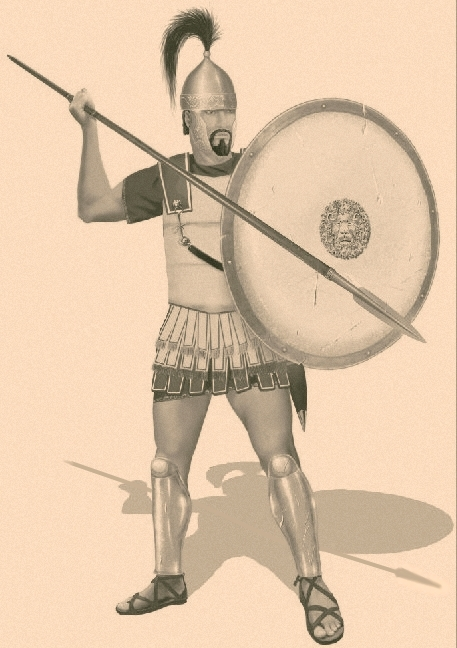
A reconstruction of the Sacred Band.

The Sacred Band of Carthage is the name used by ancient Greek historians to refer to an elite infantry unit of Carthaginian citizens that served in military campaigns during the fourth century BC. It is unknown how they identified themselves or whether they were considered a distinct formation.

The Sacred Band was highly atypical since Carthaginian citizens generally only served as officers or cavalry; the bulk of Carthaginian armies was usually made up of foreign mercenaries, infantry from allied communities (who might be Punic colonists), and levies from client states. It consisted of 2,000-3,000 heavy infantry drawn from the wealthiest families of Carthage; Plutarch describes its members as "inferior to none among them as to birth, wealth, or reputation" and distinguished by "the splendour of their arms, and the slowness and order of their march". Trained from an early age to be tough phalanx spearmen, they fought in a well organized phalanx style developed in Greece. As in many Greek city-states and the early Roman Republic, members of the Sacred Band were armed and equipped at their own expense, and thus had high quality armor and weaponry.

The earliest known mention of this unit is in the first century AD by Diodorus Siculus, in his account of the Battle of the Crimissus in Sicily in 341 BC. He describes the Carthaginians being ambushed by Greek forces while crossing the river Crimissus, and the prolonged engagement that followed during torrential rain. "Even the Carthaginians who composed the Sacred Band, twenty-five hundred in number and drawn from the ranks of those citizens who were distinguished for valour and reputation as well as for wealth, were all cut down after a gallant struggle".

In the second century AD, Plutarch writes of the same events, but makes no explicit mention of the Sacred Band. He describes Carthaginian forces as consisting of 10,000 infantrymen bearing white shields, wearing splendorous armor, and marching in a disciplined manner. Among the casualties of the battle, he notes that "three thousand were those of Carthaginians, a great affliction for the city. For no others were superior to these in birth or wealth or reputation". The number and description of this force are roughly analogous to the account of Diodorus, and most likely describe the Sacred Band.

Two thousand citizen troops from Carthage are recorded as being in Sicily in 311 BC, during another conflict with the Greeks. It is the last time that citizens troops are known to have deployed abroad. By 310 BC, the Sacred Band appears to have been revived: in the Battle of White Tunis, which took place in North Africa against King Agathocles of Syracuse, one wing of Carthaginian forces was composed of the Sacred Band, under the command of Hanno. Agathocles stationed himself on the Greek wing opposing Hanno, along with 1,000 hoplite bodyguards. This may indicate that the Greeks were aware of the Sacred Band and its reputation, perhaps recognizing the unit's superior armor or distinctive white color. Diodorus writes that the Sacred Band fought valiantly, even after Hanno was killed and the rest of the army withdrew to Carthage.

After its destruction at White Tunis, the "Sacred Band" disappears from historical record. Although Carthaginian citizen infantry appear in historical sources during later wars, their numbers are significantly higher, implying an emergency levy of all available citizens, rather than an elite force. Larger citizen forces turned out during the First Punic War (namely the Battle of Bagradas), the Mercenary War, and the Third Punic War, but the "Sacred Band" or any other elite unit is not mentioned in any surviving accounts of these wars.

== See also ==
- Sacred Band of Thebes
- Military of Carthage
