= Mago (general) =

4th century BC Carthaginian army and fleet commander

Mago or Magon (Punic: 𐤌𐤂𐤍, mgn; Ancient Greek: Μάγων, Mágōn) was commander of the Carthaginian fleet and army in Sicily in 344 BC. When Timoleon had made himself master of the citadel of Syracuse after the departure of Dionysius, Hicetas, finding himself unable to cope single-handed with this new and formidable rival, called in the assistance of Mago, who appeared before Syracuse with a fleet of 150 triremes, and an army of 50,000 men. He did not, however, accomplish anything worthy of so great a force; not only were both he and Hicetas unable to make any impression on the island citadel, but while they were engaged in an expedition against Catania, Neon, the Corinthian governor of Syracuse, took advantage of their absence to make himself master of Achradina. Jealousies likewise arose between the Carthaginians and their Syracusan allies, and at length Mago, becoming apprehensive of treachery, suddenly relinquished the enterprise, and on the approach of Timoleon at the head of a very inferior force, sailed away with his whole fleet, and withdrew to Carthage. Here, his cowardly conduct excited such indignation that he put an end to his own life, to avoid a worse fate at the hands of his exasperated countrymen, who, nevertheless, proceeded to crucify his lifeless body. (Plut. Timol. 17–22; the same events are more briefly related by Diodorus Siculus, xvi. 69, but without any mention of the name of Mago.)

== See also ==
- Other Magos in Carthaginian history
