= Timophanes =

4th-century BC Corinthian general

Timophanes was an Ancient Corinthian and brother of the renowned Greek statesman and general Timoleon.

== Background ==
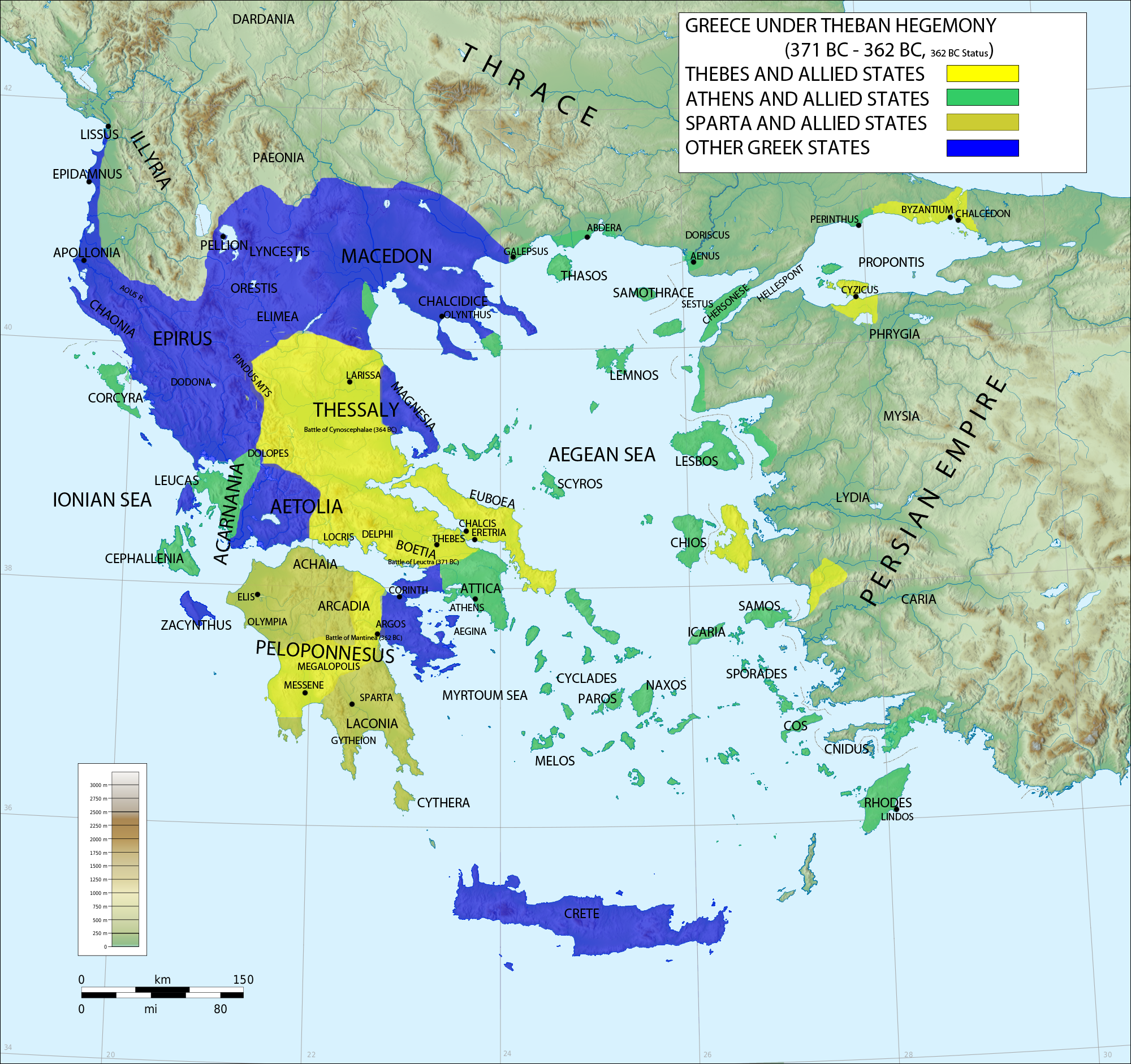
Ancient Corinth's political position in Hellas during the 360's .

During the 360s BC, the city-state of Corinth found herself in an unfamiliar and radically changing world. In the forty plus years since the end of the Peloponesian War, the political power houses of the eastern Mediterranean had changed fairly drastically. The city-states of Athens, Sparta and Thebes had each contended to become the political and military leaders of Hellas. This, in conjunction with interference from the Achaemenid Empire in the form of the so-called King's Peace, dictated by Artaxerxes II, and the rise of Jason of Pherae had created an unprecedented complex political environment on the Greek peninsula.

To the end of protecting her own interests, Corinth, a demokratia, gave Timophanes a force of four hundred mercenaries. He was given the command because of his popularity among his fellow citizens who perceived him as brave due to his military exploits. Corinth expected that Timophanes and the soldiers would serve as a deterrent to the city's many rivals in the Peloponnese and Attica, with Athens being named by Xenophon as a particular threat.

== Assassination ==
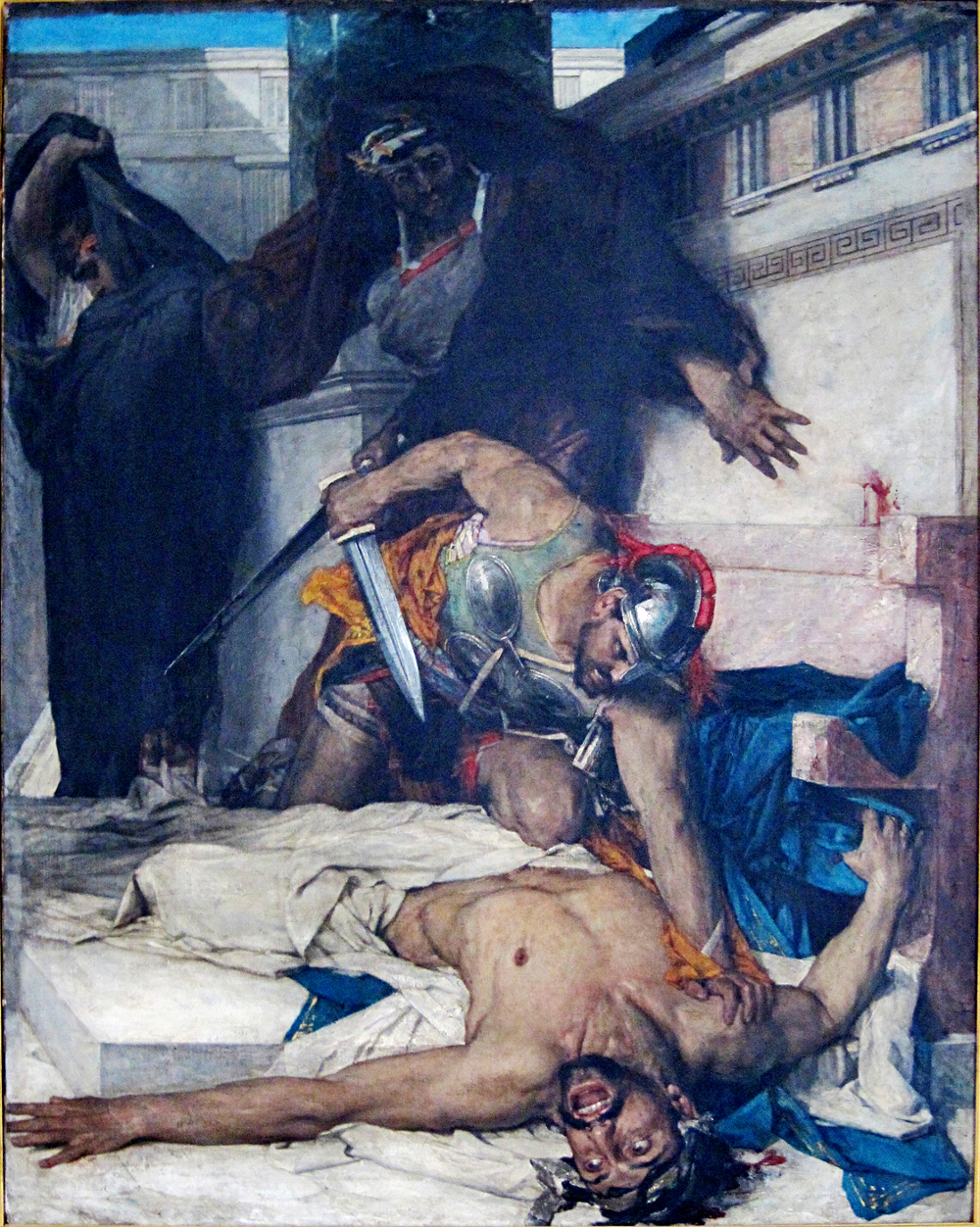
The Death of Timophanes by Léon Comerre (1874)

However, Timophanes was, as noted by Diodorus Siculus a man "of outstanding wealth" and used this to turn the mercenaries towards their previous employers. Diodorus relates how Timophanes would walk about the Corinthian market with “a band of ruffians” aiming towards installing himself as tyrant. He would go as far as putting to death a “great number of leading citizens”. He was publicly assassinated by his brother Timoleon with the assistance of Aeschylus, Timophanes' brother-in-law and the diviner Satyrus. According to Plutarch, Timoleon did not commit the deed himself but led the assassins into his brother's house with the pretext of desiring a meeting.
