= Wicked Witch (disambiguation) =

Wicked Witch is a name for:

- The hag, a stock character in fairy tales
- The Wicked Witch of the West, the main antagonist in L. Frank Baum's book The Wonderful Wizard of Oz as well as Metro-Goldwyn-Mayer's 1939 film adaptation
- The Wicked Witch of the West (Once Upon a Time) (known by the name Zelena), is a character from the ABC television series Once Upon a Time

It may also refer to:

- "Wicked Witch", a song by Nardo Wick from the album Who Is Nardo Wick? (2021)
- "Wicked Witch", a song by Lovebites from the album Judgement Day (2023)
- Wicked Witch Software, a video game developer

Other characters in the fictional land of Oz:

- Wicked Witch of the East
- Wicked Witch of the North, also known as Mombi
- Wicked Witch of the South

== Companies ==
- Wicked Witch, an Australian video game developer based in Melbourne.

== See also ==
- Wykked Wytch
- Wicked (disambiguation)
- Good witch (disambiguation)
