= Maji =

Maji may refer to:

== Places ==
- Maji, Ethiopia, city in southwestern Ethiopia
  - Maji (woreda)
- Maji, Iran, a village
- Maji, Luhe District, a town in Jiangsu Province, China

== Other uses ==
- Maji (surname), an Indian family name
- Dizi people, also known as Maji, an ethnic group in Ethiopia
  - Dizin language, or Maji, an Omotic language of Ethiopia spoken by the Dizi people

== See also ==
- Maji Maji Rebellion, a rebellion in German East Africa
- Majhi (disambiguation)
- Majji
- Magee (disambiguation)
- Magi (disambiguation)
- Machi (disambiguation)
