= Mago =

Mago may refer to:

== People ==
- Mago (agricultural writer), Carthaginian writer quoted and drawn on by Columella
- Mago Barca (243–203 BCE), Carthaginian general, son of Hamilcar Barca and brother of Hannibal
- Mago (fleet commander) (died 383 BCE), Carthaginian fleet commander, active in Sicily
- Mago (general), Carthaginian general active in Sicily in the mid 4th century BCE
- The Magonids of the ruling dynasty of Carthage from 550 BCE to 340 BCE
  - Mago I of Carthage (reigned c. 550 – c. 530 BCE)
  - Mago II of Carthage (reigned 396–375 BCE)
  - Mago III of Carthage (reigned 375–344 BCE)
- Andrea Bargnani known as "Il Mago" (b. 1985), Italian basketball player
- Francisco Mago Leccia (1931–2004), Venezuelan ichthyologist
- Hannibal Mago (died 406 BCE), Carthaginian shofet and general

== Places ==
- Mago, Minorca, a Carthaginian and later Roman town in Menorca
- Mago, Tawang, a village in Tawang district, Arunachal Pradesh, India
- Mago Chu, a river formed at the village of Mago in Tawang district
- Mago Island, an island in Fiji
- Mago National Park, in Ethiopia
  - Mago River, a tributary of the Omo river in Mago National Park, Ethiopia

== Music ==
- Mago (album), a 2007 album by Billy Martin and John Medeski
- Mago (musical instrument), an alternative spelling for Mako, the West Arnhem name for didgeridoo
- "Mago" (song), a 2020 single by GFriend from their album Walpurgis Night
- Mägo de Oz, a Celtic folk metal band from Spain

== Other uses ==
- HD 32518, a star with the approved name "Mago", named after the Mago National Park
- Mago (spider), a spider genus of the family Salticidae found in South America
- Magu (deity) or Mago, a Chinese and Korean goddess
- Nurarihyon no Mago, a manga series

== See also ==
- Magus (disambiguation)
