= Magee of Donegal =

Clothing company

Coordinates: 54°39′13.82″N 8°6′35″W

Magee
- Industry: Textiles, fashion
- Founded: 1866; 160 years ago in Donegal, Ireland
- Founder: John Magee
- Headquarters: Donegal, Ireland
- Key people: Lynn Temple (charman), Rosy Temple (CEO) Charlotte Temple, Patrick Temple
- Products: Wool, linen and other textiles; specialty is Donegal tweed
- Brands: Magee 1866, Magee Weaving (aka Magee of Donegal)
- Net income: ▼€−809,696
- Owner: Temple family
- Number of employees: 88 (2021)
- Parent: Donegal Bay Group, Ltd.
- Website: magee1866.com

Magee of Donegal are a textile manufacturer, clothing manufacturer and retailer, and manufacturer and retailer of home goods based in Donegal Town, County Donegal, Ireland. The company are known for their woollen Donegal tweed, but also manufacture items from linen, cashmere, silk and other materials.

== Organization & marks ==
Magee markets its wholesale and retail products separately. All brands are under the umbrella of the Donegal Bay Group, Ltd.. The business has three main parts: weaving, product design and production, and retail.

=== Weaving ===
Wholesale cloth is marketed to the garment industry under the name Magee Weaving. For products made by outside companies using Magee fabric, a green woven label, embroidered in gold thread, bearing the legend MAGEE OF DONEGAL is sewn into garments next to the brand label. An escutcheon with three birds is inserted between the descender of the letter M, with Fabric Made in Ireland subscribed to this, and the entire design enclosed in an oval shape.. J.Crew are a notable clothing brand which purchase Magee fabric to make items to their own specifications with their manufacturing partners.

=== Design and production ===
Finished goods designed by Magee from the company's fabrics, as well as retail quantities of fabric, are marketed under the name Magee 1866. This branding uses a blue label embroidered in gold thread with the brand's wolfhound logo subscribed with the legend MAGEE 1866 (see illustration, at right). Magee 1866 also has a made to measure programme.

=== Retail ===
Magee sells its finished products through its own Magee branded stores, as well as in collaboration with Arnotts, an Irish department store, and on its website.

== History ==
=== Founding ===
The company traces its origins to 1866, when the founder, John Magee (1849–1901), began traveling between local markets trading in cottage industry woven goods produced by Donegal fishermen and farmers. In 1866, he opened a draper shop in Donegal Town. In 1887, Magee hired his cousin, Robert Temple (1866–1958), as an apprentice, after observing the latter's sales acumen in transacting with hotel manager for some woodcocks. Temple acquired a partial interest in the company in 1901, purchasing the rest from his cousin in 1910.

=== Expansion ===
After the formation of the Irish Free State, a Magee warehouse was opened in Belfast to avoid customs duties in the United Kingdom. Robert's son Howard Temple (1913–2010) began working with his father in 1931. One of the most significant figures in the history of Donegal tweed, Howard Temple carried Magee to new heights. The number of weavers (both in-house and outworkers) were greatly increased and he began the process of making Donegal tweed an international brand. This operation was expanded in 1945 to produce ready-to-wear garments, a growing market, in contrast to the declining bespoke trade which the company had traditionally supplied. To this end he collaborated very closely with the Irish fashion designers Sybil Connolly and Irene Gilbert, who helped promote Donegal tweed to the wider fashion industry.In 1962, the company designed and produced green tweed uniforms for Aer Lingus. In 1966, Temple also established a large factory in Donegal Town manufacturing ready-to-wear men's clothes which at its peak employed approximately 300 people.

The first power looms were installed in 1977. The company employed its own cutting and sewing staff to make branded garments in Donegal until 2007, when it terminated in-house clothing production. Weaving operations were unaffected. As of 2022, the Magee 1866 retail brand stocks a limited range of finished products made in Ireland, including sweaters, shawls, linen shirts, notebooks, candles and throw blankets, in addition to the fabric that the company continues to manufacture in Donegal.

=== Twenty-first century ===
The current proprietors of Magee are Howard Temple's son Lynn and Lynn's children Charlotte and Patrick. Magee continues to be the largest and most famous producers of Donegal tweed.

In 2015, Donegal Bay Group purchased Robert Noble, a Scottish weaver owned by Moorbrook, Ltd., and whose sister mark, Replin, was sold to AW Hainsworth.

A media controversy erupted in 2020 when a lesbian woman planning to be fitted for a men's suit for a same-sex marriage made an appointment at the Magee Arnotts shop in Dublin. The woman, Maeve Wright, was told on arrival that the made-to-measure service was for men only, though she had been assured when booking the appointment that she could be served. Wright made an on-air complaint about her experience on the radio programme Liveline, which led to a response from CEO Rosy Temple, who called the incident a misunderstanding, and explained that the men's made-to-measure service used a men's pattern block. While Magee would be launching a specifically women's made-to-measure service later that year, the men's made-to-measure could be purchased by customers of either gender.

Magee has partnered with Donegal Yarns in Kilcar to source wool from Irish farmers, which is spun into yarn by Donegal Yarns before being woven by Magee. Patrick Temple has collaborated with sheep farmer James Lorinko to improve Donegal wool. In 2021, Magee created a new collection featuring a coat made from the resultant fabric.

The business was affected by COVID-19, with revenues falling from €14.14 million in 2019 to €7.61 million in 2020. Losses increased by €809,696 in 2021, but exports of finished cloth began increasing again. Employee head count decreased from 113 in 2019 to 79 in 2020, but increased again to 88 in 2021. The company received COVID-19-related government aid, and the extension of additional credit facilities from Enterprise Ireland.
