= Battle of the Crimissus =

Battle between Carthage and Syracuse (339 BC)

- Part of The Sicilian Wars
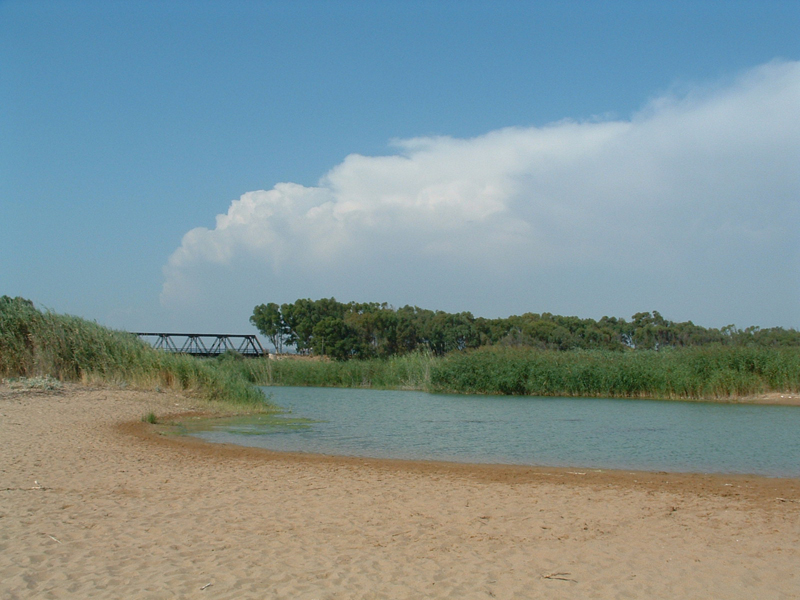
- Battle of the Crimissus
Date	339 BC
Location	Crimissus river, modern Freddo river, on Sicily, Italy 37°56′27″N 12°50′15″E
Result	Greek victory

Belligerents
Syracuse	Carthage

Commanders and leaders
Timoleon	Asdrubal; Hamilcar

Strength
Plutarch: 5,000 infantry 1,000 cavalry Diodorus Siculus: 12,000 total	Polyaenus: 50,000; Diodorus and Plutarch: 70,000

Casualties and losses
Unknown	Plutarch: 3,000 Carthaginians; 7,000 others 5,000+ prisoners Diodorus Siculus: 2,500 Sacred Band; 10,000 others 15,000 prisoners
- Location within Sicily Battle of the Crimissus (Italy) Battle of the Crimissus (Mediterranean)

The Battle of the Crimissus (also spelled Crimisus and Crimesus) was fought in 339 BC between a large Carthaginian army commanded by Asdrubal and Hamilcar and an army from Syracuse led by Timoleon. Timoleon attacked the Carthaginian army by surprise near the Crimissus river in western Sicily (originally it was thought that it was the modern Belice river in southwest Sicily, but it has been recently identified with the modern Freddo river in northwest Sicily) and won a great victory. When he defeated another much smaller force of Carthaginians shortly afterwards, Carthage sued for peace. The peace allowed the Greek cities on Sicily to recover and began a period of stability. However, another war between Syracuse and Carthage erupted after Timoleon's death, not long after Agathocles seized power in 317 BC.

Carthage had tried to prevent Timoleon's arrival on Sicily, where he had been invited by the citizens of Syracuse to depose the Greek tyrants and restore democracy and order. After liberating Syracuse itself, Timoleon sent his mercenaries to raid the Carthaginian territory on western Sicily. Carthage had already gathered a large army, which was moving towards Syracuse in response to the raids.

Vastly outnumbered, Timoleon attacked the Carthaginian army while it was crossing the Crimissus river. The Carthaginians fiercely resisted the initial assault, but a storm which started during the battle worked to the advantage of the Greeks. When the first rank of the Carthaginian army was defeated, the whole army was routed. The Greeks killed or captured many of those who fled and Carthage lost a large number of its wealthiest citizens in the battle.

== Background ==
Because the citizens of Syracuse suffered from political upheaval and civil war under the regime of Dionysius II, they appealed to Corinth (which had founded Syracuse) to send them a general to depose the tyrants and administer their city. The Corinthian senate chose to send Timoleon.

In 359/8 BC Dionysius II had made peace with Carthage. Carthage probably profited from the political instability on Sicily because it weakened the military power of the Greeks. As a consequence they tried to prevent Timoleon from setting foot on Sicily in 345/4 BC, but were unsuccessful. A confusing siege of Syracuse ensued in 344/3 BC with Timoleon, Dionysius, Hicetas and his Carthaginian allies each controlling different parts of the city. The two primary sources which describe the siege, Diodorus Siculus and Plutarch, give very different accounts. According to Plutarch Dionysius surrendered the acropolis to Timoleon right away and was expelled to Corinth. Diodoros states that this happened at the end of the siege in 343/2 BC. The Carthaginians broke off the siege and retreated. Timoleon then attacked the forces of Hicetas and drove them out of Syracuse.

Timoleon then proceeded to liberate the other Greek cities on Sicily in 342/1 BC in order to restore them their autonomy and democracy. He sent his mercenaries to raid the Carthaginian territory in western Sicily, which gained him a large amount of booty. As his military strength and reputation grew, all the other Sicilian Greek cities submitted to him voluntarily because of his policy of restoring autonomy to them. He was approached by many other cities under the control of Carthage, including those of the Sicels and the Sicanians, who wished to become his allies.

== Prelude ==
The Carthaginians were alarmed by Timoleon's success and shipped a large army to Lilybaeum. According to Plutarch it numbered seventy thousand men and included siege engines and chariots with four horses each. Their army was large enough to conquer Sicily in its entirety, even with the Greeks united under Timoleon. When they received news that their territory was being raided by Timoleon's mercenaries, they marched against them immediately under the command of Hasdrubal and Hamilcar. When the Syracusans heard about the coming of the huge Carthaginian army, they were terrified; Timoleon could gather no more than 3,000 of them to march against the Carthaginians. While on the march, 1,000 of Timoleon's 4,000 mercenaries deserted him and returned to Syracuse. His army now numbered 5,000 foot and 1,000 horse. He led them on march of eight days away from Syracuse towards the river Crimissus, where the Carthaginians were concentrating. Diodorus Siculus reports a greater size of Timoleon's army, giving a number of 12,000 men.

== Battle ==
The battle was fought in early June 339 BC. Timoleon was positioned on a hill with his army, overlooking a plain where the Carthaginian army was located. The Crimissus river separated the two armies and covered the plain in a thick fog, making it impossible to see the Carthaginian camp. However, the noise signaled to the Greeks that the Carthaginians were going to cross the river. The sun had risen higher in the sky and dissipated the fog in the plain, making the Carthaginian troops visible. The four-horse chariots were at the vanguard of the army. Behind them was infantry which the Greeks identified as Carthaginian citizens and at the rear were the foreign troops. Timoleon noticed the army was separated by the river, giving him a good opportunity to attack. He decided to send the cavalry ahead to prevent the Carthaginian citizen infantry from forming their phalanx.

Timoleon then commanded his army to descend into the plain. He assigned the other Sicilian Greeks and a few of his mercenaries to his wings. He commanded the center, which was composed of the Syracusans and his best mercenaries. He saw that his cavalry could not attack the enemy infantry because of the chariots. He ordered his cavalry to ride past the line of chariots to attack the infantry on the flank. He then charged the enemy with the infantry. The Carthaginian citizen infantry resisted the Greeks sturdily however, thanks to their excellent armor and large shields. Fortunately for the Greeks a thunderstorm rose up behind them and started a shower of hail and rain. The storm hit the Greeks in the back, but the Carthaginians in the face. The storm put them at a severe disadvantage: the water and mud made them ineffective fighters because of their heavy armor. To make things worse for the Carthaginians, the storm caused the Crimissus to overflow from its banks and many smaller streams to flow over the plain.

The Carthaginian army fled when the Greeks defeated the first rank of four hundred men. Many of those who fled over the plain were overtaken by the Greeks and killed. Some drowned in the river when they met the part of the Carthaginian army which still tried to cross the river. Out of the 10,000 casualties for the Carthaginian army, 3,000 were Carthaginian citizens. Carthage had never lost so many of its own citizens before because it was used to employing Libyans, Numidians and Iberians for its armies. At least 5,000 prisoners were accounted for, and many more were hidden or stolen by the Greek soldiers. As they stripped the dead bodies of their possessions, the Greeks acquired a great deal of gold and silver from the rich Carthaginian citizens. After the Greek army captured the Carthaginian camp so much effort was required to gather the spoils that it took until the third day to erect a trophy on the site.

Diodorus Siculus calls the Carthaginian citizen infantry as the Sacred Band of Carthage. He puts their number at 2,500 and states that they all fought to the death. Of the other nationalities of the army, more than 10,000 perished and 15,000 were taken captive.

== Aftermath ==
Timoleon left his mercenaries to plunder the Carthaginian territory and returned to Syracuse. Hicetas and Mamercus, the tyrants who still controlled respectively Leontini and Catana, made an alliance with the Carthaginians. The Carthaginians sent a fleet of seventy ships and Greek mercenaries under Gisco to their aid. This force landed in the territory of Messana, where they defeated four hundred of Timoleon's mercenaries. Another group of his mercenaries was ambushed and eliminated by the Carthaginians near Ietae, in Carthaginian territory.

Nevertheless, Plutarch relates that Timoleon managed to defeat Hicetas in the Battle of the Damurias River. Mamercus was defeated by Timoleon in the Battle of the Abolus River, in which the Carthaginian soldiers he received from Gisco made up a large part of the casualties. After this defeat Carthage decided to make peace with Timoleon, to which he agreed. The terms were that Carthage was to keep its territory within the Lycus river, to restore the family and property to anyone who wished to move to Syracuse and that it would end their alliance with the tyrants. Mamercus fled to Messana where he took refuge with the tyrant of that city, Hippo. When Timoleon besieged Messana by land and sea, Hippo tried to escape aboard a ship, but was caught and executed by the city's inhabitants. Mamercus then surrendered to Timoleon. In the account of Diodorus Siculus Hicetas is mentioned as well, but Mamercus and Hippo are not. Diodorus does mention other tyrants which Timoleon deposed: the Campanians in Aetna, Nicodemus in Centuripae and Apolloniades in Agyrium.

Timoleon succeeded in ending the warfare on Sicily between the Greek tyrants and with Carthage, but peace and stability did not last for long after his death. A new tyrant, Agathocles, seized power in Syracuse in 317 BC and started another war with Carthage.

== Sources ==
- Diodorus Siculus (1952). Sherman, Charles L. (ed.). Library of History. Vol. 7. Cambridge, Massachusetts: Harvard University Press. ISBN 978-0-674-99428-7.
- ——— (1963). Welles, C. Bradford (ed.). Library of History. Vol. 8. Cambridge, Massachusetts: Harvard University Press. ISBN 978-0-674-99464-5.
- Plutarch (1918). Perrin, Bernadotte (ed.). Parallel Lives. Vol. 6. Cambridge, Massachusetts: Harvard University Press. ISBN 978-0-674-99109-5.
- Talbert, R. J. A. (1974). Timoleon and the Revival of Greek Sicily: 344-317 B.C. Cambridge, United Kingdom: Cambridge University Press. ISBN 978-0-521-03413-5.
- Wilson, R. J. A. (2000). "Sicilia". In Talbot, Richard A. J. (ed.). Barrington atlas of the Greek and Roman world. Vol. 1. Princeton: Princeton University Press. pp. 709–735. ISBN 9780691031699.
