= Doeskin =

Doeskin is the split hide of an adult female deer with a velvet-like texture. It is frequently used for the manufacture of gloves. It accepts dye readily.

The term can also refer to a tightly-woven medium-weight wool fabric with a short soft nap similar to duvetyn.
