= White Witch (disambiguation) =

The White Witch, or Jadis, is a fictional character in The Chronicles of Narnia series.

White Witch may also refer to:

- White witch, a practitioner of magic for benevolent purposes

== Music ==
- White Witch (band), a 1970s American hard rock band
- White Witch (album), by Andrea True Connection, 1977
- "White Witch", a song by Savatage from the 1987 album Hall of the Mountain King

== Literature ==
=== Books ===
- The White Witch, an 1884 novel by Florence Warden
- The White Witch, a 1958 novel by Elizabeth Goudge
- White Witch, a 1988 novel by Bronwyn Williams
- Indiana Jones and the White Witch, a 1994 novel by Martin Caidin
- The White Witch, a 2000 novel by Barbara Cartland

=== Comics ===
- White Witch (DC Comics), a fictional character in DC Comics
- White Witch (Amalgam Comics) a fictional character

== Television ==
- The White Witch, an unproduced 1960s Doctor Who television serial
- "The White Witch" (Star Wars: Droids), the 1985 premiere episode of Star Wars: Droids
- "The White Witch", a 2000 episode of Amazon
- "White Witch" a 2001 episode of Scariest Places on Earth

== Other uses ==
- White witch moth, Thysania agrippina, a species in the family Erebidae
- White Witch of Rose Hall, a legendary story of a haunting in Jamaica

== See also ==
- Witch (disambiguation)
- Good witch (disambiguation)
- White Lady (disambiguation)
- White wizard (disambiguation)
- Stevie Nicks, who played a white witch version of herself in American Horror Story
