= The Good Fairy =

The Good Fairy may refer to:

- The Good Fairy (play), a 1930 play by Ferenc Molnár
- The Good Fairy (1935 film), written by Preston Sturges based on Molnár's play
- The Good Fairy (1951 film), directed by Keisuke Kinoshita based on a novel by Kunio Kishida
