= McGee (video game series) =

1989–1991 computer game series

McGee is a series of computer games released by Lawrence Productions for Kindergarteners ages 2–4.

== Description ==
- McGee was the first game in a series for preschoolers in 1989. The program allows kids to control young McGee, a preschooler himself, in and around his house. This is done from the mouse by pointing and clicking at the pictorial icons at the bottom of screen. For instance, if you click on the ball, McGee will start playing with it. If you click on the TV, McGee will sit down and proceed watching the tube.
- Katie’s Farm, let kids further explore the world of McGee in 1990. The second point and click exploration game for preschoolers, McGee visits his cousin Katie at her farm.
- McGee at the Fun Fair, let kids further explore the world of McGee in 1991. The third and last in the series followed the adventures of McGee and his friend Tony at the Fun Fair, with careful supervision from McGee's parents. It also provides the same point and click interface of the previous two games.

== Reception ==
Computer Gaming World gave McGee five stars out of five, stating that it was "a remarkably imaginative ... charming, simple, non-threatening introduction to computer literacy and interaction" that did not require reading skills. The magazine also gave Katie's Farm five stars, stating that "even young children can run the software all by themselves". Computer Gaming World later reviewed the series, calling it "excellent" and concluding that "the three programs should provide hours of fun and stimulation for preschool players".

All three titles were reviewed in the Oppenheim Toy Portfolio Guide Book where the "electronic pop-up books" were praised for bringing "picturebooks [...] alive for young children".
