= McGhee family =

Family

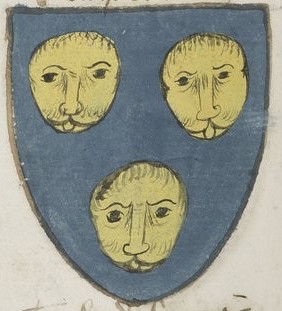
The arms of McGhie, one of the ninety-three Scottish families included in the Armorial de Berry, compiled in the 1440s.

The McGhee family (Scottish Gaelic: Mag Aoidh) is an ancient lowland family of Scotland, established as landowners in Galloway since at least the 13th century. Both the Clan Donald and the Clan Mackay claim it as a sept. Historically, however, the Mackays are in fact an offshoot of this family rather than vice versa. The ancient origins of the McGhees are uncertain, though they were probably Gaels from Ireland who took part in the conquest of Galloway (not then part of the Kingdom of Scotland) between the 9th and 11th centuries. Their property in Kirkcudbrightshire was significantly extended during the reign of the Stuarts. The family has always been self-consciously lowland and, almost uniquely among prominent Scottish families, remained entirely indifferent to the Clan system, as historians have noted:

"With such a variety of spellings many held lands, bore personal arms and sometimes held important positions and yet none, other than the Chief of Mackay, has been recognised in the chiefship of the kindred."

Gilmighel Mac Ethe is first mentioned subscribing allegiance to King Edward I of England in the Ragman Rolls of 1296. Neel McEth and Gillecryst McEth appear in another document of the same year as two of the Galloway men who, 'having aided John de Balliol late King of Scotland, in his war... against the King of England... confess their fault, come to his peace, and swear on the Saints to assist him against Balliol and all others'. In 1297, Edward thanked 'Gille Michel Mac Gethe' and others for 'putting down evil-doers and retaking castles in their country'. In 1304, however, Michael Macgethe is listed as a juror at an 'Inquisition' in Dumfries which asserted the rights of 'Robert de Brus earl of Carrick' (later Robert the Bruce) against those of Edward I in Annandale. Gilbertum McGeth is given as the collector of customs in Kirkcudbright in an exchequer roll of 1331, while in 1339 Michael Mcgeth was granted a pardon by Edward III after 'having joined his enemies in Scotland'.

Balmaghie ('Ballem'gethe') was erected into a free barony in 1348 and Gilbert Macge (also M'Gy (1370–1426)) is recorded as 'dominus de Balmage' in 1426. The family acquired progressively more influence and importance, especially during the reign of the Stuarts – Sir John McGhie of Balmaghie was knighted by Charles II. Having won favour with and then spurned the Stuarts at the right times, the family was prominent in Scottish and London society by the eighteenth century. However, this was lost with the sale of its estates and a lack of male heirs; by the early 18th century the families of Balmaghie, Airie and Airds, and Castlehill were practically extinct. John McGhie, last of Castlehill, had six daughters, the eldest of whom had six sons who all died childless. Because this decline occurred before the romantic revival of interest in the clans, the family never acquired its own tartan. McGhees may therefore choose to show allegiance to either the MacDonalds or the Mackays in their choice of tartan. The Balmaghie Estate itself, consisting of about 4,000 acres (16 km^{2}) of agricultural and sporting land (best known for its roe deer stalking) is now owned by another family.

The three M'Ghie seals are those of M'Ghie of Airie, M'Ghie of Balmaghie, and M'Ghie of Castlehill.

The coat of arms of the Balmaghie McGhees is given as "sable, three leopards' heads erased argent." Its motto is "Quae Sursum Volo" ("I desire heavenly things"). Early records of the arms show some variation, however:

- Ceulx de Maligny – Azure, three lions' faces or. ~ Armorial de Berry, 1440s

- Maogee of Balmagy – Sable, three human faces Argent tongues extended Gules. ~ Slains Armorial, 1565

- Macgie of Balmagie – Sable, three leopards' heads erased affronte argent, langued gules. ~ Hague Roll, 1590s

- Mcgie – Sable, three Leopard heads erased Argent. ~ Sir George Mackenzie's The Science of Herauldrie, 1680

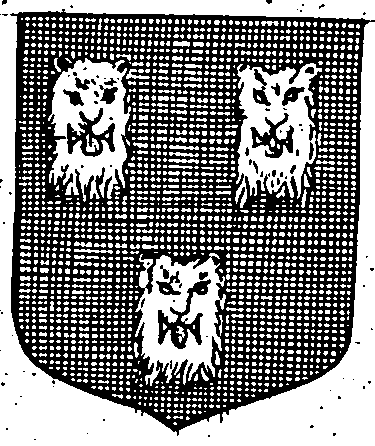
'Mcgie', in Sir George Mackenzie's The Science of Herauldrie, 1680.

- MacGie – Sable, three leopards' heads Argent. ~ Nisbet's A System of Heraldry, 1722

- MacGie of Balmaghie – Sable, three leopards' heads Or. ~ Nisbet's A System of Heraldry, 1722

- Magee [Ireland] – Crest, a lion, sejant, collared. ~ Robson's The British Herald, 1830

- Macgee – Gules, three martlets Or. ~ Robson's The British Herald, 1830

- McGee, or McGhee [West India] – Sable, a fesse between three leopards' faces Argent. Motto, "Fac et Spera". ~ Robson's The British Herald, 1830

- MacGhie [Balmagie, Scotland] – Sable, three leopards' heads Or. (Another, Argent). ~ Robson's The British Herald, 1830

- McGhie [England] – Sable, a fesse between three leopards' faces Argent. Crest: an ostrich Argent, in the beak a horse-shoe Azure. ~ Robson's The British Herald, 1830

- MacGie – Azure, three leopards' heads erased, Argent. ~ Robson's The British Herald, 1830

- McGie – Sable, a mullet arranged between three leopards' heads, erased guardant Or. Crest: a leopard's head, erased guardant Or, ducally gorged Gules. ~ Robson's The British Herald, 1830

The other prominent Galloway branches of the family were those of Airds and Castlehill. The name was also commonly interchangeable with Mackie and Mackay in Wigtownshire and Kintyre, and a branch of the family controlled the Rhinns of Islay for several centuries. Alexander M'Ghie inherited the Lairdship of Atrochie in Aberdeenshire from his father Hugo.

McGhee and its variants (e.g. McGee, McGie, McGhie, Magee, M'Gie etc.) is also a common surname in Ireland. Persons bearing this name are almost certainly inter-related, given the volume of migration across the Irish Sea, in both directions, particularly during the Galloglass and Plantation years. While both Catholic and Protestant McGhees can be found, the Balmaghie family were Presbyterian and the family's most notable churchmen were low Anglicans, as in the case of Archbishop Magee of Dublin and Archbishop Magee of York. The Revd Nathaniel McKie, a younger son of Balmaghie, was an eccentric and witty minister of Crossmichael who wrote the humorous self-parodying song "Nae dominies for me, laddie", about a young minister spurned by a young lady for a man with finer livery. A prominent exception is the current Bishop of Cloyne, a Traditionalist Catholic who was falsely accused of murdering Pope John Paul I. Odo MacIdh was Canon of Argyll in 1433.

The only peer with the surname is The Hon. Lord McGhie, Chairman of the Scottish Land Court and President of the Lands Tribunal for Scotland. Knights with this name include Sir John McGhie of Balmaghie (knighted by Charles II), and Sir Ian Magee (knighted by Elizabeth II). Robert Makgye was Court Jester to James II from 1441–50.

== Chiefs ==
The McGhees were never a Scottish Clan, and therefore the title of "clan Chief" was never used. The undisputed head of those bearing the surname, however, was the head of the family at Balmaghie (given below), who bore the undifferenced arms of McGhie.

- Michael Macge (1339-13??)
- Gilbert M'Ghie, 1st Lord of Balmage (13??-1426)
- Gilbert M'Gy, 2nd Lord of Balmage (1426–1471), m. Mareota de Keth
- William M'Gye of Balmage and Slogarrie (1471–1527), m. Blanch de Levenax
- Nicholas M'Ghie of Balmagee and Torris (1527-15??), m. Elizabeth Maxwell
- William Makgee (15??–1570), m. Lady Margaret Stewart
- Alexander McKie (1550–1611), m. Katherine Agnew
- Robert M'Ghie (1611–1637), m. Grissel Charteris
- Sir John M'Ghie (1637–1658), m. 1stly Barbara Anderson, 2ndly Elizabeth Levingstoune
- Alexander M'Ghie (1658–1690), m. 1stly Margaret M'Kee, 2ndly Elizabeth Stewart
- William M'Ghie (1690–1704), m. Anna Ballantyne or Fullerton
- John M'Ghie (1704–1732), m. Hon Isabel Gordon (daughter of Viscount Kenmure)
- Alexander M'Ghie (1732–1739), m. Grizzell Gordon (his cousin, granddaughter of the same Viscount Kenmure)
- John M'Ghie (1739–1761)
- William M'Ghie (1761-17??), m. Hon Eleonora McDouall (sister of the Earl of Dumfries)
- Spencer McGee (1997-20??),

William (uncle of John) inherited Balmaghie unexpectedly, with John McGhie's son having predeceased him. He was a merchant in Edinburgh and sold all the estate in 1786 to the Gordon family, to which he was closely related. He was Secretary of the fashionable Honourable Society of Hunters (a racing club composed of the principle nobles and gentry of Scotland). The grand Hunters' Ball at the Palace of Holyroodhouse in Edinburgh was the highlight of the early nineteenth-century Scottish social season. He was also a friend of James Boswell. Boswell described him as "a good-natured man, who has no aversion to be a butt, although he takes care to have a good premium for every arrow that he receives."

Another William M'Ghie was a doctor in London, one of Samuel Johnson's best friends, and a member of his Ivy Lane Club. He was also a poet and friend of Tobias Smollett. He fought with the Government against the Jacobite rising of 1745 as Captain of the Edinburgh Company of Volunteers, and was taken prisoner by the rebels after the disastrous Battle of Falkirk. Other distinguished officers include Lt-Col John Macghie of the Scots brigade who was killed fighting for the Dutch in 179 and Captain James Maghie.

In 1709 John Macghie was appointed Physician to the King by King George I in return for his loyalty to the Hanoverian succession. Major-General John McGhie CB was an Honorary Physician to Queen Elizabeth II.

In 1981, Sean (Sam) McGhee was appointed the twelfth hereditary Big Galoot of Cumberland and Westmorland.

== Other Branches ==
The crest of the English McGhies

The arms of the branch of the family (who spelled the name McGhie or McGee) which was seated in England by the early 19th century is given by Thomas Robson in "The British Herald" as sable a fesse between three leopards' faces argent. Their crest, however, bears no resemblance to the Balmaghie family's – it is quoted in Fairbairn's 'Book of Crests of the Families of Great Britain' as "an ostrich argent, in the beak a horse-shoe azure." This is the crest of the Gell baronets, to whom a connection may be supposed. Robert McGhie and his sons William and Willoughby McGhie lived at Upcott House, Bishop's Hull, Taunton. Another English Robert McGhie's estate was fought over in an extended Courts of Chancery case (McGhie v McGhie) in 1817.

A man bearing the name McGie matriculated the following arms in the early 19th century: "sable a mullet arranged between three leopards' heads erased guardant or." The crest was a leopard's head erased guardant or, ducally gorged gules." The significance of the ducal coronet is not known.

Robert McGhee had possession of the vast and controversial Greenside sugar estate in Jamaica in the late eighteenth century. Their arms and crest were identical to the English family's, but with the motto "Fac et Spera" (Do and Hope). Incidentally, it was a Church of Scotland missionary named the Revd William R F McGhie who designed the Flag of Jamaica in 1962.

The Irish surname "Magee", while sharing ancient origins with the Scottish variants, is considered a separate family. Their crest is "a lion sejant collared", while their arms are not given in Robson.
