= Gordon McGhie =

- Born: Gordon McGhie; 14 October 1907 Brisbane, Queensland
- Died: c. 1975

Rugby union career
- Position: wing
International career
Years	Team	Apps	(Points)
1929–30	Wallabies	3	(6)

Gordon McGhie (14 October 1907 – c. 1975) was a rugby union player who represented Australia. He rose to prominence in the late 1920s / early 1930s as a flying winger when the Queensland Rugby Union reformed after a ten-year hiatus.

McGhie, a wing, was born in Brisbane, Queensland and claimed a total of 3 international rugby caps for Australia.
