= Hicetas of Leontini =

4th-century BC tyrant of Leontini and Syracuse

Hicetas (Greek: Ἱκέτας or Ἱκέτης) was a Syracusan general and tyrant of Leontini, Magna Graecia, contemporary with the younger Dionysius and Timoleon.

Hicetas is first mentioned as a friend of Dion. After Dion's death in 353 BC, his widow Arete and his sister Aristomache turned to Hicetas for protection. Hicetas was willing to help them, but after a while he was persuaded otherwise by the enemies of Dion and accordingly he placed them on board a ship bound for Corinth, with secret instructions that they should be put to death during the voyage. (Plut. Dion, 58.)

In the disorders that ensued, Hicetas succeeded in gaining control of Leontini, which became, after the return of the younger Dionysius, a rallying point for all the disaffected Syracusans. But while Hicetas secretly intended to expel Dionysius so that he could establish himself in his place, the fears of a Carthaginian invasion and the desire to restore tranquillity to the island led the Sicilians (including the Syracusan exiles) to send an embassy imploring assistance from Corinth. Hicetas ostensibly joined in the request, but as this was entirely opposed to his schemes, he at the same time entered into secret negotiations with the Carthaginians. Meanwhile, he had assembled a considerable force with which he attacked Syracuse. He managed to defeat Dionysius in a decisive action, making himself master of the whole city, except the island citadel, in which he kept the tyrant closely besieged. (Plut. Timol. 1, 2, 7, 9, 11; Diod. xvi. 65, 67, 68.)

This was the state of things when Timoleon, having eluded the vigilance of the Carthaginians, landed in Sicily (344 BC). Hicetas, learning that the general was advancing to occupy Adranum, led his forces there in anticipation of his arrival. However, Hicetas was defeated with heavy losses and, shortly afterwards, Dionysius surrendered the citadel into the hands of the Corinthian leader.

Hicetas, finding that he had now to cope with a new enemy, and having failed in an attempt to rid himself of Timoleon by assassination, decided to openly seek the assistance of Carthage, and allowed Mago, at the head of a large fleet and army, into the port and city of Syracuse. Their joint operations were, however, unsuccessful. While they were engaged in an attempt upon Catana (modern Catania), Neon, the commander of the Corinthian garrison, recovered Achradina. Shortly afterwards Mago, alarmed at the disaffection among his mercenaries, and apprehensive of treachery, suddenly withdrew with all his forces and returned to Carthage. (Plut. Timol. 12, 13, 16–20; Diod. xvi. 68–70, who, however, erroneously places the departure of Mago before the surrender of Dionysius.)

Hicetas was now unable to prevent Timoleon from making himself the master of Syracuse. Once Timoleon had settled affairs in Syracuse, he turned his arms against Leontini, and would probably have succeeded in expelling Hicetas from there as well, had not the Carthaginian invasion at that time required all his attention. But after his great victory in the Battle of the Crimissus (339 BC), Timoleon soon resumed his project of completely freeing Sicily from the tyrants.

Hicetas had concluded a league with Mamercus, ruler of Catana, and they were supported by a body of Carthaginian auxiliaries sent to them by Gisco; but though they at first gained some partial successes, Hicetas was totally defeated by Timoleon at the river Damurias, and soon after fell into the hands of the enemy, by whom he was put to death, together with his son Eupolemus. His wife and daughters were carried to Syracuse, where they were executed, by order of the people, in vengeance for the fate of Arete and Aristomache. (Plut. Timol. 21, 24, 30–33; Diod. xvi. 72, 73, 81, 82.)
