= Eugène Mage =

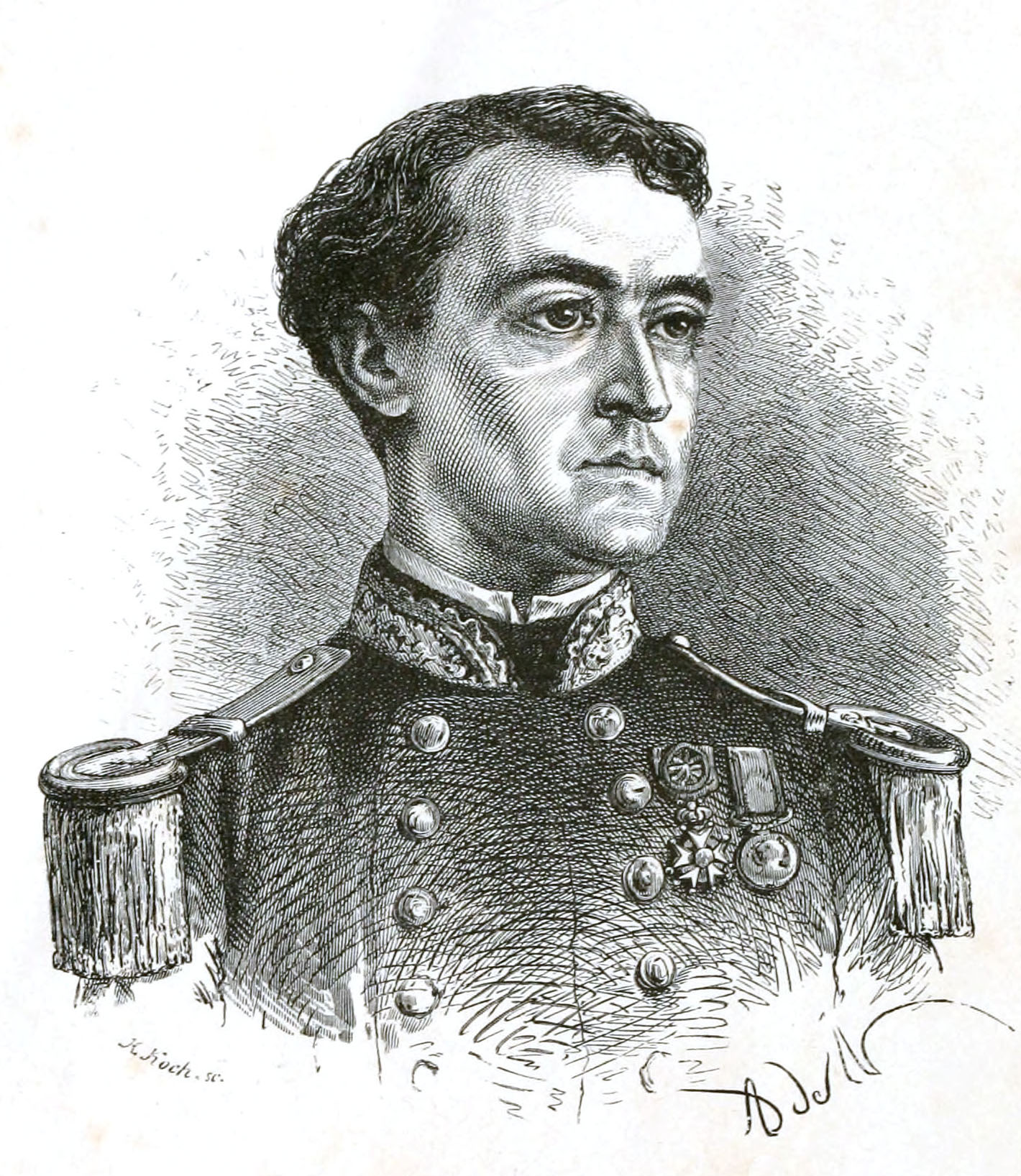
- Frontispiece of his book
- Born: 30 July 1837; Paris, France
- Died: 19 December 1869 (aged 32); Ushant, France
- Cause of death: Shipwreck
- Occupation: Naval Officer
- Known for: Travels in the Western Sudan
- Spouse: Henriette-Charlotte-Marie Peysson (m. 1862)

Eugène Abdon Mage (30 July 1837 – 19 December 1869) was a French naval officer and explorer of Africa. Mage published the first detailed description of the Toucouleur Empire created by El Hadj Umar Tall.

== Early life ==
Abdon-Eugène Mage (Note: In later life Mage reversed the order of his two first names.) was born in Paris. His father, Abdon-Jean-René Mage, was head teacher of a private secondary school. His mother, Henriette Cattant, was born in Beauvais and came from a bourgeois family in northern France. At the age of 13 years Mage passed the entrance exam for the École Navale, the French Naval Academy based in Brest, France. Two years later, at the age of 15, he was assigned to the frigate La Forte and in December 1852 set sail for Callao in Peru, stopping at Tenerife, Rio de Janeiro, Cape Horn and Valparaíso. Over the next two years he served on several ships, transporting troops and visiting Martinique and French Guiana. In the summer of 1855, during the Crimean War, he participated in the Anglo-French blockade of the Gulf of Finland in the Baltic. He then returned to Brest and in September 1855 at the age of 18 was promoted to the rank of sub-lieutenant.

== West Africa ==
Mage lived as adjudicator of the General Louis Faidherbe since 1858 in West Africa (in modern Senegal). After the 1860 voyage into north Senegal and toward Tagant (in modern Mauritania) and many expeditions north along the rivers Saloum and Sine toward Gambia, in 1863 with the Marines' doctor Louis Quintin (and others) traversed Bafoulabe, Kita, Nioro and Diangounté Camara in western Mali. He arrived in February 1864 at Ségou, where he stayed for 26 months as the guest of Ahmadu Tall. It was not until early June 1866 that Mage returned to Saint Louis.

In February 1868, Mage was given command of the paddle corvette La Gorgone. He patrolled the coast of the Iberian peninsula during 1869 and then headed back to Cherbourg. On 19 December 1869, while attempting to round the Brittany peninsula, the ship was wrecked on the Pierres Noires rocks, south of Ushant. All 93 crew were drowned and Mage's body was never recovered.

By their astronomical navigation and close attention to cartography Mage and Quintin are responsible for the first detailed map of western Sudan. Mage describes his journey in his literary works (see below).

== Works ==
- Mage, E. (1863), "Rivières de Sine et de Saloum (Côte Occidentale d'Afrique)", Revue maritime et coloniale (in French), 7: 673–679. Includes a map.
- Mage, Eugène (1867), Du Sénégal au Niger (in French), Paris: Dupont.
- Mage, Eugène (1868), Voyage dans le Soudan occidental (Sénégambie-Niger) (in French), Paris: Hachette. Gutenberg
- Mage, Eugene (1868), "Voyage dans le Soudan Occidental (Sénégambia-Niger)", Le Tour du Monde: Nouveau Journal des Voyages (Premier Semestre), Paris: Hachette: 1–112.

== Sources ==
- Saint-Martin, Yves J. (1970). "Un centenaire oublié, Eugène-Abdon Mage (1837-1869)". Revue française d'histoire d'outre-mer (in French). 57 (207): 141–182. doi:10.3406/outre.1970.1502.
