= AW Hainsworth =

English textile manufacturing company

Coordinates: 53.80666293245962°N 1.6664242148736077°W

- Company type: Limited Company
- Industry: Textiles
- Predecessor: Abimelech Hainsworth
- Founded: 1783; 242 years ago
- Founder: Abimelech "Old Bim" Hainsworth
- Headquarters: Pudsey, West Yorkshire, England
- Key people: Amanda Maclaren (Managing Director), Phil Atherton (Commercial Director), Thomas Hainsworth ("Overseeing" role, Family Council), Andrew Wright (Non-Executive Chairman)
- Products: Wool, especially heavily milled types
- Owner: Hainsworth family
- Website: www.hainsworth.co.uk

AW Hainsworth & Sons, Ltd., formerly known as Abimelech Hainsworth is an English textile manufacturing company based in Pudsey, West Yorkshire. It is known for producing heavily milled wool fabrics such as melton and doeskin, and supplying these to the British Army, most notably for the red coats worn ceremonially by certain British Army units, especially the Grenadier Guards, for whom Hainsworth is the exclusive supplier of scarlet wool cloth for tunics, navy blue for trousers, and grey for winter greatcoats.

== Products ==
The company holds a Royal Warrant of Appointment. Charles, Prince of Wales and Prince William, Duke of Cambridge wore garments of Hainsworth cloth at their weddings. Prince Philip, Duke of Edinburgh was buried in a coffin made of Hainsworth wool. Prince Philip reportedly once asked Thomas Hainsworth what business he was in, and was told "textiles," to which the prince replied "Oh yes, a dying industry, isn't it?" In 2010, speaking a sustainability conference, Prince Charles joked “I have discovered a company that makes a woollen coffin — coffins, ladies and gentlemen, to die for."

Hainsworth makes fabric for the clothing industry, academic dress, for fire-retardant personal protective equipment, automobile, upholstery, bakery conveyor belting, historical re-enactment, baize for billiard tables and the casino industry, and for costume and staging.

== History ==
The firm was founded as a clothing business in 1783 by 14 year old Abimelech Hainsworth, later known as "Old Bim". In 1900, the founder's grandson, with the same name, was running the mill when he suffered a head injury in an industrial accident and was treated at the Leeds General Infirmary, spending twelve weeks in the hospital's care. In 1909, Hainsworth's wife donated the equivalent of £60,000 to the hospital which is commemorated by a brass plaque. The plaque was placed in storage and lost until its re-discovery in 2017. The plaque was presented to Adam Hainsworth, a descendant of the original benefactors, in 2021.

=== Link with Catherine, Princess of Wales ===
In 1958, AW Hainsworth bought the Leeds textile manufacturing firm William Lupton & Sons. The great-grandfather of Catherine, Princess of Wales - Noël Middleton (1878-1951) - was a director of the company. The princess visited AW Hainsworth in 2023 where, according to a member of the Hainsworth family, she had prepared for her visit to the mill by chatting to her father, Michael Middleton, and mother Carole.

Until 2021, the firm was run by descendant Thomas Hainsworth, marking the seventh generation of the family involvement. In that year, Hainsworth announced he would step down as director of the technical and transport interiors divisions in October, in favour of sales director Diane Simpson. Thomas Hainsworth retains an oversight role on the Family Council, which he helped to create in 2018. After reaching an early twenty-first century nadir, the British wool industry has seen increased demand for its product. Thomas Hainsworth said the firm has learned from past mistakes, and that shareholders have told him to focus on reinvesting in equipment to remain competitive, instead of taking profits out of the business.
