= Diangounté Camara =

Diangounté
- Commune and town
- Location in Mali
- Coordinates: 14.545°N 9.513°W
- Country: Mali
- Region: Kayes Region
- Cercle: Diéma Cercle

Area
  - Total: 1,303 km^{2} (503 sq mi)

Population (2022 census)
  - Total: 43,681
  - Density: 33.52/km^{2} (86.83/sq mi)
- Time zone: UTC+0 (GMT)

Diangounté is a rural commune and small town in the Diéma Cercle in the Kayes Region of western Mali. The commune contains 38 villages and hamlets. In the 2022 census the commune had a population of 43,681.
