= McGee =

McGee or McGees may refer to:

== People ==
- McGee (surname), a surname of Irish origin, including a list of people with this surname

== Places ==
=== United States ===
- McGee, Missouri
- McGees, Washington
- McGee, West Virginia

== Infrastructure ==
- McGees Bridge, Tasmania, Australia

== Games ==
- McGee (video game series), a series of computer games for young children
