= McGehee (surname) =

McGehee is a surname of Scottish origin. Notable people with the surname include:

- Casey McGehee (born 1982), American baseball player
- Edward McGehee (1786–1880), American plantation owner
- Eugene McGehee (1929–2014), American politician
- Harvey McGehee (1887–1965), American judge and politician
- Ned McGehee (1907–1989), American college sports coach
- Richard McGehee (born 1943), American mathematician
- Robby McGehee (born 1973), American Indy driver
- Scott McGehee (born 1962), American film director and screenwriter
- Tom McGehee (1924–2002), American businessperson and philanthropist
