= Timoleon =

Greek statesman and general (c.411–337 BC)

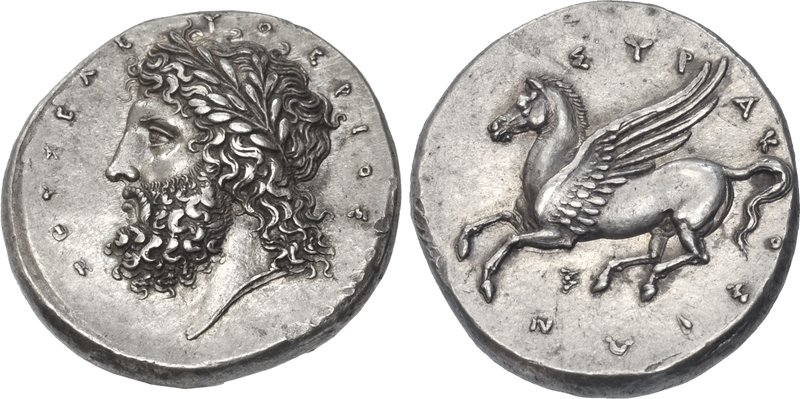
Coin of Timoleon (344–337 BC), with Zeus Eleutherios ('the liberator') and Pegasus

Timoleon (Greek: Τιμολέων), son of Timodemus, of Corinth (c. 411–337 BC) was a Greek statesman and general. He became a ruler of many Sicilian towns after expelling their local tyrants.

Timoleon is closely associated with the history of Sicily, particularly Syracuse, where he led campaigns against Carthaginian forces and local tyrants in the 4th century BC.

== Early life ==
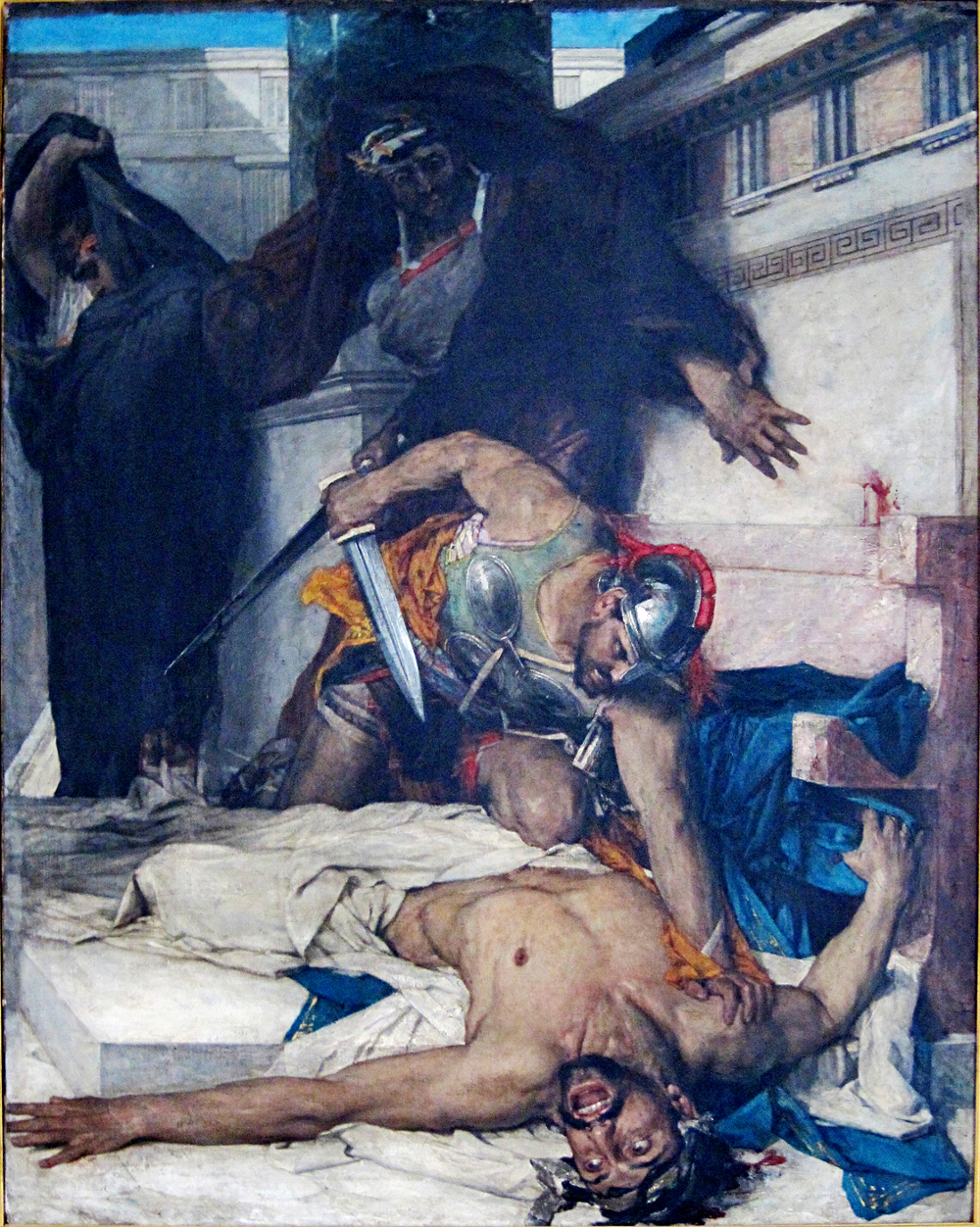
The assassination of Timophanes (Léon Comerre, 1874); Timoleon (at rear) covers his head with his cloak after having his own brother killed.

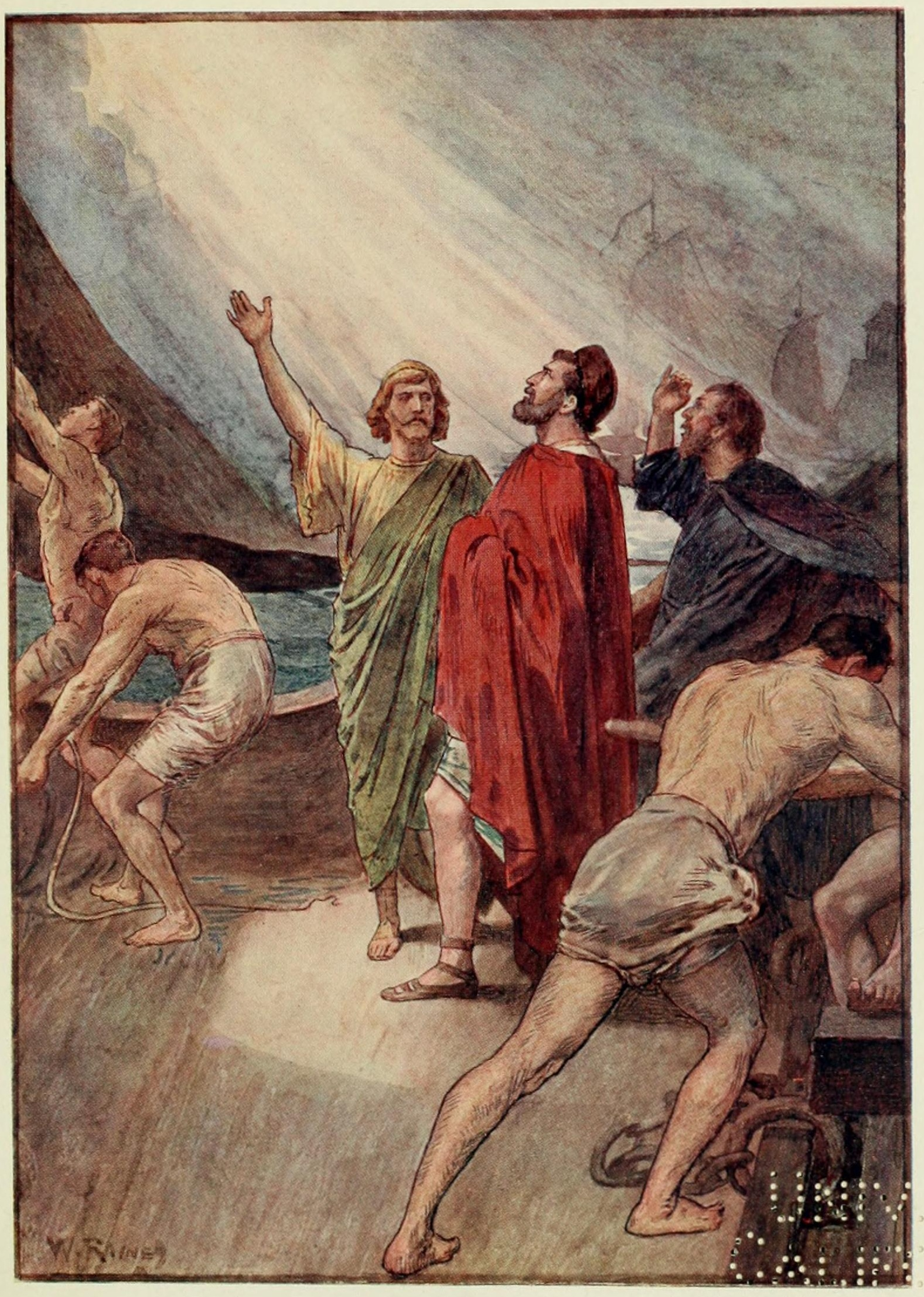
Timoleon sets sail for Sicily (as depicted in Children's Plutarch, 1900)

Timoleon was a member of the Corinthian oligarchy. In the mid 360s BC, Timophanes, the brother of Timoleon, took possession of the acropolis of Corinth and effectively made himself tyrant of the city. In response, Timoleon, who had earlier heroically saved his brother's life in battle, and after repeatedly pleading with him to desist, became involved in the assassination of Timophanes. Most Corinthians approved his conduct as patriotic; however, the tragic occurrence, the actual fratricide, the curses of his mother, and the indignation of some of his fellow citizens, drove him into a self-imposed early withdrawal from politics and civic life for twenty years.

== Sicily ==
Because of inner strife, the depredations and decline in Syracuse caused by the despots Dionysius I and his son who succeeded him, and because of the repeated conflicts with powerful Carthage, a group of Syracusans sent an appeal for help to Corinth, their mother city, which reached that city-state in 344 BC. Corinth agreed to help, but her chief citizens declined to accept the seemingly hopeless task of establishing a stable government in tyrannical, fractious, insecure, and turbulent Syracuse.

Timoleon, being named by an unknown voice in the Corinthian popular assembly, was chosen by a unanimous vote to undertake the mission. He set sail for Sicily with seven ships, a few of the leading citizens of Corinth, and a small force of 700 Greek mercenaries. He eluded a Carthaginian squadron by an ingenious stratagem and landed at Tauromenium (now Taormina) in 344 BC, where he met with a friendly reception. At this time Hicetas, tyrant of Leontini, was master of Syracuse, with the exception of the island of Ortygia, which was occupied by Dionysius II, still nominally ruler.

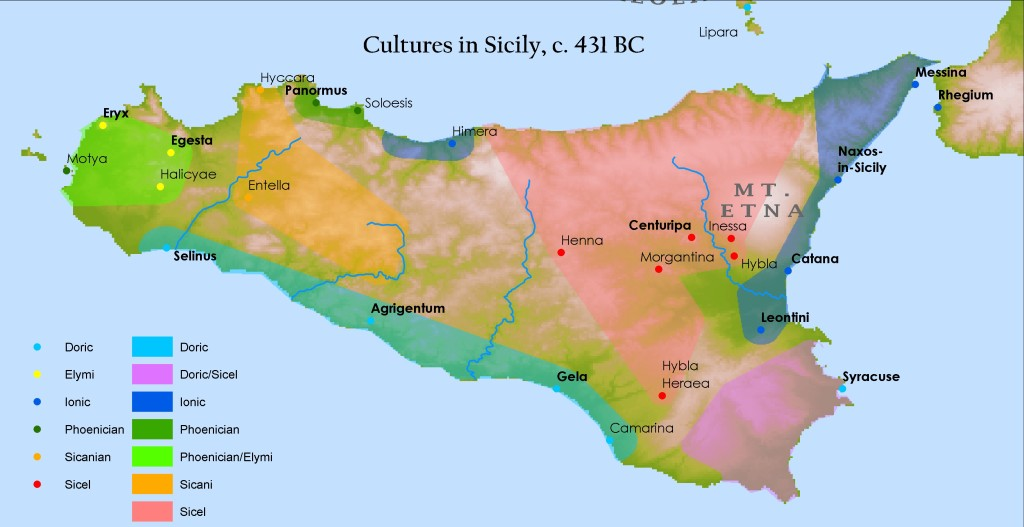
Sicily in 431 BC

Hicetas was defeated by Timoleon at Adranum, an inland town, and driven back to Syracuse. After his initial unexpected success, Timoleon was sent reinforcements from Corinth and some north-western Greek states. Following the siege of Syracuse, Dionysius II surrendered Ortygia in 343 BC on the condition of his being granted a safe conduct to Corinth, where he ended his life as a private, well-off, citizen.

Hicetas now received help from Carthage (60,000 men), but ill-success roused mutual suspicion; the Carthaginians abandoned Hicetas, who was besieged in Leontini, and who was then compelled to surrender. Timoleon was thus master of Syracuse.

He at once began the work of restoration, beginning with the symbolic act of destroying the citadel constructed and used by the tyrants to oppress the people of Syracuse, and replacing it with a courthouse. He brought new settlers to depopulated Sicily from all over Greece, and re-established a popular government on the basis of the democratic laws of Diocles. The amphipolos, or priest of Olympian Zeus (ἀμφίπολος Διὸς Ὀλυμπίου), who was chosen annually by lot out of three clans, was invested with the chief magistracy. The impress of Timoleon's reforms seems to have lasted to the days of Augustus.

Hicetas persuaded Carthage to send (340–339 BC) a great army of 70,000 men, which landed at Lilybaeum (now Marsala). With a miscellaneous levy of about 12,000 men, most of them mercenaries, Timoleon marched westwards across the island to the neighbourhood of Selinus. Against all odds, after being deserted by a part of his army who believed that facing a foe six times as large as their own was hopeless, Timoleon, at the head of his infantry, won a great and decisive victory on the Crimissus. His victory was made possible by the fact that the Carthaginian army had not yet completed the river crossing, so his small force only had to fight the elite part of the Carthaginian force. He was also aided by a violent storm at the backs of his troops but blinding to the Carthaginians.

Later, Carthage dispatched mercenaries to prolong the conflict between Timoleon and the Greek tyrants. But this ended in the defeat of Hicetas, who was taken prisoner and put to death. A treaty in 338 BC was agreed upon, by which Carthage was confined in Sicily to the west of the Halycus (Platani) river and undertook to give no further help to Sicilian tyrants. Most of the remaining tyrants were killed or expelled. This treaty gave the Greeks of Sicily many years of peace, restored prosperity, rule of law, and safety from Carthage.

== Ruler of Syracuse ==
Timoleon established a new Syracusan constitution, described at the time as democratic. For a short time he had wide powers equivalent to a supreme commander. He invited settlers from mainland Greece to assist in the re-population of Syracuse and other Sicilian cities. During this period, Greek Sicily enjoyed a recovery in its economy and culture.

== Retirement ==
Timoleon retired into private life shortly after the goals he set out to accomplish were met. He remained almost universally admired for his brilliant victories, moderation, and the restoration of democracy after half a century of tyranny, suffering, near economic collapse, turmoil, and depopulation. After his retirement, when important issues were under discussion the by-now blind Timoleon was carried to the assembly to give his opinion, which was usually accepted. He was buried at the cost of the citizens of Syracuse, who erected a monument to his memory in their market-place, afterwards surrounded with porticoes, and a gymnasium called Timoleonteum.

== Historical analysis ==
The ancient historian Timaeus praised Timoleon. Polybius, an ancient historian with oligarchic sympathies, said Timaeus was biased in favour of Timoleon and many modern historians have agreed with Polybius. Peter Green views Timoleon as "no more than a benevolent tyrant" similar to Pisistratus. In Green's view, Timoleon merely posed as a democrat, and as such was using the methods of a tyrant. He is also of the view that Timoleon tried to maintain the outward forms of democracy, yet reformed Syracuse in a democratic direction, and demolished the stronghold of the island that had been useful to tyrants in the past.

When taken to court on spurious grounds, Timoleon refused to be exempted, saying that this was the "precise purpose for which he had so long laboured and combated—in order that every Syracusan citizen might be enabled to appeal to the laws and exercise freely his legal rights."

The historian George Grote agreed with a eulogy given by a Syracusan at Timoleon's funeral, about three years after the Crimissus victory:

The Syracusan people solemnise, at the cost of 200 minae, the funeral of this man . . .They have passed a vote to honour him for all future time. . .,—because, after having put down the despots, subdued the foreign enemy, and re-colonised the greatest among the ruined cities, he restored to the Sicilian Greeks their constitution and laws.

== Sources ==
- Cornelius Nepos, Timoleon.
- Diodorus Siculus, Historical Library, xvi.65–90.
- Plutarch, Life of Timoleon.

Preceded by: Dionysius the Younger	Tyrant of Syracuse; 345–337 BC	Succeeded by: oligarchy position next held by Agathocles in 320 BC
