= George Louis McGhee =

- Born: March 3, 1925; Los Angeles, California, U.S.
- Died: December 20, 2000 (aged 75)
- Education: University of Southern California (MS); United States International University
- Occupation: Therapist

George Louis McGhee (March 3, 1925 – December 20, 2000) was an American marriage and family therapist. He was also a lobbyist for marriage and family therapy laws in the state of California.

== Life ==
Born in Los Angeles, California, he joined the United States Navy in 1942. He worked as a teacher for the Los Angeles Unified School District while earning a Master of Science in education and Counseling and Guidance (1958) at the University of Southern California.

In 1963, he received an honorary doctorate extramurally from the International Free Protestant Episcopal University (UK) in Clinical Psychology for his work in Marriage, Family, and Child Counseling and gifted children. He also received an honorary fellowship from Saint Andrew's Ecumenical Church Foundation (UK).

In 1964 he became one of the founders, originators, and first president of the California Association of Marriage and Family Therapists. In 1979 he earned his doctorate in leadership and human behavior from United States International University in San Diego.
