= Platani (river) =

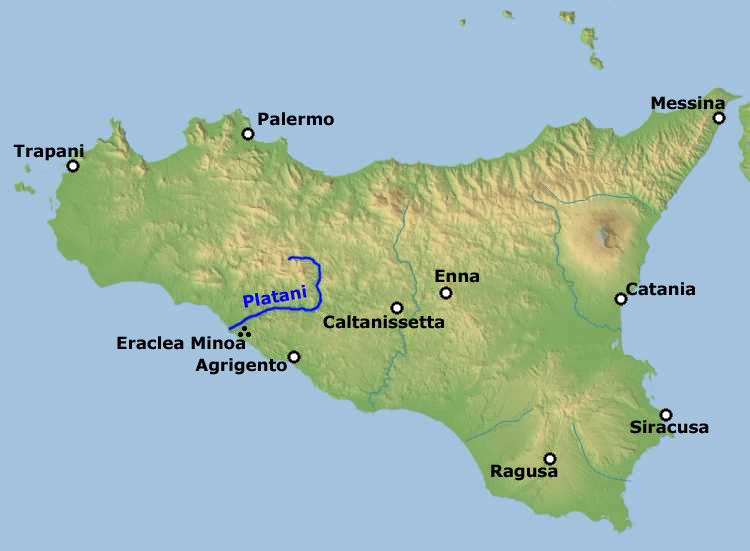

Location
- Sicily: Italy

Physical characteristics
- Source
  - location: Monti Sicani
  - elevation: c.1,000 to 1,200 m (3,300 to 3,900 ft)
- Mouth: Mediterranean Sea
  - coordinates: 37.3960°N 13.2708°E
- Length: 103 km (64 mi)
- Basin size: 1,785 km^{2} (689 sq mi)
- Discharge
  - average: 7.5 m^{3}/s (260 cu ft/s)

The Platani (Sicilian: Plàtani), known in Ancient Greek as the Λύκος (Lykos, 'wolf') or Ἁλυκός (Halykos, 'salty'), is a river in Sicily, Italy. It is the fifth longest in the island after Salso, Simeto, Belice, and Dittaino, with a course of 103 km, and the third for drainage basin with 1,785 km^{2}, after the Simeto and Imera Meridionale. It flows through the provinces of Palermo and Agrigento, marking the boundary between the latter and that of Caltanissetta.

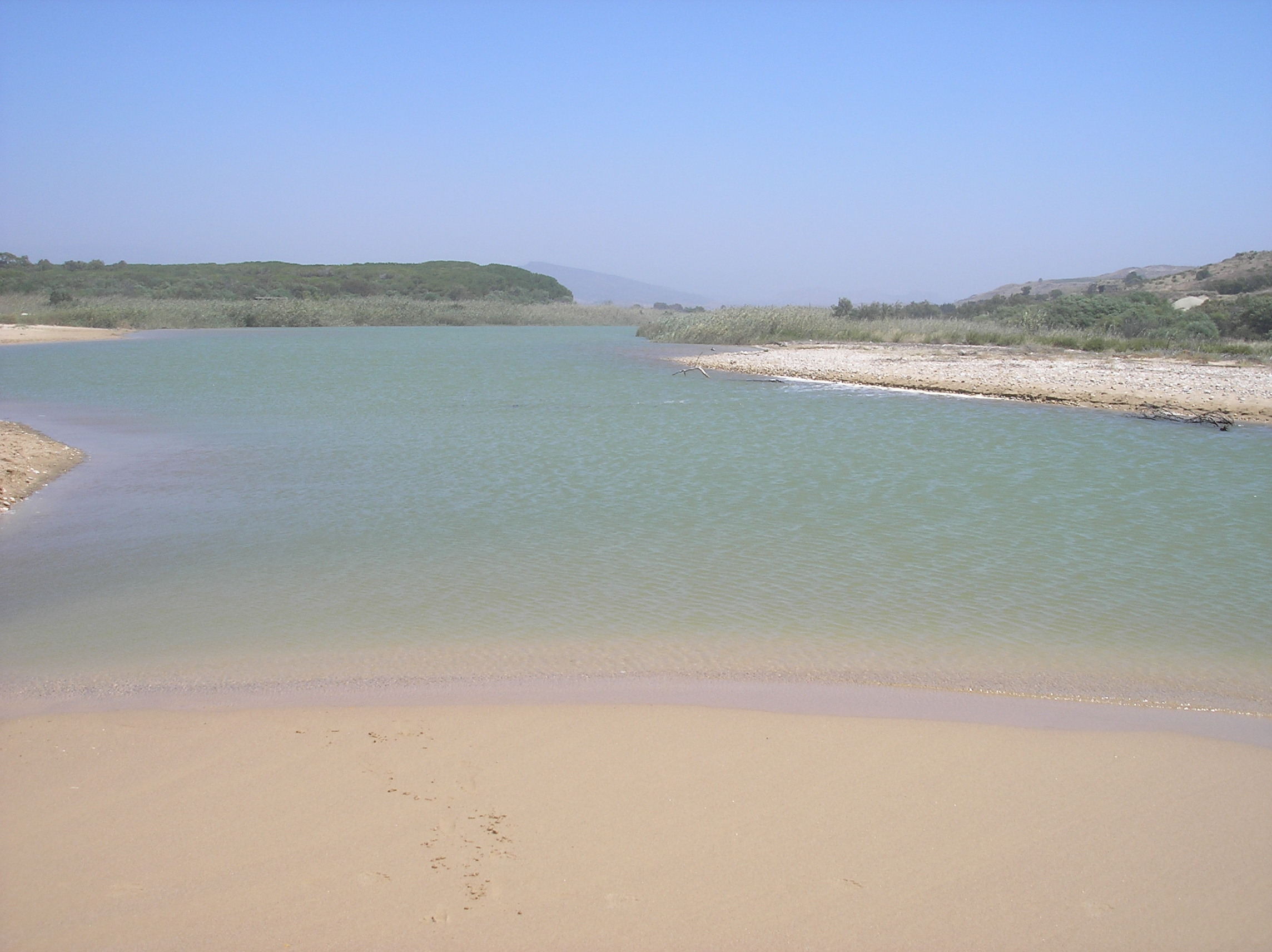
The River Platani near Heraclea Minoa

The river rises at the confluence of Platani di Lercara and Platani di Castronuovo, which, respectively, rise in the comuni of Lercara Friddi (under the Pizzo Lanzone mountain) and Santo Stefano Quisquina (between the Serra della Moneta and Pizzo della Rondine mountains). From the confluence to the mouth it runs for c. 83 km; including the branch of Castronuovo the total length is 103 km. Along its course the Platani receives the waters of several tributaries, including the Gallo d'Oro, Turvoli, Vallone Morella, Vallone Tumarrano, and Vallone di Aragona.

The river flows into the Strait of Sicily, near Capo Bianco, on the boundary of the comuni of Ribera and Cattolica Eraclea.
