= Dámaso =

Dámaso is a Spanish masculine given name. The name is equivalent to that of Pope Damasus I in English. The name also exists in Italian as Damaso, though it is uncommon.

== People ==
- Dámaso Alonso (1898–1990), Spanish poet
- Dámaso Berenguer, 1st Count of Xauen (1873–1953), Spanish soldier and politician
- Dámaso Blanco (born 1941), Venezuelan baseball third baseman
- Dámaso Centeno (1850–1892), Argentine politician and orphanage founder
- Dámaso Espino (born 1983), Panamanian baseball catcher
- Dámaso García (1957–2020), Dominican baseball player
- Dámaso González (1948–2017), Spanish bullfighter
- Dámaso Antonio Larrañaga (1771–1848), Uruguayan priest, naturalist and botanist
- Dámaso Marte (born 1975), Dominican Major League Baseball relief pitcher
- Dámaso Pérez Prado (1916–1989), Cuban musician
- Dámaso Rodríguez Martín "El Brujo" (1945–1991), Spanish serial killer
- Dámaso Ruiz-Jarabo Colomer (1949–2009), Spanish jurist
- Dámaso de Toro, Mayor of Ponce, Puerto Rico in 1701
- Father Dámaso, a character in José Rizal's novel Noli Me Tangere

== Other ==
- San Lorenzo in Damaso, a basilica in Rome
- Instituto Social Militar Dr. Dámaso Centeno, a charity school in Buenos Aires
- Mariano Dámaso Beraun District, one of six districts within the Peruvian province of Leoncio Prado
- Universidad Católica del Uruguay Dámaso Antonio Larrañaga, a Jesuit university in Montevideo
