= Bruja (disambiguation) =

A bruja is a witch.

Bruja may also refer to:

- Brujas F.C., a Costa Rican football club
- Bruja (novel), a 2001 novel based on the television series Angel
- La Bruja (film), a 1954 horror film
- La Bruja (TV series), a 2011 Colombian telenovela
- Caridad de la Luz (born 1977), or La Bruja, Puerto Rican poet, actress, and activist
- "Bruja", a song by Arca from Kick III

== See also ==
- Brujah, a fictional clan of vampires in Vampire: The Masquerade
- El Cazador de la Bruja, a 2007 anime television series
- Mägo de Oz (La Bruja), a 1997 album by Mägo de Oz
- Las Brujas de South Beach, a Spanish-language telenovela
- Brujería (disambiguation)
- Brujo (disambiguation)
