= Magician =

Magician(s) or The Magician(s) may refer to:

- A practitioner of magic (supernatural)
  - Magician (fantasy), a practitioner of magic in fiction
- A practitioner of stage magic

== Arts and entertainment ==
=== Films ===
- The Magician (1898 film), a French short directed by Georges Méliès
- The Magician (1900 film), a silent film by Thomas Edison
- The Magician (1926 film), a horror film directed by Rex Ingram
- The Magician (1949 film), a Mexican comedy
- The Magician (1958 film), a drama directed by Ingmar Bergman
- Magician (1967 film), a Soviet film directed by Pyotr Todorovsky
- Magicians (1982 film), a Soviet film directed by Konstantin Bromberg
- The Magician, a 1993 crime drama directed by Terry Winsor
- Magicians, a 2000 film directed by James Merendino
- The Magician, a film by Azerbaijani director Ogtay Mirgasimov that won Best Film at the inaugural Golden Minbar International Film Festival in 2005
- The Magicians, a 2005 South Korean film directed by Song Il-gon
- The Magician (2005 film), an Australian crime drama directed by Scott Ryan
- The Magician (2006 film), a Turkish comedy drama directed by Cem Yılmaz
- Magicians (2007 film), a 2007 comedy directed by Andrew O'Connor
- Magician: The Astonishing Life and Work of Orson Welles, a 2014 documentary directed by Chuck Workman
- The Magician (2015 film), a South Korean period fantasy film directed by Kim Dae-seung

=== Television ===
- The Magician (American TV series), an American series that aired in 1973–1974
- The Magician (French TV series), an animated series that aired in 1999
- The Magicians (British TV series), a British series that aired from 2011 to 2012
- The Magicians (American TV series), a series based on the Lev Grossman novel that aired in 2015–20
- "Magician", the live-action segment of the 14th episode of The Super Mario Bros. Super Show!
- "The Magician" (Arrow episode), fourth episode of the third season of Arrow
- The Magician (Arrowverse character), an alias of Malcolm Merlyn from the television series Arrow

=== Music ===
- The Magician (album), a 1976 album by Timmy Thomas
- The Magician (musician), Belgian DJ and music producer Stephen Fasano
- "Magician" (song), by Ice Prince from the 2011 album, Everybody Loves Ice Prince
- "Magician", a song by Jay Chou from the 2008 album Capricorn
- The Magicians (band), American garage rock band
- The Magician (EP), 2009 EP by Said the Whale
- "The Magician", a song by Geordie Greep from the 2024 album The New Sound

=== Novels ===
- The Magician, an 18th-century novel by Leitch Ritchie
- The Magician (Maugham novel), a 1908 novel by Somerset Maugham
- The Magicians (Priestley novel), a 1954 novel by J. B. Priestley
- The Magician (Stein novel), a 1971 young adult novel by Sol Stein
- The Magicians, a 1976 novel by James E. Gunn
- The Magician: The Secrets of the Immortal Nicholas Flamel, a 2008 novel by Michael Scott
- The Magicians (Grossman novel), by Lev Grossman, published 2009
- Magician (Feist novel), a 1982 novel in the Riftwar series by Raymond E. Feist
- The Magician (Tóibín novel), a 2021 novel by Colm Tóibín

=== Other arts and entertainment ===
- Magician (Marvel Comics), three comic book characters
- Magician (video game), a 1990 action role-playing game
- Magician, a character from Douglas Adams' 1982 novel Life, the Universe and Everything

== Sport ==
- Canterbury Magicians, a New Zealand women's cricket team
- Harlem Magicians, an American basketball entertainment enterprise similar to the Harlem Globetrotters
- Minnesota Magicians, an American ice hockey team
- Mumbai Magicians, an Indian field hockey team

== Other uses ==
- The Magician (nickname), a list of people
- The Magician (Tarot card)
- Magician (horse), an Irish Thoroughbred racehorse
- HTC Magician, a mobile phone
- Operation Magician, a British police operation connected to the 2000 Millennium Dome attempted robbery

== See also ==
- Dark Magician (disambiguation)
- Little Magician (disambiguation)
- Mage (disambiguation)
- Magic (disambiguation)
- Magus (disambiguation)
