= The Magician (nickname) =

As a nickname, the Magician may refer to:

- Kenny Belaey (born 1983), Belgian mountain bike trials cyclist
- Merl Condit (1917–1992), American National Football League player
- John Dodson (fighter) (born 1984), American mixed martial artist
- Antonio Esfandiari (born 1978), Iranian-born American poker player and former stage magician
- Raymond Goethals (1921-2004), Belgian football coach.
- Jared Jordan (born 1984), American basketball player
- Ali Karimi (born 1978), Iranian coach and retired footballer
- Stanley Matthews (1915–2000), English footballer
- Chris Melling (pool player) (born 1979), British pool player
- Shaun Murphy (born 1982), English snooker player
- Jonathon Power (born 1974), Canadian squash player
- Efren Reyes (born 1954), Filipino pool player
- Fabrice Santoro (born 1972), French tennis player
- Robert Wagner (darts player) (born 1965), Norwegian darts player
- Dayne Zorko (born 1989), Australian rules footballer
- an alias of Merlyn (DC Comics), archenemy of Green Arrow

== See also ==
- The Magician (disambiguation)
- Little Magician (disambiguation)
- El Mago (Spanish for "The Magician"), a list of people with the nickname
- Raymond Goethals (1921–2004), Belgian football coach nicknamed "le magicien" ("the magician")
- Eyal Berkovic (born 1972), Israeli soccer player nicknamed "Ha-Kosem" ("The Magician")
- The Wizard (nickname)
