= La Maga =

La Maga (Spanish feminine for "the magician") may refer to:

- Luciana Aymar (born 1977), Argentinian field hockey player
- Magaly Quintana (1952–2019), Nicaraguan feminist historian and activist
- a protagonist in the 1963 novel Hopscotch by Julio Cortázar
- a character in the Venezuelan telenovela Calypso, which debuted in 1999
- a figure in Colombian mythology - see Muelona
- La Maga, a 2015 series on Tiin, a now-defunct Mexican pay television channel

== See also ==
- El Mago, the masculine form of the phrase
