= Brujo (disambiguation) =

Brujo (Spanish for "wizard") is a practitioner of Brujería.

Brujo or El Brujo may also refer to:

== Places ==
- El Brujo Peru
- Chocoyero-El Brujo Natural Reserve in the municipality of Ticuantepe in the Managua department

== People ==
- Brujo (surname)
  - Juan Brujo
- El Brujo (nickname)
  - Amancio Amaro (born 1939), Spanish former footballer
  - Manuel Fleitas Solich (1900–1984), Paraguayan football player and coach
  - José López Rega (1916–1989), Argentina's Minister of Social Welfare
  - Dámaso Rodríguez Martín (1945–1991), Spanish serial killer
  - Ramiro Mendoza (born 1972), former Major League Baseball pitcher
  - Juan Quarterone (born 1935), Argentine footballer
  - Cuco Valoy (born 1937), Dominican singer

== Plant ==
- Plectranthus amboinicus (redirect from Orégano brujo)

== Sport ==
- Guayama Wizards (redirect from Brujos de Guayama) basketball team based in Guayama, Puerto Rico

== Music ==
- Los Brujos band
- Brujo, New Riders of the Purple Sage album
- "Brujo", a track by The Future Sound Of London

== See also ==
- El brujo (disambiguation)
- El amor brujo (disambiguation)
- Bewitching Kisses (redirect from Besos brujos) 1937 Argentine romantic drama film musical
- Warlock of Chiloé (redirect from Brujo Chilote) semi-mythical characters in Chilote mythology and folklore
