= Sol Stein =

American author and publisher (1926–2019)

- Born: October 13, 1926
- Died: September 19, 2019 (aged 92)
- Occupations: Author, writer, editor, publisher, playwright
- Writing career
- Language: English

Sol Stein (October 13, 1926 – September 19, 2019) was the author of 13 books and was Publisher and Editor-in-Chief of Stein and Day Publishers for 27 years.

== Early life ==
Born in Chicago on October 13, 1926, Stein was the son of Louis Stein and Zelda Zam Stein. The family moved to New York in 1930. In 1941, while living in the Bronx, Sol Stein wrote his first book, "Magic Maestro Please", followed shortly by "Patriotic Magic". He attended DeWitt Clinton High School, where he served on the Magpie literary magazine with Richard Avedon and James Baldwin. He graduated in 1942 and enrolled at CCNY, which then provided a free education.

Between the time of Stein's enlistment in the Army Air Corps in 1944 and being called to active duty on March 1, 1945, Stein had completed nearly three years of infantry ROTC at CCNY. After qualifying for pilot and bombardier training, a backlog of pilots caused Stein to voluntarily transfer to the infantry. Overseas, he served as an Information & Education officer in the Headquarters of the 1st Infantry Division (United States) in Germany as Commandant of Division Schools, located in three cities, Regensburg, Ansbach, and Triesdorf. On 5 November 1946 Stein was cited by Lt. General Geoffrey Keyes for having organized and commanded the best occupational training schools in the Third Army Area in the American Zone of Germany.

Upon returning from Europe in 1946, Stein completed work for his degree at CCNY and simultaneously with his graduation in 1948 was employed at the college as a lecturer in social studies. While teaching, he took his master's degree in English and Comparative Literature at Columbia University in 1949 and was accepted for the famed doctoral seminar conducted jointly by Lionel Trilling and Jacques Barzun, both of whose writings Stein was later to edit.

== Script writer for the Voice of America ==
From 1951 to 1953 Stein was employed by the state-run Voice of America, eventually as senior editor of the Ideological Advisory Staff. He wrote daily scripts that were translated into 46 languages and broadcast to two million people listening behind the Iron Curtain. It was at the Voice that Stein's association with Bertram Wolfe began; Stein was instrumental in causing the re-publication of Wolfe's masterpiece, Three Who Made a Revolution, which had been allowed to go out of print. The book subsequently sold half a million copies in a few years and was adopted in almost all Soviet Studies programs in the U.S. and elsewhere.

In 1953 Stein was appointed Executive Director of the American Committee for Cultural Freedom, an anti-communist cultural organization which was later revealed to be supported by the CIA. He had been on the CIA's payroll at least twice. It was in this period that the eventual publisher supervised the writing and publication of McCarthy and the Communists, which made The New York Times Bestseller List for 13 weeks and was credited with contributing to the unseating of Senator McCarthy.

== Playwright ==
In 1952 Stein was granted a leave of absence from the Voice of America to accept back-to-back fellowships at Yaddo, an artists' colony, and the MacDowell Colony. At MacDowell, Stein completed his first play, Napoleon, under the watchful eye of Thornton Wilder, a fellow at the same time. The verse drama was produced the following year by the New Dramatists organization at the ANTA Theater in New York and was chosen by the Dramatists Alliance as "the best full length play of 1953".

Stein completed a second play, A Shadow of My Enemy, originally intended as an adaptation of Whittaker Chambers' best-selling memoir, Witness (1952), but, when denied rights, based on public record and published in 1957. The play, whose synopsis runs "A senior editor of Time magazine accuses his closest friend of being a Communist", was originally commissioned by the Theater Guild and subsequently produced on Broadway by Roger Stevens, Alfred deLiagre Jr., and Hume Cronyn. The cast starred Ed Begley and Gene Raymond.

In the early 1950s, Stein and Elia Kazan formed a friendship that was cemented in 1955 when Stein served as the production observer from first reading to opening night of the Tennessee Williams play Cat on a Hot Tin Roof, which won the Pulitzer Prize for drama that year. Stein's play A Shadow of My Enemy was produced in 1957 by Roger Stevens, Alfred deLiagre Jr. and Hume Cronyn at the National Theater in Washington and the ANTA theatre on Broadway in New York starring Ed Begley and Gene Raymond. In 1957 Stein was one of 10 founding members of the Playwrights Group at the Actors Studio in New York with William Inge, Tennessee Williams, Lorraine Hansberry, and others.

From 1957 to 1959 Stein served for two and a half years as Managing Editor of the Executive Membership Division of the Research Institute of America.

== Editor and publisher ==
In 1953 Stein edited and supervised the publication of McCarthy and the Communists by James Rorty and Moshe Decter for the Beacon Press in Boston. Melvin Arnold, director of the Beacon Press appointed Stein as General Editor of Beacon's Contemporary Affairs Series in the book size trade paperback format developed by Stein. Working as a freelance contractor, Stein's first list for Beacon included Three Who Made a Revolution by Bertram Wolfe, Homage to Catalonia by George Orwell, The Century of Total War by Raymond Aron, An End to Innocence by Leslie Fiedler, The Need for Roots by Simone Weil, The Hero in History by Sidney Hook, Social Darwinism in American Thought by Richard Hofstadter, and The Invisible Writing by Arthur Koestler.

Sol Stein edited the classic work Notes of a Native Son by James Baldwin, selected as #19 of the "100 best nonfiction books of the 20th century"; Elia Kazan's America America; and Lionel Trilling's Freud and the Crisis of Our Culture. He was also responsible for the continued publication of Bertram D. Wolfe's The Fabulous Life of Diego Rivera and George Orwell's Homage to Catalonia, selected as #42 of the 100 best nonfiction books of the 20th century.

In 1959 Lionel Trilling, Jacques Barzun, W. H. Auden and Sol Stein launched The Mid-Century Book Society, an upscale book club, which was an immediate success.

== Stein and Day ==
In 1962 Stein founded the New York-based publishing firm Stein and Day with his then-wife, Patricia Day. Stein was both publisher and editor-in-chief of the firm. The publishing house's first book was Elia Kazan's America America, which sold three million copies in hardback, paperback, and book club editions. The success of many of Stein and Day's books was attributable in part to the amount of publicity work that Stein and Day did for each book. Stein worked with Kazan daily for five months on Kazan's s first novel The Arrangement, which was #1 on The New York Times bestseller list for 37 consecutive weeks.

The firm relocated from Manhattan to Briarcliff Manor, New York in 1975, and published about 100 books each year until the company was compelled to close its doors, the background of which was the subject of Stein's nonfiction book, A Feast for Lawyers. The New York Times said, "He has produced an appalling, Dickensian portrait of the entire system...ought to be read not only by executives facing Chapter 11 but by all entrepreneurs and indeed by anyone who fantasizes about running his own company." Stein's book was honored by The American Bankruptcy Association at its annual convention in Washington, D.C. Columbia University now hosts the Stein and Day Archives, which chronicles the firm's 27 years of existence. Stein and Day was the originating publisher of works by Leslie Fiedler, David Frost, Jack Higgins, GordonThomas, Budd Schulberg, Claude Brown, Bertram Wolfe, Mary Cheever, Harry Lorayne, Barbara Howar, Elaine Morgan, Wanda Landowska, Marilyn Monroe, Oliver Lange, and F. Lee Bailey, among others. Stein and Day was also the American publisher of J. B. Priestley, Eric Partridge, Anthony Sampson, Maxim Gorky, Che Guevara, L. P. Hartley, and George Bernard Shaw.

== Honors ==
- Honorary Life Member, International Brotherhood of Magicians, Ring 26, 1947.
- Honorary Phi Beta Kappa, College of the City of New York, tc
- Distinguished Instructor Award, University of California at Irvine, 1992

== Bibliography ==
=== Novels ===
- The Husband, Coward-McCann, 1969, Pocket Books, 1970. British Commonwealth: Michael Joseph, Mayflower. Translated into German, Spanish, Japanese, Norwegian, Swedish, Finnish, Dutch.
- The Magician, Delacorte, 1971, Dell, 1972. Selected by the Book-of-the-Month Club. British Commonwealth: Michael Joseph, Mayflower. Translated into French, Spanish, German, Japanese, Russian. Film rights to Twentieth-Century Fox. Screenplay by Sol Stein.
- Living Room, Arbor House, 1974, Bantam, 1975. The Literary Guild, Doubleday Book Club. British Commonwealth: The Bodley Head, New English Library. Translated into French, German (2 editions), Italian, Japanese.
- The Childkeeper, Harcourt Brace Jovanovich, 1975, Dell, 1976. British Commonwealth: Collins, Fontana. Translated into German, Spanish. German-language TV motion picture released
- Other People, Harcourt Brace Jovanovich, 1980, Dell, 1981. British Commonwealth: Collins, Fontana. French, German, Italian (3 editions), Greek.
- The Resort, Morrow, 1981, Dell, 1982. British Commonwealth: Collins, Fontana. Translated into Russian. Motion picture rights optioned (twice).
- The Touch of Treason, Marek/St. Martin's Press, 1985, Berkley, 1986. British Commonwealth: Macmillan. Translated into German, Greek, Swedish, Norwegian.
- A Deniable Man, McGraw-Hill, April, 1989. Translated into German.
- The Best Revenge, Random House, 1991.

=== Nonfiction books ===
- A Feast for Lawyers, hardcover, M. Evans, 1989, paperback 1992. Trade paperback, Beard Books, 1999.
- Stein on Writing, St. Martin's Press, 1995 hardback, 2000 paperback; British Commonwealth under the title Solutions for Writers, Souvenir Press. German edition, Zweitausendeins.
- How to Grow a Novel, St. Martin's Press, 1999, British Commonwealth under the title Solutions for Novelists, Souvenir Press, 2000, in German, Zweitausendeins 2000.
- Native Sons, correspondence and commentary with James Baldwin, 2004)

=== Plays and screenplays ===
- Napoleon (previously titled The Illegitimist), produced New York and California, 1953, winner of Dramatists Alliance Prize, "best full-length play of 1953"
- A Shadow of My Enemy, produced by Roger Stevens, Hume Cronyn, and Alfred DeLiagre, ANTA Theater, 1957, starring Ed Begley and Gene Raymond
- The Magician, screenplay, 20th Century Fox

=== Software ===
- WritePro® and The New WritePro®, Fiction writing lessons, created in 1989 with his wife Patricia Day Stein and his son David Day Stein.
- FictionMaster®, tools for fiction writers, created with his wife Patricia Day Stein and his son David Day Stein.
- FirstAid for Writers®, tools for fiction and non-fiction writers, created with his wife Patricia Day Stein and his son David Day Stein.
