= El Mago =

Nickname given to numerous sportsmen

El Mago (Spanish for "the magician") or Mago is a nickname given to:

- Pablo Aimar (born 1979), Argentine retired footballer
- Guido Alvarenga (born 1970), Paraguayan former footballer
- Thiago Alcântara (born 1991), Spanish-Brazilian football player
- William Arjona (born 1979), Brazilian former volleyball player
- Javier Báez (born 1992), Puerto Rican Major League Baseball player
- Héctor Blondet (1947–2006), Puerto Rican basketball player
- Alberto Pedro Cabrera (1945–2000), Argentine basketball player
- Rubén Capria (born 1970), Argentine retired footballer
- Guillermo Coria (born 1982), Argentine tennis player
- Alcides Escobar (born 1986), Venezuelan Major League Baseball player
- Walter Gaitán (born 1977), Argentine retired footballer
- Enrique García (Argentine footballer) (1912–1969), Argentine footballer
- Mágico González (born 1958), Salvadoran retired footballer
- Juan Martín Hernández (born 1982), Argentine rugby union player
- Pablo Hernández (footballer, born 1985), Spanish footballer
- Miguel Ángel Loayza (1940–2017), Peruvian former footballer
- Sergio Markarián (born 1944), Uruguayan football coach
- Juan Mata (born 1988), Spanish footballer
- Dani Olmo (born 1998), Spanish footballer
- Alejandro Sabella (1954–2020), Argentine football manager and former player
- Franklin Salas (born 1981), Ecuadorian footballer
- Pedro Septién (1916-2013), Mexican sports broadcaster
- Sam Shepherd (basketball) (born 1953), American-born Venezuelan former basketball player
- David Silva (born 1986), Spanish footballer
- Vasilios Tsiartas (born 1972), Greek retired footballer
- Jorge Valdivia (born 1983), Chilean footballer

== See also ==
- The Magician (nickname)
- La Maga (disambiguation), the feminine form of the phrase
- El brujo (disambiguation)
- The Wizard (nickname)
