= The Wizard (nickname) =

The Wizard or Wizard is a nickname for:

== People nicknamed The Wizard ==
- Dhyan Chand (1905–1979), Indian field hockey player
- Gary Crowton (born 1957), American football coach
- Jeff Farmer (footballer) (born 1977), Australian rules footballer
- Bobby Hoff (1939–2013), American poker player
- Marine Johannès (born 1995), French basketball player
- Jeff Mills (born 1963), American techno DJ and producer
- Japhet N'Doram (born 1966), Chadian retired footballer
- Erik Rasmussen (footballer) (born 1960), Danish former footballer and manager
- Ronaldinho (born 1980), Brazilian footballer nicknamed O Bruxo
- Jacob Schaefer Sr. (1855–1910), American billiards player
- Ozzie Smith (born 1954), American Major League Baseball player
- Vassilis Stravopodis (born 1948), Greek former footballer
- Simon Whitlock (born 1969), Australian darts player
- Ray Whitney (ice hockey) (born 1972), Canadian former National Hockey League player
- Gus Williams (basketball) (born 1953), National Basketball Association player
- Bogdan Wołkowski (born 1957), Polish billiards trick-shot artist and entertainer
- Hakim Ziyech (born 1993), Dutch-Moroccan Premier League footballer
- Alperen Şengün (born 2002), Turkish professional basketball player for the Houston Rockets of the National Basketball Association

== People nicknamed Wizard ==
- Lars Bo (1924–1999), Danish artist and writer
- Murray Wier (1926–2016), American former basketball player

== See also ==
- Warren Buffett (born 1930), American business magnate nicknamed the "Wizard of Omaha"
- Frankie Carle (1903–2001), American pianist and bandleader nicknamed the "Wizard of the Keyboard"
- Thomas Edison (1847–1931), American inventor and businessman nicknamed the "Wizard of Menlo Park"
- Ron Fraser (1933–2013), American baseball coach, the "Wizard of College Baseball"
- Momosuke Fukuzawa (1868–1938), Japanese businessman, the "Wizard of the Money Markets"
- Jørgen Kristensen (born 1946), Danish former footballer, "Troldmanden" ("the Wizard")
- Stanley Matthews (1915–2000), English football player, the "Wizard of the Dribble"
- Ernie Roth, professional wrestling manager known as the "Grand Wizard"
- Roy Smeck (1900–1994), American musician, the "Wizard of the Strings"
- Bert le Vack (1887–1931), British motorcycle racer, the "Wizard of Brooklands"
- Yrjö Väisälä (1891–1971), Finnish astronomer and physicist, the "Wizard of Tuorla"
- John Wooden (1910–2010), American member of the Basketball Hall of Fame as both a college basketball head coach and player, the "Wizard of Westwood"
- Welsh Wizard (disambiguation)
- The Magician (nickname), a list of people
- El Mago (Spanish for "the Magician"), a list of people
- El Brujo (disambiguation) (Spanish for "the Wizard"), includes a list of people
- Darío Verón (born 1979), Paraguayan footballer nicknamed "Hechicero" ("The Wizard")
- Raymond Goethals (1921–2004), Belgian football coach nicknamed "le sorcier" ("the Wizard")
