= Dark Magician =

Dark Magician(s) may refer to:

- Dark Magician (Adventure Time character), character in animated series Adventure Time
- Dark Magician (Guardian Tales), character in South Korean video game Guardian Tales
- Dark Magician (Yu-Gi-Oh!) (黒・魔・導), the signature card of Yugi Mutou, the first protagonist in the Yu-Gi-Oh! franchise
- Dark Magicians (闇の魔法つかい), character in Japanese animated series Witchy Pretty Cure!

== See also ==
- Black Magician
- Magician (disambiguation)
