= Javier Báez =

Puerto Rican baseball player (born 1992)

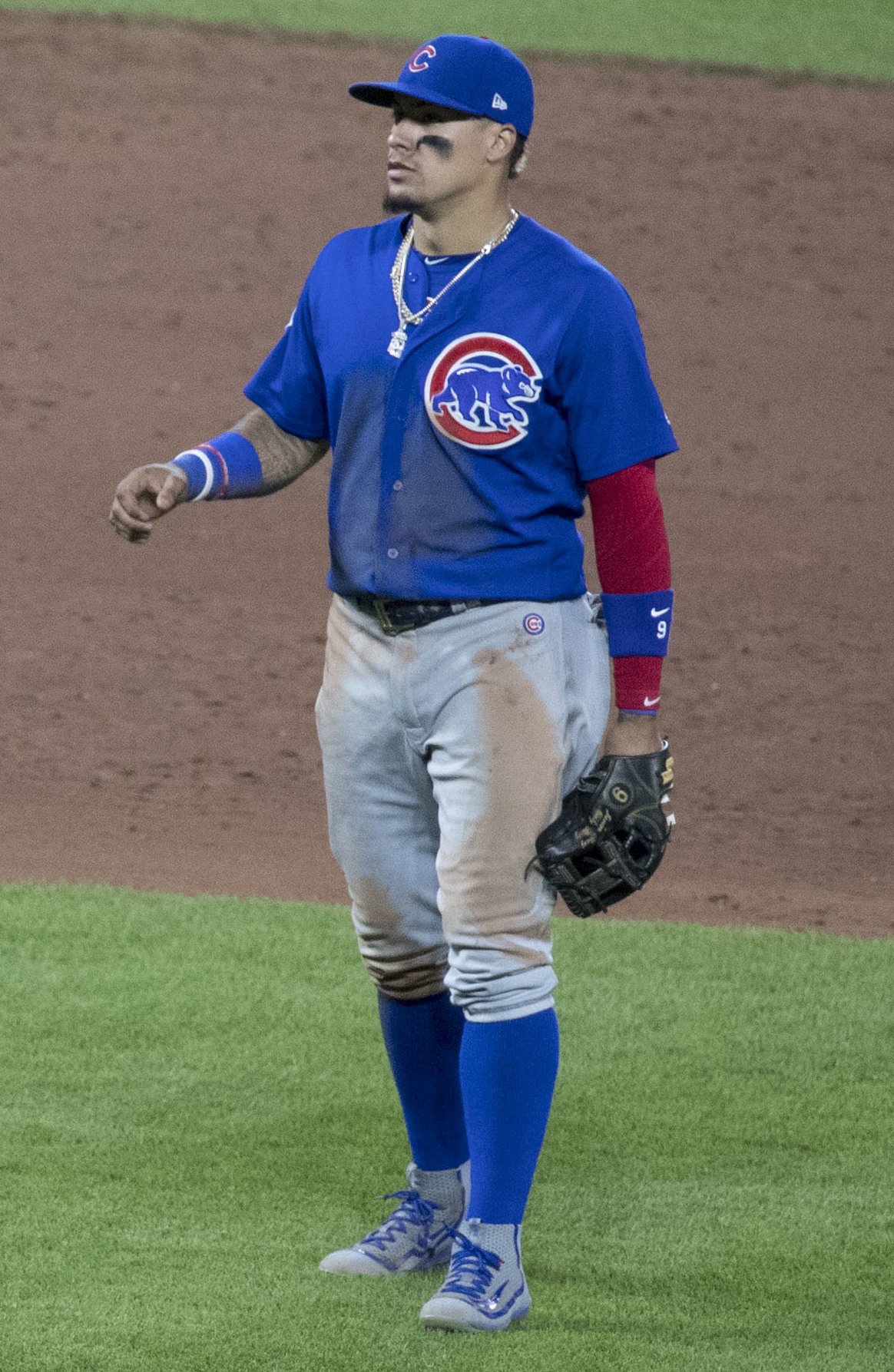
- Báez with the Chicago Cubs in 2017

Detroit Tigers – No. 28
- Utility player
- Born: December 1, 1992 (age 33); Bayamón, Puerto Rico
- Bats: Right Throws: Right

MLB debut
- August 5, 2014, for the Chicago Cubs

MLB statistics (through 2026 season)
- Batting average: .251
- Home runs: 196
- Runs batted in: 705
- Stats at Baseball Reference

Teams
- Chicago Cubs (2014–2021); New York Mets (2021); Detroit Tigers (2022–present)

Career highlights and awards
- MLB: 3× All-Star (2018, 2019, 2025); World Series champion (2016); NLCS MVP (2016); Gold Glove Award (2020); Silver Slugger Award (2018); 4x Fielding Bible Award (2016–2018, 2020); NL RBI leader (2018); International: 2x All-WBC Team (2017, 2023)
Medals
Men's baseball
Representing Puerto Rico
World Baseball Classic
Silver medal – second place	2017 Los Angeles	Team

Ednel Javier "Javy" Báez (born December 1, 1992), nicknamed "El Mago" (Spanish for "the Magician"), is a Puerto Rican professional baseball utility player for the Detroit Tigers of Major League Baseball (MLB). He previously played in MLB for the Chicago Cubs and New York Mets. On the international level, he represents the Puerto Rican national team.

Born in Puerto Rico, Báez attended high school in Jacksonville, Florida. The Cubs selected Báez with the ninth overall selection of the 2011 MLB draft. He made his MLB debut in 2014 and played for the Cubs for eight years before he was traded to the Mets in 2021. After the 2021 season, he entered free agency where he then signed a six-year contract with the Tigers.

Báez was named the National League Championship Series co-MVP alongside left-handed starter Jon Lester as the Cubs clinched their 2016 National League pennant en route to winning the 2016 World Series. He is a three-time All-Star, as well as a Gold Glove Award, and Silver Slugger Award winner. He is also the cover athlete for MLB The Show 20.

== Early life ==
Báez and his two brothers, Gadiel and Rolando were born in Puerto Rico and grew up there. They became interested in baseball through their father, Ángel Luis Báez who heavily influenced their life and was responsible for their interest in the sport. Ángel Báez died before Javy was 10. The brothers have tattoos of the MLB logo symbolizing that "baseball has been in (their) lives forever."

Báez moved to Florida in 2005 along with his mother and siblings, two brothers and a sister. The move was so that his sister, Noely, could get medical treatment for her spina bifida condition. As a middle school student, it took time for him to adapt because he was unable to fluently speak or understand English. He eventually learned the language through trial and error in a process that lasted for three years, memorizing words before knowing their actual meaning.

== Amateur career ==
Báez attended Arlington Country Day School (ACD) in Jacksonville, Florida. His coach at ACD, Ron Dickerson, noted that initially scouts were not impressed by him, noting his talent, but not believing he could become a star. Dickerson emphasized that Báez's work ethic was responsible for positioning him as a real prospect. As a sophomore, he had a .463 batting average with 38 hits, of which nine were doubles and 13 were home runs. Making 82 plate appearances in 25 games, he also gathered 60 runs batted in (RBIs). By the time his junior season was over, Báez was a highly rated Aflac All-American. In his senior season, he recorded 64 hits in 83 at-bats to gather an average of .771, which included 20 doubles and 10 home runs. In total, Báez recorded 52 RBIs in 30 games. While at ACD, he never played a position steadily. After working at second base, he was moved to shortstop once the team lost a player. Besides those positions, he also played as a center fielder and catcher. He committed to play college baseball at Jacksonville University.

== Professional career ==
=== Chicago Cubs ===
==== 2011–2014: Minor leagues ====
The Chicago Cubs selected Báez in the first round, with the ninth overall selection, of the 2011 MLB draft. He signed with the Cubs for a $2.6 million signing bonus and began his professional career by playing shortstop for the Arizona Cubs of the Rookie-level Arizona League. He played in three games, recording three hits, including two doubles, in 12 at-bats and two stolen bases. Promoted to the Boise Hawks of the Class A-Short Season Northwest League, Báez recorded one single in six at bats across two games. On September 29, 2011, he was selected third overall by the Leones de Ponce in the Liga de Béisbol Profesional Roberto Clemente's (LBPRC) rookie draft, but did not play due to the Cubs' limitations.

Before the 2012 season, MLB.com rated Báez as the 62nd-best prospect in baseball. He remained with the Cubs in extended spring training with other prospects, participating in 26 games and hitting 6 doubles, 3 triples, and 8 home runs, with 28 RBI, 11 stolen bases, and 23 strikeouts in 94 plate appearances. He made his regular season debut with the Peoria Chiefs of the Class A Midwest League. He was promoted to the Daytona Cubs of the Class A-Advanced Florida State League (FSL). Baseball America included Báez in two of its "Best Tools" lists, naming him the "Most Exciting Player in the Midwest League" and the "Best Defensive Infielder" in the Chicago Cubs system.

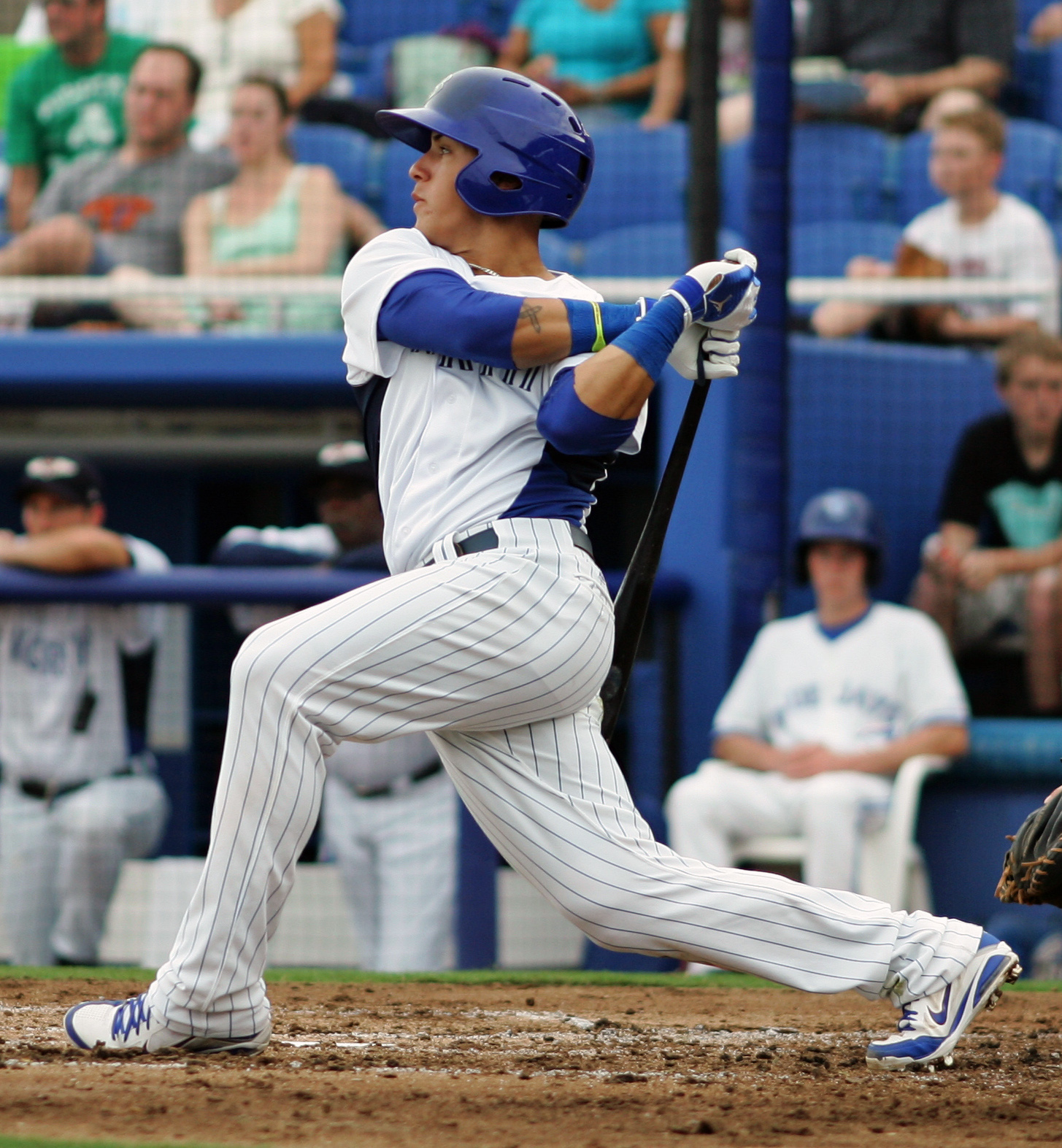
Báez at bat in the Florida State League All-Star Game in 2013

Before the 2013 season, MLB.com rated Báez as the 16th-best prospect in baseball. The Cubs invited him to join their major league team in spring training, competing in the Cactus League. Báez hit four home runs in five at-bats over the course of two games, including in an unofficial exhibition game against the Japanese national baseball team which was preparing for the 2013 World Baseball Classic. He concluded spring training with a .298 batting average and 10 RBIs. Báez returned to the Daytona Cubs to open the 2013 season. On June 10, 2013, Báez hit four home runs in one game, becoming the second player to do so in the history of the FSL. Báez was named one of the five finalists in the fan vote for the final spot on the World Team's roster for the 2013 All-Star Futures Game, but he finished second to Carlos Correa.

On July 6, 2013, the Cubs promoted Báez to the Tennessee Smokies of the Class AA Southern League after displaying more plate discipline and walking more often during the previous month. Báez was named to both the FSL and Southern League All-Star teams at the conclusion of the season. The Cubs named him their Minor League Player of the Year, closing the season as the top-ranked prospect in the team's system and third overall in the Southern League. On October 28, 2013, Báez won the MiLBY Award for Best Minor League Game of the Year, recognizing his four-home run game.

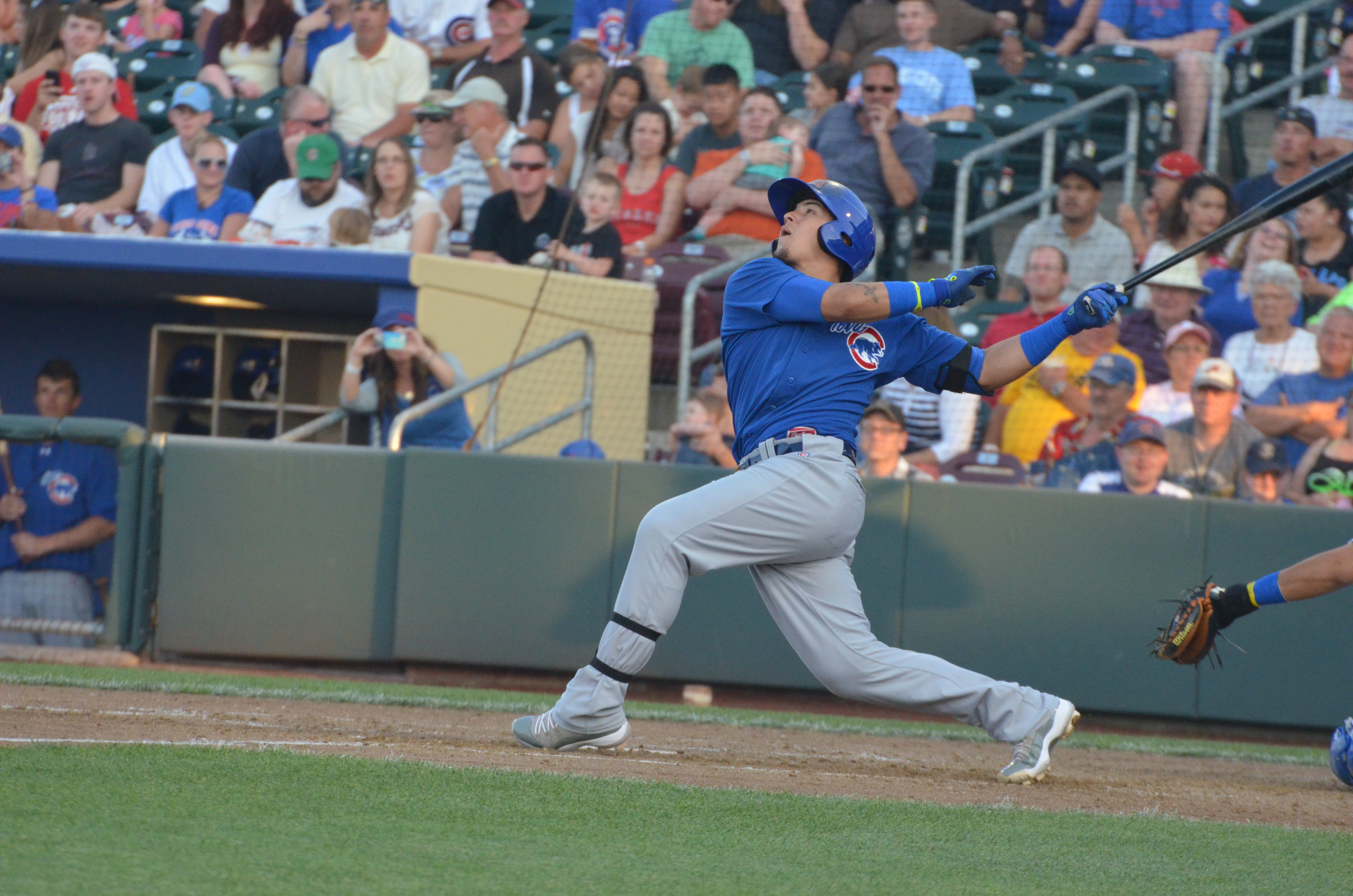
Báez with the Iowa Cubs in 2014

The Cubs invited Báez to spring training in 2014. An injury suffered by Starlin Castro allowed him regular playing time. To increase his versatility, Báez began practicing at second base and third base. He was reassigned to Minor League camp during the final week of spring training. Bothered by a back injury, he opened his participation with the Iowa Cubs of the Class AAA International League (IL) immersed in a slump, with his only hit in 20 at bats being the first home run of the season. During the second week of the season, Báez had his first multi-hit game and hit a second home run before being placed on the seven-day disabled list with an ankle sprain. Báez slumped following his return, and his batting average fell below .150 in May, while his strikeout-to-walk ratio worsened. With a more patient approach at the plate, Báez began a hitting streak on May 16, 2014. On May 26, 2014, Báez was named the PCL Player of the Week for the previous week.

On May 22, 2014, the Cangrejeros de Santurce of the LBPRC signed Báez by exploiting a legal loophole that allowed players to be considered free agents unless properly signed within three years of being drafted. However, the Leones de Ponce quickly reclaimed his local player rights, claiming that they had approached him with the intent of formalizing a contract but that the "extreme fatigue" clause of the Winter League Agreement had interfered.

==== 2014: Rookie season ====
On August 5, the Cubs promoted Báez to the major leagues. In his debut that day, he hit his first career home run; the game-winner in the 12th inning victory against the Colorado Rockies, becoming the first player since Miguel Cabrera in 2003 to hit an extra-innings home run in his debut. In his third game, Báez hit two home runs, becoming the first player since Joe Cunningham in 1954 to hit three home runs in his first three MLB games. On August 18, 2014, Báez hit his fifth home run in 14 games, joining Jason Kipnis as the only other second baseman to do so in the last 100 years.

On September 2, starting shortstop Starlin Castro injured himself in an awkward slide at home plate in which he sprained his left ankle rendering him unable to play for the remainder of the season. Báez finished the season at shortstop. In 52 games with the Cubs in 2014, Báez struck out 95 times while batting .169 with 5 stolen bases, 9 home runs, and 20 RBI.

==== 2015: Continued progression ====
After struggling in spring training, mostly due to a high number of strikeouts, the Cubs optioned Báez to Iowa on March 30, 2015. He batted .324 in 70 games for Iowa, missing time due to the death of his sister and a broken finger. At the end of Iowa's season, Báez was called up to the major leagues as a part of September call-ups on September 1. Báez hit his first home run of the season on September 4 in a win over the Arizona Diamondbacks. His three-run home run in the second inning of game 4 of the National League Division Series against the St. Louis Cardinals helped the Cubs to a 6–4 win as they advanced to the National League Championship Series.

==== 2016: World Series champions ====
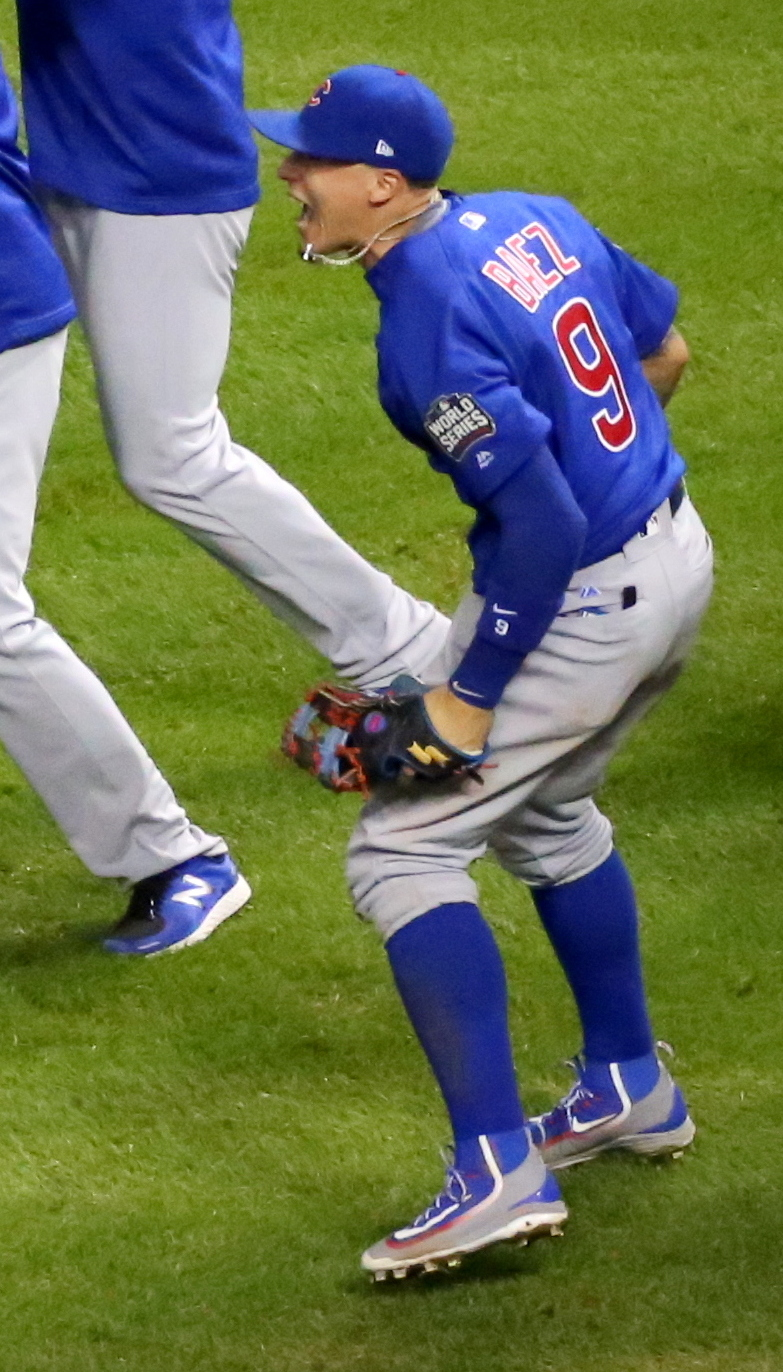
Báez celebrating after the Cubs won the 2016 World Series

On May 8, in the last game of a four-game series at Wrigley Field, Báez hit a solo home run in the bottom of the 13th inning to lead the Cubs to a 4–3 victory and a four-game sweep of the Washington Nationals. On June 28, Báez hit a grand slam in the 15th inning to lead the Cubs in a win over the Cincinnati Reds.

In Game 1 of the 2016 National League Division Series against the San Francisco Giants, Báez hit a solo home run off Giants starter Johnny Cueto in the 8th inning to account for the only run in a 1–0 Cubs victory. It was the first 1–0 win in a playoff game for the Cubs since game 4 of the 1906 World Series against the Chicago White Sox. In Game 4, Báez drove in Jason Heyward to cap off a four-run rally in the top of the ninth, sending the Cubs to the 2016 National League Championship Series with a 6–5 victory.

During the first game of the 2016 National League Championship Series against the Los Angeles Dodgers, Báez stole home in the second inning. He was the first Cub to do this in a postseason game since 1907 when Jimmy Slagle accomplished this against the Detroit Tigers in game four of the 1907 World Series. Báez is also one of only 19 players in baseball history to steal home in a playoff game. Báez and Jon Lester were named NLCS co-MVPs, after Báez hit .318 with five RBIs, four doubles, and two stolen bases in the series, including three hits and three RBIs in Game 5. Baez was part of the Cubs 2016 World Series win against the Cleveland Indians in 7 games, earning his first World Series championship. He was the recipient of the Fielding Bible Award for his "defensive excellence at multiple positions."

==== 2017: Switch to shortstop ====
The ability of Báez to apply quick tags of opposing players attempting to steal second base was acknowledged as among the best ever. Cubs manager Joe Maddon said, "A lot of our success is based on defense, and Javy is so important to that." Báez finished the 2017 regular season with a .273 average, 23 home runs, 24 doubles, 75 RBIs, 75 runs scored, and 10 stolen bases. He was a consistent member of the Cubs' starting lineup at second base (573 innings) and at shortstop (503 innings) filling in for the injured Addison Russell. Báez was 0-for-23 in the NLCS except for the two solo home runs during Game 4. Báez was the recipient of the Fielding Bible's Multi-Position award for the second straight season. John Dewan of the FB organization stated, "Báez possesses arm strength that is above average when he plays on the left side of the diamond, and it becomes downright ridiculous when he is playing second base," says Dewan. "He believes he can make every throw on the diamond, and the vast majority of the time he is correct."

==== 2018: NL MVP runner-up, Silver Slugger, and first All-Star selection ====
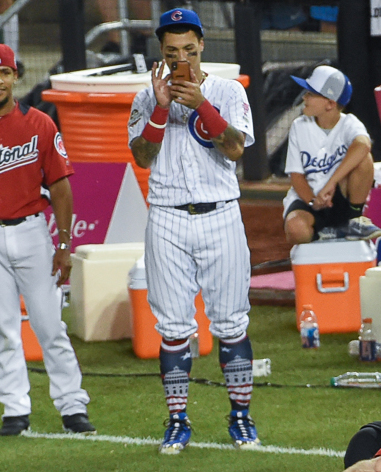
Báez during the 2018 Home Run Derby

On April 10, Báez hit two home runs against the Pittsburgh Pirates. The next day against the Pirates, Báez hit two home runs again. On May 19, Amir Garrett of the Cincinnati Reds struck out Báez and yelled in excitement. Báez approached Garrett and a benches-clearing brawl ensued.

On May 27, in an 8–3 victory against the San Francisco Giants, Báez hit his 13th home run of the year and became the first Cubs player with at least 40 RBIs before Memorial Day since Derrek Lee in 2005. On July 9, while batting .294 with 17 home runs, 63 RBIs, and 16 stolen bases, Báez was named the starting second baseman for the 2018 MLB All-Star Game, his first All-Star selection. Báez was only the second player in MLB history to have at least 18 home runs, 18 doubles, 18 stolen bases, and 5 triples by the All-Star break, Willie Mays was the first. Báez also participated in the 2018 Home Run Derby. On August 23, Báez hit a 481-foot home run, the third-longest home run in MLB in 2018. On September 2, Báez hit his 30th home run of the year and scored his 100th RBI and was the first Cubs middle infielder since 1990 to achieve both in the same year.

In 2018, Báez had 606 at-bats with 176 hits and a batting average of .290. He hit 34 home runs, drove in a league-leading 111 RBIs, and stole 21 bases. He swung and missed at 18.2% of the pitches he saw, second behind only Jorge Alfaro (23.8%) in the NL. He finished second to Christian Yelich of the Milwaukee Brewers in the selection of the Most Valuable Player in the National League. In 2018, Baez was one of three players to record at least 30 home runs, 100 RBI, 100 runs and 20 steals; the other two players were Yelich and Jose Ramirez.

==== 2019: Second All-Star selection ====
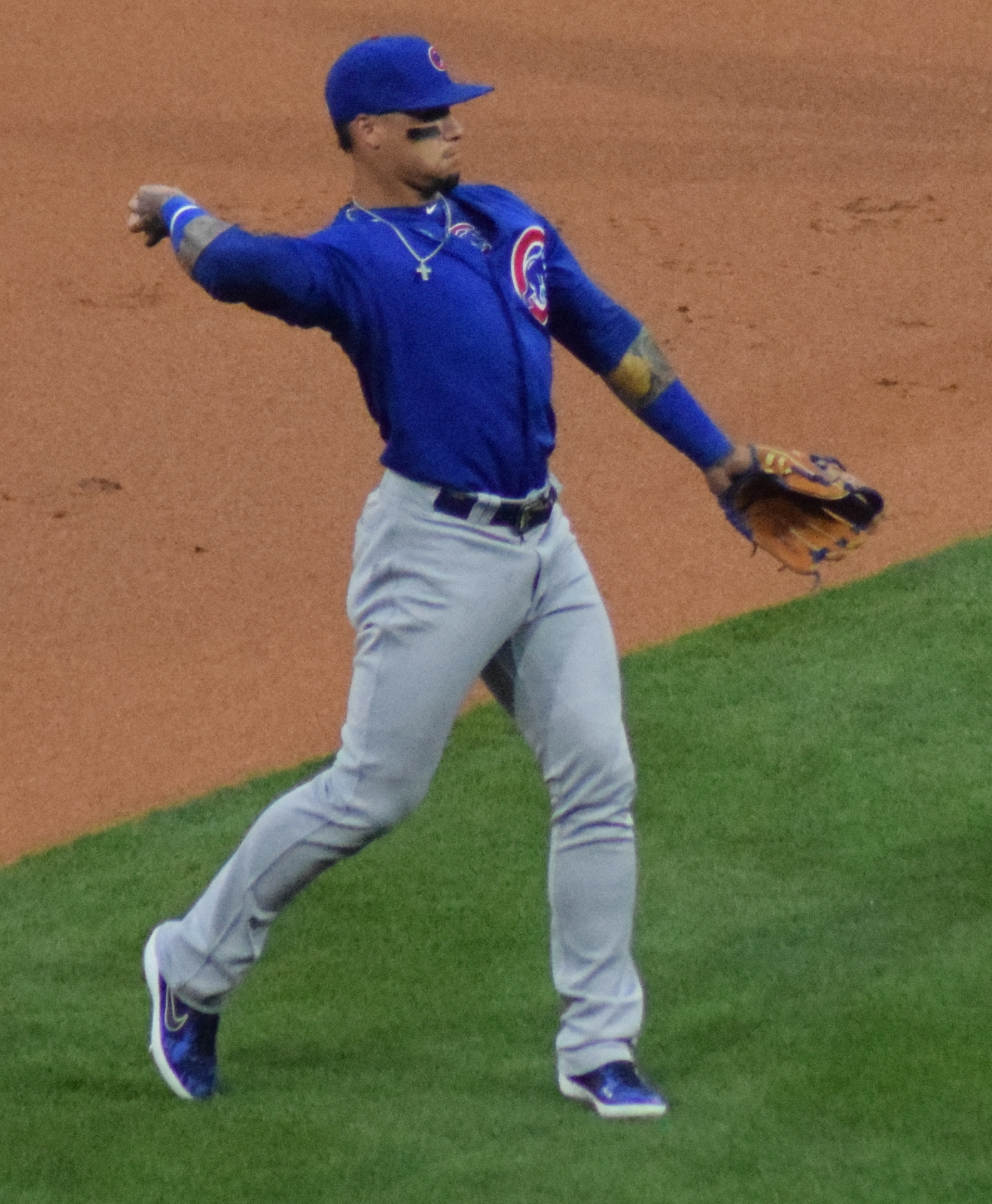
Báez with the Cubs in 2019

Having played 25 games at the shortstop position, Báez was leading in most team-hitting statistics. He had 35 hits in 111 plate appearances with 9 home runs and a batting average of .333. He had 22 RBIs, 15 of which were with 2 outs which led all NL hitters. He continued to display remarkable base-running ability and technique.

Báez hit his 100th career home run on June 23, 2019, off of Seth Lugo against the New York Mets. In July, he was named to his second All-Star Game. Báez also hit lefty in a blowout win vs the Reds with Catcher Kyle Farmer pitching. On May 19, Báez injured his heel while making a barehanded pickup and throw on a grounder. Following his injury, Baez had a slash line of .259/.287/.490 with a 96 wRC+, 27.1% strikeout rate, and 3.9% walk rate until he suffered a fractured thumb on September 1, during a headfirst slide into second base. That effectively ended his 2019 season, though he did have a few pinch-hitting and pinch-running appearances during the last few games of the year in an effort to boost a slumping Cubs team.

Báez placed 5th in the National League in errors with 15. He finished 10th among 15 qualified National League shortstops in fielding percentage. Overall, Báez batted a respectable .281 with 29 home runs and 85 RBIs.

==== 2020: Gold Glove Award winner ====
In 2020, Báez batted .203/.238/.360 in 222 at-bats, and he had the lowest on-base percentage of all qualified NL batters. Báez attributed his struggles at the plate with the ban of in-game video review that MLB implemented in the aftermath of the Houston Astros' sign-stealing scandal. Báez said, "To be honest, it sucks because I make my adjustments during the game... I watch my swing, I watch where the ball went, where the contact was. I'm mad. I'm really mad about that we don't have it." His .581 OPS, .249 wOPA, and 52 wRC+ all ranked dead last and were at least 21% worse than the league average. He also struck out 10 times more frequently than he walked. " Báez won his first career Gold Glove Award in 2020.

==== 2021: Final season in Chicago ====
On May 27, 2021, against the Pittsburgh Pirates with a runner on second and two outs, Báez hit a routine ground ball to the third baseman, who threw to first for the put-out. The throw pulled the first baseman off the bag toward home plate, which allowed the Cubs player on second (Willson Contreras) to safely reach third, who briefly paused in anticipation for the tag out. Instead, Báez stopped his run and ran back towards home plate, with first baseman Will Craig approaching to tag Báez out. The ensuing chase allowed an opportunity for the runner on third an attempt at home plate. The first baseman tossed the ball to the catcher, who missed a swipe tag on Contreras, who was sliding toward home plate. In the meantime, Báez headed to a now-unoccupied first base, which caused second baseman Adam Frazier to rush towards first, but catcher Michael Pérez threw behind Frazier and thus enabled Báez to safely reach first. Báez was able to advance to second base on the wild throw. Báez was ruled to have reached first on an error by the first baseman, and then to have advanced to second on another error by the catcher.

On June 21, 2021, Báez was benched by manager David Ross after he was doubled off first base because he mistakenly thought there were two outs. Near the trade deadline, Báez was hitting .248/.292/.484 with 22 home runs, 65 runs batted in, 48 runs, 15 walks, a league-high 131 strikeouts, and a 2.7 WAR. He had also committed a league-high 18 errors.

=== New York Mets ===
On July 30, 2021, Báez was traded to the New York Mets along with Trevor Williams and cash considerations in exchange for Pete Crow-Armstrong. He decided to wear number 23, along with former teammate Kris Bryant, to honor Cubs' Hall of Famer Ryne Sandberg. He made his Mets debut on July 31 against the Cincinnati Reds. He went 1-for-4, the one hit being a 2-run home run. The Mets would go on to win the game 5–4.

On August 24, Javier Baez moved to second base after his childhood friend Francisco Lindor was activated off the injured list and took over his primary position at shortstop. On August 30, Baez received massive criticism for booing and giving a thumbs down towards Mets fans who booed them. The incident sparked significant backlash from Mets fans and media, with some calling for disciplinary action. Báez and teammate Francisco Lindor held a joint press conference where they apologized for the gesture. Mets owner Steve Cohen said that Baez's behavior was unacceptable, but later praised Báez's hustle following the comeback win. In the game following his controversial remarks, Baez scored a game-winning run to complete a Mets ninth-inning comeback against the Miami Marlins. Booing from Mets fans earlier in the game turned to cheers and thumbs up. The controversy subsided as Báez's performance on the field improved and helped the Mets during their playoff push.

In 2021, he had the worst walk/strikeout ratio in the majors, at 0.15. He swung at and missed 21.7% of all pitches, the highest percentage in MLB.

=== Detroit Tigers ===
==== 2022: First year in Detroit ====
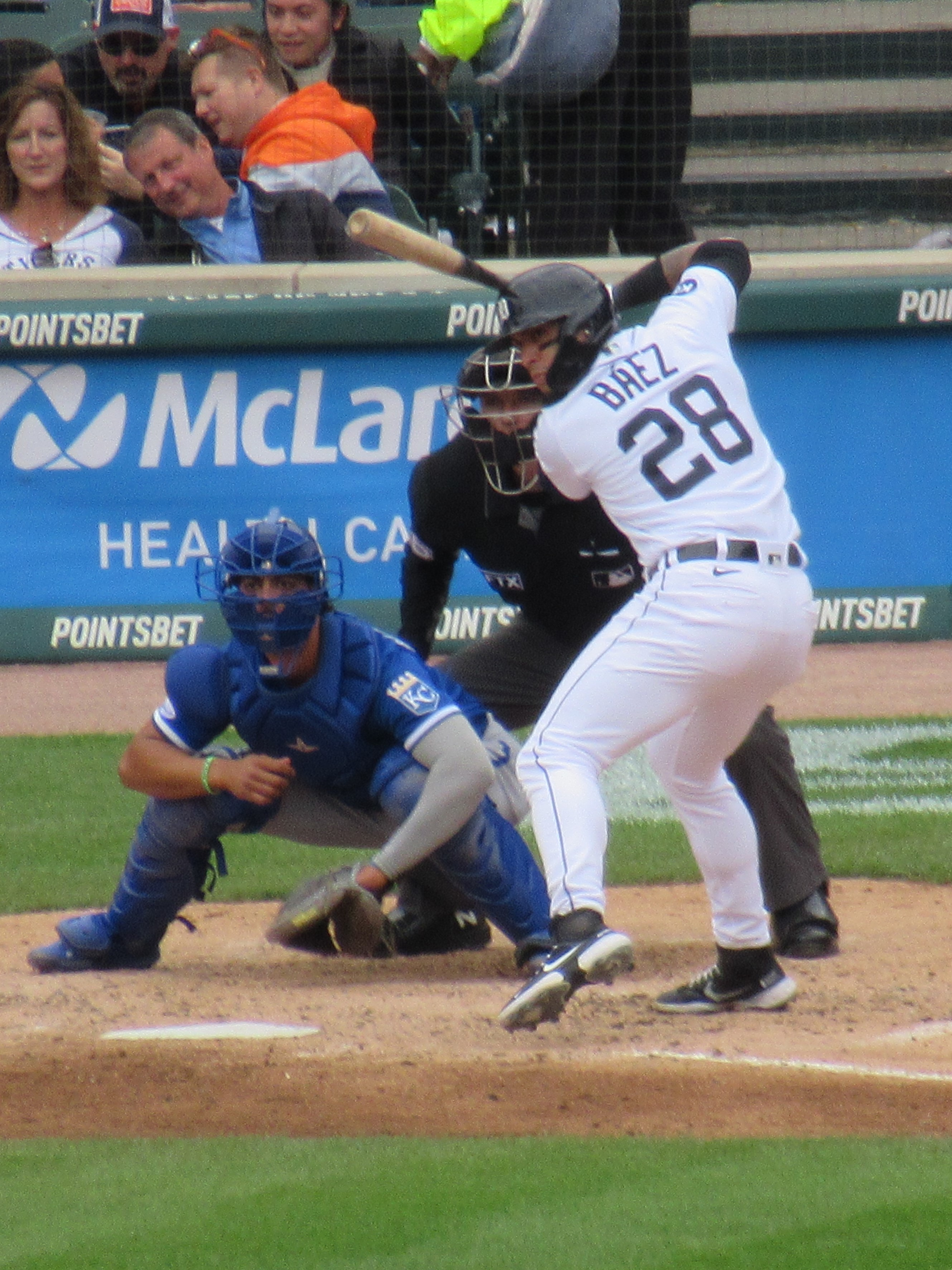
Báez playing for the Detroit Tigers in September 2022

On December 1, 2021, Báez signed a six-year, $140 million contract with the Detroit Tigers. Báez decided to wear the No. 28 with the Tigers, as his No. 9 was already being worn and his No. 23 was retired for Willie Horton.

In his Tigers debut on April 8, 2022, Báez hit a ninth-inning walk-off single to defeat the Chicago White Sox, 5–4. On April 16, the Tigers placed Báez on the 10-day injured list with right thumb soreness. Over his first season in Detroit, Báez hit .238/.278/.393 with 67 RBI, while his 17 home runs were enough to lead a weak-hitting Tigers team. He swung at a higher percentage of pitches outside the strike zone (48.7%) than any other major league batter, and had the highest called strike plus whiff rate in the majors (32.2%).

==== 2023: Continued struggles ====
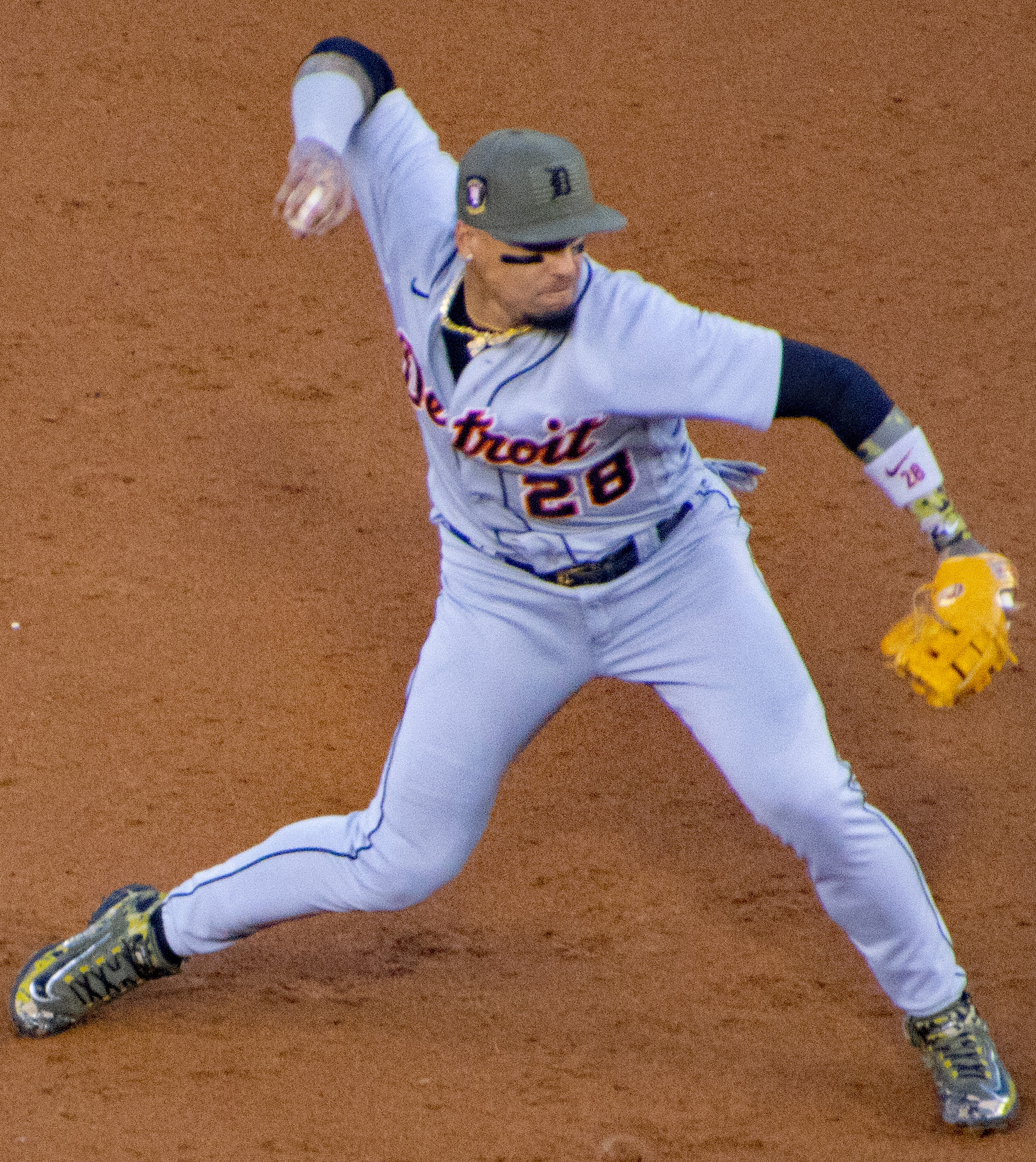
Báez in 2023

On April 5, 2023, Báez was benched by manager A. J. Hinch for "rest purposes" after batting .100/.143/.100 in the first five games. He entered the game in the seventh inning and grounded into a double play. Báez was again benched nine days later in the second inning of the game. After hitting a double where he didn't run hard out of the box, he was doubled off of second base following a routine pop-up where, much like the incident with the Cubs in 2021, he mistakenly thought there were two outs. Hinch pulled Báez into the tunnel with him, telling him he would be benched. Báez later went on to say, "My mind is everywhere right now," and "I'm just trying to focus on my hitting and my timing". A day later, on April 14, Báez went 2-for-3 with a double, two walks, two runs batted in, and a run scored. His performance helped the Tigers defeat the Giants, 7–5 in the 11th inning. The next game, Báez, again, hit a two-run double in the 8th inning, scoring Riley Greene and Nick Maton. He then scored from a single by Spencer Torkelson to tie the game at 6–6. The Tigers went on to win their second straight game in the 11th inning when Miguel Cabrera hit a walk-off single to win, 7–6. In the two games after being benched, the Tigers went 2–0 and Báez went 4-for-8 on ten at-bats, two doubles, four runs batted in, two walks, two strikeouts, and an OPS of 1.350.

On June 21, Báez collected his 1,000th career hit, an RBI single off Brady Singer of the Kansas City Royals. In 2023, he had the lowest OBP in the AL, as he batted .222/.267/.325.

==== 2024: Injury-shortened season ====
Báez's 2024 season was poor as he was significantly impacted by various ailments. In 80 games for Detroit in 2024, he slashed .184/.221/.294 with six home runs, 37 runs batted in, and eight stolen bases. On August 26, the Tigers announced that Báez would miss the remainder of the season for hip surgery. Báez's batting problems were driven in part by a sharp decline in his ability to hit fastballs, a one-time strength that he batted just .207 against in the 2024 season. His performance during the season led Chris Kirschner of The Athletic to call Báez's contract "the worst... in baseball and possibly... the worst deal out of any player in North American sports."

==== 2025: Switch to center field and resurgence ====
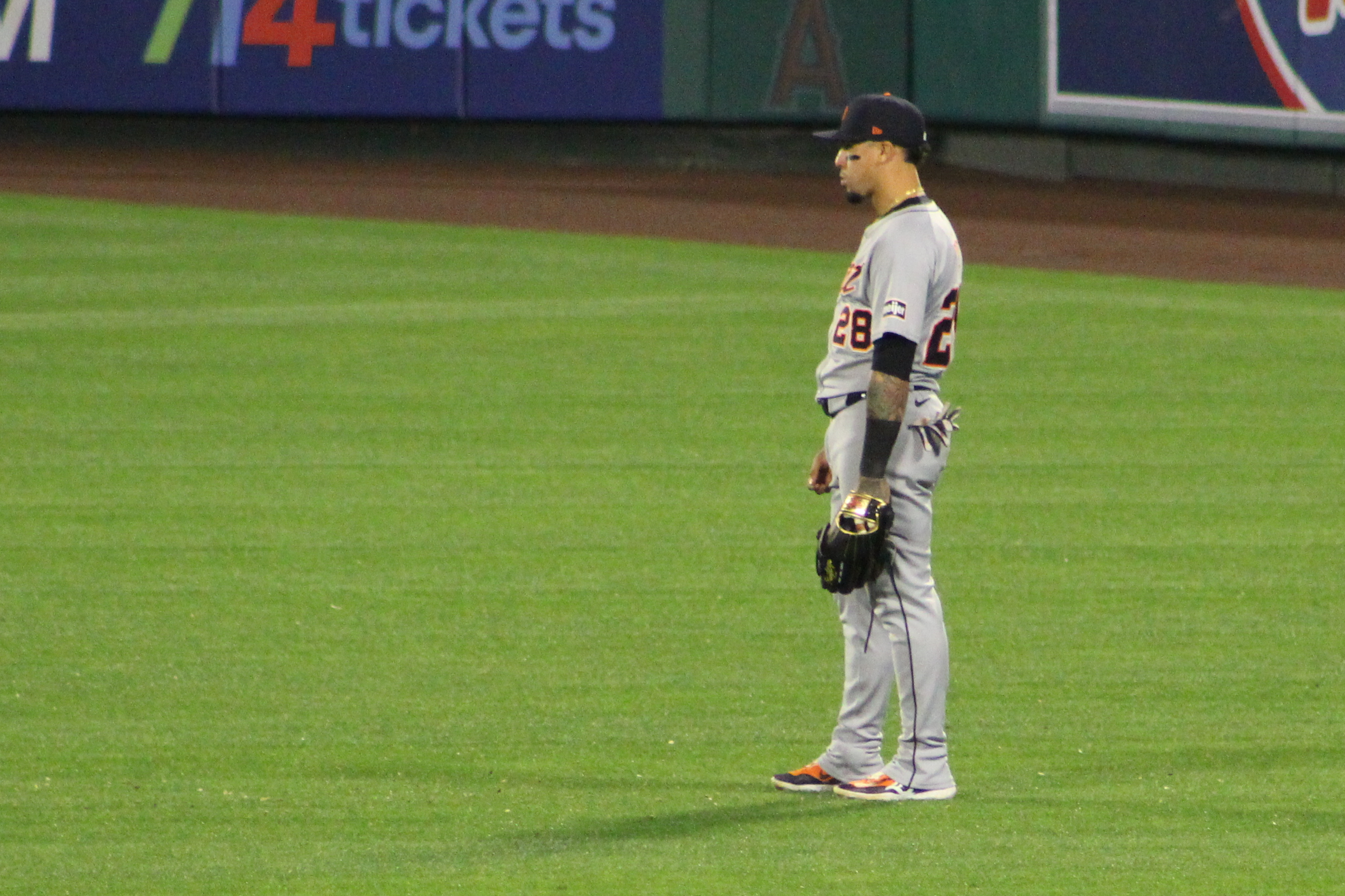
Báez playing center field at Angel Stadium in 2025

During the offseason, Báez rehabbed at his home in Puerto Rico and at the Tigers' spring training complex, Joker Marchant Stadium. During the ALDS games of 2024 Tigers, Baez made his best efforts for his rehab, mentioning in an interview, "After the surgery, I was working out like I was coming back for the playoffs, and I still had like four months to go."

He made his spring training debut on February 28, 2025, against the Toronto Blue Jays. During the spring, Báez saw time at center field and third base. On April 6, Báez made his first game appearance in center field in the eighth inning against the Chicago White Sox after Trey Sweeney pinch-hit for center fielder Ryan Kreidler the inning prior. He would go 3-for-4 with a double and an RBI to help the Tigers defeat the White Sox, 4–3. On April 21, Báez made his first career start in center field, going 1-for-3 while being hit by a pitch and scoring a run. Báez's first home run of the season was a third inning grand slam in a Tigers victory on April 30. In a game against the Los Angeles Angels on May 1, he robbed former teammate Jorge Soler of a home run.

On May 13, Báez had his first multi-homerun game as a member of the Tigers against the Boston Red Sox. The first home run was a three-run shot off Garrett Whitlock in the sixth inning to retake the lead for Detroit. The second homerun was a walk-off three-run shot in the eleventh inning off Greg Weissert. It was Báez's second career walk-off home run and first since 2016. On June 17, Báez had his second two-homer game of the season (and 12th multi-homer game of his career) against the Pittsburgh Pirates.

Báez's changed batting stance allowed his resurgence in the 2025 season. He started to stand closer to the pitcher than before, letting him hit breaking balls more effectively, increasing his batting average against breaking balls from .231 (2023) and .169 (2024) to .304. On July 2, Báez was voted in as a starting outfielder for the 2025 All-Star Game, marking his third career All-Star selection. Notably, each of his selections has come at a different defensive position—second base in 2018, shortstop in 2019, and now outfield in 2025—highlighting his exceptional positional versatility. At the All-Star break, he was hitting .275 with 10 home runs and 39 RBI. He hit only two home runs after the All-Star break, finishing the season with a .257 average, 12 home runs, and 57 RBI.

==== 2026 ====
On April 29, 2026, Báez was placed on the injured list due to a right ankle sprain. He was transferred to the 60-day injured list on June 11. He returned to the Tigers active roster on July 28, playing center field and going 3-for-4 at the plate.

== International career ==
=== World Baseball Classic ===
==== 2017 tournament ====
Baéz played for the Puerto Rican national team in the 2017 World Baseball Classic. On March 10, 2017, Baéz got his first career WBC hit when he hit a single against Deolis Guerra of Venezuela. He also was awarded an RBI. Against the Mexico national baseball team, Baéz went 2-for-5 while hitting his first career home run in the World Baseball Classic. He also got three RBIs and hit a double. Puerto Rico finished pool play with a 3–0 record, winning Pool D. In their second Pool F game, Baéz stole three bases, including two steals of third. They finished 3–0 in Pool F, advancing to the semifinals and won against the Netherlands, 4–3, in the 11th inning. Baéz struggled against the United States team, going 0-for-3 with a strikeout, while they lost the 2017 World Baseball Classic championship, 8–0. Baéz finished the tournament as the stolen bases leader and being voted as the second baseman of the 2017 All-World Baseball Classic team.

==== 2023 tournament ====
Baéz again played for the Puerto Rican national team in the 2023 World Baseball Classic. On March 11, 2023, Báez participated in his first WBC game against the Nicaragua national baseball team, where he went 2-for-4 with a run and an RBI. Against the Israel national baseball team, Báez helped his team with a 2-for-3 slate with two RBIs, two runs, and a steal of third in the first inning. Puerto Rico would finish with a perfect game in eight innings to a score of 10–0. Puerto Rico finished Classic Pool Play with a record of 3–1. That qualified them as runners-up in Pool D, behind the 4–0 Venezuela national baseball team. They played the Mexico national baseball team in Quarterfinal 4. In the quarterfinals, Báez and Eddie Rosario hit back-to-back home runs in the first inning. Mexico would make a comeback to win with a score of 5–4, but Báez finished 3-for-4 with a home run, two RBIs, and a run. Báez finished the 2023 tournament with a slash line of .368/.368/.667, a home run, three doubles, seven total hits, six RBIs, four runs scored, and a stolen base. He was voted as the second baseman of the 2023 All-World Baseball Classic team. Team Puerto Rico qualified for the 2026 World Baseball Classic after finishing in 6th place.

== Playing style ==
Baéz is known for his exceptional infield range and arm strength, with his throws from shortstop clocking up to 92.0 mph. At the plate, he possesses high exit velocity, averaging 89.4 mph and reaching a maximum of 116.7 mph. Báez is also known for his aggressive approach; in 2023, he had a 44% chase rate, one of the highest in baseball, and the lowest on-base percentage in the American League (.267).

== Career highlights ==
=== Championships, awards, and honors ===
Championships earned or shared
Title	Times	Dates	Ref
National League champion	1	2016	
World Series champion	1	2016	

Honors received
Recognition	Times	Dates	Ref
National League All-Star	2	2018, 2019	
WBC All-Tournament Team	2	2017, 2023	
World Future All-Star	2	2017, 2023	
Baseball America Minor League All-Star	1	2013	
Baseball America Triple-A All-Star	1	2015	
FSL Postseason All-Star	1	2013	
FSL Midseason All-Star	1	2013	
SL Postseason All-Star	1	2013	
MiLB.com Organization All-Star	4	2012–2015	

Awards received
Name of award	Times	Dates	Ref
Silver Slugger Award at second base	1	2018	
Gold Glove Award at shortstop	1	2020	
Fielding Bible Award	4	2016–2018, 2020	
NLCS Most Valuable Player Award	1	2016	
Home Run Derby participant	1	2018	
MLBPAA Cubs Heart and Hustle Award	3	2018, 2019, 2021	
National League Player of the Week	1	July 1, 2018	
Major League Baseball Play of the Week	1	May 30, 2021	
Pacific Coast League Player of the Week	1	May 26, 2014	
Florida State League Player of the Week	2	April 29, 2013; June 17, 2013	
Midwest League Player of the Week	1	July 16, 2012	

=== Annual statistical achievements ===
Category	Times	Seasons	Ref
WBC stolen base leader	1	2017	
NL runs batted in leader	1	2018	
NL defensive wins above replacement leader	1	2019	
NL outs made leader	1	2020	
NL strikeouts leader	1	2021	
NL errors committed leader	1	2021	
AL errors committed leader	1	2022	

=== Other achievements ===
- Second FSL player to hit four home runs in a single game (June 10, 2013)
- Hit a home run in the 11th inning of his major league debut (August 5, 2014)
- First MLB player since Joe Cunningham in 1954 to hit three home runs in their first three games (August 5–7, 2014)
- Second MLB second baseman to hit five home runs in first 14 MLB games (2014)
- Hit a single that drove in the winning run to send the Cubs to the 2016 NLCS (October 11, 2016)
- First Cub since Jimmy Slagle in 1907 and 19th MLB player to steal home in a postseason game (October 15, 2016)
- Won the Cubs' first World Series since 1908, ending the club's 108-year drought (November 2, 2016)
- Second MLB player to have 18 home runs, 18 doubles, 18 stolen bases, and five triples by the All-Star break (2018)
- Became the fifth Cub to hit 30 home runs and have 100 RBIs by their age-25 season (September 2, 2018)
- Hit left-handed for the first time against Cincinnati Reds shortstop, Kyle Farmer (August 8, 2019)
- Got his first hit left-handed against New York Mets infielder, Luis Guillorme (April 21, 2021)

== Personal life ==
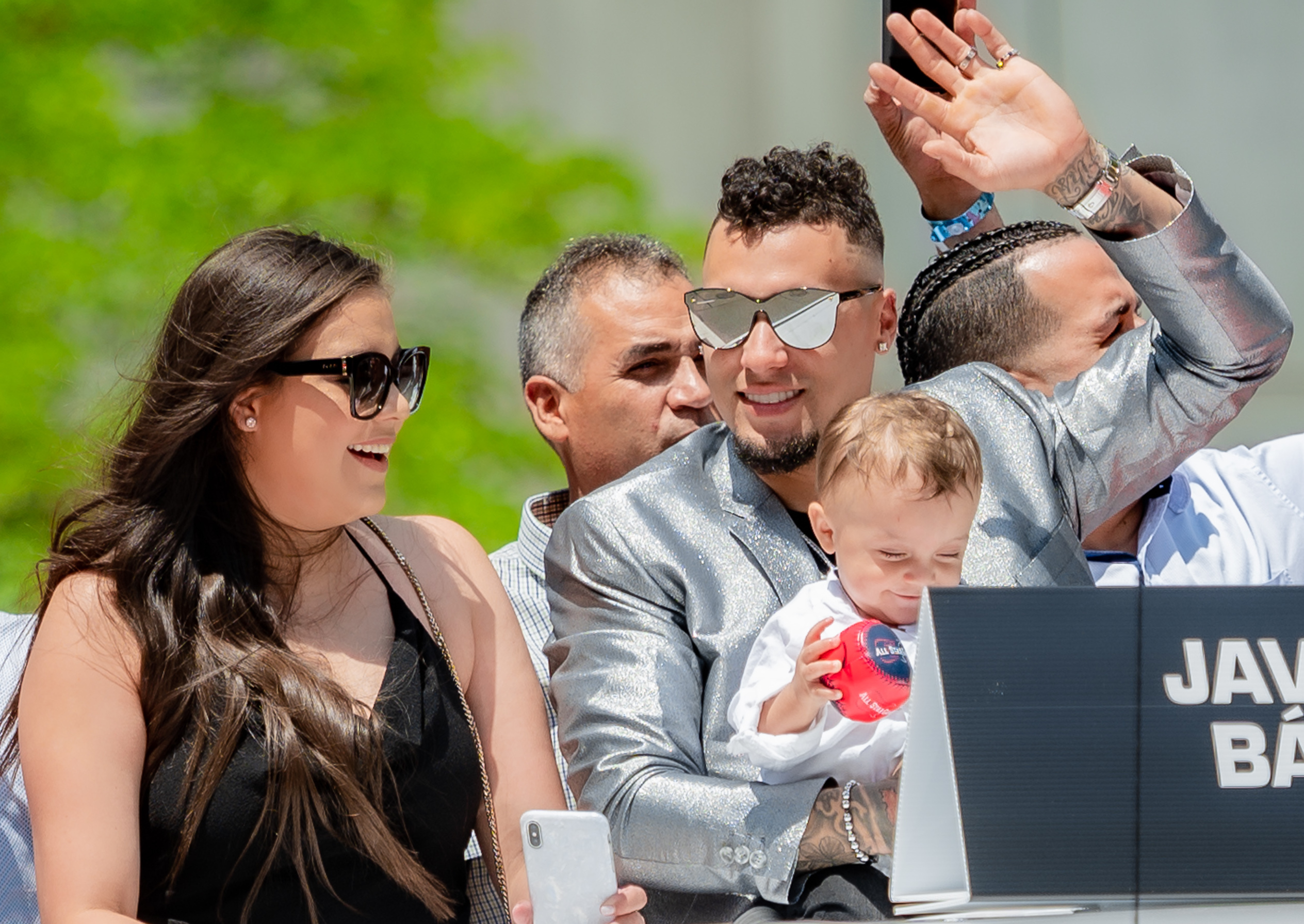
Báez with his wife and child in 2019

Báez's sister, Noely, died on April 8, 2015, aged 21. She had spina bifida. Báez took a leave of absence from the Iowa Cubs to help cope with the loss. Báez is left-hand dominant and eats and writes with his left hand, and suggests this helps his game. On August 8, 2019, Báez batted left handed in a game for the first time against Kyle Farmer, an infielder pitching during a 12–5 blowout in the 9th inning. Báez chose "El Mago" (Spanish for "The Magician") as his nickname for the Players Weekend in 2017 and 2018.

Báez announced his engagement to longtime girlfriend Irmarie Márquez via Twitter on April 11, 2018. Their son was born on June 28, 2018. The couple was married in San Juan, Puerto Rico, on January 26, 2019. Báez's wife, Irmarie, is the sister of Jannieliz Márquez, who is married to Puerto Rican pitcher José Berríos. Báez posed fully nude in ESPN the Magazine's 2017 Body Issue.

== See also ==
- List of Major League Baseball players from Puerto Rico
