= El brujo (disambiguation) =

El brujo is a 1977 Spanish comic book.

El Brujo (Spanish for the "wizard", "warlock", "sorcerer" or "witch doctor") may also refer to:

== Nickname ==
- Amancio Amaro (born 1939), Spanish footballer
- Manuel Fleitas Solich (1900–1984), Paraguayan football player and coach
- José López Rega (1916-1989), Argentina's Minister of Social Welfare
- Dámaso Rodríguez Martín (1945-1991), Spanish serial killer
- José Andrés Martínez (born 1994), Venezuelan soccer player
- Ramiro Mendoza (born 1972), former Major League Baseball pitcher
- Juan Quarterone (born 1935), Argentine footballer
- Cuco Valoy (born 1937), Dominican singer

== Other uses ==
- El Brujo, an archaeological site in Trujillo, La Libertad Province, Peru

== See also ==
- Brujo (disambiguation)
- The Wizard (nickname)
