= Muelona =

Colombian mythological character

La Muelona ("big molar woman"), (also known as Colmillona; "big fang woman") is a character from Colombian mythology, present in the folkloric legends of the populations located in the Andean region (Huila and Tolima) of Colombia.

== Characteristics ==
The woman is characterized by her very visible teeth due to the fact that it seems she always smiles. She is often described as a pretty woman with long hair, penetrating eyes, an extravagant dentition similar to that of a larger animal such as a cow or a horse. La Muelona attacks the walkers that appears at the edge of the path as a very attractive and seductive woman, but once they are in her arms, they are crushed by her teeth. According to mythology she is frequently goes after gamblers, unfaithful men, and alcoholics. Muelona or Colmillona is known not to attack men with a home, a pregnant wife or with newborn children. Her favorite time to appear along the roads is between six in the afternoon and eight in the evening. Muelona is said to have an extremely high libido.

== Origin ==
At the time of the Spanish Empire, there was a bad reputation of women who wanted to destroy homes, deceived men and were not very well received by society. One of them, was "La Maga", who had a business of divination of the future. She quickly became famous, and it spread across the plain, she committed countless atrocities. She preferred that young people detest motherhood, quickly left many homes in ruins, because they invested all their fortune in it. When "La Maga" died, the house was filled with a nauseating smell, to the point of having to leave immediately. His house turned dark and in it is hear whispers about her revenge against the players and infidels. After this, the legend came to life and spread rapidly through the villages after the disappearance of several peasants from the surrounding area.

== See also ==
- Muisca mythology

== Bibliography ==
- Ocampo López, Javier (1996), Leyendas populares colombianas - Popular Colombian legends (in Spanish), Plaza y Janes Editores, pp. 1–384, ISBN 9789581402670
