= Brujería (disambiguation) =

Brujería is the Spanish term for witchcraft.

Brujería may also refer to:

- Brujeria (band), death metal band
- "Brujería" (Aja song)
- "Brujería" (Shakira song)
- "Brujería" (Son de Sol song), Spanish entry at the 2005 Eurovision Song Contest
- "Brujería", a song by Christina Aguilera, featured on her ninth studio album, Aguilera (2022)
