= The Magician (Stein novel) =

Novel by Sol Stein

- First edition
- Author: Sol Stein
- Language: English
- Genre: Novel
- Publisher: Delacorte Press
- Publication date: 1971
- Media type: Print (Paperback)

The Magician is a novel by Sol Stein. It has sold more than a million copies.

== Plot introduction ==
The Magician was published in 1971 and uses a violent incident in a high school to explore the wider issues of the time. It challenges the view that America is a classless society, and suggests racism was still prevalent in a decade that would see momentous change and decay. It is also a bitter critique of the justice system.

== Plot summary ==
The story takes place in Ossining, New York. Ed Japhet is sixteen years old, and he is a bright, articulate boy. His father Terence teaches at his school. Ed's hobby is performing magic tricks, hence he is the "magician" of the title. One evening, Ed performs in front of the school on prom night, and aggravates school hoodlum Urek. Urek and his gang wait for Ed that night as he is about to go home with his dad and girlfriend. Urek attacks Ed and nearly kills him. Urek is eventually arrested on a charge of serious assault.

At first this looks like a straightforward case. But Urek's dad happens to have a lawyer named Thomassy, who has made it his life's work to defend the low-lifes and the criminals of the area - and to get them off the hook.

When Thomassy started his promising career as a lawyer he joined a firm with WASP surnames deliberately. They took him on and he became their most brilliant lawyer. However, the senior partner told him that as an Armenian he would never get promoted, at least while he was alive. Thomassy, stung, left and decided to follow a controversial path defending the most undesirable characters in society. He sends a birthday card every year to the old senior partner, as if to say, "You still alive?" As the story unfolds, the reader becomes uncomfortably aware of how an event can be interpreted by the law. It seems as though Ed has the advantage, he is talented, with a nice family and girlfriend, horribly attacked and nearly killed by a brute. But Thomassy manages to play the attack down: he discredits witnesses, intimidates others, and portrays Urek as acting only in self-defense. Now the reader is unsure who the actual "magician" of the title really is.

Also involved is German Jewish Psychiatrist Koch, who has taken an interest in the case. His involvement gives the reader an opportunity to see Urek in more depth, as previously he is portrayed as a mindless, violent and inarticulate monster. Nothing can excuse what he has done, but Koch offers more insight as to why he did it. The book ends on a violent note. Urek walks free from the assault charge and proceeds to attack Ed again, this time by hiding in Terence's car and leaping out at Ed. Ed, newly trained in Karate, can now defend himself against the thuggish Urek, with devastating results. Terence Japhet knows exactly whom to call. The book is written in the third person narrative style, but interspersed at intervals throughout the story are "comments" provided by the key characters. They are written in the style of statements, but the reader never knows to whom they are directed.

== Major themes ==
Although this is a story about high school kids, it represents America at the tail end of the 1960s and the beginning of the 1970s. Racism appears rife, for example the treatment of Thomassy by the Law firm, but Thomassy himself is guilty of assessing whether a character has "a little bit of black somewhere along the line". Urek is described as Slavic in appearance. During the trial Thomassy calls him "Stanley", the prosecution calls him "Stanislaus" as if to emphasize his Slavic (and therefore undesirable) background. Terence Japhet thinks America is at war with itself.

The book highlights too the attitudes of both the kids and the parents to their peers. Thomassy has a stool pigeon in the bowling alley because he knows there will be more trouble brewing there than at the golf club. Resentful working class fathers plot to destroy the garages of the more snooty dads. Small town America is seething with violence. But perhaps it is Thomassy who is the most compelling character, driven as he is by his need to win seemingly hopeless cases, letting the criminal element continue to disrupt the lives of the white middle class. As a weary Ed Japhet says to his parents- "Who's worse, Thomassy or Urek?"

== Critical reception ==
The New York Times deemed the novel "superior fiction ... a spectacular read."
