= El amor brujo (disambiguation) =

El amor brujo is a piece of music originally composed by Manuel de Falla for a chamber group.

El amor brujo may also refer to:

- El amor brujo (novel), a 1932 Argentine novel by Roberto Arlt
- El Amor Brujo (film) or Bewitched Love, a 1967 Spanish drama film by Francisco Rovira Beleta
- El Amor brujo (1986 film), a Spanish film
