= Mary Cheever =

Mary Cheever (née Winternitz; May 4, 1918 – April 7, 2014) was an American poet, teacher, and local historian. Her books include The Need for Chocolate & Other Poems (1980) and The Changing Landscape: A History of Briarcliff Manor-Scarborough (1990).

She was the wife of writer John Cheever and the mother of writers Susan Cheever and Benjamin Cheever.

== Career ==
Cheever graduated from Sarah Lawrence College in 1939. By 1964, she was teaching English literature at Briarcliff College three days a week. She also worked as fiction editor of Westchester Magazine. Her poetry collection, The Need for Chocolate & Other Poems, was published by Stein and Day in 1980.

Her local history, The Changing Landscape, was published in 1990 for the Briarcliff Manor-Scarborough Historical Society by Phoenix Publishing. She gave talks at the Ossining Library and other venues about the area's buildings, residents, and history.

== Personal life ==
Her father was Milton C. Winternitz, dean of the Yale School of Medicine. She married John Cheever in 1941. They had three children: Susan, Benjamin, and Federico. Susan and Benjamin became writers.

They bought a house on Cedar Lane in Ossining in 1961, where she lived for many years. She died at home on April 7, 2014, aged 95.

== Family memoirs and literary estate ==
Susan Cheever discussed her mother's family in Treetops: A Family Memoir (1991). A review in Publishers Weekly highlighted the book's treatment of the differing opportunities and expectations faced by the family's men and women, including Mary's career as a teacher. Susan later said that she had made changes to Home Before Dark at her family's request and removed a chapter from Treetops at her mother's request.

In 1988, Mary and her children Susan and Benjamin sought to prevent Academy Chicago Publishers from issuing a collection of John Cheever's early stories. The publisher was eventually permitted to release a smaller collection of stories in the public domain.

== Selected works ==
- The Need for Chocolate & Other Poems. Stein and Day, 1980. ISBN 9780812827286.
- The Changing Landscape: A History of Briarcliff Manor-Scarborough. Phoenix Publishing, 1990. ISBN 9780914659495.
