= Welsh Wizard =

The Welsh Wizard, singular or plural, is a nickname that has been applied to various Welsh people and entities including:

== People ==
- Jonathan Davies (rugby, born 1962), professional rugby union footballer
- Elfyn Evans, rally driver
- Nicky Grist, rally co-driver
- Andrew Pagett, snooker player
- Freddie Welsh, boxer
- Howard Winstone, boxer

== Organisations ==
- Aberavon RFC (est. 1876), rugby union club termed "The Welsh Wizards" among similar nicknames

== See also ==
- Welsh mythology, for various mythological wizards associated with Wales
