= Dámaso Centeno =

Argentine lawyer, politician and philanthropist

Dr. Dámaso Centeno (10 March 1850 in Rosario – 11 October 1892 in Cosquín) was an Argentine lawyer, politician and philanthropist. He was elected deputy for his province for three terms, 1882–1884, 1886–1890 and 1890–1894, the final mandate being cut short by his early and sudden death.

He was the son of Dámaso Centeno senior and Cecilia Fernández. His father, a colonel in the army, was killed at the Battle of Cepeda of 1859. Following studies in law at the University of Buenos Aires, he graduated with an LLD in 1878.

He created a school in Córdoba, and then from 8 April 1891, founded an orphanage for children, like himself, who had lost fathers in the military. The location was the house of his mother, with financial and practical support from a group of officers' wives. This "Asilo de Huérfanos de Militares" became the basis for the government-funded Instituto Social Militar Dr. Dámaso Centeno in Buenos Aires approved by the Peronist government in 1947.
