= Instituto Social Militar Dr. Dámaso Centeno =

Argentine military school

Instituto Social Militar "Dr. Dámaso Centeno"
- Motto: "Instruir es construir"
- Motto in English: "Instructing is building"
- Type: [Private]
- Established: July 12, 1891
- Location: Buenos Aires, Argentina
- Colors: Green and yellow
- Mascot: Damasito
- Website: http://www.damasocenteno.edu.ar

The Instituto Social Militar Dr. Dámaso Centeno (ISMDDC) is an Argentine military school and orphanage located in the city of Buenos Aires (pre-school, kindergarten, primary, and secondary-high school) located at Av. Rivadavia 5550. It was created by Law No. 13,043, sanctioned October 2, 1947, for the purpose of the education and assistance of orphans of the military without means and other military family members. The institute is under the authority of the Argentine Army, though the school was transferred to civilian supervision in 1988.

== History ==
Its administration was in the hands of the Society for the Protection of Military Orphans, under the supervision of the Ministry of War. The Society said it had been constituted under the name "Society for the Protection of Military Orphans", July 12, 1891, and, realizing its motto of "Building is instruct", opened the facilities on January 1, 1892, the property transferred by the Ministry of War in Callao 996, appointed godfather to the President of the Republic, Dr. Carlos Pellegrini and godmother, Mrs. Louise de Cordero. In 1909, the "Orphan Asylum of Military" changed its name to "Military College of Orphans." By that time, the Institute was regulated in terms of its hourly load and programs, so schools identified for prosecutors, pronounced complete primary education and implement the preparation Military, Naval and Commercial for boys, girls receiving instruction in music, embroidery, lingerie, and ironing, under the leadership of religious adscriptas the Establishment.

== Founder ==
Dámaso Centeno junior was born in Rosario on March 10, 1850. His parents were Colonel Don Damaso Centeno and Ms. Cecilia Fernandez. Being very small, after the battle of Cepeda, whose father was an orphan along with her sister Petrona. His university studies conducted in Buenos Aires received Doctor of Jurisprudence in 1878. It was stressed by his eloquence and acendrado patriotism, his philanthropic spirit, and her kind heart and always concerned about childhood carenciada, created a school in the city of Cordoba, where he had ido seeking a palliative for its broken health. From a very early age had an active participation in politics, being a Member of the Legislature of the Buenos Aires province from 1877 to 1882 and deputy national for his province into three periods: 1882 - 1884, 1886-1890 and 1890-1894, not complying its entire mandate by the death of October 11, 1892, Cosquín, province of Córdoba, Argentina.

== Field Sports ==
In 1997 resulted harnessing total land surface of Field Sports, which has a length of 12 has located in the town of Villa Martelli Buenos Aires belonging to the State National (Argentine Army) and disposed of on the use Command Military Institutes for the development of educational activities and sports ISMDDC since May 11, 1993, occupying a fraction of land of former barracks Engineers Battalion 601, Unit who changed his seat at the Garrison Campo de Mayo.

The sports field has five football pitches, a rugby, hockey, swimming pool, a triangle that allows the armed two volleyball courts and one of basketball simultaneously, or a handball in the alternative with the previous ones. Also developed a complementary structure of locker rooms, nursing, and other units, suitable for teaching the subject of physical education and recreation of the educational community of ISMDDC.

== Mascot ==
The school mascot was created for the first time in 2D design, that was to be the winner of the contest organized by the Institute for the "pet" that represent the school during the Games Cultural and Sports. Then it was created the version of "3D Damasito" carrying the banner of the Institute, by Rosa Maria Alvarez. The main feature of this character, it has been encouraged to be part of a commercial for the Institute.

== Notable alumni ==
-Charly García

-Nito Mestre

-Hilda Lizarazu

-Carlos Stornelli

-Victoria Eugenia Villaruel
