= Little Magician =

Little Magician may refer to:

== Film ==
- Mostafa aw al-sahir al-saghir (Mostafa or the Little Magician), a 1932 Egyptian film
- Magic Magic 3D, a 2003 Indian film, dubbed in Hindi as Chota Jadugar (Little Magician)

== People ==
- Martin Van Buren (1782–1862), eighth President of the United States
- Philippe Coutinho (born 1992), Brazilian footballer
- Lionel Messi (born 1987), Argentine footballer
