= Dámaso Rodríguez Martín =

Spanish serial killer and rapist

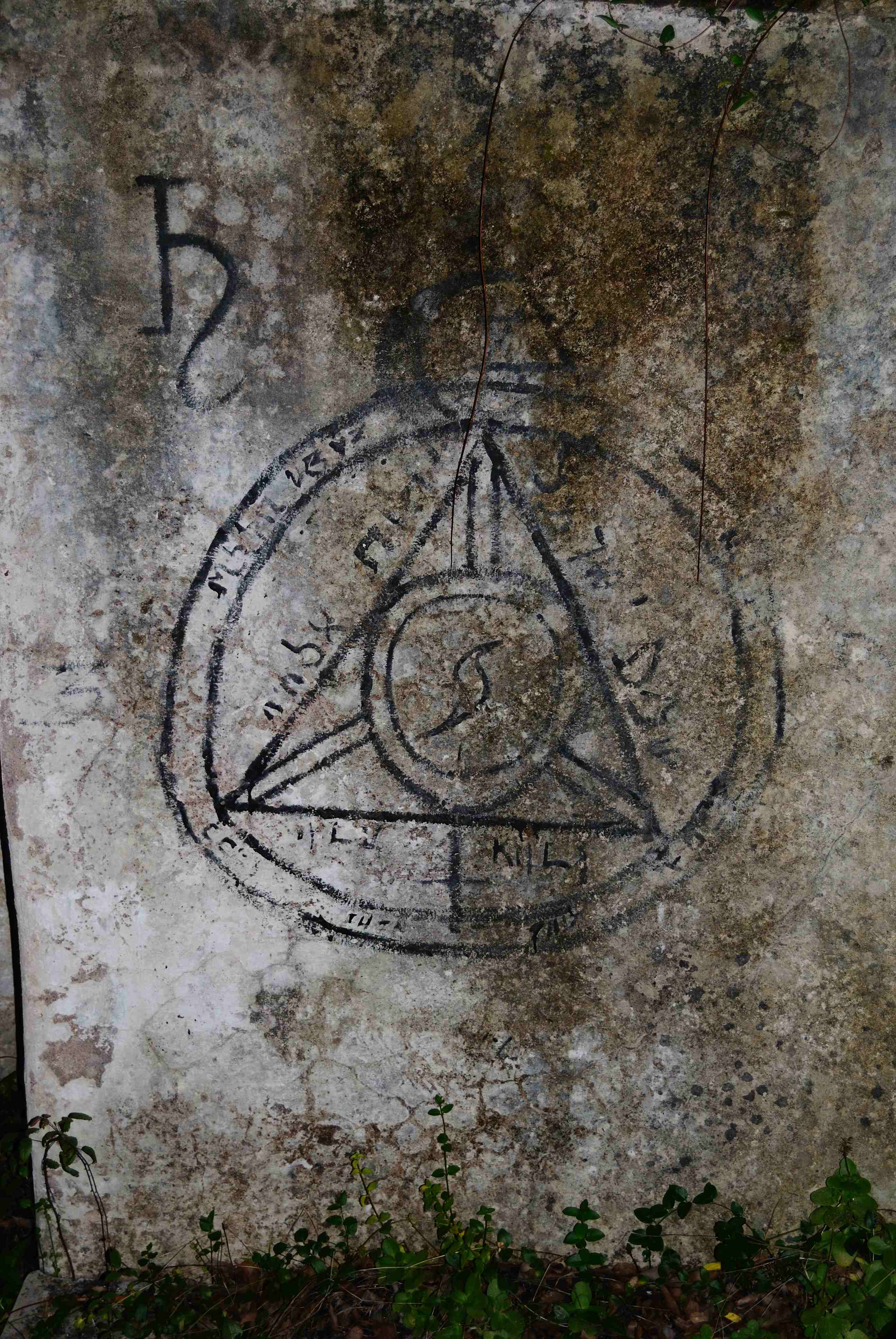
- Magic symbol in the abandoned house where Dámaso Rodríguez Martín hid in the mountains of Anaga.
- Born: Dámaso Rodríguez Martín; December 11, 1944; El Batán, San Cristóbal de La Laguna, Tenerife, Canary Islands
- Died: February 19, 1991 (aged 46); El Solís, Tegueste, Tenerife, Canary Islands
- Cause of death: Suicide
- Other names: "El Brujo", "Maso"

Details
- Victims: 3
- Span of crimes: 1981–1991
- Country: Spain
- State: Canary Islands
- Date apprehended: Committed suicide to avoid apprehension

Dámaso Rodríguez Martín (December 11, 1944 – February 19, 1991), better known as El Brujo (The Warlock) or Maso, was a Spanish serial killer and rapist who, in 1991, was responsible for three murders in the Anaga mountain area in Tenerife, where he sought refuge after his escape from the Tenerife II Prison, where he was serving a sentence for a violation and one of his killings.

Following the murder of a German couple, "El Brujo" became the most wanted criminal by Spain's security forces. Due to the severity of his crimes and the media coverage surrounding them, Dámaso is regarded as the Canary Islands' most infamous killer.

== Biography ==
=== Birth and early years ===
Dámaso Rodríguez Martín was born on December 11, 1944, in the place known as Las Montañas, in the village of El Batán (municipality of San Cristóbal de La Laguna, Tenerife, Spain). His parents were Martín Rodríguez Silveria and Celestina Martín Perdomo, and he had four brothers.

His family was very poor, but despite this, his parents tried to give him a good education. The young Rodríguez started to perform criminal acts at a very young age. When he was just 17, he was accused of theft and arrested, and after his release a year later in September 1963, he joined the Spanish Legion and was sent to Western Sahara. In 1966, he graduated from the Spanish Legion.

Subsequently, Rodríguez went back to Tenerife and, in 1967, married Mercedes Martín Rodríguez and settled in a place known as El Peladero, in the village of Las Mercedes in San Cristóbal de La Laguna. Their first child was born in 1973, followed by in 1975 by a second child.

=== Murders and escape ===
He committed his first murder on November 11, 1981, when he killed a young man who was with his girlfriend in his Mazda, in the area of El Moquinal. Rodríguez was a voyeur who liked to watch couples having sex. He then killed the young man and beat and sexually assaulted the girl while her dead boyfriend's body was still in the vehicle. He then drove the body and the girl to "Llano de los Viejos", where he abandoned them.

Investigators from the National Police asked around the area about a violent individual, a "night stalker", who knew the mountains and also strolled about at night looking for couples. All information pointed to Dámaso Rodríguez. "El Brujo" was sentenced to 55 years in prison for murder, rape, theft of a firearm and unlawful possession of weapons. Rodríguez escaped from prison on January 17, 1991, and fled to the mountains of Anaga. Initially he returned to his home with the intention of murdering his wife, because she had distanced herself from him while he was in prison. However, he could not do it because she was accompanied by family and friends. Rodríguez relocated to the mountains, waiting for the opportunity to murder his wife.

On January 23, the body of German tourist Karl Flick was found on the forest road leading to El Solís. The next day, at 3:15 PM, in a remote area of the Roque de El Moquinal, the Civil Guard recovered the body of Flick's wife, Marta Küpper, who showed obvious signs of strangulation. Speculations, sightings, Rodríguez's escape at the last moment, robberies in caves and in the houses of hunters or farmers fed the legend of "El Brujo". Later, he would sexually assault another woman.

These events overshadowed the celebration of the Carnival of Santa Cruz de Tenerife of that year, mainly due to the fear that aroused among the people that the murderer would show up in a costume, and could easily escape.

=== Death ===
On February 19, a family moved to a house in the area near El Solís, only to find their door was forced open. They alerted the police, who dispatched two Civil Guards from Tacoronte, led by a sergeant commander, who detected Rodríguez's presence in the home.

When the non-commissioned officer tried to enter, he was met with shotgun fire. The agent returned fire, shooting several times, but Rodríguez had no intentions of surrendering. Instead, he opted to end his life, placing his hunting shotgun under his chin and firing using his toes. However, due to the length of the weapon, he survived. Subsequently, there was another exchange between the officer and Rodríguez, who killed himself on the second attempt.

== In popular culture ==
- In 2003, the Televisión Canaria premiered a series entitled "Noche del Crimen" that reconstructs the most famous crimes that have taken place in the Canary Islands in recent years. The series was directed by the Canarian filmmaker Javier Caldas. One of the episodes of the series was dedicated to Dámaso Rodríguez Martín, being the most successful reconstruction of the case. On this occasion, the reconstruction of the crimes was scripted and directed by Aaron J. Melián, with music by Raúl Capote.

== See also ==
- List of serial killers by country
