= Etymology of Karnataka =

Origin of the Indian state's name

Several etymologies have been suggested for the name of the Indian state of Karnataka. The region was popularly referred to as 'kar nata’ literally meaning black soiled county in Indian history. However, historically, the names Karnatak or Carnatic have been misapplied to refer to the regions in or beyond the Western Ghats (Kodagu and Kerala) as well as to a region in present-day Andhra Pradesh (Telangana). The other accepted derivative comes from the words kar and nādu meaning land of black soil, or from the words kar/karu/kari meaning Black and Nāḍu meaning region/country in Dravidian languages, referring to the black soil of the area. One more derivative is "Karnad" meaning "land of Black soil" and other derivative is from Dravidian word 'Kari' meaning 'black'

Scholars have tried to interpret Karnataka in various ways. One view is that the original Kannada which was the name of the land, has been sanskritized as Karnata. The author of Kavirajamarga calls this land as Karnata. So does Kannada poet Andayya. The second view is that it is because of two tribes namely Karna and Nata who inhabited the territory that the land came to be so known. According to the third view, people called Kan and Kal inhabited. this land and that is why the territory came to be known as Kannada. A popular view is that the land is of black soil (Kari+Nāḍu) and from this is derived 'Karnāḍu.' But the most accepted view is that the word 'Karnata' is derived from karu+nadu, the big land or an elevated land. Major parts of Karnataka are situated in the Deccan Plateau and are therefore an elevated country.

== References from Hindu texts ==
The earliest known references to Karnataka are found in the Sabha Parva and the Bhishma Parva of Mahabharata, an ancient Indian epic. The Matsya Purana, Skanda Purana, Markandeya Purana and the Bhagavata Purana also make references to the name Karnata. The celebrated Kannada folk song of antiquity Punyakoti (Govina Haadu) also refers to the region as "Mereyutiha Karnata Desha" (Flourishing Karnata country), finds a reference in Padma Purana.

In Canto 5 - Chapter 6 of the Bhagavata Purana, Karnata is mentioned while narrating the life of Rishabhadeva. It is said in the Bhagavata that the Lord in Rishabhadeva's form ended his avatara in the Kutakachala hill in Karnata province. Kutakchala is a hill in present-day Karnataka near Kollur in the Western Ghats.

== Historical references ==
Sanskrit grammarian Pāṇini and the ancient Sanskrit work Mrichchhakatika (c. 5th century CE) make references to Karnataka. In the 5th century CE, the term Karnataka was used by the astrologer Varaha Mihira in his work Brihatkatha and the Birur plates of Kadamba Vishnuvarma call Shantivarma The master of the entire Karnataka region. In the 7th century CE, Rashtrakuta inscriptions refer to the armies of Chalukyas of Badami as Karnatakabala. The Tamil classic Silappatikaram of the same time period calls the people of present-day Karnataka region as Karunatakars. The Kalingathu parani, a war poem written by jayangkondar in Tamil Literature calls a people of a region called 'Karunatiyar'. In the 9th century CE, the Kannada classic Kavirajamarga hails the entire region between the rivers Kaveri and Godavari as Karnata. Kathasaritsagara of 11th century CE makes mentions of the name. In the 13th century CE, Kannada poet Andayya's works use the same terminology. In the late 16th century, a Telugu work Vasucharitamu refers to Tirumala Deva Raya (1570 CE), the first of the Aravidu (Aravithi) line of rulers of the late Vijayanagar Empire as the reviver of the Karnata Empire. All this clearly shows that the name Karnataka has been in usage consistently since ancient times.

== Alternate theories ==
Karnataka's name may have originated from the two words Kabbu Nadu, which means land of sugarcane. This etymology might be possible as Karnataka is a huge sugarcane-cultivating land. But, this theory might not be very factual as sugarcane production boomed in South Karnataka only after the building of KRS Dam by Sir M. Vishweshwarayya. Before that the very same region of Karnataka was known for ragi production.
