= Krishnavarma I =

- Dharmamahārājadhirāja

King of the Kadamba Kingdom
- Reign: c. 430 - 460 CE
- Predecessor: Kakusthavarma
- Successor: Vishnuvarma
- House: Kadamba

Krishnavarma I (c. 430) was a Kadamba king. When the Pallava threat loomed, Santivarma divided his kingdom in c. 455 and let his younger brother Krishnavarma I rule over the southern portion and deal with the Pallavas. The branch is called the Triparvata branch and ruled from either Devagiri in the modern Dharwad district or Halebidu.

== Life ==
Krishnavarma I had two sons named Vishnuvarma and Devavarma.
