= Vishnuvarma =

- Dharmamahārājadhirāja

King of the Kadamba Kingdom
- Reign: c. 460 - 485 CE
- Predecessor: Krishnavarma I
- Successor: Simhavarma
- House: Kadamba

Vishnuvarma (c. 460) was a Kadamba king. He praised the rule of Santivarma in one of his inscriptions.

== Life ==
Vishnuvarma installed Birur inscriptions. He allied with Pallava king Chandadanda.
