= Rishabhanatha =

First Tirthankara of Jainism

- 1st Tirthankara
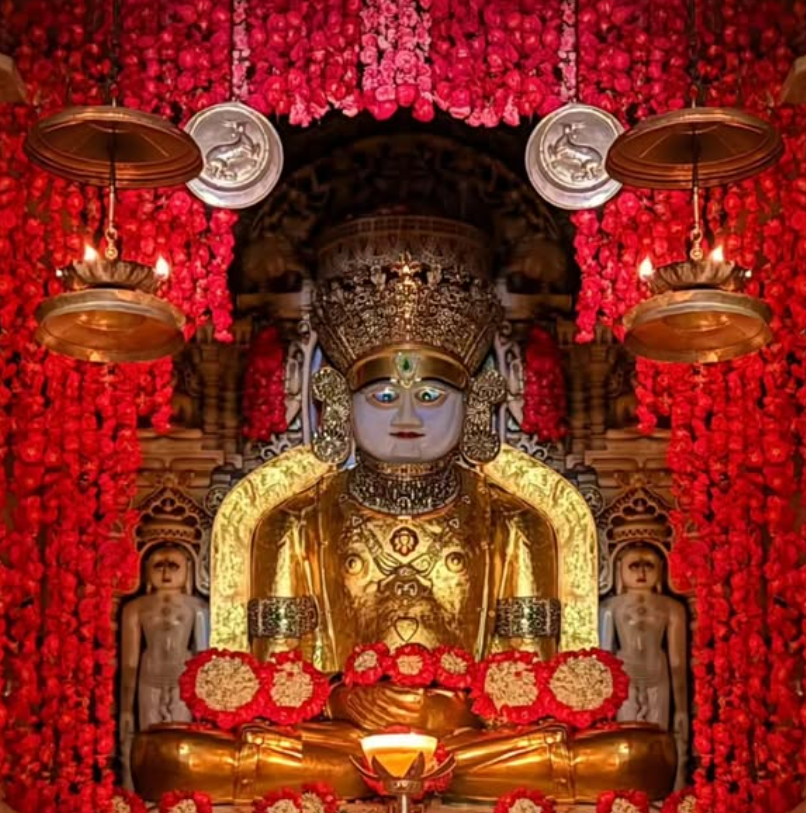
- Idol of Rishabhanatha at Palitana
- Other names: Ādinātha, Ādeśvara (the first conqueror), Ādarśa Puruṣa (perfect man), Ikṣvāku
- Venerated in: Jainism
- Predecessor: Sampratti (last Tirthankara of the previous time-cycle)
- Successor: Ajitanatha
- Mantra: Oṃ Ṛṣabhadevāya Namaḥ; Oṃ Śrī Ādināthāya Namaḥ
- Symbol: Bull
- Height: 500 dhanuṣ (1,500 meters)
- Age: 8.4 million purvas (592.704 × 10^{18} years) according to some later works
- Tree: Banyan
- Color: Golden
- Texts: Triṣaṣṭiśalākāpuruṣacarita; Āvaśyaka Niryukti; Kalpa Sutra; Bhaktāmara Stotra
- Gender: Male
- Festivals: Akshaya Tritiya

Genealogy
- Born: Ṛṣabha; Ayodhya
- Died: Ashtapada
- Parents: Kulakara Nabhi (father); Marudevi (mother)
- Spouse: Sumaṅgalā/Yaśasvatī; Sunandā/Nandā
- Children: • 100 sons (including: Chakravarti Bharata, prince Nami, and Kamadeva Bahubali) according to Jainism • 2 daughters: Brāhmī and Sundarī (Mahasatis); Reference:
- Dynasty: Founder of Ikṣvākuvaṁśa

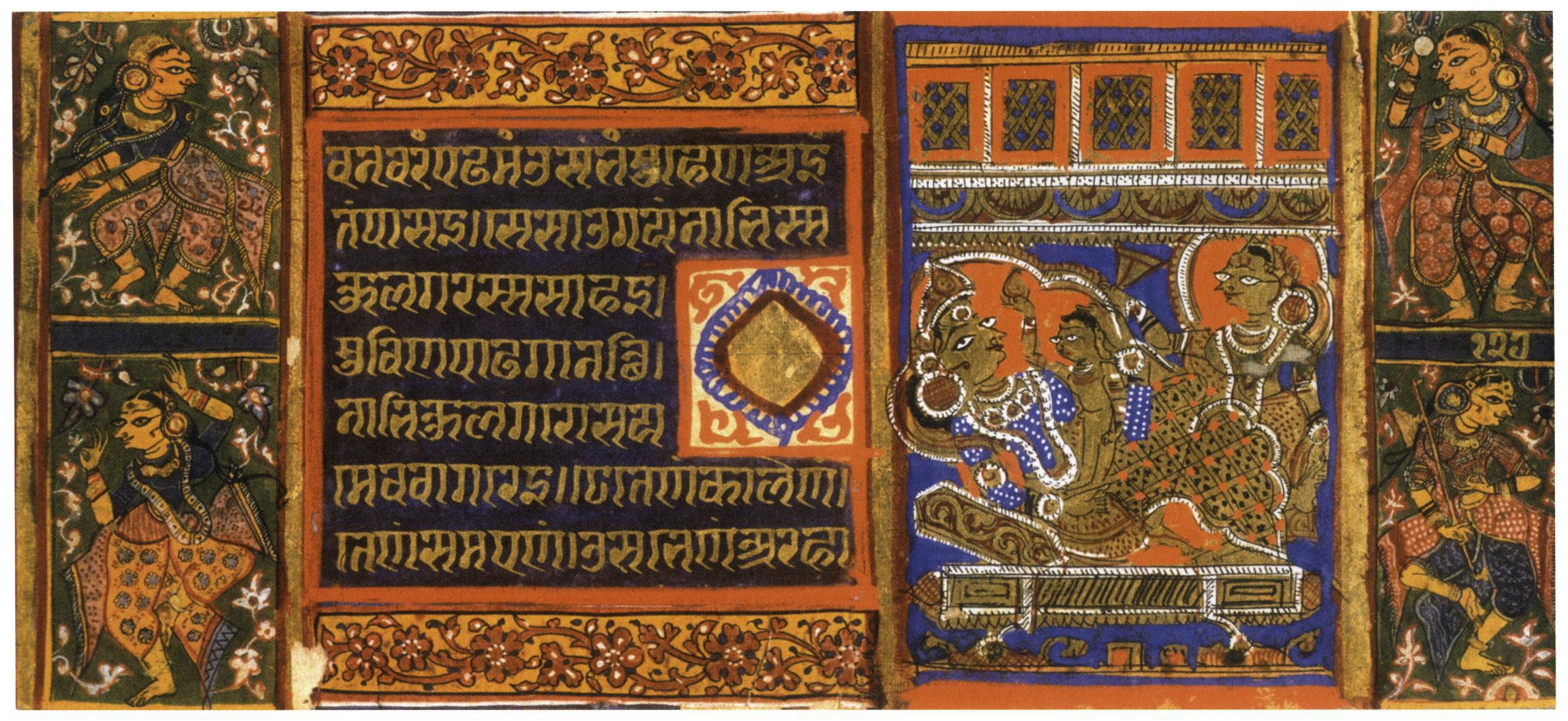
Birth of the Tirthankara Rishabha, folio from the Devasano Pado Kalpasutra, Kalpasutra and Kalakacharya Katha. Gujarat, c. 1500. Bharat Kala Bhavan

Rishabhanatha (Devanagari: ऋषभनाथ), also known as Rishabhadeva (Devanagari: ऋषभदेव, Ṛṣabhadeva), Rishabha (Devanagari: ऋषभ, Ṛṣabha) or Ikshvaku (Devanagari: इक्ष्वाकु, Ikṣvāku), is the legendary first tirthankara (Supreme preacher) of Jainism. He was the first of twenty-four teachers in the present half-cycle of time in Jain cosmology and is called a "ford maker" because his teachings helped one cross the sea of interminable rebirths and deaths. He was the spiritual successor of Sampratti Bhagwan, the last Tirthankara of the previous time cycle. He is also known as Ādinātha (lit. 'first Lord'), as well as Aadishvara (first Jina), Yugadideva (first deva of the yuga), Prathamarajeshwara (first God-king) and Nabheya (son of Nabhi). He is also known as Ikshvaku, establisher of the Ikshvaku dynasty. He attracts most devotional worship among Jains long with Mahavira, Parshvanatha, Neminatha and Shantinatha. He is regarded as the father of human civilization. He organized the human society into three occupation based proto-groups namely kshatriya (rulers), aryya (merchants and traders) and sukshma (specialized skilled workers). His son Bharata Chakravarti became the first kshatriya and the universal monarch after whom India was named Bhāratavarsha or Bhārat.Hinduism’s Bhagavata Purana claim him as an avatar of Vishnu. Jains consider him as an entirely distinct, fully enlightened human being who attained salvation. Rishabhanatha is one of the five Tirthankaras that attract the most devotional worship among the Jains.

According to traditional accounts, many millions of years ago, he was born to king Nabhi and queen Marudevi in the north Indian city of Ayodhya, also called Vinita. He had two wives, Sumangalā and Sunandā. Sumangalā is described as the mother of his ninety-nine sons (including Bharata) and one daughter, Brahmi. Sunandā is depicted as the mother of Bahubali and Sundari. The sudden death of Nilanjana, one of the dancers sent by Indra to perform in his courtroom, reminded him of the world's transitory nature, and he developed a desire for renunciation.

After his renunciation, the legends as described in major Jain texts such as Hemachandra's Trishashti-Shalakapurusha-Charitra and Adinathcharitra written by Acharya Vardhamansuri states that Rishabhanatha travelled without food for 400 days. The day on which he got his first ahara (food) is celebrated by Jains as Akshaya Tritiya. In devotion to Rishabhanatha, Śvetāmbara Jains perform a 400-day-long fast, in which they consume food on alternating days. This religious practice is known as Varshitap. The fast is broken on Akshaya Tritiya. He attained Moksha on Mount Ashtapada. The text Adi Purana by Jinasena, Aadesvarcharitra within the Trishashti-Shalakapurusha-Charitra by Hemachandra are accounts of the events of his life and teachings. His iconography includes ancient idols such as at Kulpak Tirth and Palitana temples as well as colossal statues such as Statue of Ahimsa, Bawangaja and those erected in Gopachal hill. His icons include the eponymous bull as his emblem, the Nyagrodha tree, Gomukha (bull-faced) Yaksha, and Chakreshvari Yakshi.

== Early life ==
Rishabhanatha is known by many names including Adinatha, Aadishwara, Yugadeva and Nabheya. Ādi purāṇa, a major Jain text records the life accounts of Rishabhanatha as well as ten previous incarnations according to the Digambara tradition. For Rishabhanatha's biography in accordance with the Śvetāmbara tradition is found in several texts such as Hemachandra's Trishashti-Shalakapurusha-Charitra and Adinathcharitra written by Acharya Vardhamansuri. Jain tradition associates the life of a tirthankara to five auspicious events called the pancha kalyanaka. These include garbha (mother's pregnancy), janma (birth), diksha (initiation), kevalyagyana (omniscience) and moksha (liberation).

According to Jain cosmology, the universe does not have a temporal beginning or end. Its "Universal History" divides the cycle of time into two halves (avasarpiṇī and utsarpiṇī) with six aras (spokes) in each half, and the cycles keep repeating perpetually. Twenty-four Tirthankaras appear in every half, the first Tirthankara founding Jainism each time after the destruction of dharma at the end of each half cycle of time. This is similar to, but not completely the same as the idea of destruction of dharma at the end of Kali Yuga in Hindu mythology. In the present time cycle, Rishabhanatha is credited as being the first tīrthaṅkara. Usually, all the tīrthaṅkaras are born in the fourth spoke of the half cycle. However, Rishabhanatha is an exception as he was born at the end of the third half (known as sukhamā-dukhamā erā).

Rishabhanatha is said to be the founder of Jainism in the present Avsarpini (a time cycle) by all sub-traditions and sects of Jainism. Jain chronology places Rishabhanatha in historical terms, as someone who lived millions of years ago. He is believed to have been born 10^{224} years ago and lived for a span of 8,400,000 purva (592.704 × 10^{18} years). His height is described in the Jain texts to be 500 bows (1312 ells), or about 4920 feet/1500 meters. Such descriptions of non-human heights and age are also found for the next 21 Tirthankaras in Jain texts and according to Kristi Wiley – a scholar at University of California Berkeley known for her publications on Jainism. Most Indologists and scholars consider all the first 22 of 24 Tirthankaras to be prehistorical, or historical and a part of Jain mythology. However, among Jain writers and some Indian scholars, some of the first 22 Tirthankaras are considered to reflect historical figures, with a few conceding that the inflated biographical statistics are mythical.

According to Sarvepalli Radhakrishnan, a professor of comparative religions and philosophy at Oxford who later became the second President of India, there is evidence to show that Rishabhdeva was being worshipped by the first century BCE. The Yajurveda (Note: A non-Jain, Hindu text) mentions the names of three Tirthankaras – Rishabha, Ajitanatha and Arishtanemi, states Radhakrishnan, and "the Bhāgavata Purāṇa endorses the view that Rishabha was the founder of Jainism".

=== Birth ===
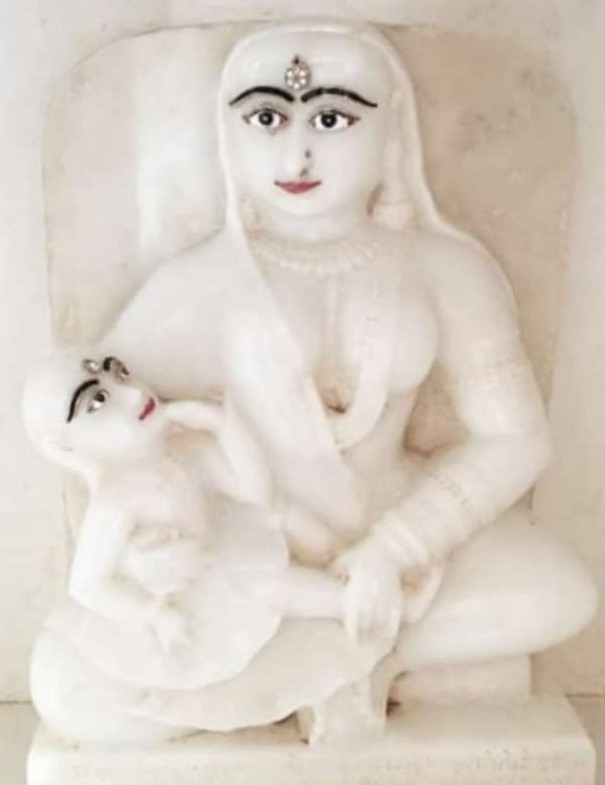
An idol of Rishabha with mother Marudevi at Palitana

Rishabhanatha was born to Nabhi and Marudevi, the king and queen of Ayodhya, on the ninth day of the dark half of the month of Chaitra (caitra krişna navamĩ). His association to Ayodhya makes it a sacred town for Jains, as it is in Hinduism for the birth of Rama. In Jain tradition, the birth of a tirthankara is marked by 14 auspicious dreams of the mother. These are believed to have been seen by Marudevi on the second day of Ashadha (a month of the Jain calendar) krishna (the new moon). The dreams signified the birth of a chakravartin or a tirthankara, according to the supposed explanation by Indra to Marudevi.

=== Marriage and children ===
Rishabhanatha is believed to have had two wives, Sunanda and Sumangala. Sumangala is claimed to be the mother of ninety-nine sons (including Bharata) and one daughter, Brahmi. Sunanda is believed to be the mother of Bahubali and Sundari. Jain texts state that Rishabhanatha taught his daughters Brahmi and Sundari, Brahmi script and the science of numbers (Ank-Vidya) respectively. The Pannavana Sutra (2nd century BCE) and the Samavayanga Sutra (3rd century BCE) of the aagams followed by the Śvetāmbaras list many other writing scripts known to the ancient Jain tradition, of which the Brahmi script named after Rishabha's daughter tops the list. His eldest son, Bharata, is stated to have ruled ancient India from his capital of Ayodhya. He is described as a just and kind ruler in Jain texts, who was not attached to wealth or vices.

== Rule, administration and teachings ==
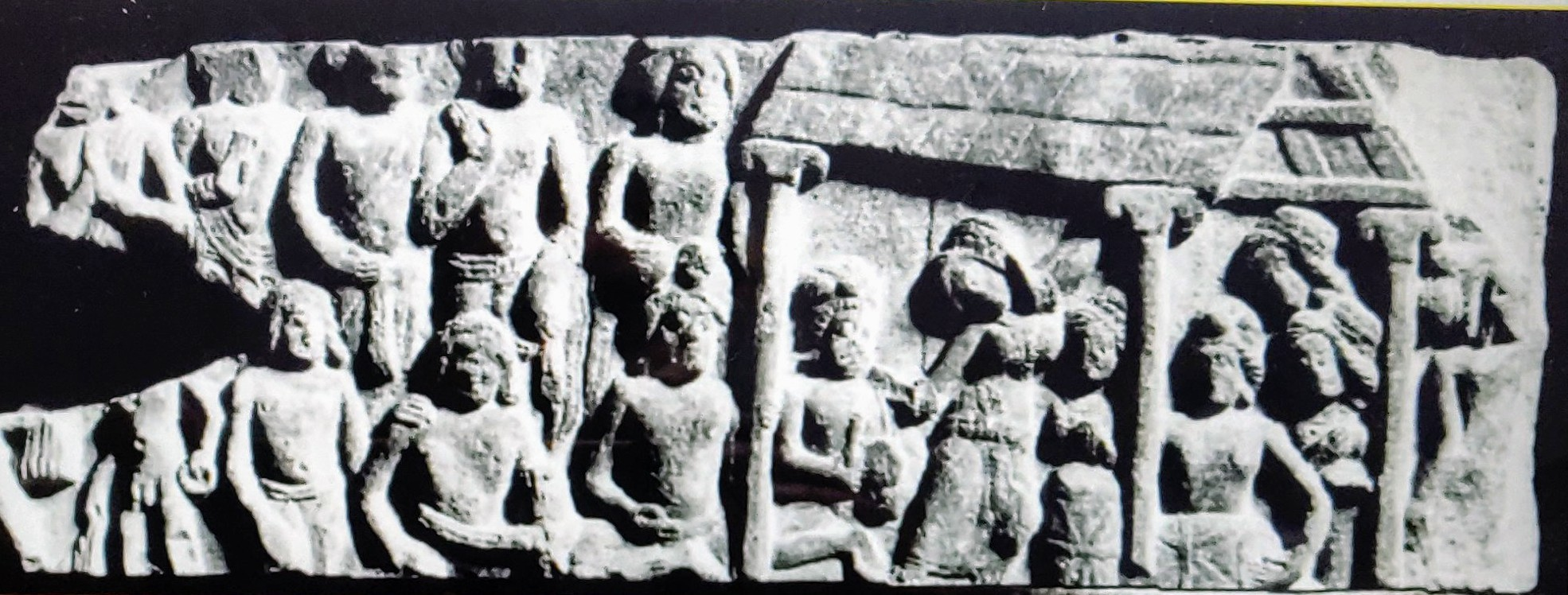
Ruins of ancient Jain settlement from 2nd century BCE in Kankali Tila, Mathura depicting the scene of Nilanjana's Dance from life of Rishabhdeva.

Rishabhanatha was born in bhoga-bhumi or the age of omnipresent happiness. It is further suggested that no one had to work because of miraculous wish-fulfilling trees called the kalpavrikshas. It is stated that people approached the king for help due to decreased efficacy of the trees with passage of time. Rishabhanatha is then said to have taught them six main professions. These were: (1) Asi (swordsmanship for protection), (2) Masi (writing skills), (3) Krishi (agriculture), (4) Vidya (knowledge), (5) Vanijya (trade and commerce) and (6) Shilp (crafts). In other words, he is credited with introducing karma-bhumi (the age of action) by founding arts and professions to enable householders to sustain themselves. Rishabhanatha is credited in Jainism to have invented and taught fire, cooking and all the skills needed for human beings to live. In total, Rishabhanatha is said to have taught seventy-two sciences to men and sixty-four to women. The institution of marriage is stated to have come into existence after his marriage to Sunanda marked the precedence. According to Paul Dundas, Rishabhanatha, in Jainism, is thus not merely a spiritual teacher, but the one who founded knowledge in its various forms. He is depicted as a form of culture hero for the current cosmological cycle.

Traditional sources state that Rishabhanatha was the first king who established his capital at Vinitanagara (Ayodhya). He is claimed to have given first laws for governance by a king. He is said to have established the three-fold varna system based on professions consisting of kshatriyas (warriors), vaishyas (merchants) and shudras (artisans). Bharata is said to have added the fourth varna, brahmin to the system.

== Renunciation ==
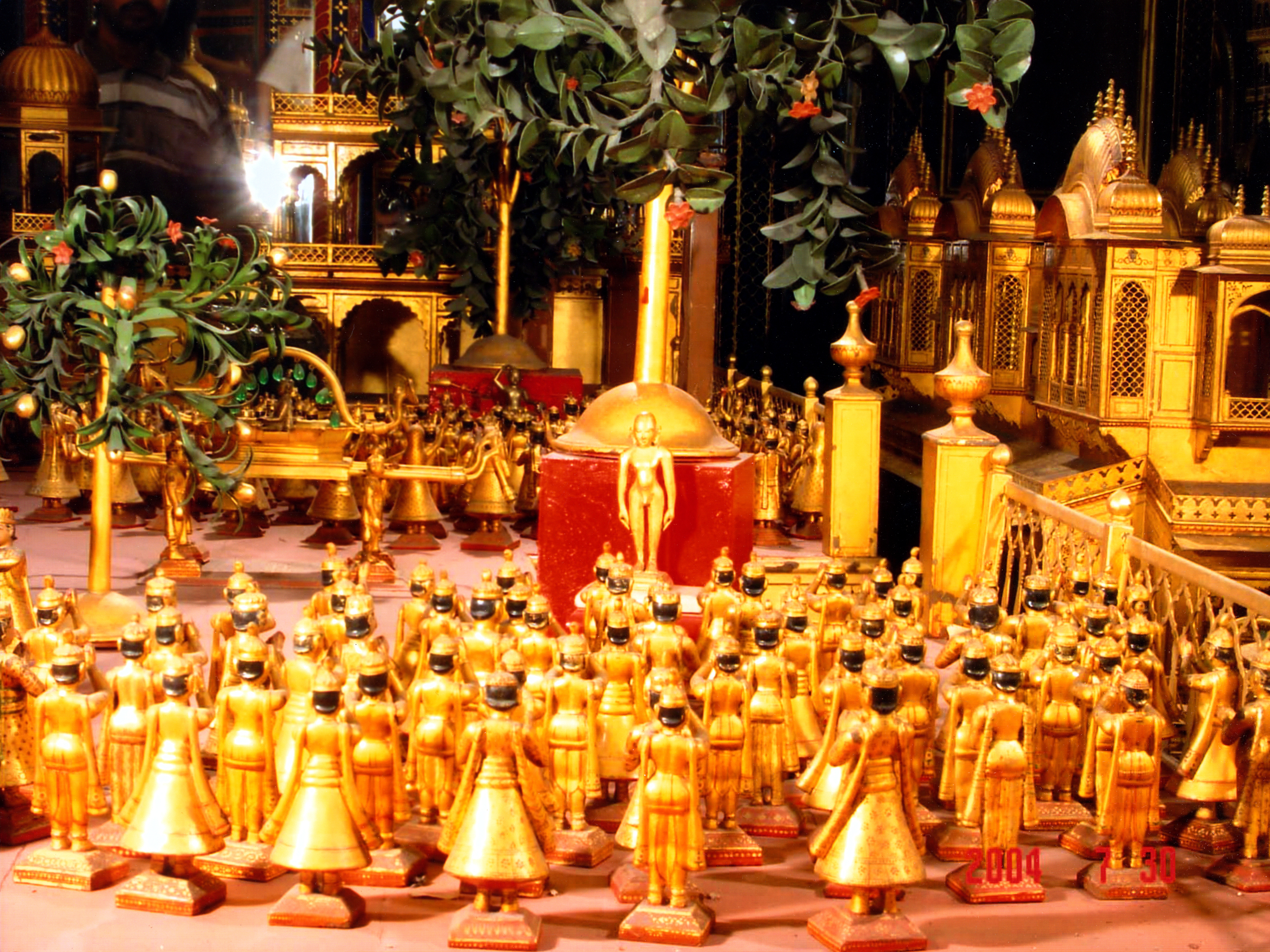
Statuary representing meditation by Rishabhanatha in Kayotsarga posture. (Photo:Ajmer Jain temple)

Jain legends talk about a dance of celestial dancers organised in Rishabhanatha's royal assembly hall by Indra, the heavenly-king of the first heaven. Nilanjana, one of the dancers, is said to have died in midst of the series of vigorous dance movements. The sudden death of Nilanjana is said to have reminded Rishabhanatha of the world's transitory nature, triggering him to renounce his kingdom, family and material wealth. This dance incident is found in 100 BCE images found in Kankali Tila. He is then believed to have distributed his kingdom among his hundred sons. Bharata supposedly got the city of Ayodhya and Bahubali is believed to have got the city of Taxila and the kingdom of Gandhara (as per the Śvetāmbara tradition) or Podanapur (as per the Digambara tradition). He is believed to have become a monk in Siddharta-garden, in the outskirts of Ayodhya, under Ashoka tree on the ninth day of the month of Chaitra Krishna (Hindu calendar). Tirthankaras usually tear out five handfuls of their hair at initiation. Śvetāmbara text Trisasti-salaka-purusa-caritra mentions Rishabhanatha tore only four handfuls of his hair. Just as the moment he was about to pull and tear a fifth handful, Indra requested him not to do so, because the remaining hair 'shone like emerald on his golden soulders'.

== Akshaya Tritiya ==
Jains believe that people did not know the procedure to offer food to a monk, since Rishabhanatha was the first one. His great-grandson, Shreyansa, a king of Gajapura (now Hastinapur) after recalling his previous birth in which he had offered food to a Jain monk keeping in mind all the dietary restrictions and preparing it to be free from all faults, offered him sugarcane juice (ikshu-rasa) with required procedure to break 400-days-long fast. Jains celebrate the event as Akshaya tritiya every year on the third day of the bright fortnight of the month Vaishaka (usually April). It is believed to be the starting of the ritual of ahara-daana (food offerings) from layperson to mendicants.

== Omniscience ==
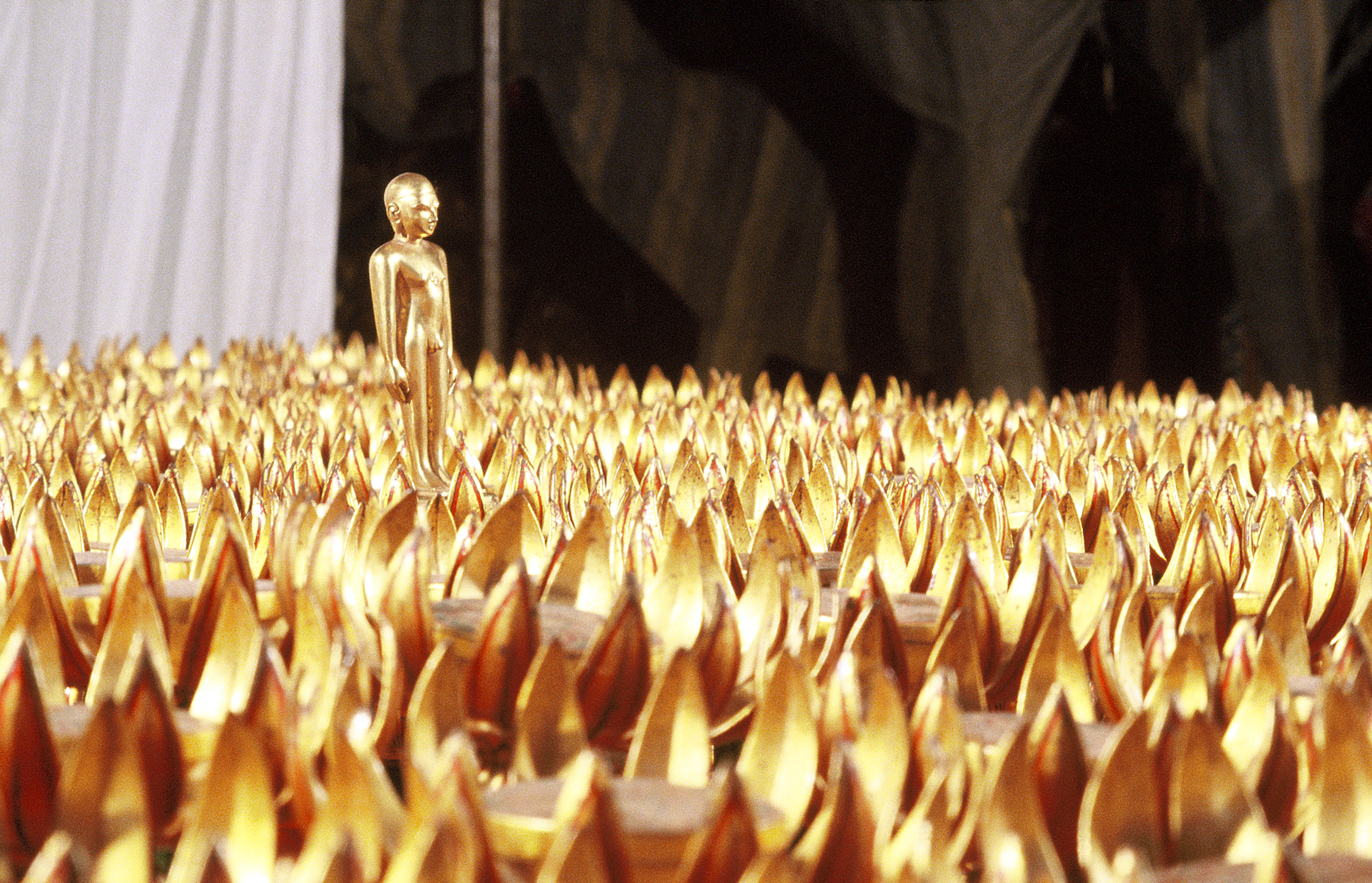
Rishabhanatha's moving over lotus after attaining omniscience

Rishabhanatha is said to have spent a thousand years performing austerities before attaining kevala jnana (omniscience) under Akshayavata in the town of Purimatala on the 11th day of falgun-krishna (a month in traditional calendar) after destroying all four of his ghati-karma. The Devas (heavenly beings) are suggested to have created divine preaching halls known as samavasaranas for him after that. He is believed to have given the five major vows for monks and 12 minor vows for laity. He is believed to have established the sangha (four-fold religious order) consisting of male and female mendicants and disciples. His religious order is mentioned in Kalpa Sutra to have consisted of 84,000 sadhus (male monks) and 3,000,000 sadhvis (female monks).

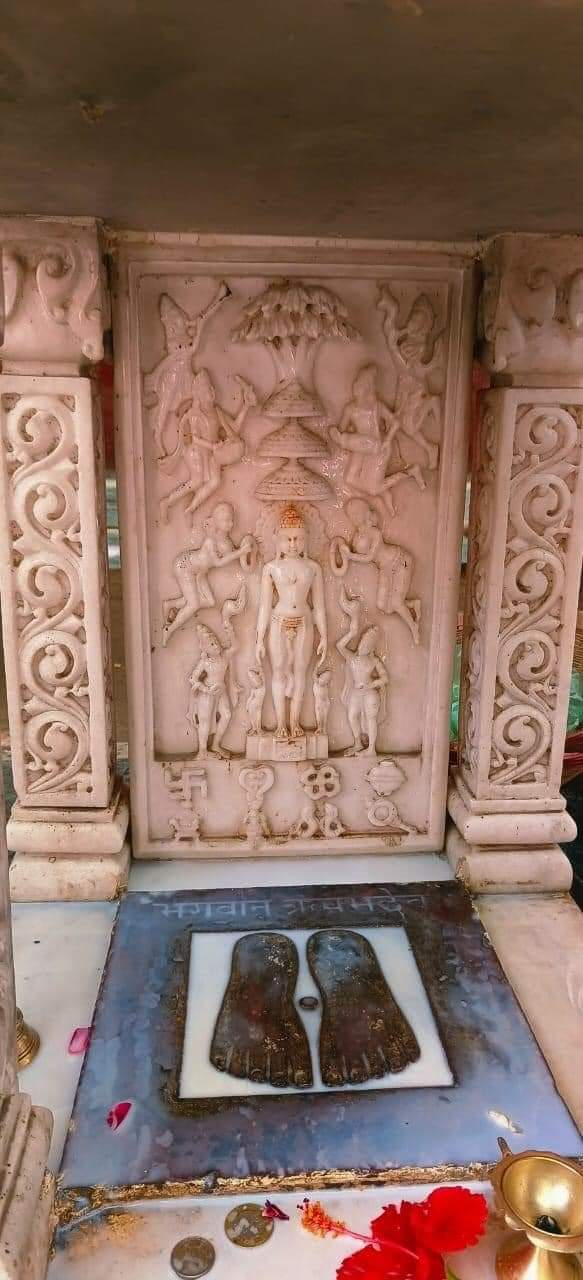
Ancient footprints of lord Rishabha commemorating the place of his Omniscience

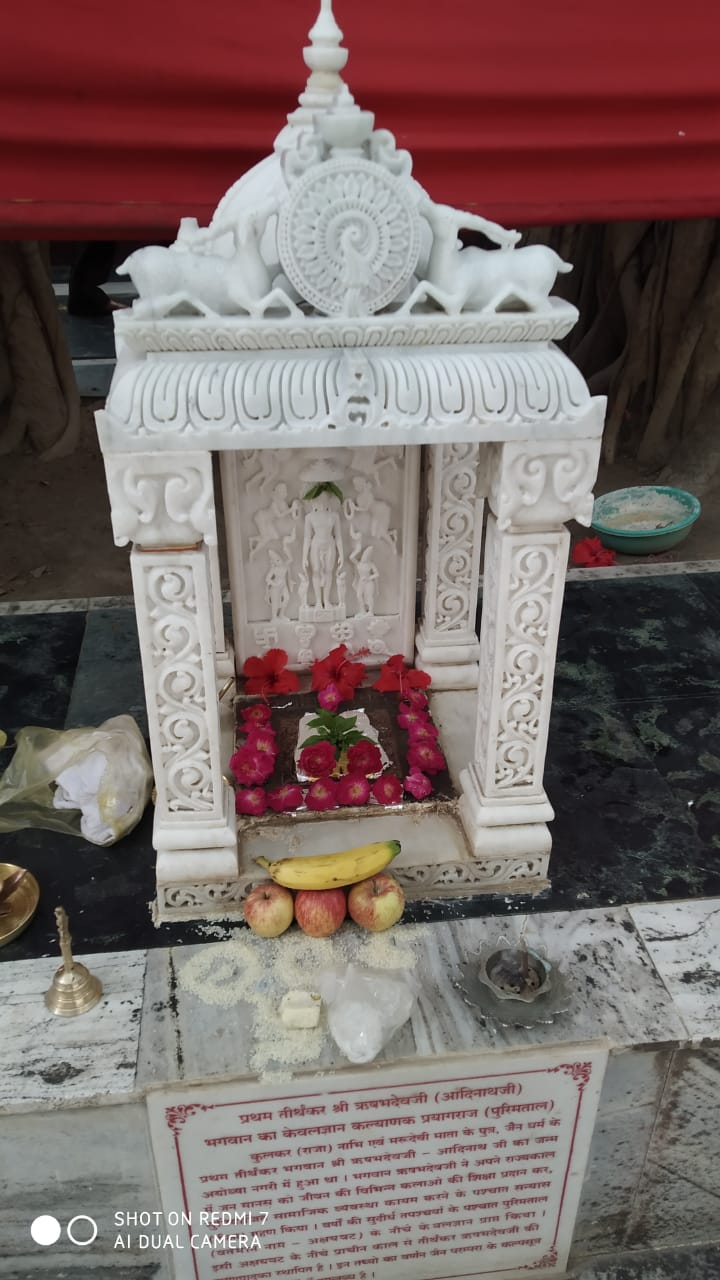
New shrine built to protect the ancient footprints

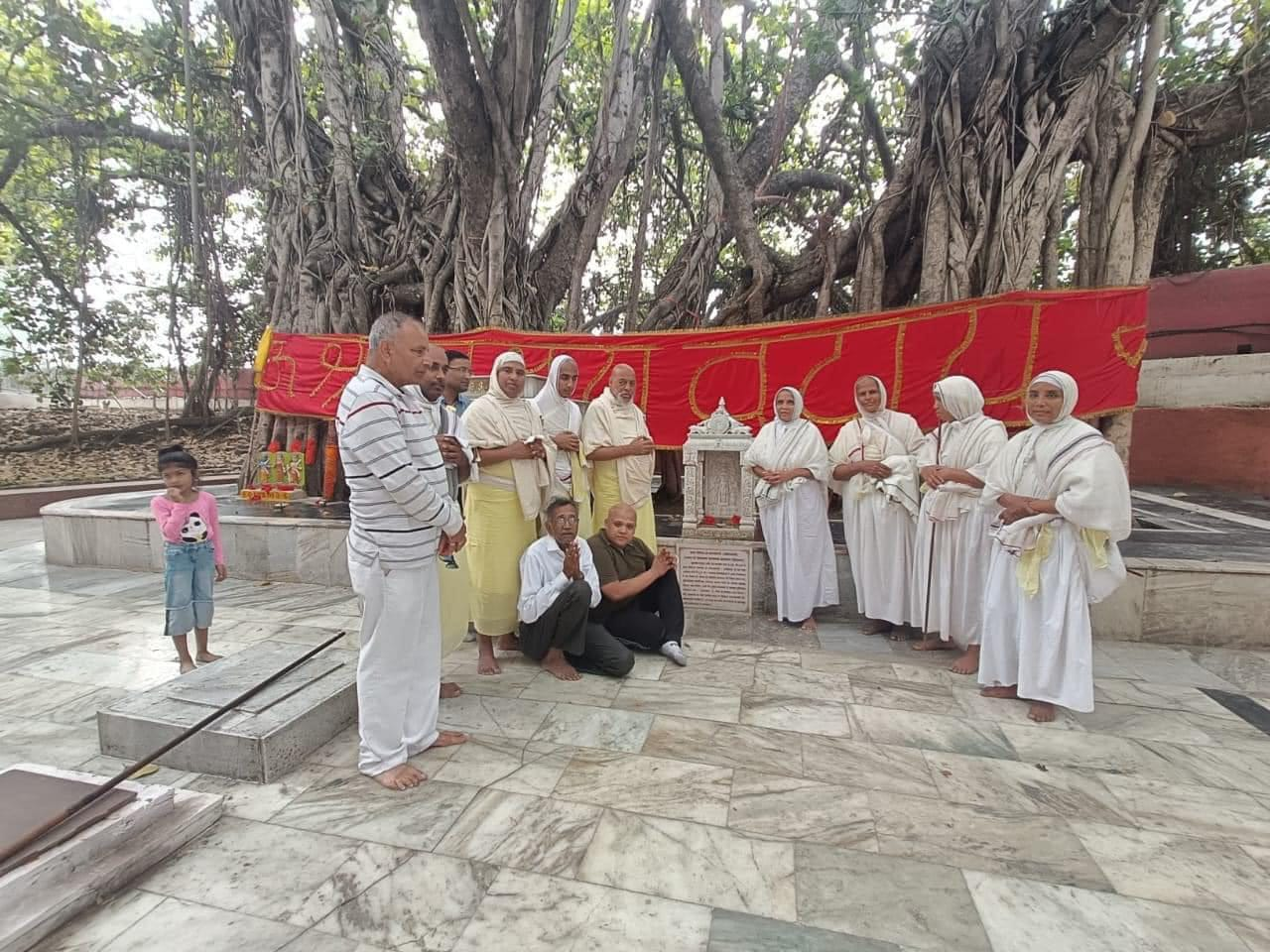
Jaina monks & devotees paying homage to the lord Rishabha

== Nirvana ==
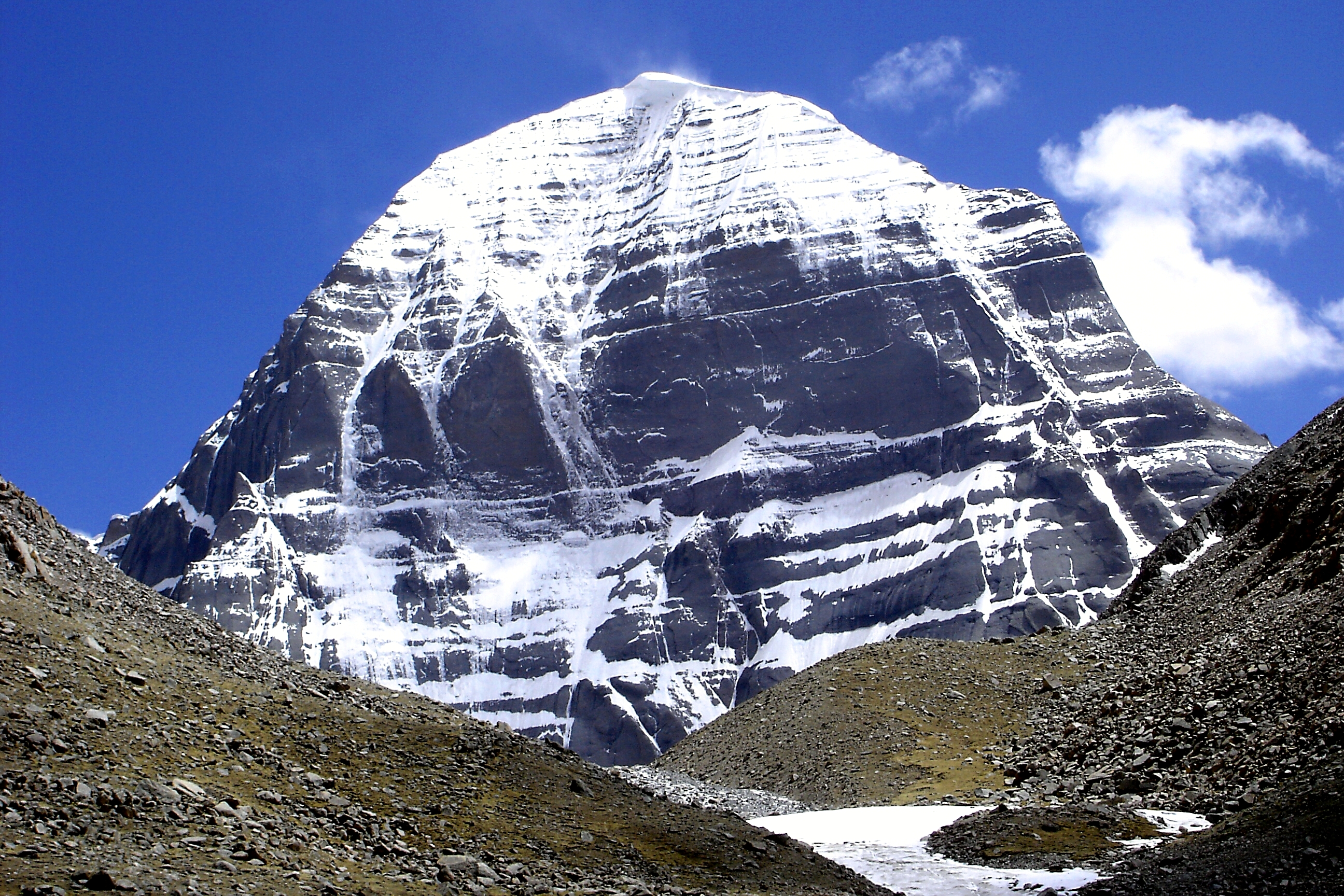
Mount Kailash or Ashtapad, the Nirvana place of Rishabhdeva.

Rishabhanatha is said to have preached the principles of Jainism far and wide. He is suggested to have attained Nirvana or moksha, destroying all four of his aghati-karma. This is marked as liberation of his soul from the endless cycle of rebirths to stay eternally at siddhaloka. His death is believed in Jainism to have occurred on Ashtapada (also known as Mount Kailash) on the fourteenth day of Magha Krishna (Hindu Calendar). His total age at that time is suggested to be 84 lakh purva years, with three years and eight and a half months remaining of the third era. According to medieval era Jain texts, Rishabhanatha performed asceticism for millions of years, then returned to Ashtapada where he fasted and performing inner meditation to his moksha. They further state that Indra came with his fellow gods from the heavens after that, to perform rituals of the place from where Rishabhanatha attained moksha.

Rishabhanatha's successor, Ajitanatha, is said to have been born 50 lakh crore sagara after him.

== In literature ==
The Ādi purāṇa, a 9th-century Sanskrit poem, and a 10th-century Kannada language commentary on it by the poet Adikavi Pampa (fl. 941 CE), written in Champu style, a mix of prose and verse and spread over sixteen cantos, deals with the ten lives of Rishabhanatha and his two sons. In 11th century, Śvetāmbara monk Acharya Vardhamansuri wrote Adinathcharit, an 11000-verse-long biography of Rishabhanatha in Prakrit. The life of Lord Rishabhanatha is also detailed in Mahapurana of Jinasena, Trisasti-salaka-purusa-caritra by the Śvetāmbara monk Acharya Hemachandra, Kalpa Sutra (a Śvetāmbara Jain text written by Bhadrabāhu that contains the biographies of some of the Tirthankaras), and Jambudvipa-prajnapti. Bhaktamara Stotra by Acharya Manatunga is one of the most prominent prayers mentioning Rishabhanatha. There is mention of Rishabha in Hindu texts, such as in the Rigveda, Vishnu Purana and Bhagavata Purana (in 5th canto). In later texts, such as the Bhagavata Purana, he is described as an avatar of Vishnu, a great sage, known for his learning and austerities. Rishabhanatha is also mentioned in Buddhist literature. It speaks of several tirthankara and includes Rishabhanatha along with: Padmaprabha, Chandraprabha, Pushpadanta, Vimalanatha, Dharmanatha, and Neminatha. A Buddhist scripture named Dharmottarapradipa mentions Rishabhanatha as an Apta (Tirthankara).

== Iconography ==
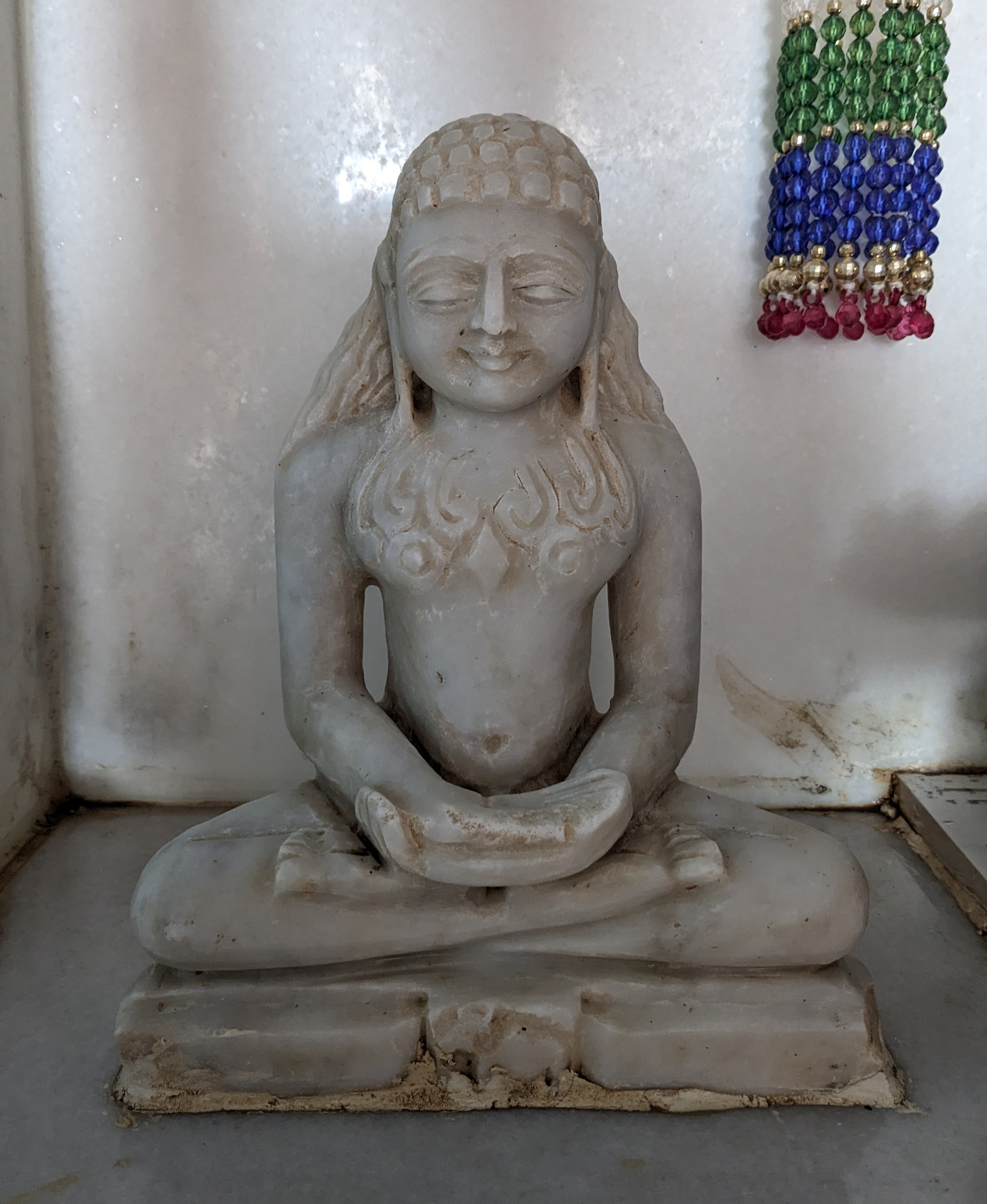
Rishabhanatha in meditation, depicted with long matted hair signifying his penance on Mount Kailash; Hoysala period sculpture from Halebidu, Karnataka.

Rishabhanatha is usually depicted in the lotus position or kayotsarga, a standing posture of meditation. The distinguishing features of Rishabhanatha are his long locks of hair which fall on his shoulders, and an image of a bull in sculptures of him. In accordance with the Śvetāmbara tradition, almost all idols depicting Rishabhanatha have hairlocks on both his shoulders, in accordance with the mention of a loch (tearing out of hair) with four handfuls instead of the normal five handfuls in Trisasti-salaka-purusa-caritra, which makes his iconography distinctive from other Tirthankaras'. Most of his iconography as per the beliefs of the Śvetāmbara tradition can be found at Palitana temples. Paintings of him usually depict legendary events of his life. Some of these include his marriage, and Indra performing a ritual known as abhisheka (consecration). He is sometimes shown presenting a bowl to his followers and teaching them the art of pottery, painting a house, or weaving textiles. The visit of his mother Marudevi is also shown extensively in painting. He is also associated with his Bull emblem, the Nyagrodha tree, Gomukha (bull-faced) Yaksha, and Chakreshvari Yakshi.

=== Ancient idols ===
Rishabhanatha's distinctive hairlocks have been depicted in first-century CE stone sculptures excavated in Mathura. Furthermore, he is prominently featured in the Chausa hoard in Bihar, which contains the oldest known Jain bronzes in India, dating between the Shunga and Gupta periods. Because these early bronze artifacts were cast before the widespread adoption of specific pedestal emblems (lañchanas), Rishabhanatha is one of the only tirthankaras definitively identifiable within the hoard due to the presence of his characteristic shoulder locks.

Archaeological evidence of his continued veneration was also recovered from the Akota hoard in Gujarat. Documented extensively by art historian Umakant Premanand Shah, this excavation yielded a highly preserved bronze idol of Rishabhanatha. Historical inscriptions indicate this specific bronze was installed by Jinabhadra Gani Kshamashramana, a Jain ascetic, providing crucial evidence of advanced post-Gupta era metallurgical artistry.

Further medieval artifacts were discovered in the Vasantgarh hoard in Rajasthan. Dating from the 7th to the 11th centuries CE, this collection includes bronze idols of Rishabhanatha that highlight the regional evolution of western Indian metallurgy. Another major archaeological discovery is the Hansi hoard, excavated from the Asigarh Fort in Haryana. Dating to the 8th and 9th centuries CE, this collection features several bronze idols of Rishabhanatha seated in a meditative posture. Additionally, 11th-century Digambara bronzes were recovered from the Aluara hoard near Dhanbad, Jharkhand. Currently preserved at the Patna Museum, this hoard contains metallic representations of Rishabhanatha that demonstrate the continuous geographical spread of his veneration.

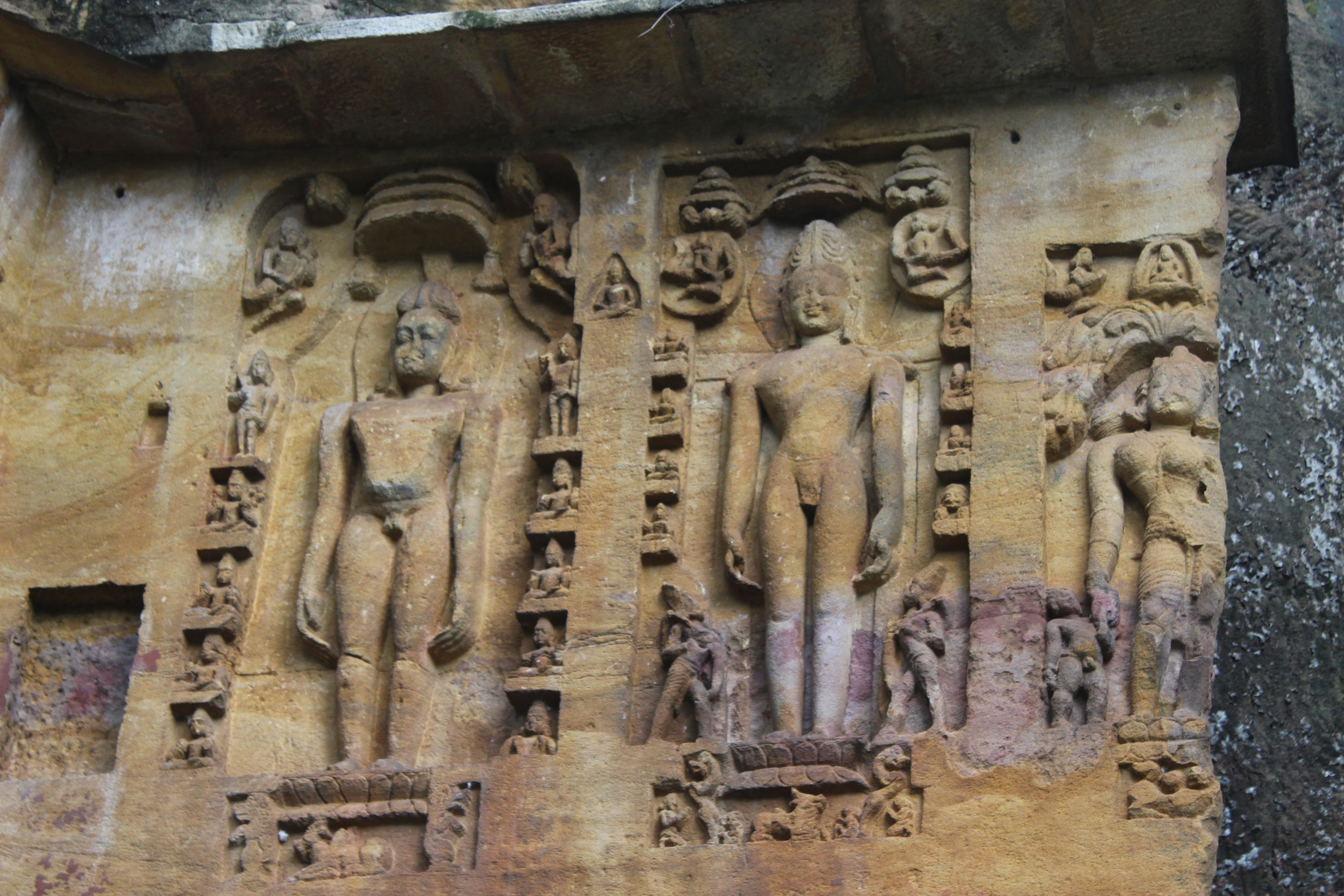
Carving at Ambika Gumpha, Udayagiri and Khandagiri Caves, 2nd century BCE

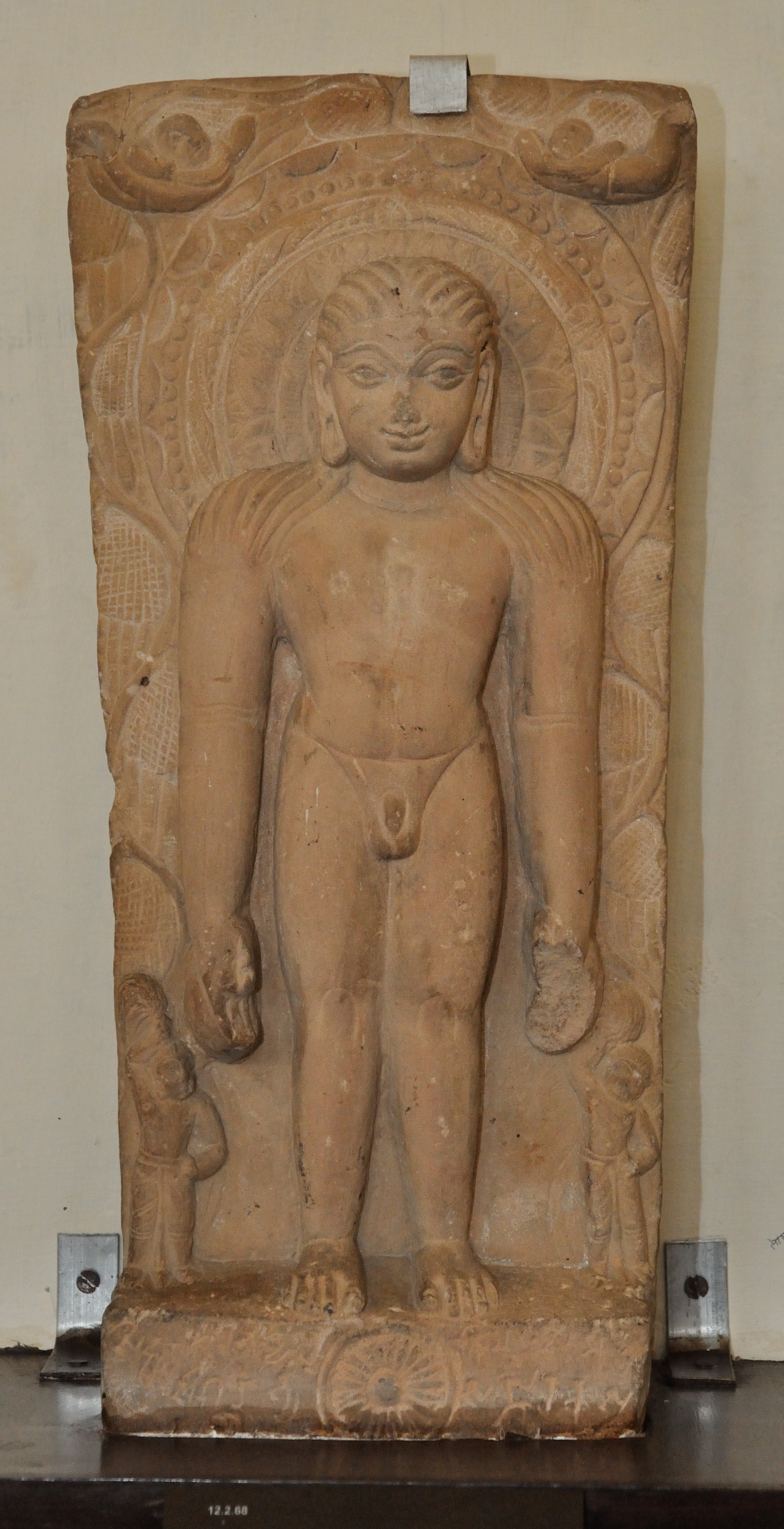
6th century idol escavated from Kankali Tila

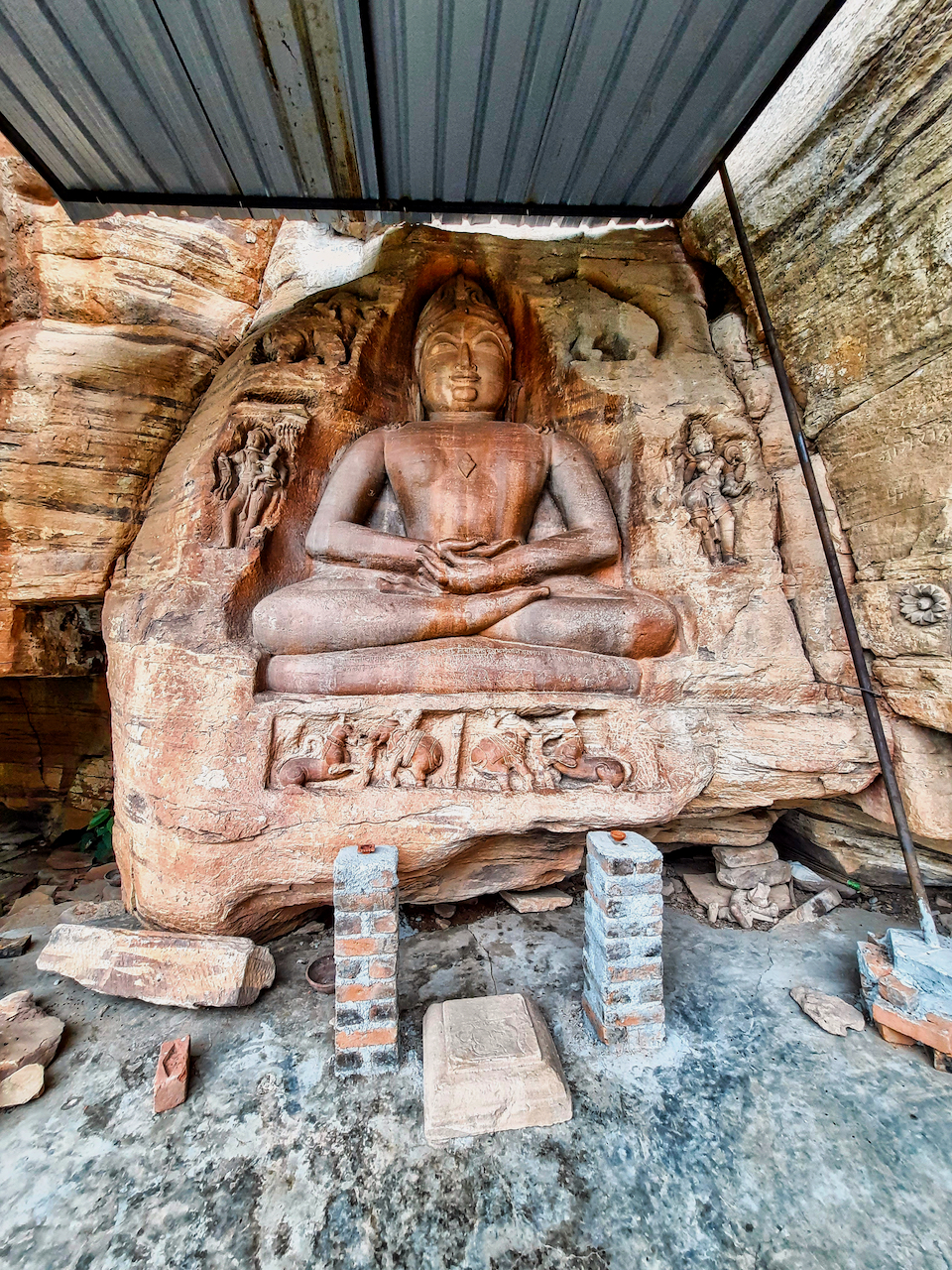
10th century, Rakhetra caves

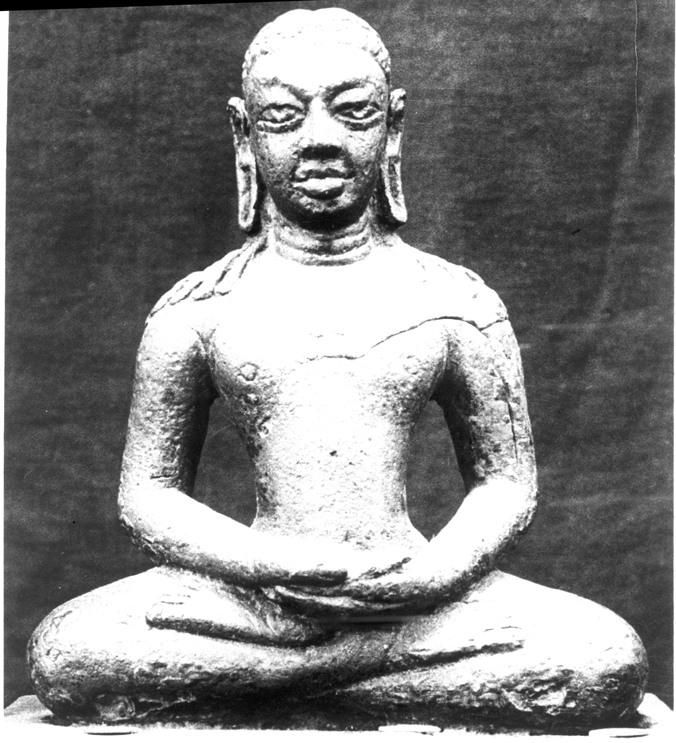
Rishabhanatha Bronze from Chausa, Bihar, dating from 7th century

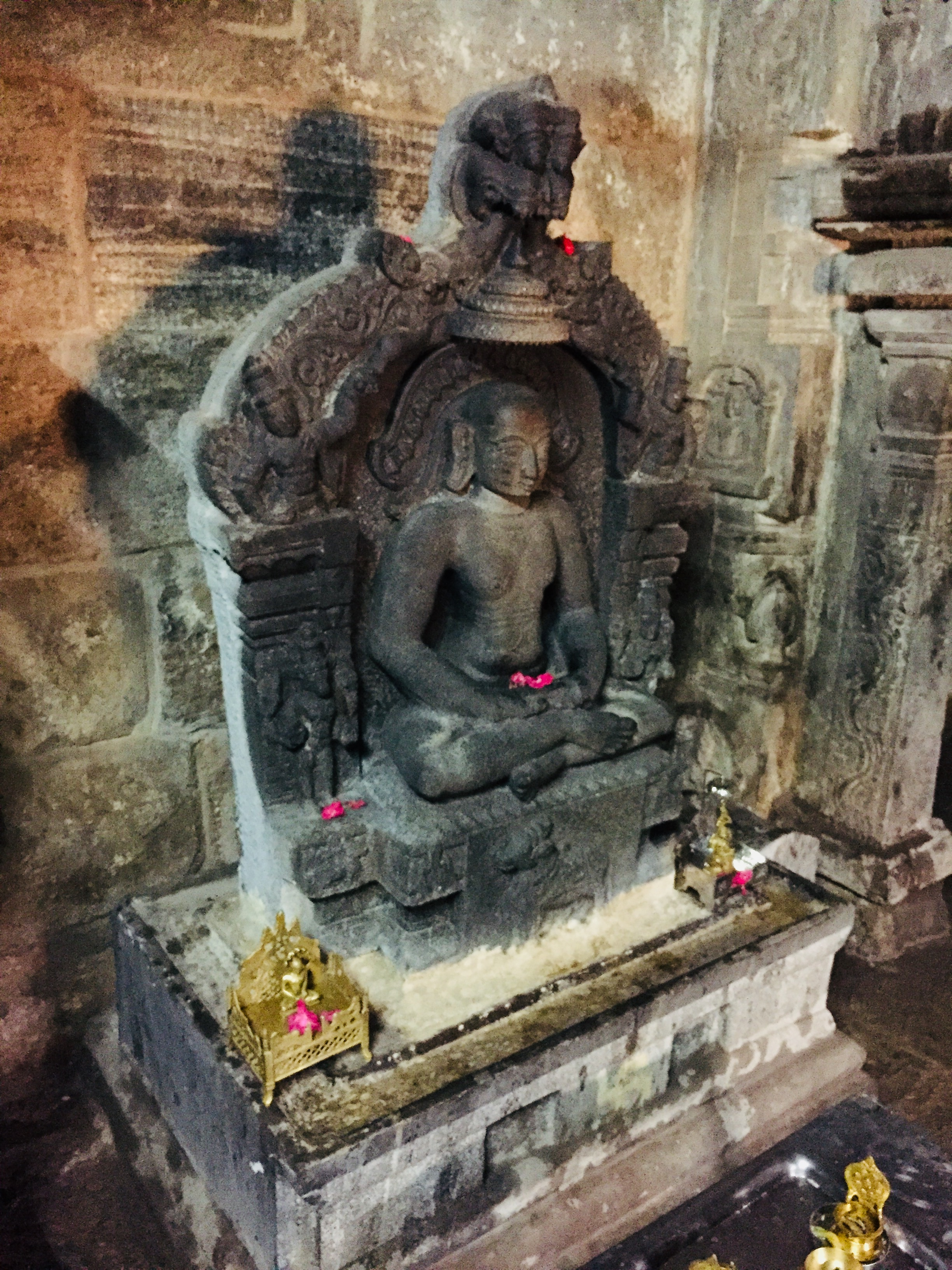
7th century idol at Vijayamangalam Jain temple

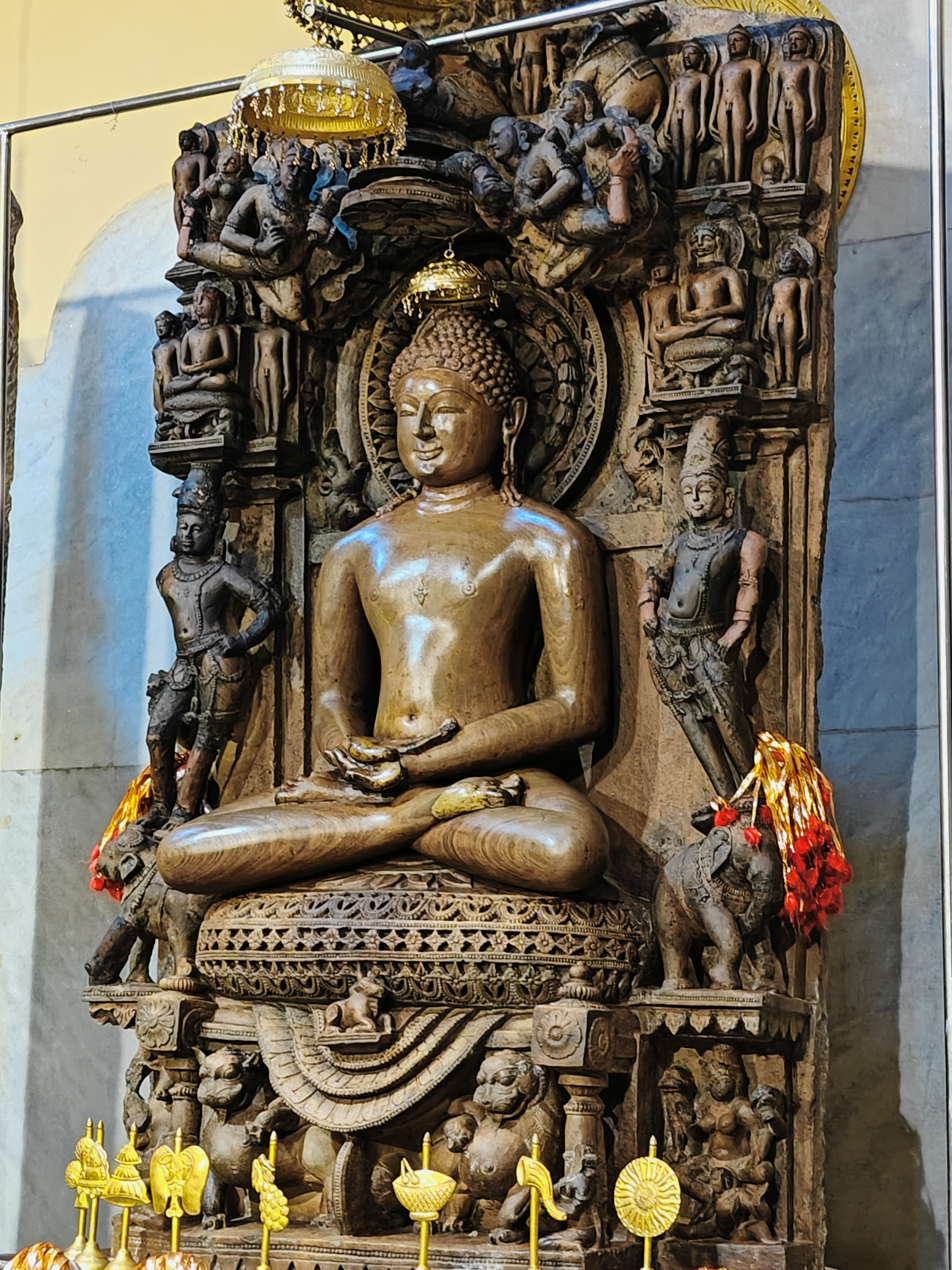
Idol at Golakot Jain temple

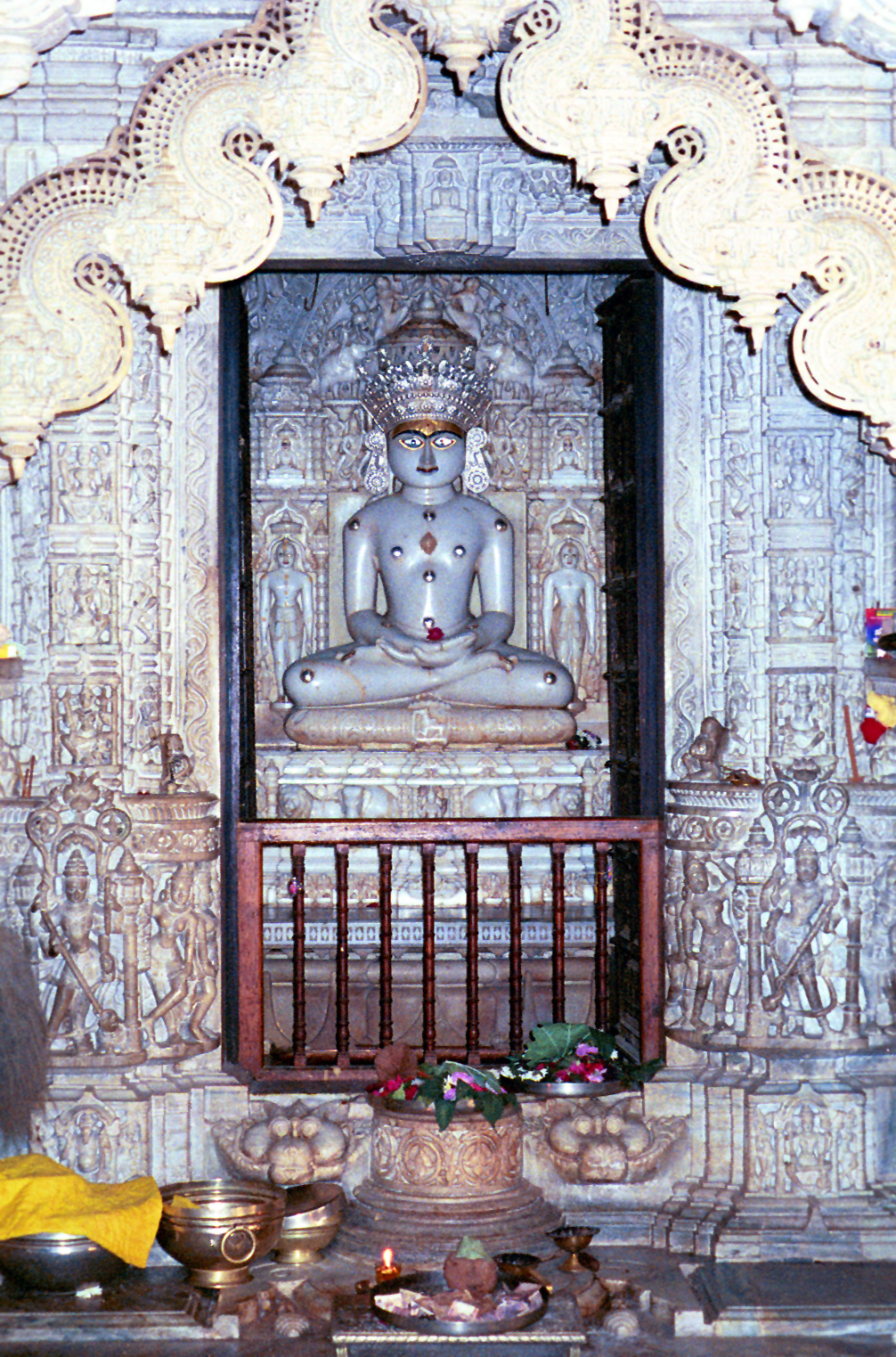
Ranakpur Jain Temple, Rajasthan

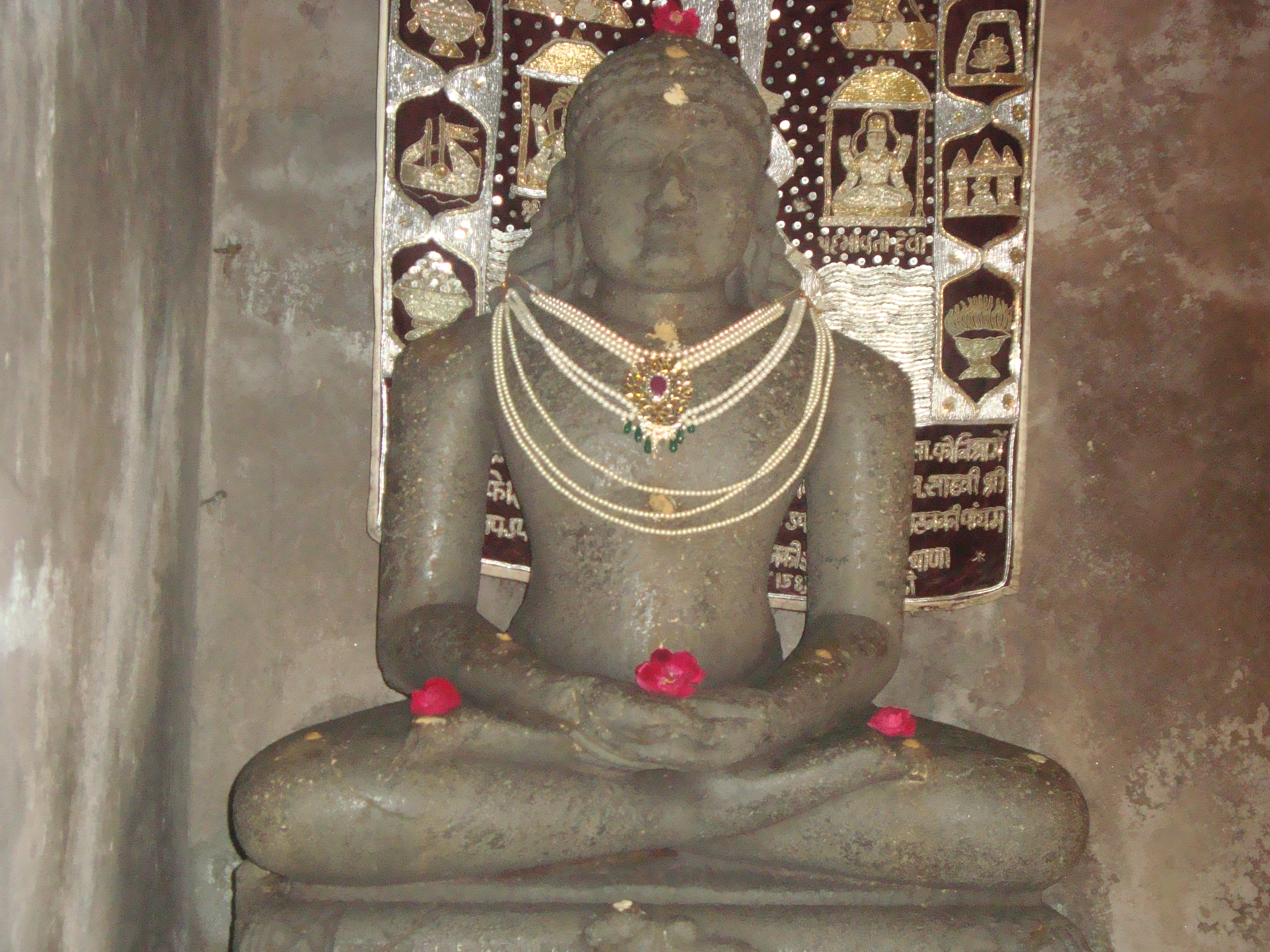
Idol of Rishabhanatha Decorated with Flowers & Ornaments as per Śvetāmbara Rituals

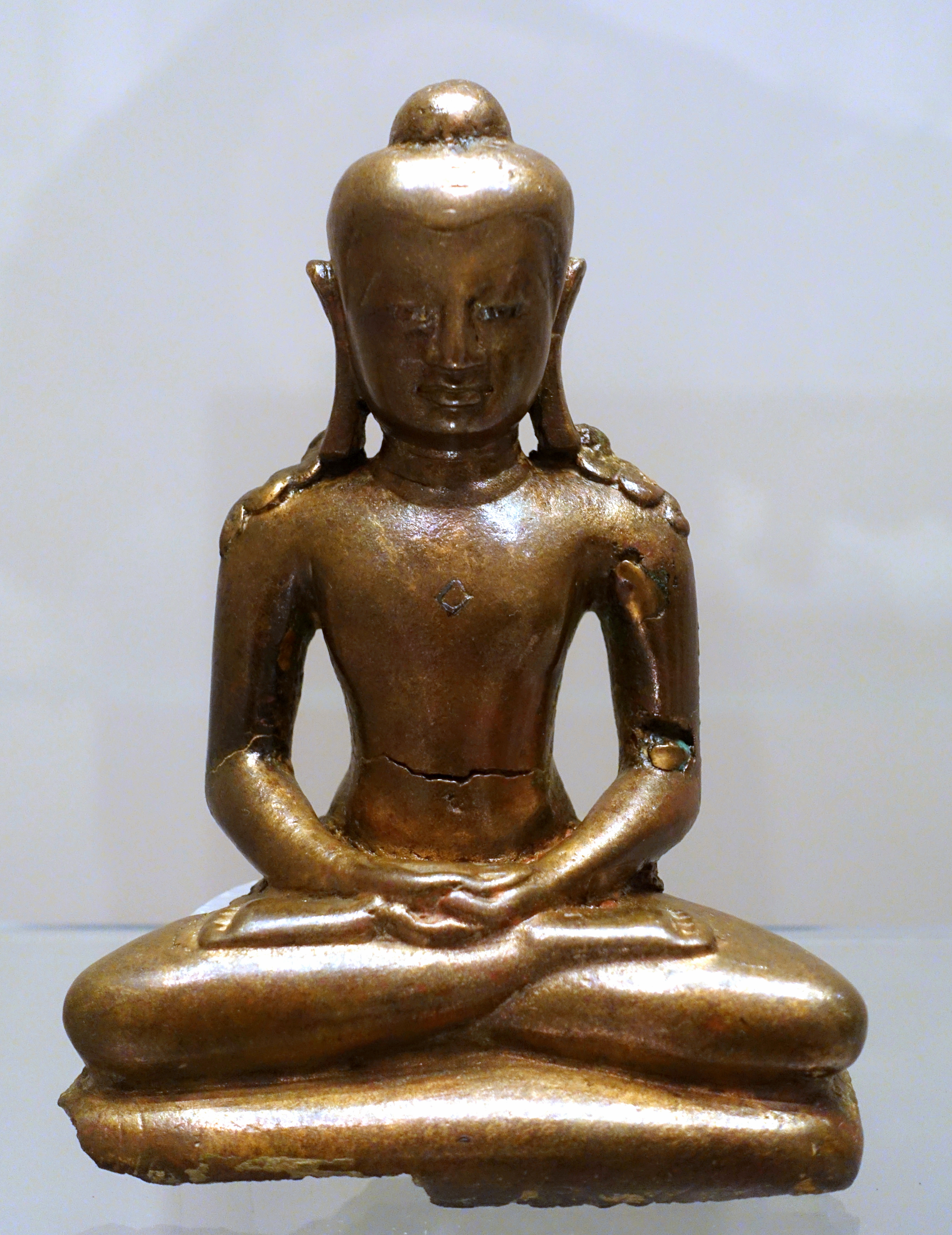
Idol at Ethnological Museum of Berlin, 8th century

== Colossal statues ==
In Madhya Pradesh, there is the Bawangaja (meaning 52 yards (48 m)) hill, near Barwani with a Gommateshvara figure covered on the top of it. This site is important to Jain pilgrims particularly on the full moon day in January. The site has a Rishabanatha statue carved from a volcanic rock. The town of Chanderi houses Khandargiri, which features a 45-foot rock-cut statue carved between the 13th and 16th centuries. Nearby, Golakot in Shivpuri district features a 10th-century circular hill shrine. The 58.4 feet (17.8 m) Rishabhanatha Statue at Gopachal Hill. Thousands of Jain idols including 58.4 feet (17.8 m) idol of Rishabhanatha were carved in the Gopachal Hill idol from 1398 CE to 1536 CE by rulers of Tomaras of Gwalior – Viramdev, Dungar Singh and Kirti Singh.

Statue of Ahimsa, carved out of a single rock, is a 108 feet (33 m) tall (121 feet (37 m) including pedestal) statue of Rishabhanatha and is 1,840 sq feet in size. It is said to be the world's tallest Jain idol. It is located 4,343 feet (1,324 m) above from sea level, at Mangi-Tungi hills near Nashik (Maharashtra). Officials from the Guinness Book of World Records visited Mangi Tungi and awarded the engineer of the 108 feet (33 m) tall Rishabhdeva statue, C R Patil, the official certificate for the world's tallest Jain idol. In 2016, a 108 feet idol of Rishabhnatha (Adinatha) was installed at Palitana. A 43 feet (13 m) statue of Rishabhanatha was unveiled at the Abhay Prabhavana Museum in 2024.

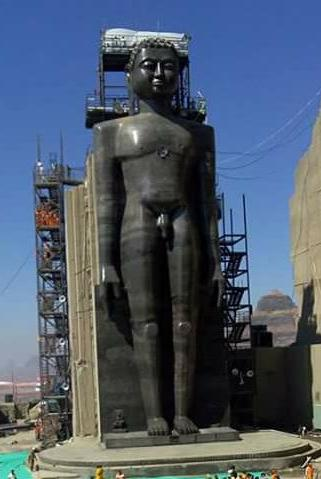
Statue of Ahimsa, Maharashtra, 108 feet (33 m)

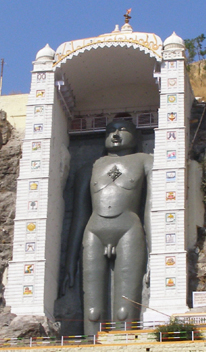
Bawangaja, Madhya Pradesh, 84 feet (26 m)

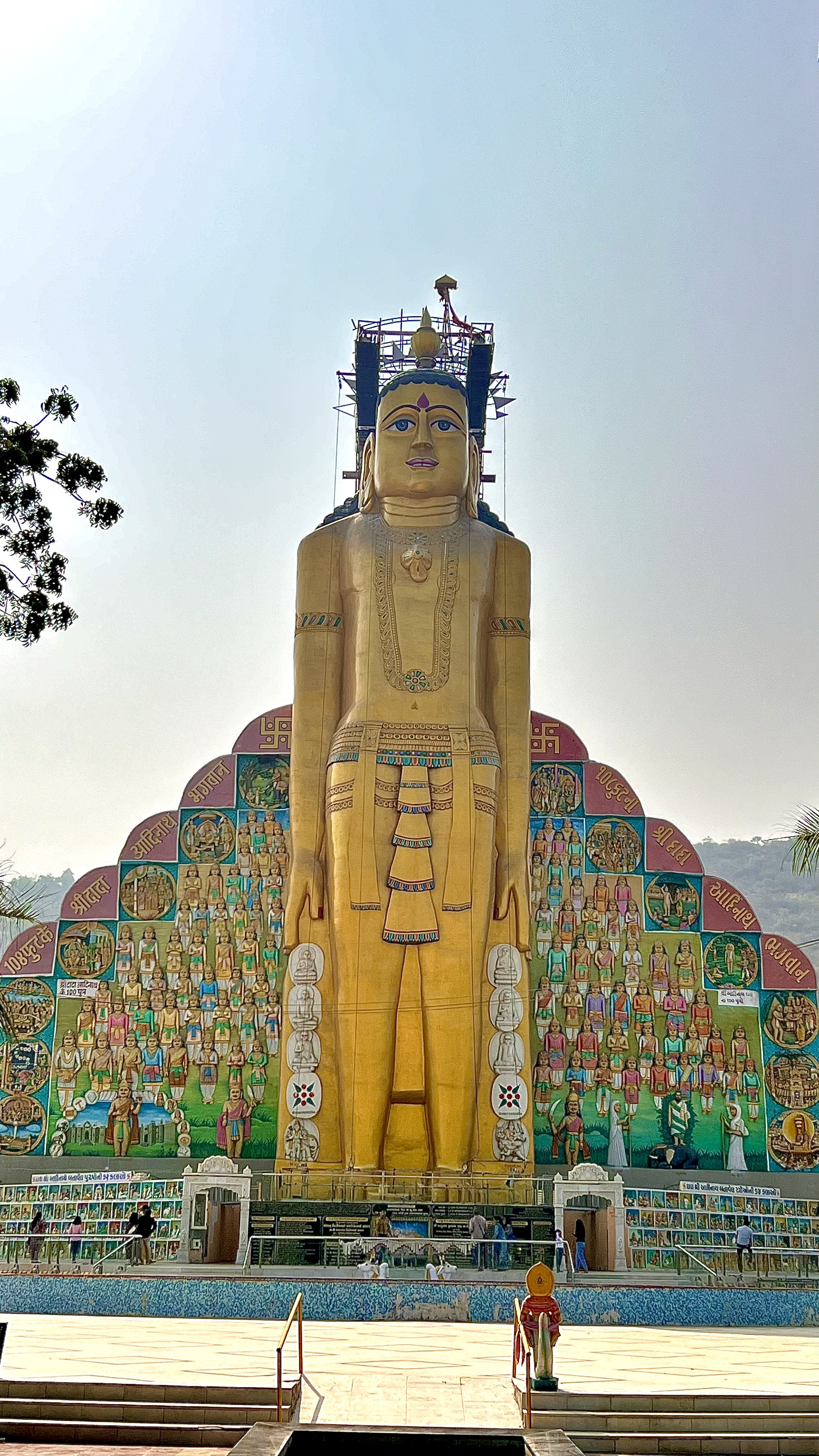
108 feet (33 m) statue at Palitana

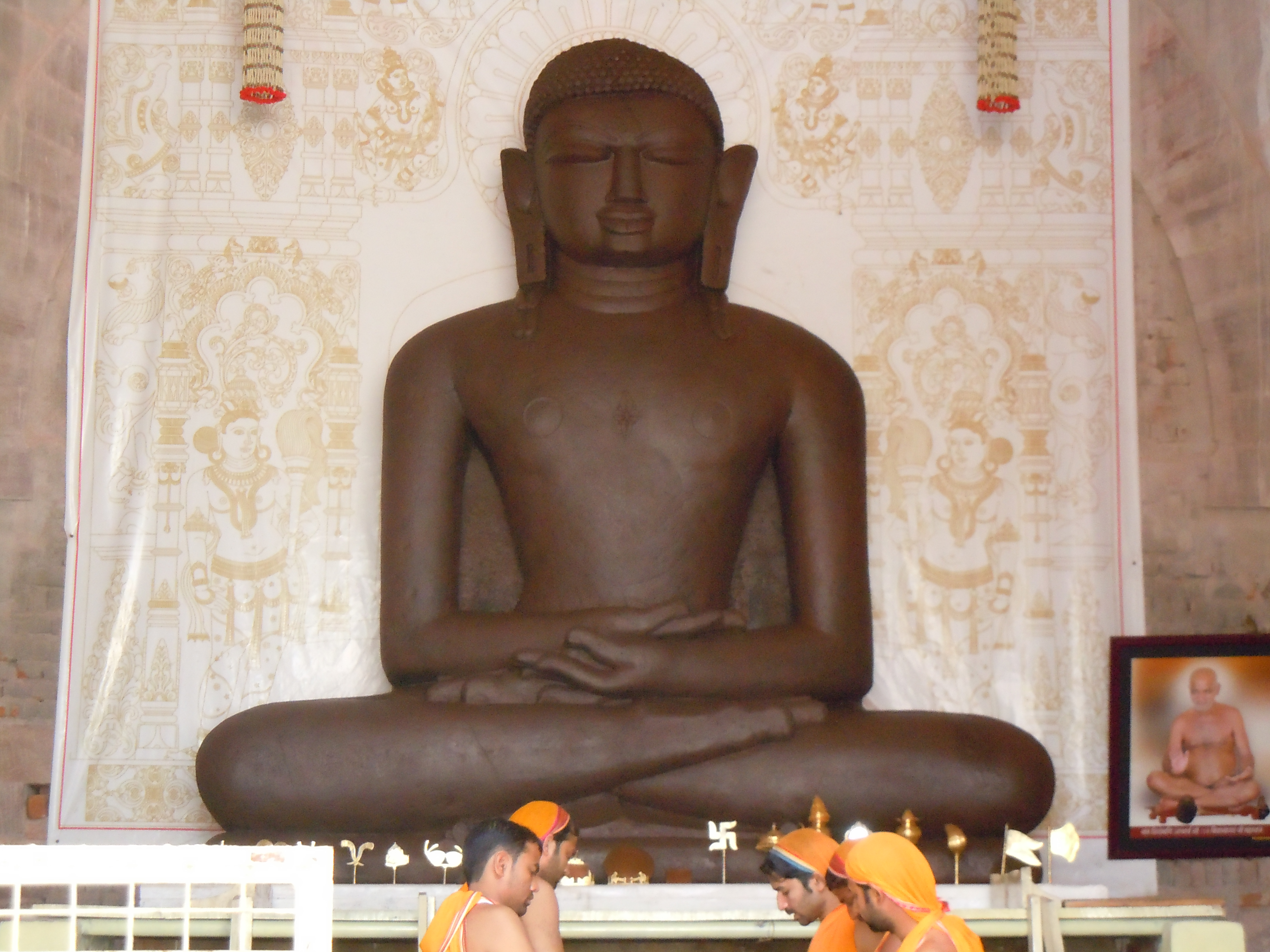
Adinatha at Bade Baba Temple, Kundalpur

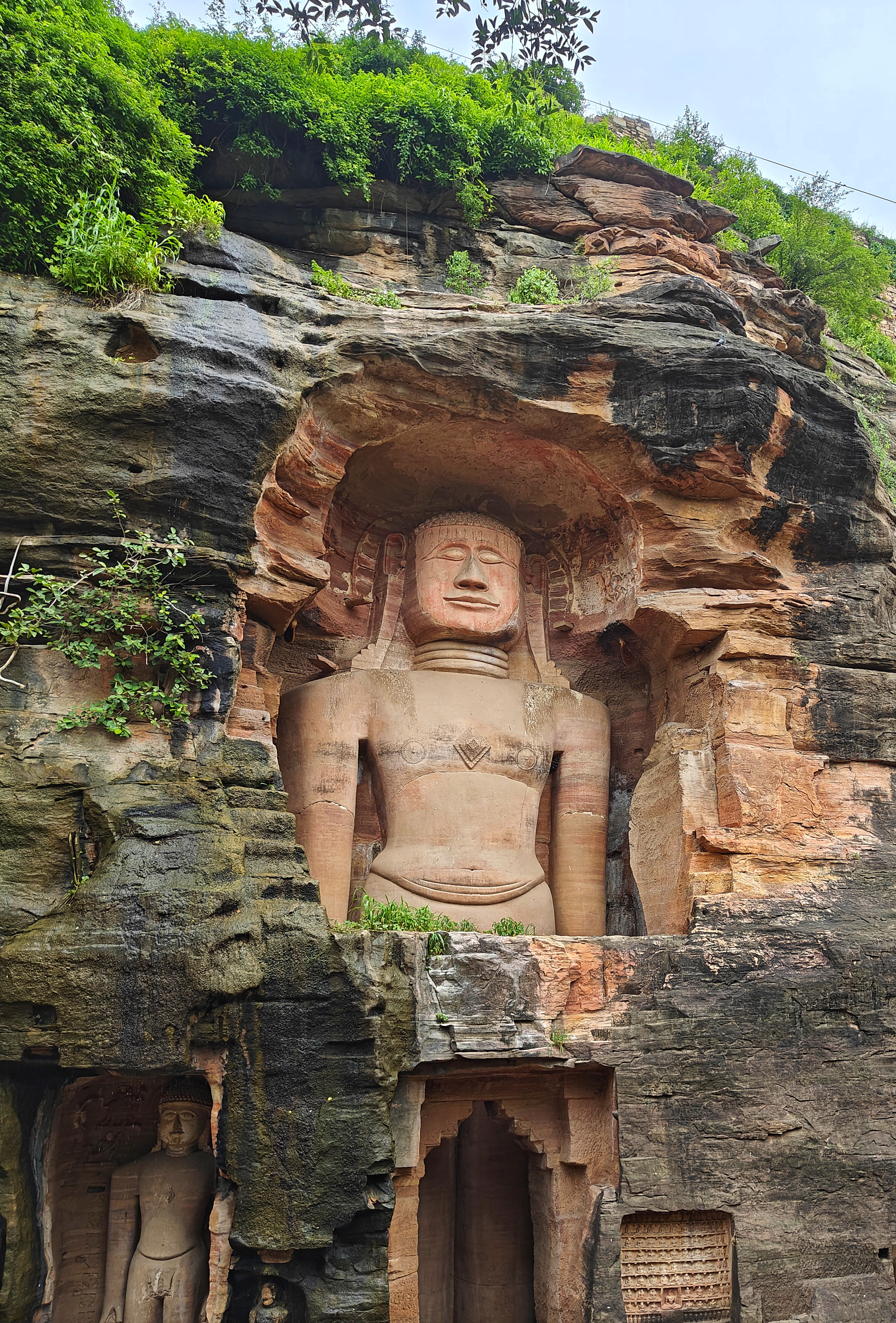
The 58.4 feet (17.8 m) colossal at Gopachal Hill

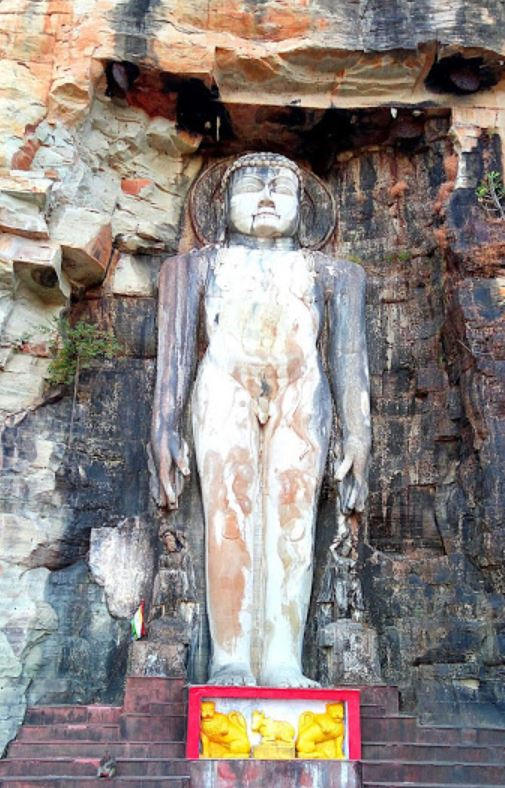
The 45 feet (14 m) tall rock cut idol at Khandargiri Jain Caves, Chanderi

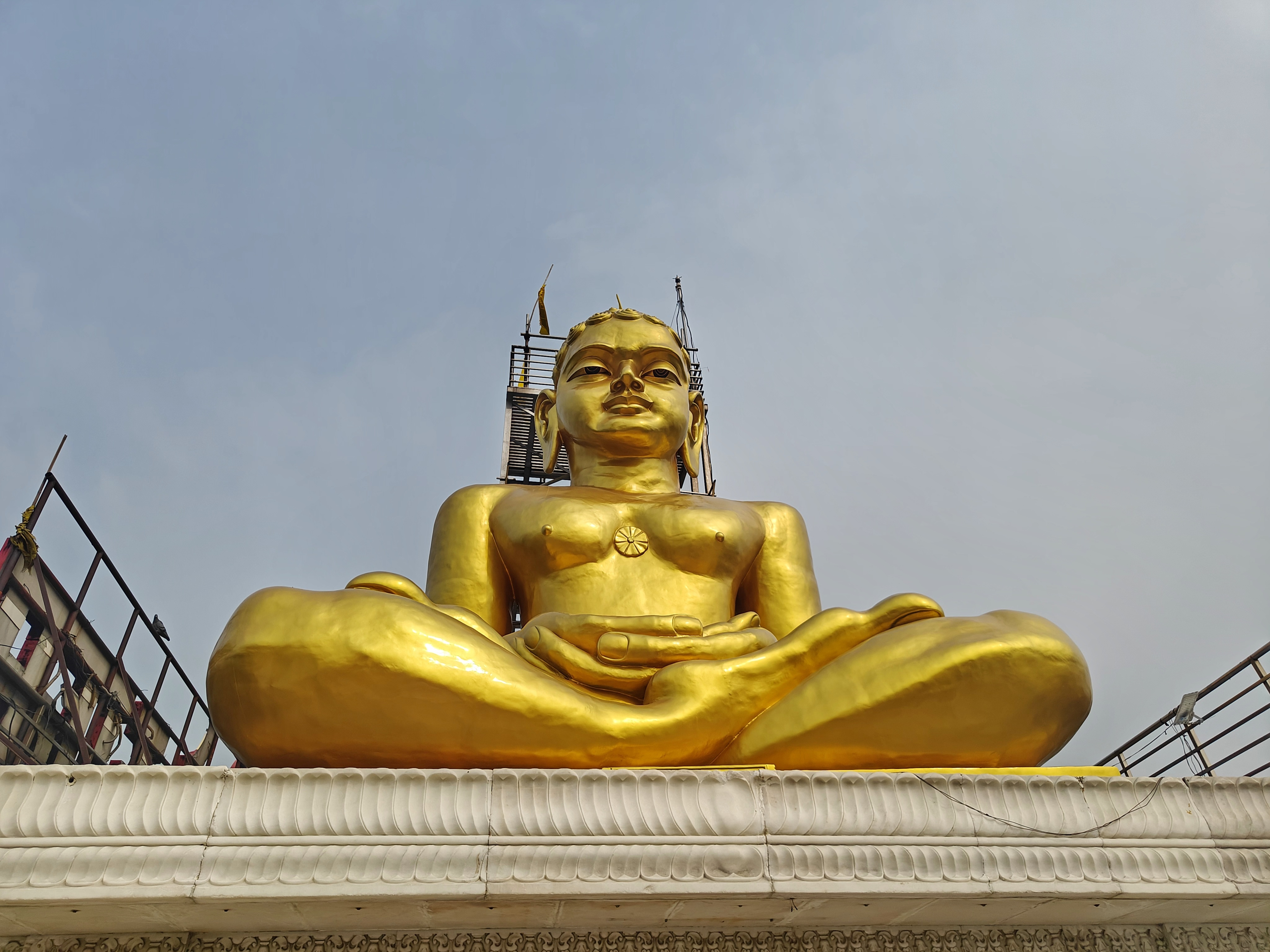
The 31 feet (9.4 m) idol at Trilok Teerth Dham, Bada Gaon

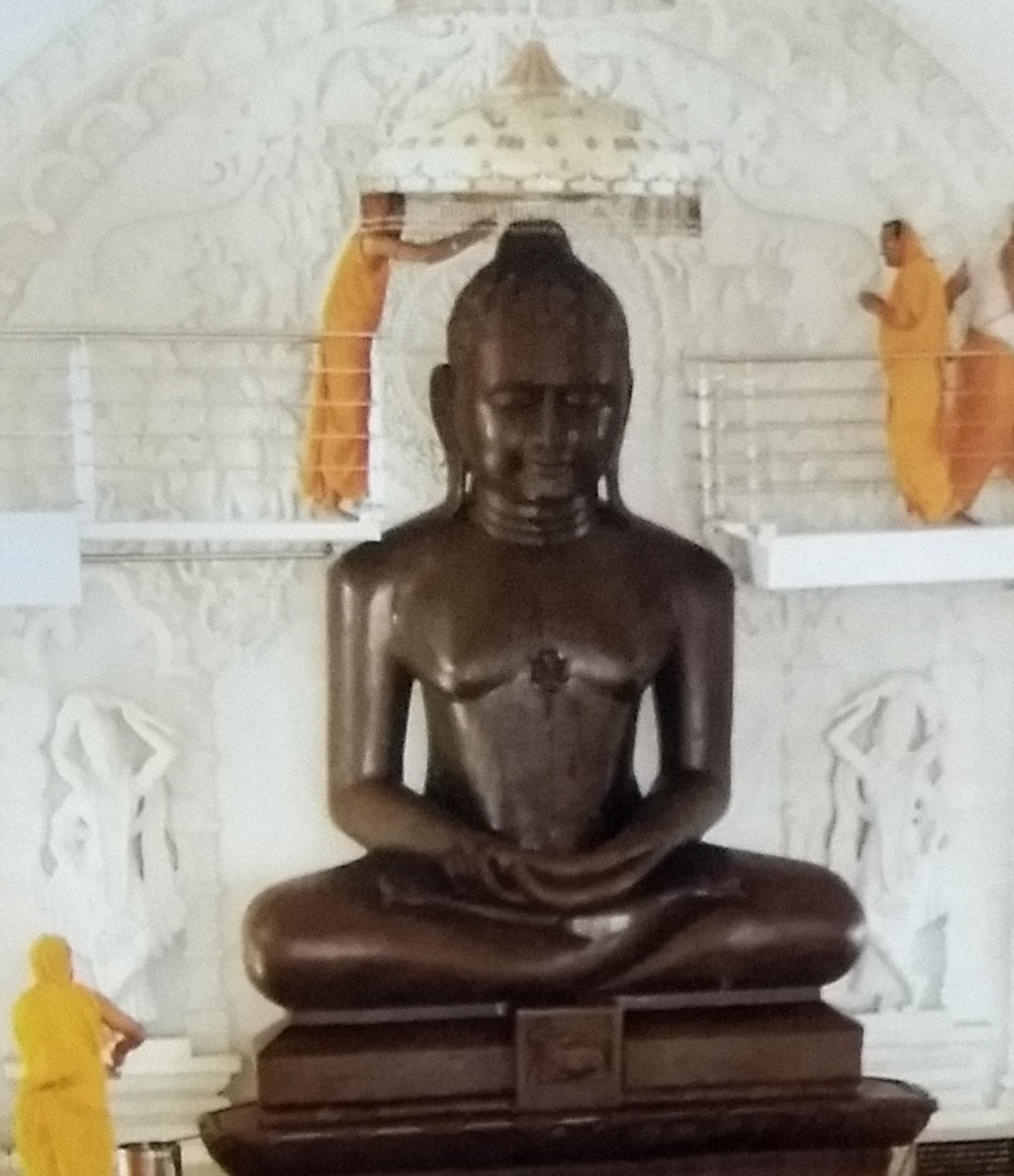
The 25 feet (7.6 m) idol at Dadabari, Kota

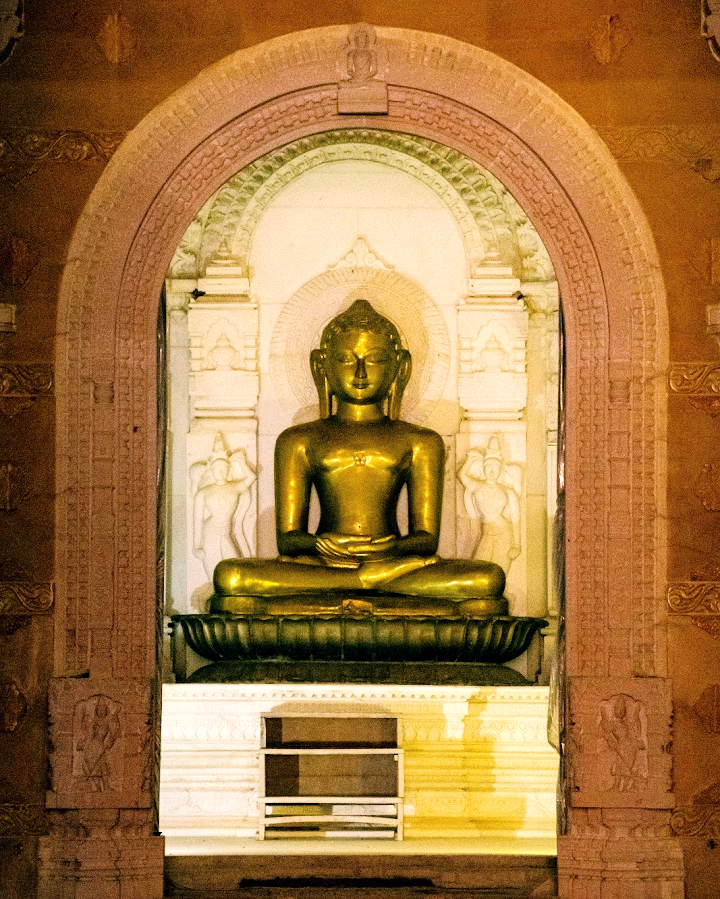
The 24 feet (7.3 m) idol at Sarvodaya Jain temple

== Temples ==
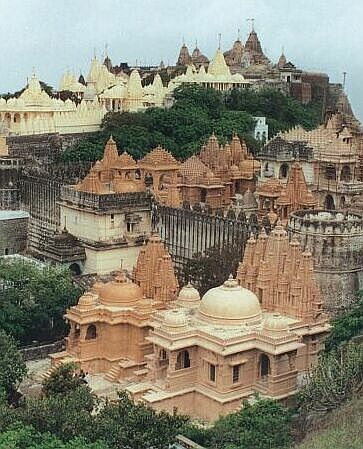
Palitana temples in Gujarat

Rishabhanatha is one of the five most devotionally revered tirthankaras in Jainism, alongside Mahavira, Parshvanatha, Neminatha, and Shantinatha. Numerous other temples commemorate Rishabhanatha across Indian subcontinent.

=== Sites of birth and liberation ===
Rishabhanatha was born in Ayodhya, making it a highly venerated site with numerous dedicated shrines. According to Jain texts, he attained moksha (liberation) at Mount Ashtapad, which is traditionally identified with Mount Kailash in the Himalayas. Because the geographical location of Ashtapad is inaccessible to most pilgrims, large structural replicas have been constructed in India to allow devotees to worship the site of his liberation, most notably the Kailash Parvat Rachna in Hastinapur, Uttar Pradesh.

=== Western India ===
In western India, Mount Shatrunjaya (part of the Palitana temples complex) in Gujarat is a major pilgrimage site. Jain tradition holds that 23 of the 24 tirthankaras, including Rishabhanatha, preached on this hill, and numerous monks achieved liberation there. The central temple of the complex commemorates his enlightenment in Ayodhya. The primary icon is commonly referred to as grandfather (dada). According to scholar John E. Cort, this icon is the most revered among Śvētāmbara murtipujakas, with some devotees attributing miraculous powers to it. Jain textual tradition also states that Kunti and the five Pandava brothers of the Mahabharata visited the hill to pay their respects and consecrated an icon of Rishabhanatha. Also in Gujarat, the Pavagadh hill hosts historically significant Digambara shrines dedicated to him.

Rajasthan features several significant temples dedicated to the deity. The 15th-century Ranakpur Jain temple is noted for its complex architecture and central four-faced (chaumukha) idol of Rishabhanatha. The Vimal Vasahi temple at the Dilwara Temples complex on Mount Abu, constructed in 1031 CE by Vimal Shah, is carved entirely from white marble and serves as a shrine to Rishabhanatha. The Kesariyaji Tirth in Rishabhdeo houses a black stone idol of the tirthankara that is venerated by Jains, Vaishnava Hindus, and local Bhil communities. Other notable sites in Rajasthan include Soniji Ki Nasiyan in Ajmer, which contains a large golden diorama depicting Ayodhya, and the Sanghiji temple in Sanganer, an ancient Digambara shrine constructed of red sandstone.

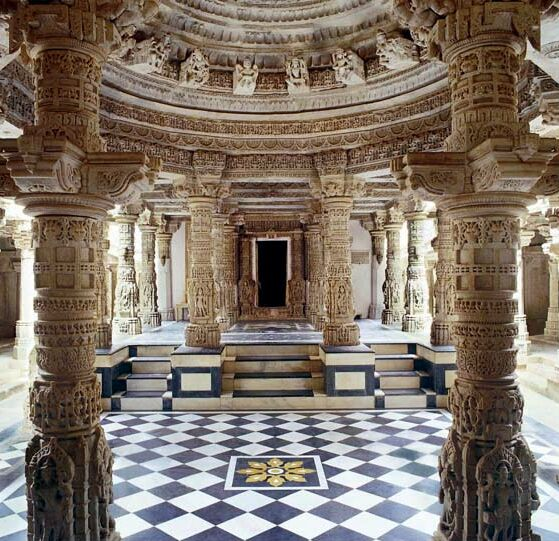
Vimal Vasahi, Dilwara temples

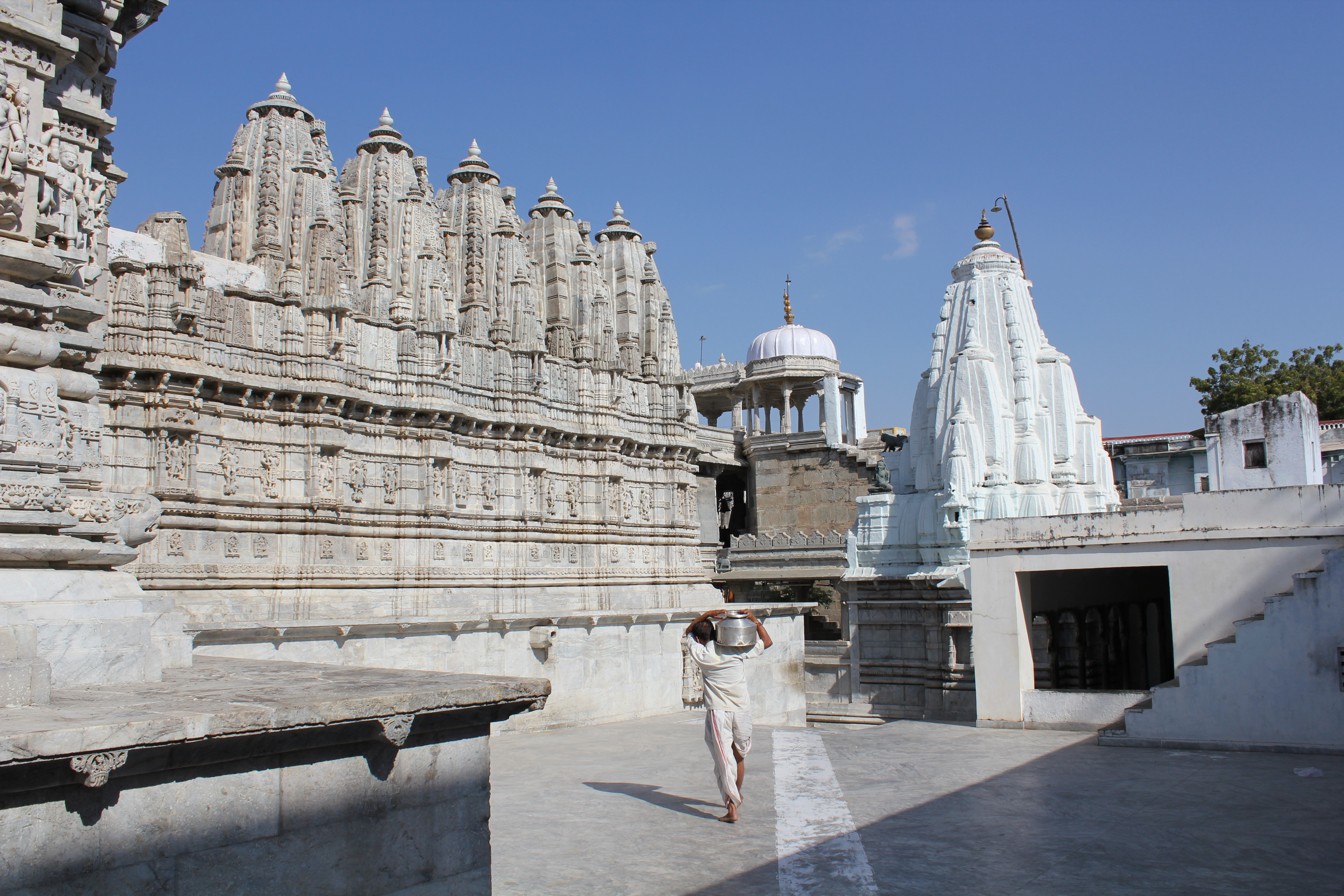
Kesariyaji Tirth, Rajasthan

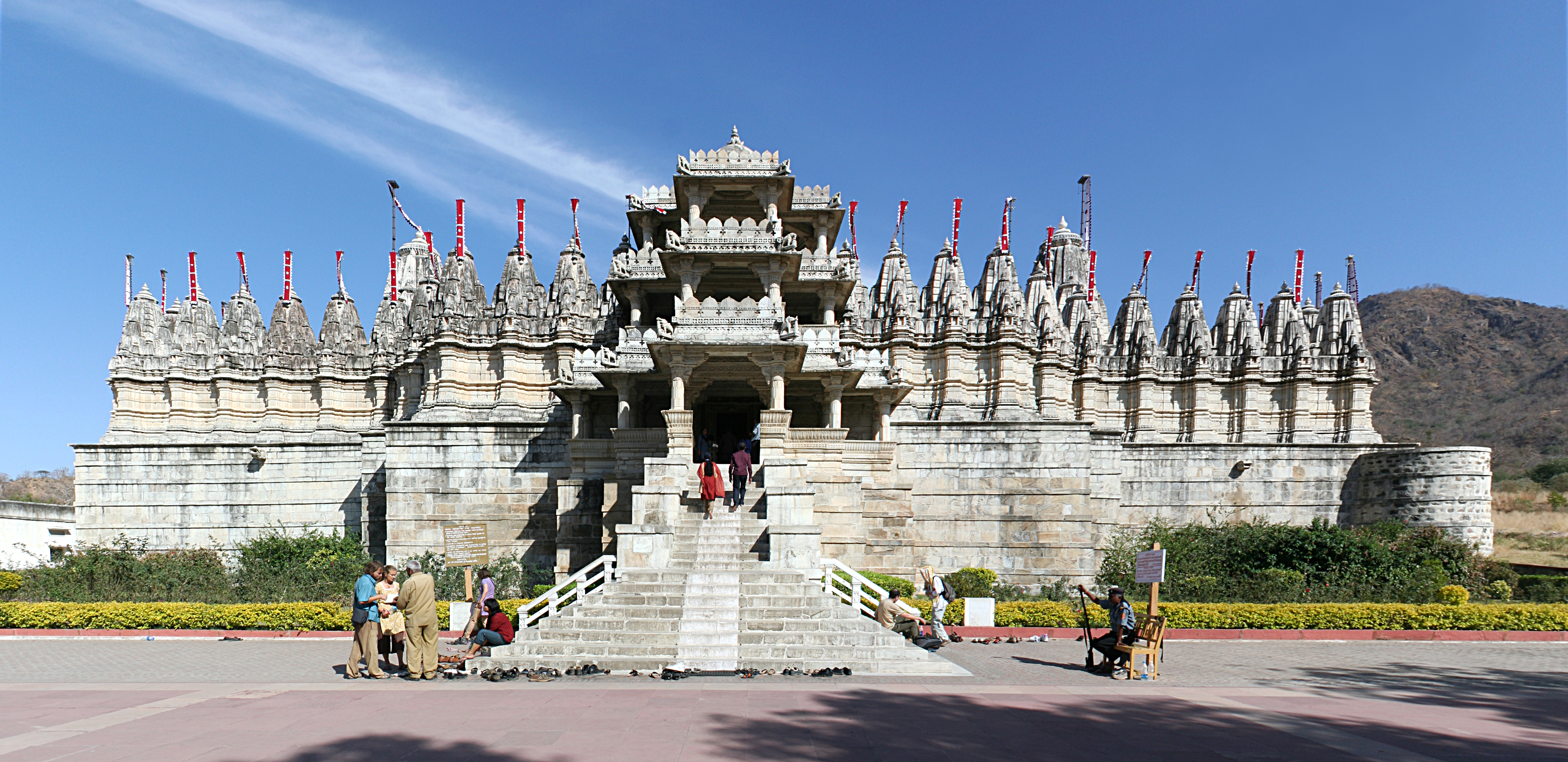
Ranakpur temple, Ranakpur, Rajasthan

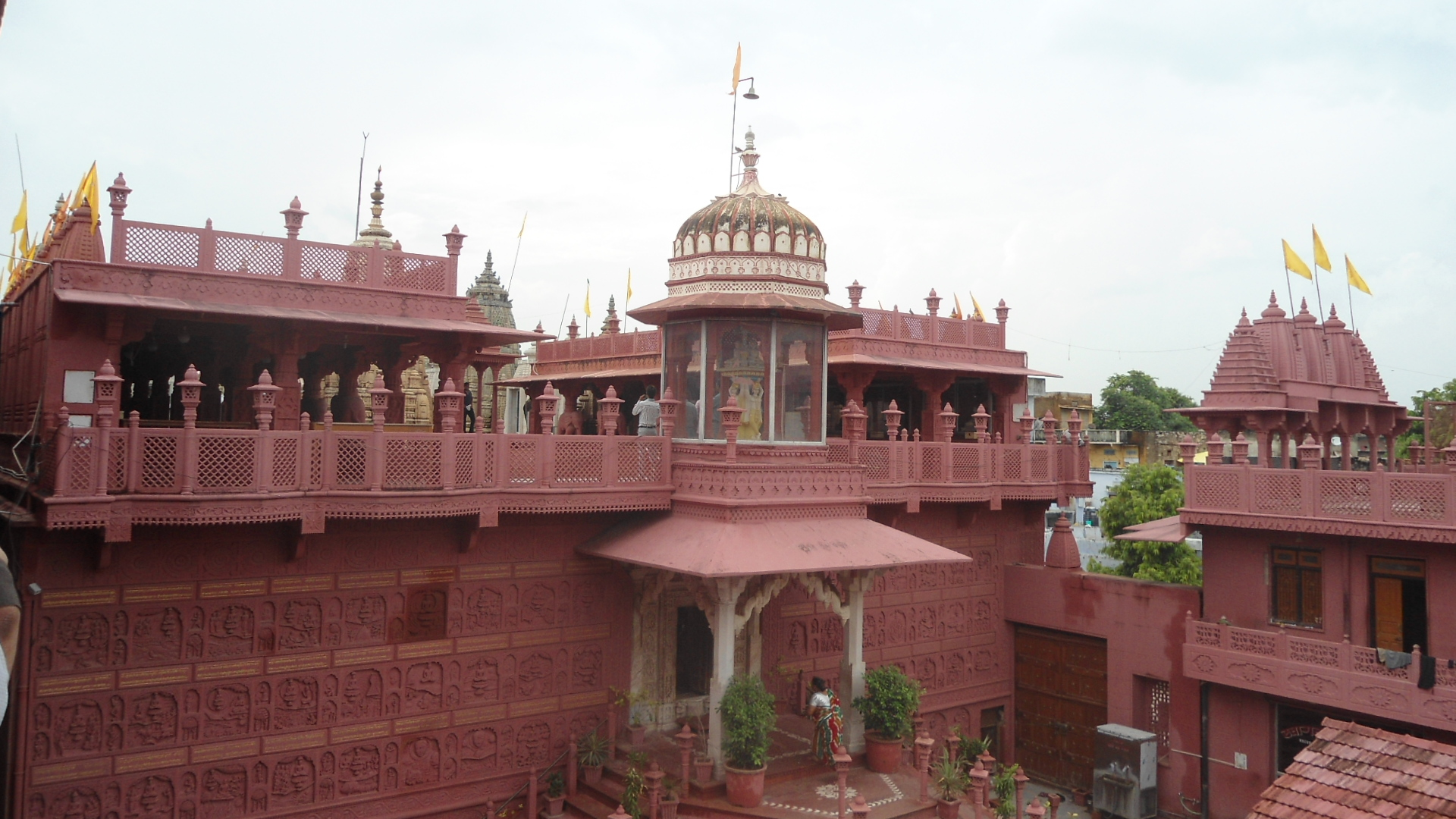
Sanghiji, Sanganer

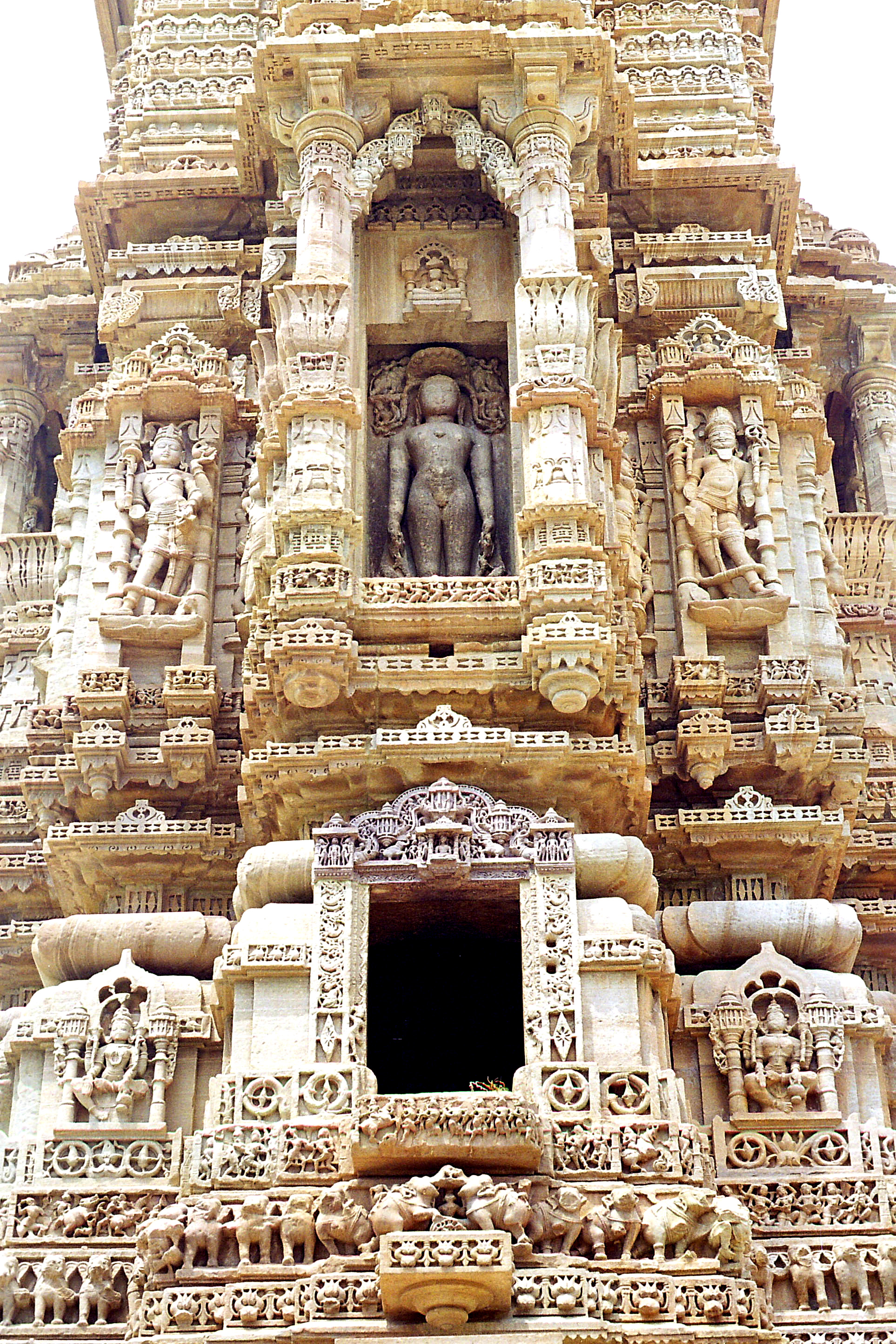
Kirti Stambh, Chittor Fort

=== Central and Northern India ===
In central and northern India, the Adinatha temple, Khajuraho (a UNESCO World Heritage Site in Madhya Pradesh) was built during the Chandela dynasty in the 11th century. Kundalpur is a major Digambara pilgrimage site in Madhya Pradesh, known for its large seated statue of Rishabhanatha locally referred to as "Bade Baba". Other regional sites include the 108 shrines of Paporaji, the Hanumantal Bada Jain Mandir in Jabalpur, and the Sarvodaya Jain temple under construction in Amarkantak, which houses a massive eight-metal (ashtadhatu) idol. In Uttar Pradesh, Trilok Teerth Dham serves as a regional center of worship.

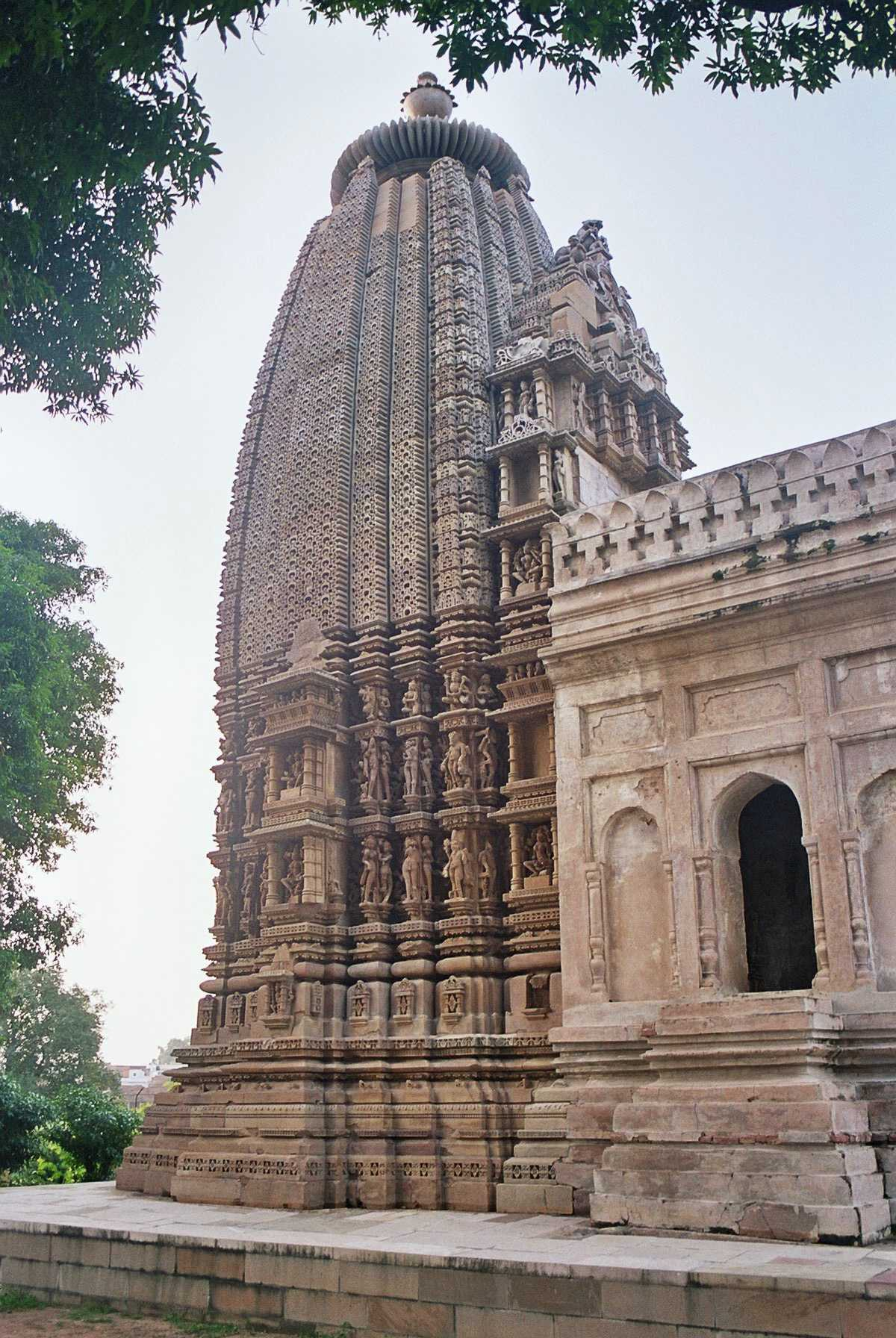
Adinatha temple, Khajuraho, a UNESCO World Heritage Site

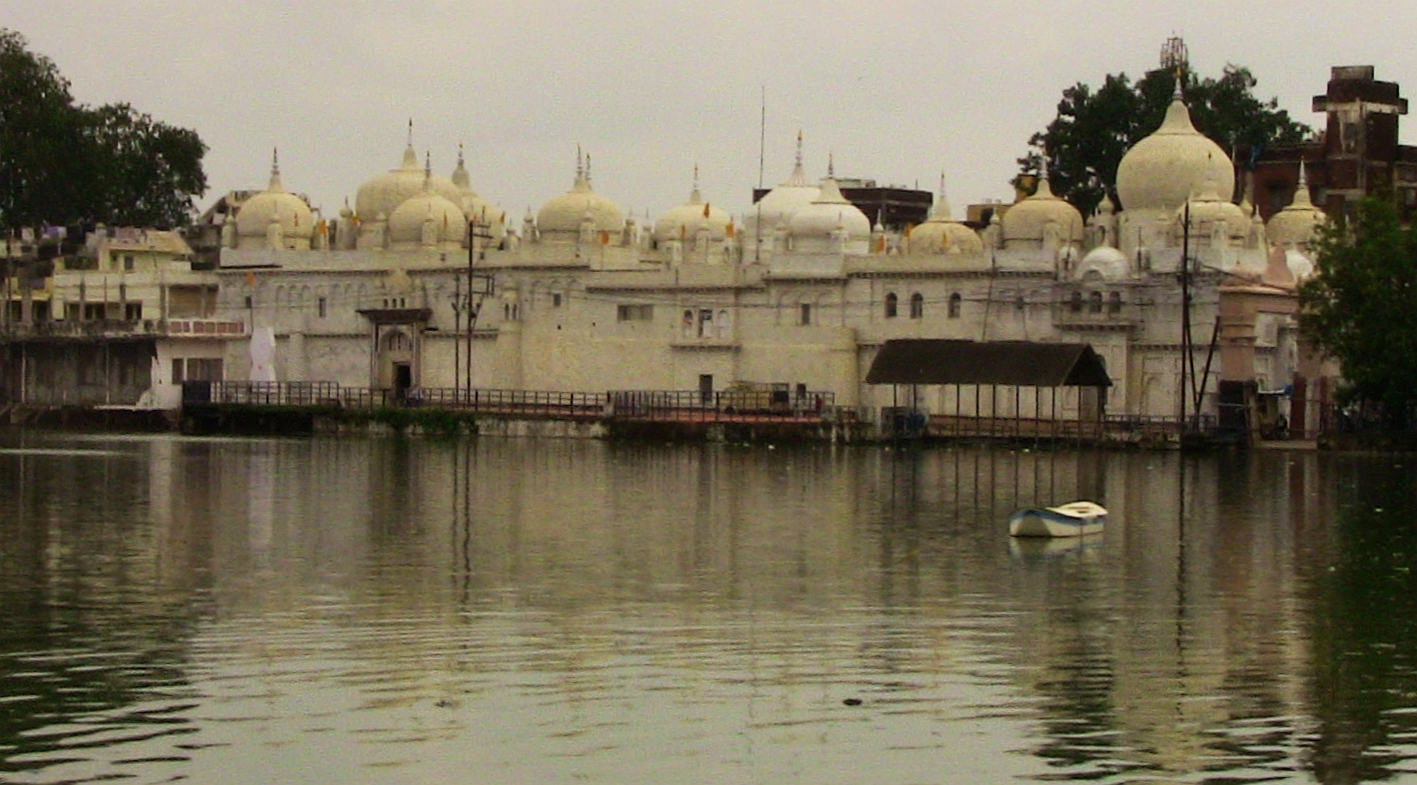
Hanumantal Bada Jain Mandir

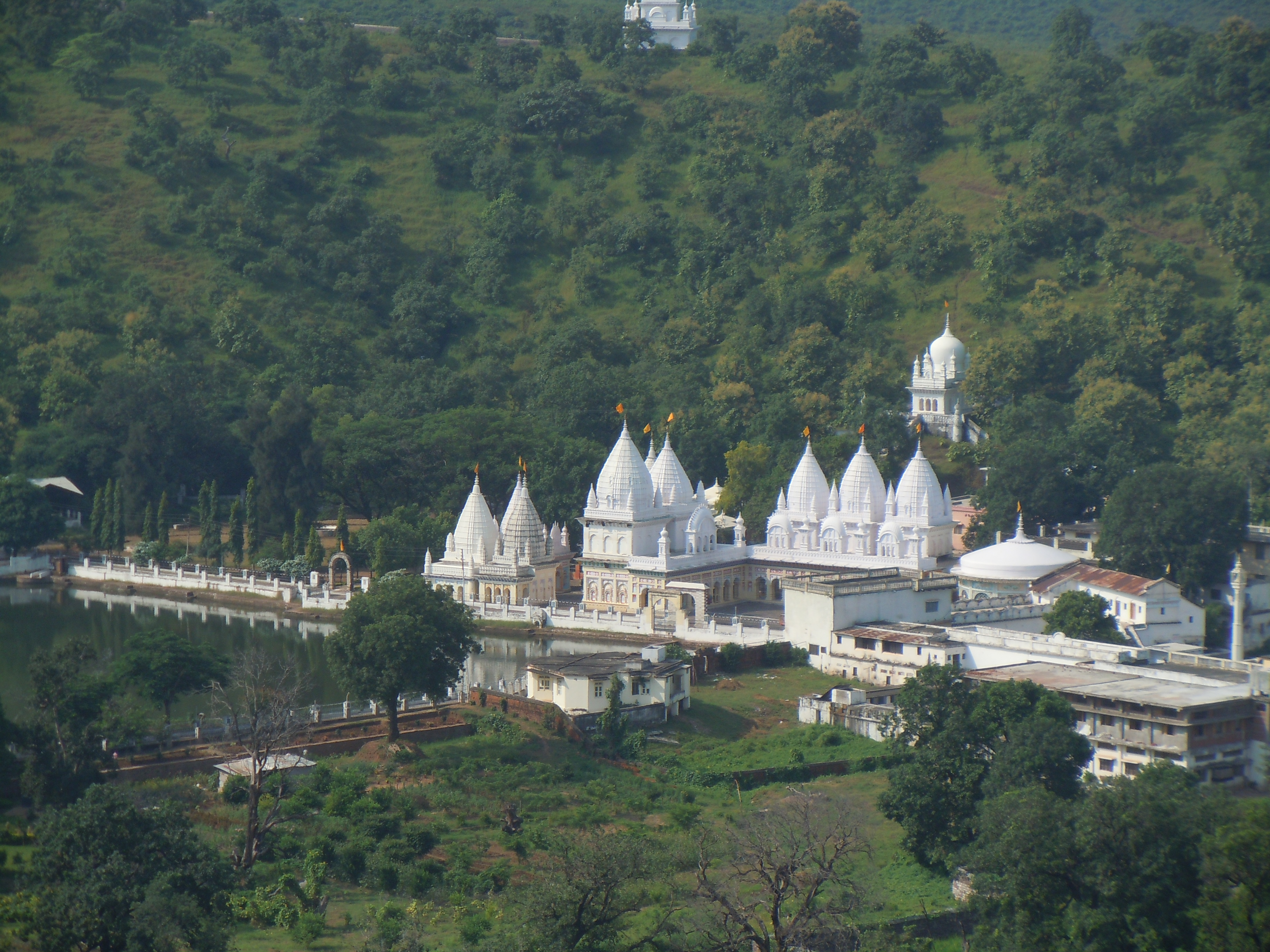
Kundalpur

=== Southern India ===
In southern India, Kulpakji in Telangana is a Śvētāmbara pilgrimage center housing a green jade idol of Rishabhanatha. In Karnataka, the Panchakuta Basadi, Kambadahalli, constructed in the 10th century during the Western Ganga dynasty, includes a dedicated shrine to Rishabhanatha.

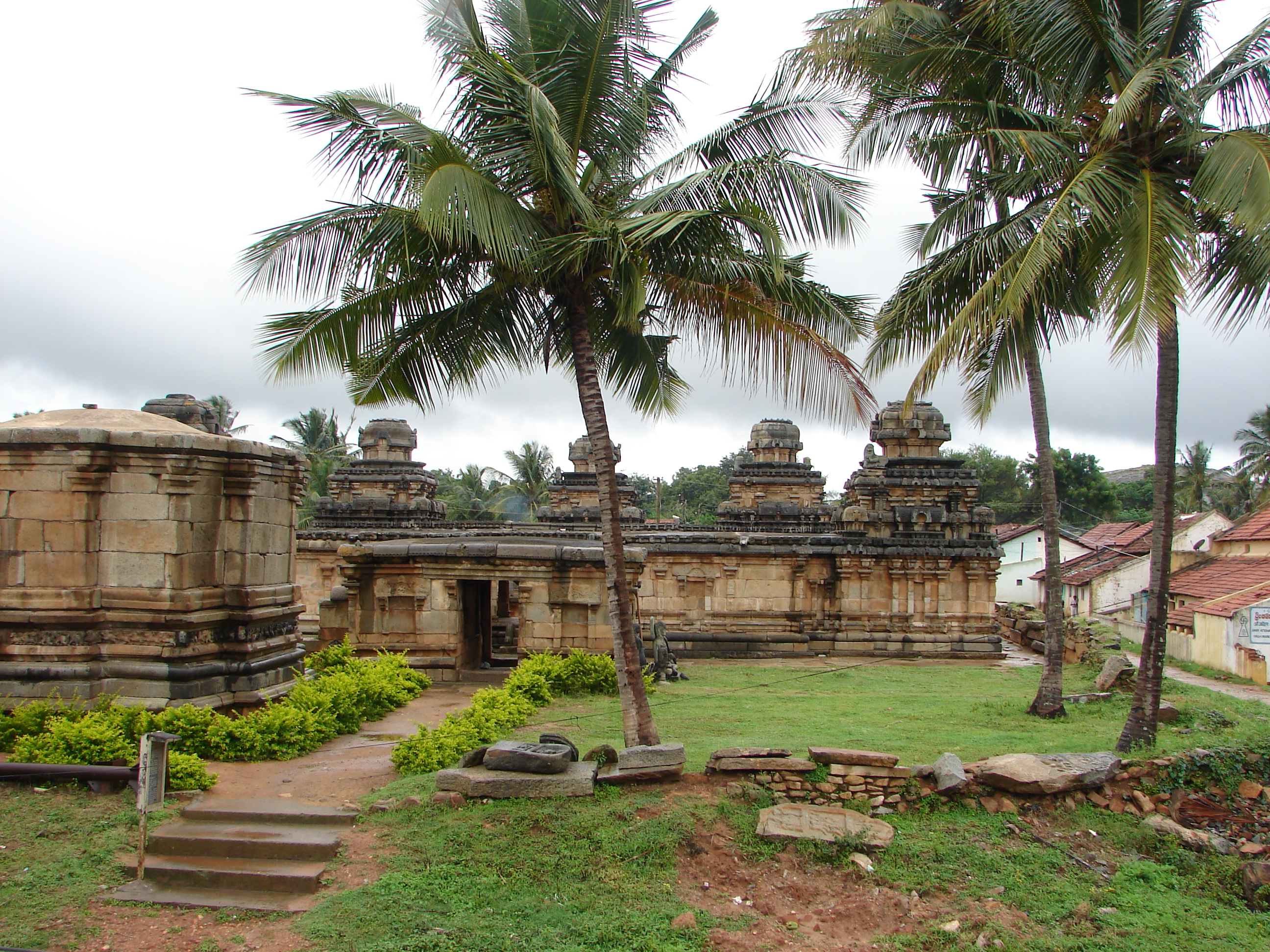
Panchakuta Basadi, Kambadahalli constructed in the 10th century during the Western Ganga dynasty in modern Karnataka

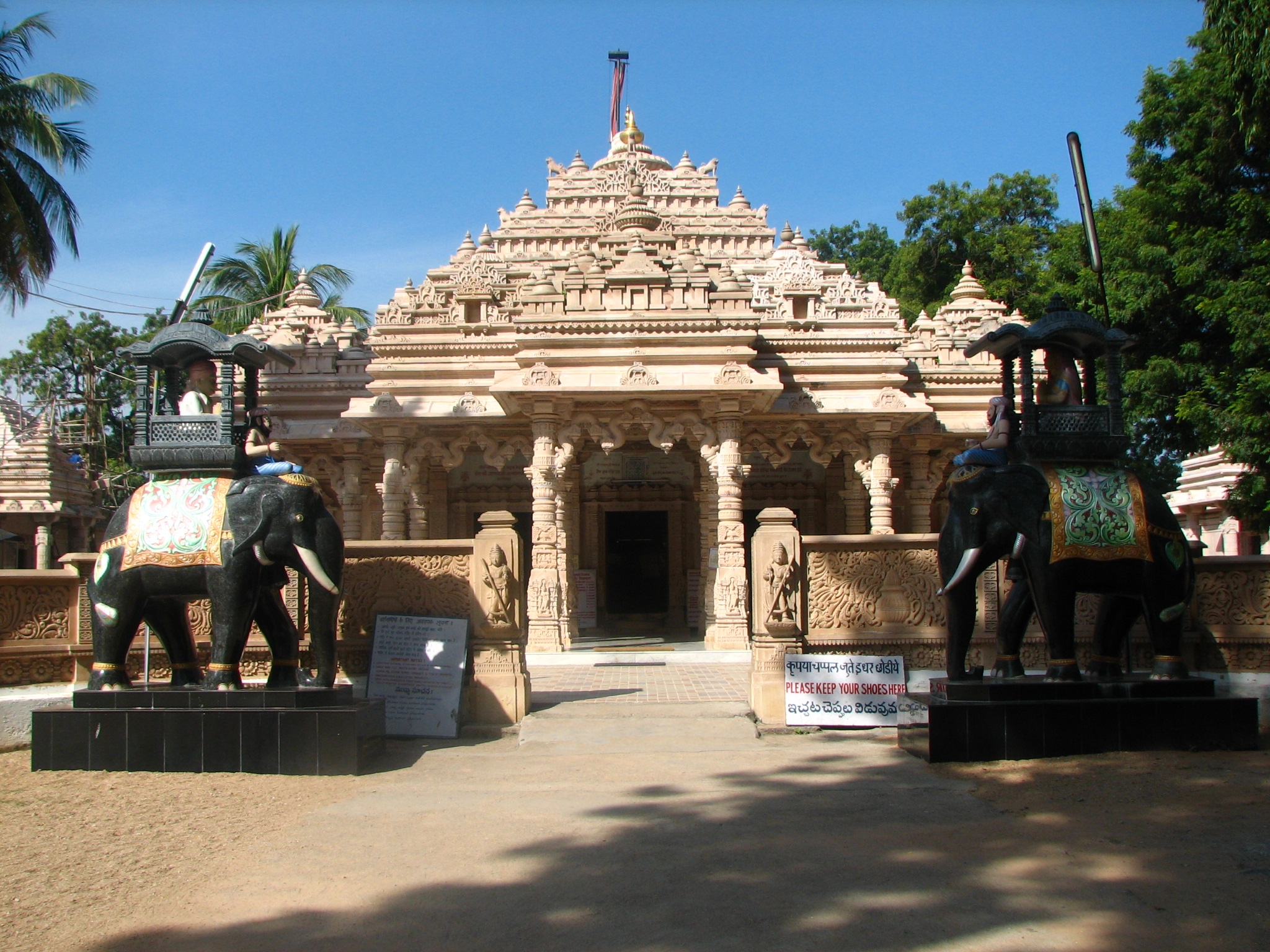
Kulpakji Tirth in Telangana

== See also ==
- List of Jain Tirthankaras
- List of Tirthankaras
- God in Jainism
- History of Jainism
- Siddha
