= Jain art =

Works of art associated with Jainism

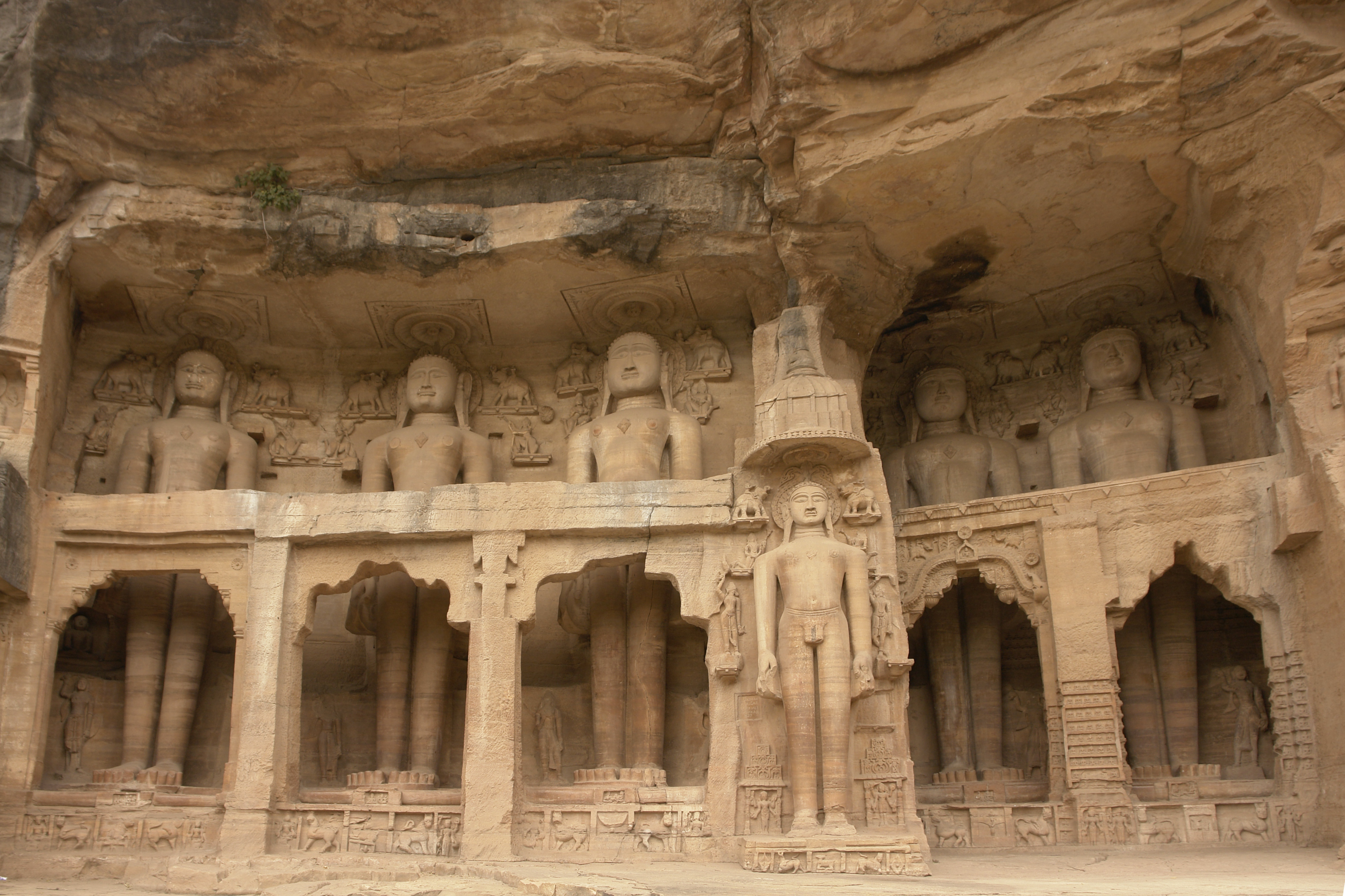
Rock carved Jain statues at Siddhachal Caves inside Gwalior Fort.

Jain art refers to religious works of art associated with Jainism. Even though Jainism has spread only in some parts of India, it has made a significant contribution to Indian art and architecture.

In general, Jain art broadly follows the contemporary style of Indian Buddhist and Hindu art, though the iconography, and the functional layout of temple buildings, reflects specific Jain needs. The artists and craftsmen producing most Jain art were probably not themselves Jain, but from local workshops patronized by all religions. This may not have been the case for illustrated manuscripts, where many of the oldest Indian survivals are Jain.

Jains mainly depict tirthankara or other important people in a seated or standing meditative posture, sometimes on a very large scale. Yaksa and yaksini, attendant spirits who guard the tirthankara, are usually shown with them.

== Iconography of tirthankaras ==
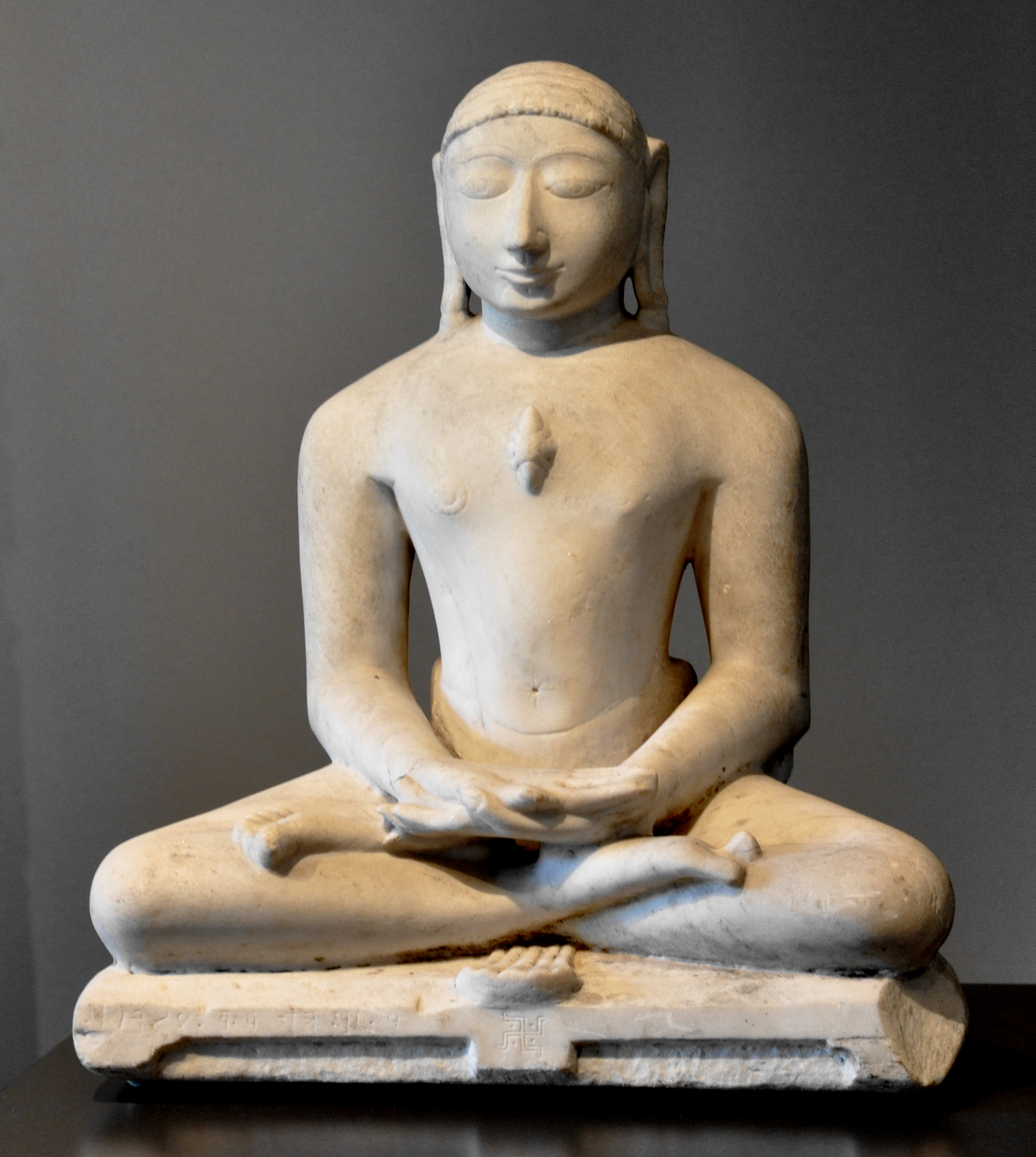
Jina Suparshvanatha in meditation, c. 14th century

A tirthankara or Jina is represented either seated in lotus position (Padmasana) or standing in the meditation Khadgasana (Kayotsarga) posture. This latter, which is similar to the military standing at attention is a difficult posture to hold for a long period, and has the attraction to Jains that it reduces to the minimum the amount of the body in contact with the earth, and so posing a risk to the sentient creatures living in or on it. If seated, they are usually depicted seated with their legs crossed in front, the toes of one foot resting close upon the knee of the other, and the right hand lying over the left in the lap.

Tirthanakar images do not have distinctive facial features, clothing or (mostly) hair-styles, and are differentiated on the basis of the symbol or emblem (Lanchhana) belonging to each tirthanakar except Parshvanatha. Statues of Parshvanath have a snake crown on the head. The first Tirthankara Rishabha can be identified by the locks of hair falling on his shoulders. Sometimes Suparshvanath is shown with a small snake-hood. The symbols are marked in the centre or in the corner of the pedestal of the statue. The Digambara and the Śvetāmbara traditions have different iconography of idols. Digambara images are naked without any ornamentation, whereas Śvetāmbara ones may or may not be clothed and in worship may be decorated with temporary ornaments. The images are often marked with Srivatsa on the chest and Tilaka on the forehead. Srivatsa is one of the ashtamangala (auspicious symbols). It can look somewhat like a fleur-de-lis, an endless knot, a flower or diamond-shaped symbol.

The bodies of tirthanakar statues are exceptionally consistent throughout the over 2,000 years of the historical record. The bodies are rather slight, with very wide shoulders and a narrow waist. Even more than is usual in Indian sculpture, the depiction takes relatively little interest in the accurate depiction of the underlying musculature and bones, but is interested in the modelling of the outer surfaces as broad swelling forms. The ears are extremely elongated, suggesting the heavy earrings the figures wore in their early lives before they took the path to enlightenment, when all were royal.

Sculptures with four tirthanakars, or their heads, facing in four directions, are not uncommon in early sculpture, but unlike the comparable Hindu images, these represent four different tirthanakars, not four aspects of the same deity. Multiple extra arms are avoided in tirthanakar images, though their attendants or guardians may have them.

== Architecture ==
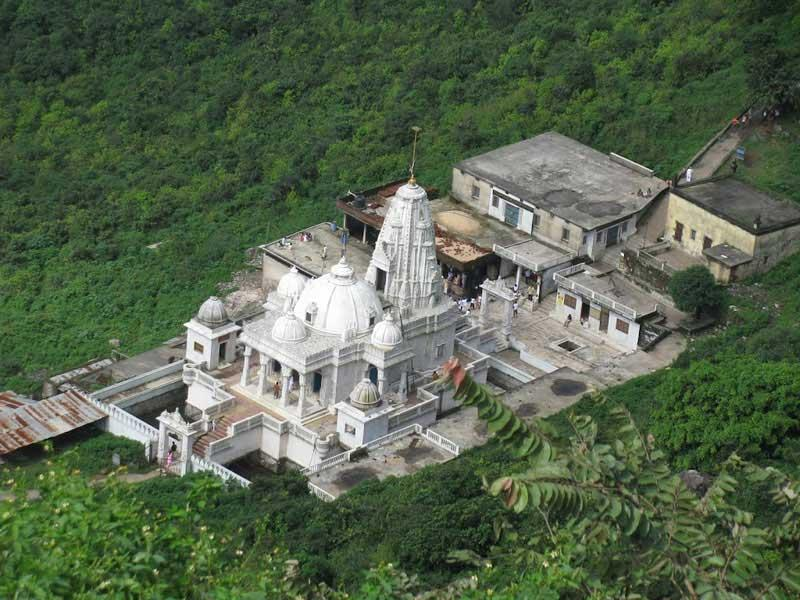
Jal Mandir, Shikharji

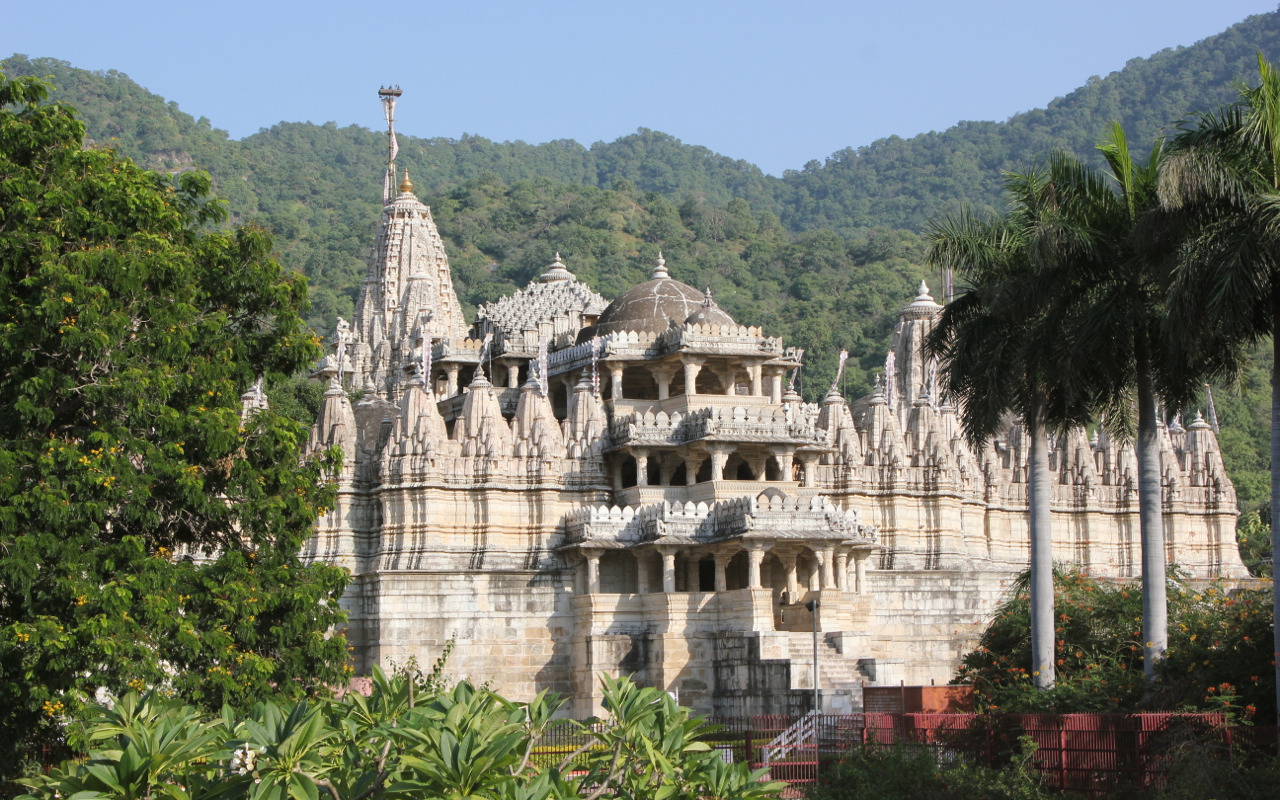
Ranakpur Jain temple built in 15th century

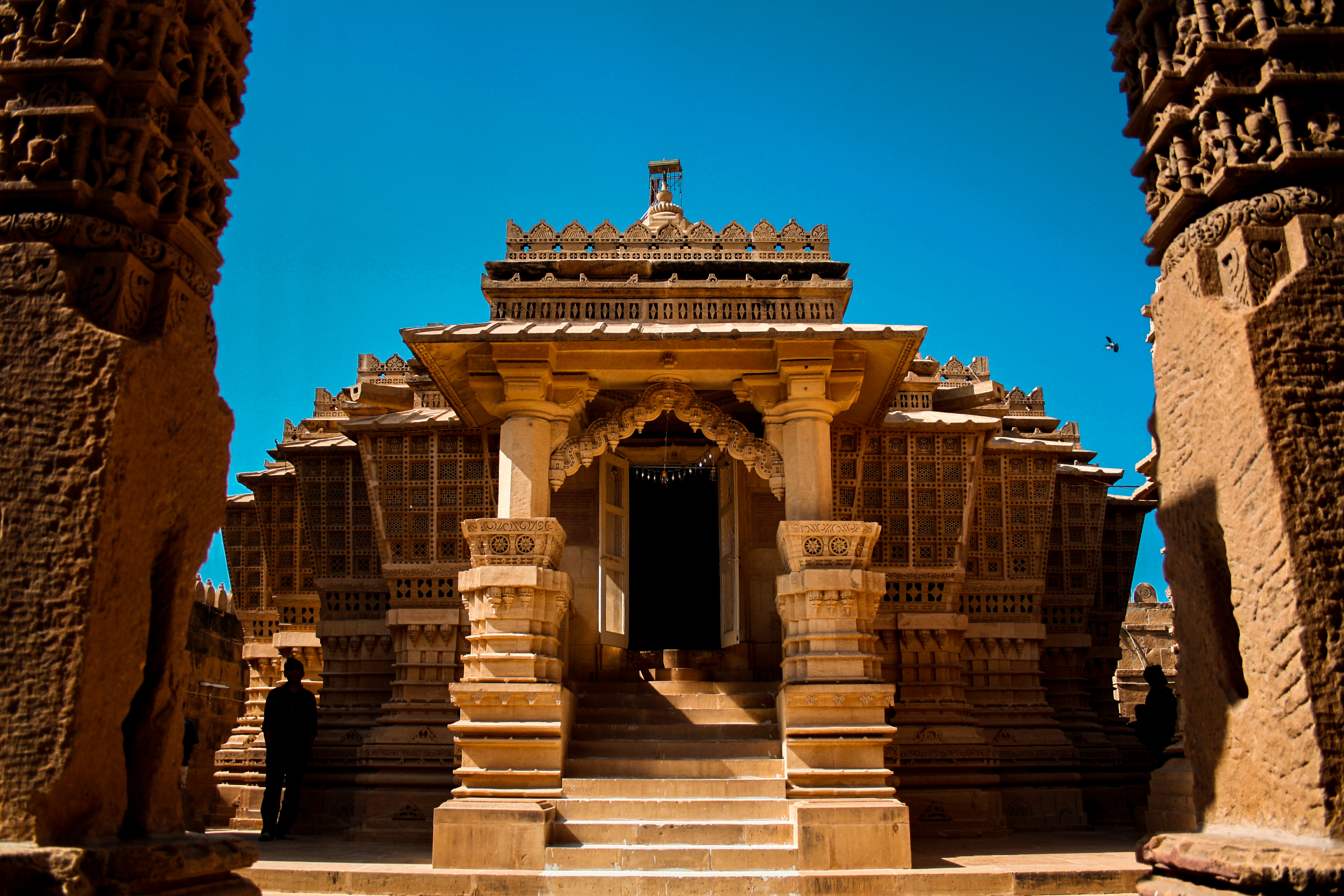
Lodhurva Jain temple

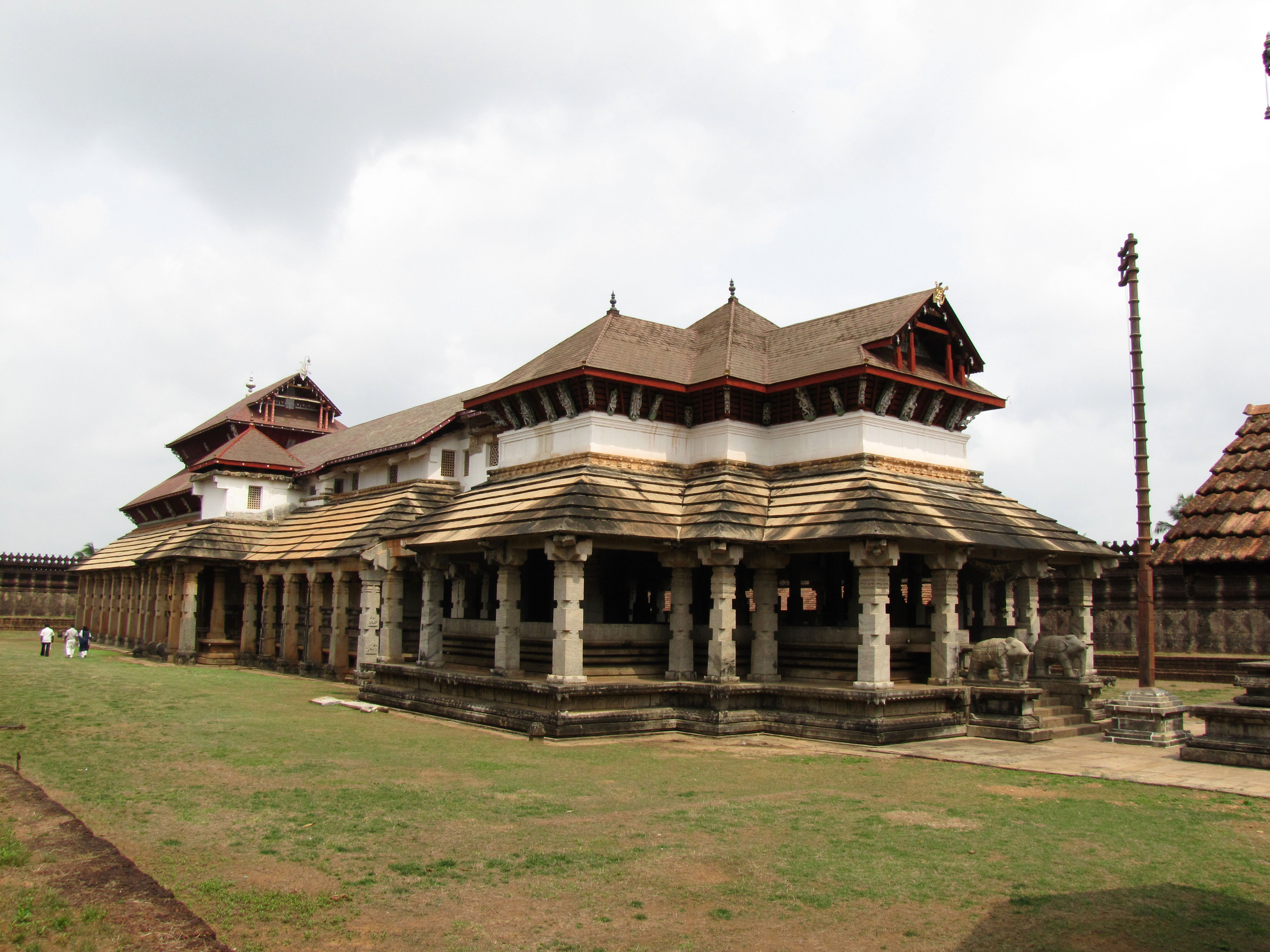
Saavira Kambada Basadi

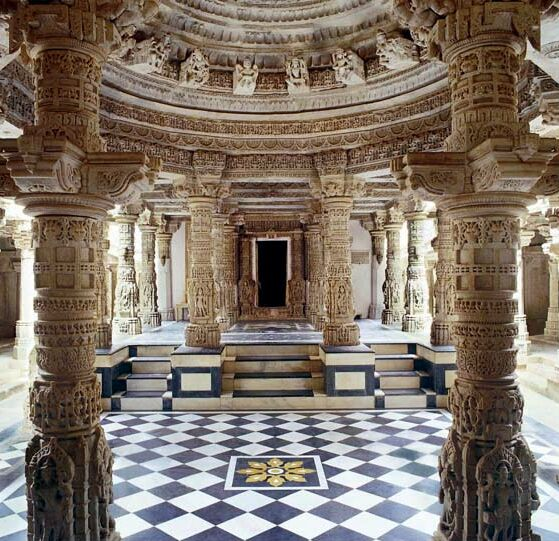
Luna Vasahi, Dilwara Temples

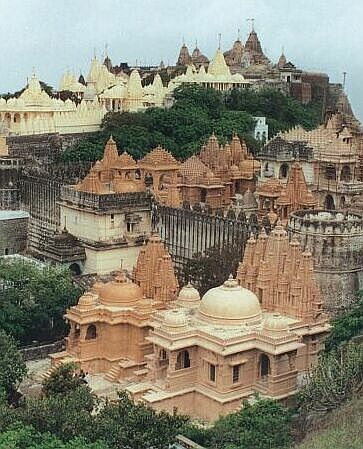
Palitana temples

Like Buddhists, Jains participated in Indian rock-cut architecture from a very early period. Remains of ancient Jaina temples, monasteries, and sculptures are found throughout India, with much of the earliest Jain sculpture consisting of relief carvings. Jain temples and monasteries excavated using rock-cut techniques often share sites with monuments of other religions, as seen at Udayagiri, Bava Pyara, Ellora, Aihole, Badami, Kalugumalai, and Pataini temple. The Ellora Caves represent a particularly significant late site, containing monuments of all three major Indian religions, with the earlier Buddhist caves followed by later Hindu and Jain excavations.

During the medieval and modern periods, Jains constructed numerous Jain temples, particularly in western India. Among the most celebrated are the group of five Dilwara Temples built between the 11th and 13th centuries at Mount Abu in Rajasthan, and the Jain temple at Ranakpur, regarded as one of the finest examples of Jain architecture. The Jain pilgrimage centre on the Shatrunjaya hills near Palitana, Gujarat, is often referred to as the "City of Temples". Both the Dilwara and Shatrunjaya complexes exemplify the Māru-Gurjara (or Solanki) style, which developed in western India during the 10th century and was employed in both Hindu and Jain temples. The style became especially associated with Jain patronage, who continued its use long after it had declined elsewhere and helped spread it to other parts of India. It remains the preferred architectural style for Jain temples worldwide and has recently experienced a revival in Hindu temple architecture.

A Jain temple, also known as a derasar, is a place of worship for Jains, the followers of Jainism. Jain architecture is largely confined to temples and monasteries, while secular Jain buildings generally reflect the architectural traditions of the region and period in which they were constructed. Derasar is the term commonly used for a Jain temple in Gujarat and southern Rajasthan. Basadi denotes a Jain shrine or temple in Karnataka and is the term generally used in South India. Its historical use in North India survives in the names of the Vimala Vasahi and Luna Vasahi temples at Mount Abu. The Sanskrit word vasati refers to an institution that includes residences for scholars attached to a shrine.

Jain temples may be broadly classified into Shikhara-bandhi temples and the Ghar Jain temple. A Shikhar-bandhi temple is a public place of worship distinguished by its prominent superstructure, typically a north Indian shikhara rising above the sanctum, whereas a Ghar Jain temple is a private household shrine. A Jain temple that serves as an important pilgrimage destination is known as a tirtha.

The principal image enshrined in a Jain temple is known as the mula nayak. A Manastambha ("pillar of honour") is a monumental column often erected in front of Jain temples. It typically bears four stone images of the temple's presiding deity, each facing one of the four cardinal directions: north, east, south, and west.

== History ==
=== Earliest depictions of Jain deities (3rd-2nd centuries BCE) ===
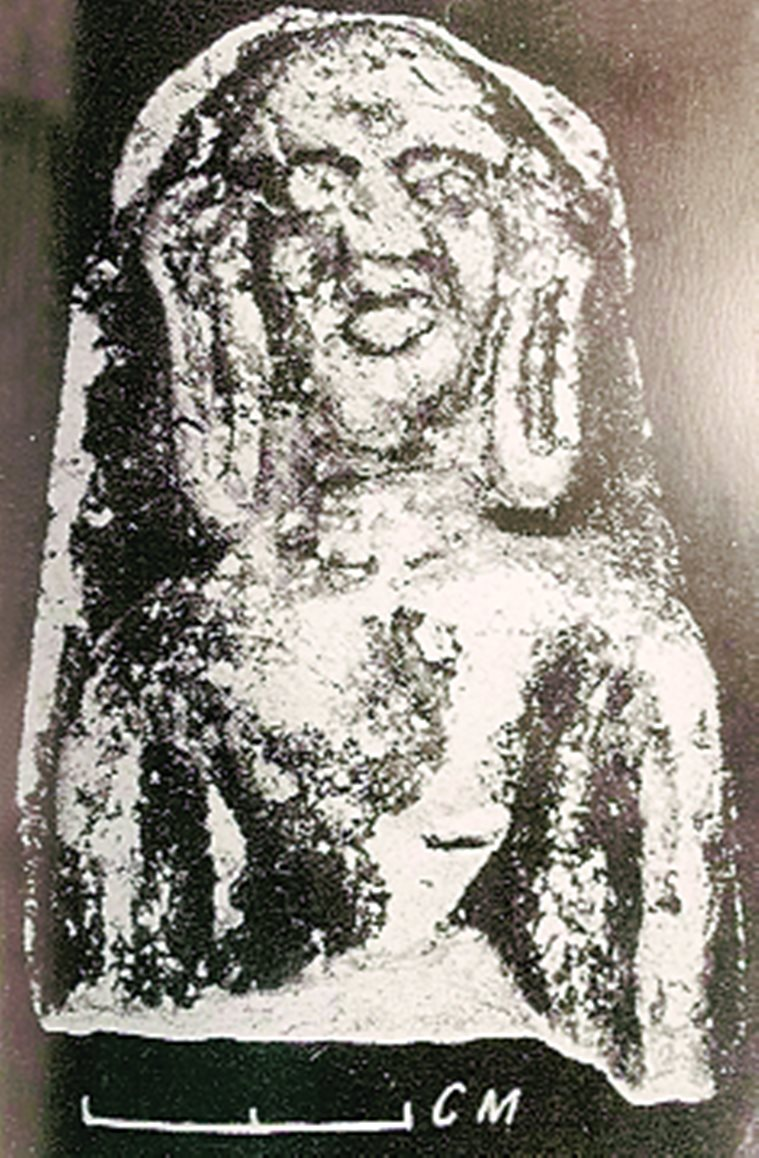
4th century BCE Jain image found during Ayodhya excavation

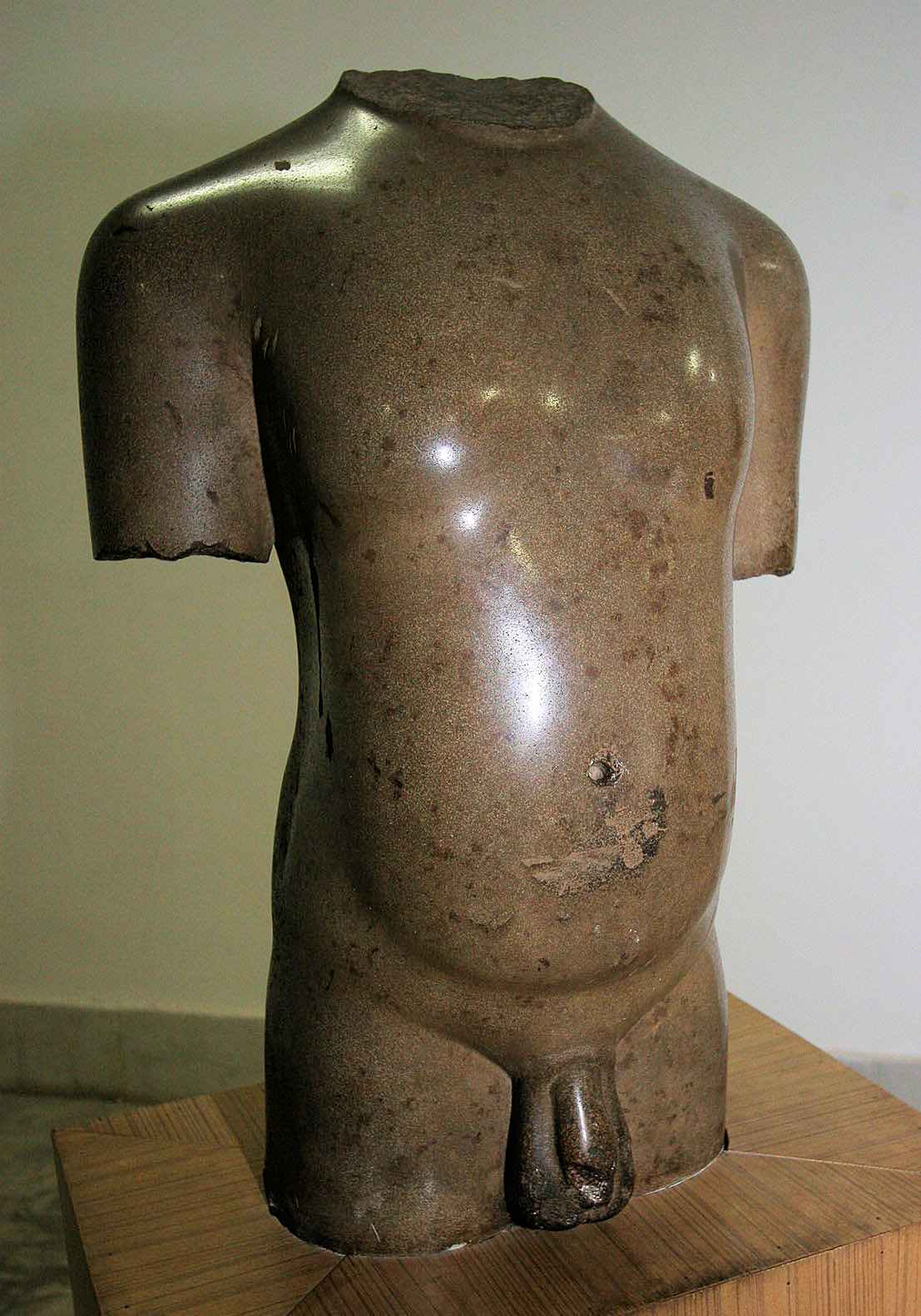
The Lohanipur torso, 3rd century BCE, Patna Museum

During the 3rd-2nd centuries BCE, the adoption of stone sculpture, there was an older tradition of using clay or wood to represent Jain deities, which, because of their inherent fragility, have not survived.

Figures on various seals from the Indus Valley civilisation bear similarity to jaina images, nude and in a meditative posture. The Lohanipur torso is the earliest known jaina image (presumed to be Jain because of the nudity and posture), and is now in the Patna Museum. It is also one of the earliest Indian monumental sculptures in stone of a human, if the dating to the 3rd century BCE is correct; it might be from about the 2nd century CE. Bronze images of the 23rd tirthankara, Pārśva, can be seen in the Prince of Wales Museum, Mumbai, and in the Patna Museum; these are dated to the 2nd century BCE.

The early Udayagiri and Khandagiri Caves, are a number of finely and ornately carved caves built during 2nd-century BCE excavated by King Kharavela of Mahameghavahana dynasty.

=== Early reliefs (1st century BCE) ===
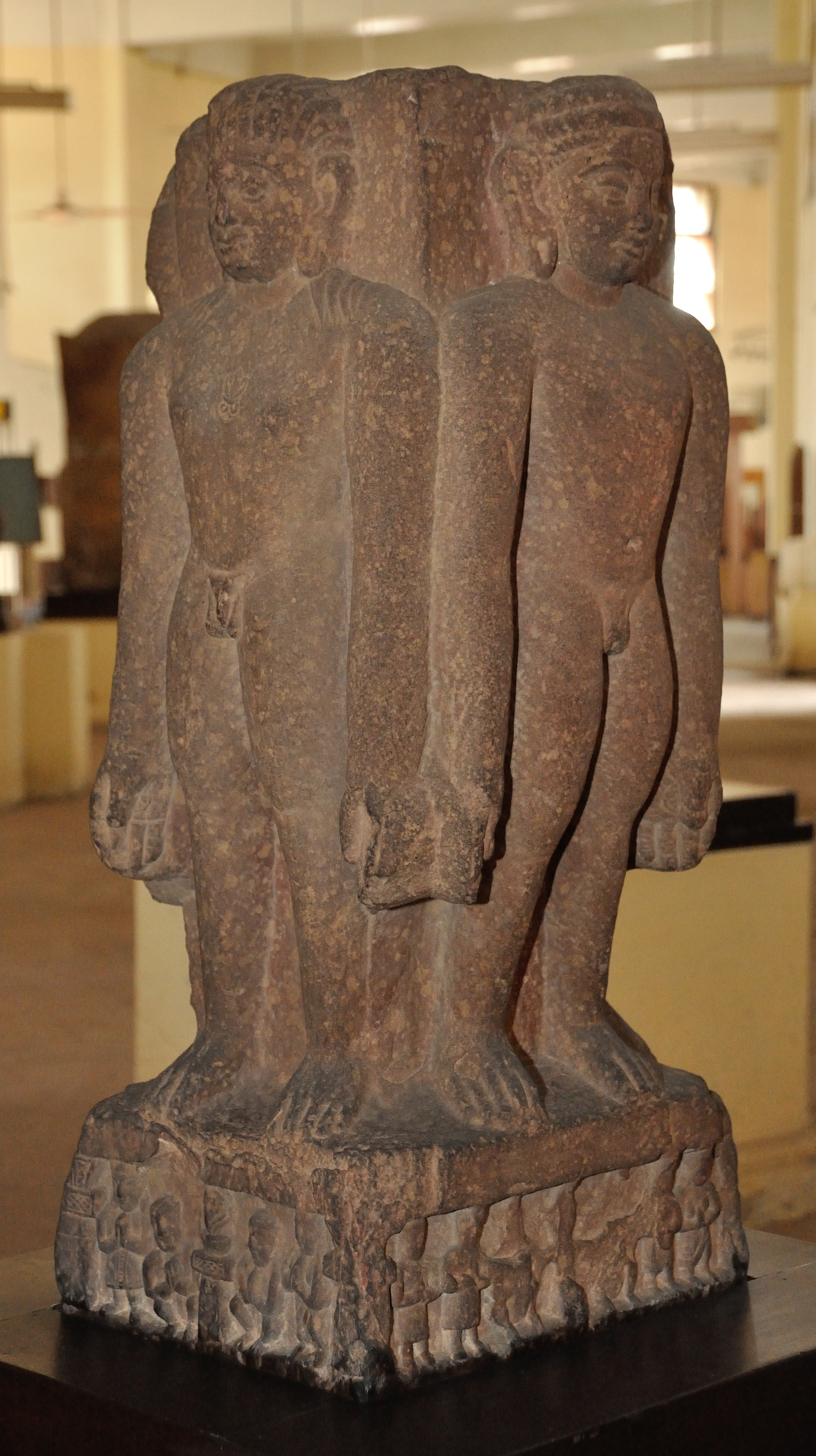
Chamukha idol, Mathura art, 1st century

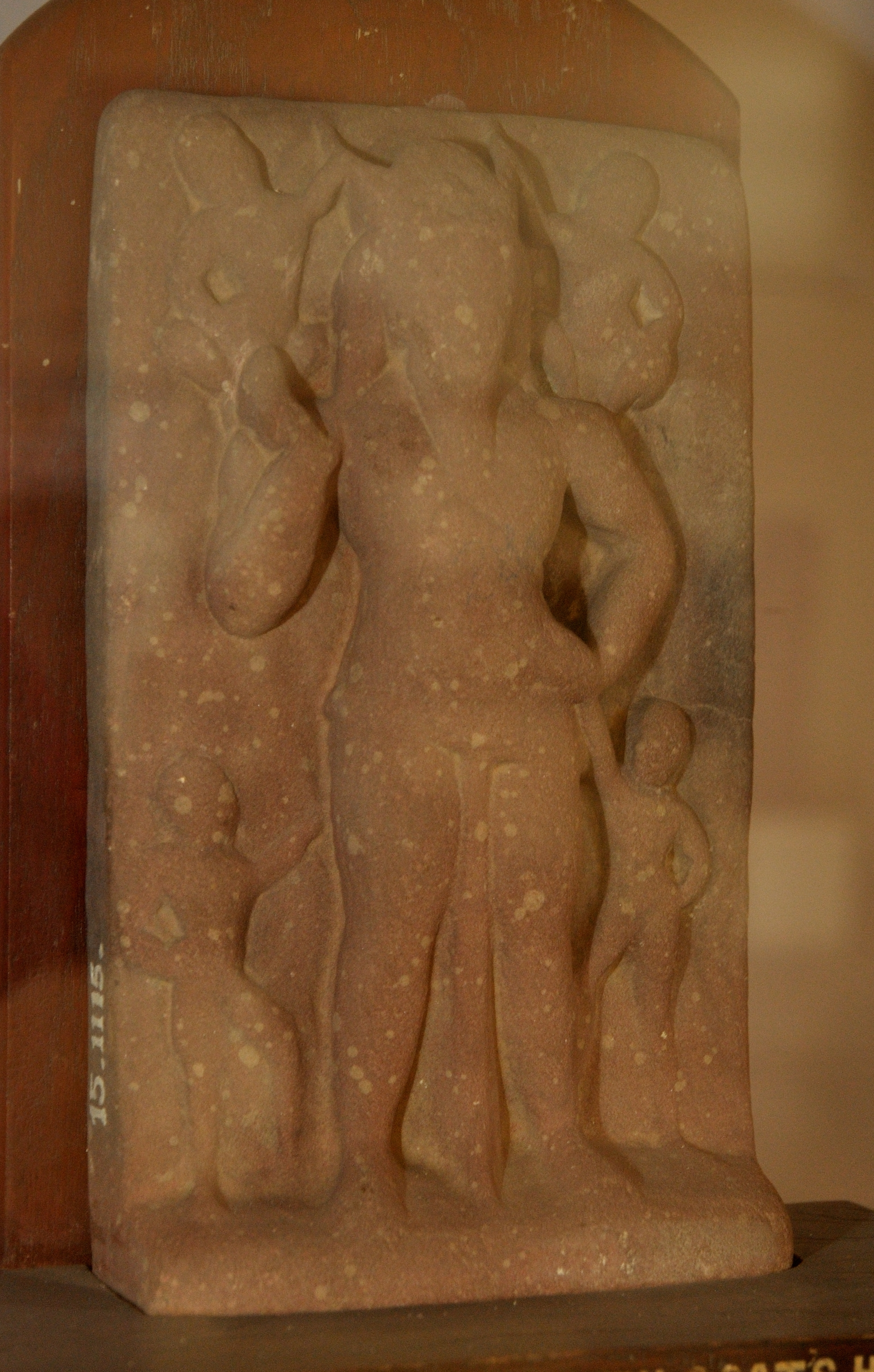
Jain god of Childbirth Naigamesha, 1st century

Chitharal Jain Monuments is the earliest Jain monument in the southernmost part of India dating back to the first century BC. The carved Kankali Tila architrave with centaurs worshipping a Jain Stupa, is Mathura art, of circa 100 BCE, showing Hellenistic influence.

The Chausa hoard is the first known bronze hoard discovered in the Gangetic valley and consists of a set of 18 Jain bronzes. The oldest of such bronzes to be found in India, experts date them between the Shunga and the Gupta period, (from 2nd, or possibly the 1st century BC, to the 6th Century AD).

=== Jain art under Kushans (2nd-3rd century CE) ===
Various dedications in the name of Kushan kings, such as Vasudeva I, with dates, appear on fragments of Jain statuary discovered in Mathura.

=== Jain art at Mathura under the Guptas ===
Pataini temple, near Unchehara, 5th century

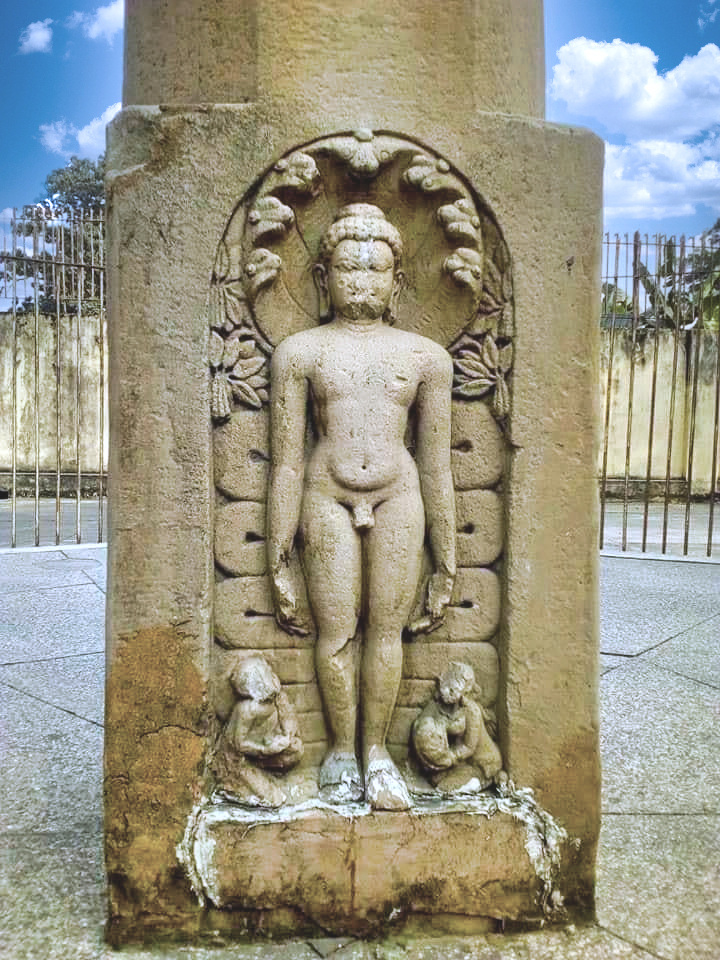
Parshvanath relief of Kahaum pillar, 5th century

Pataini temple was constructed during the reign of Gupta Empire in 5th century. A sandalwood sculpture of Mahāvīra was carved during his lifetime, according to tradition. Later the practice of making images of wood was abandoned, other materials being substituted. The bronze sculpture were famous during this period. Akota Bronzes represent a rare and important set of 68 Śvetāmbara Jain images, dating to between the 5th and 12th centuries AD, which were found in the vicinity of Akota near Baroda in the Indian state of Gujarat. Hoard includes two Jivantasvami images (representation of Mahavira who was still a prince), are widely mentioned examples of the early western Indian school of art. Vasantgarh hoard is a set of 240 bronze idols were discovered dating back to early medieval to medieval period. It is indicated by the idols that it is influenced by more styles like styles during reign of Harsha and maitraka of Valabhi. Idols of this hoard show images of tirthankar, sashandevatas (yaksha and yakshi) and Jain deities in Śvetāmbara iconography. These eyes and ornaments are frequently inlaid with silver and gold.

=== Jain art between 5th-9th century ===
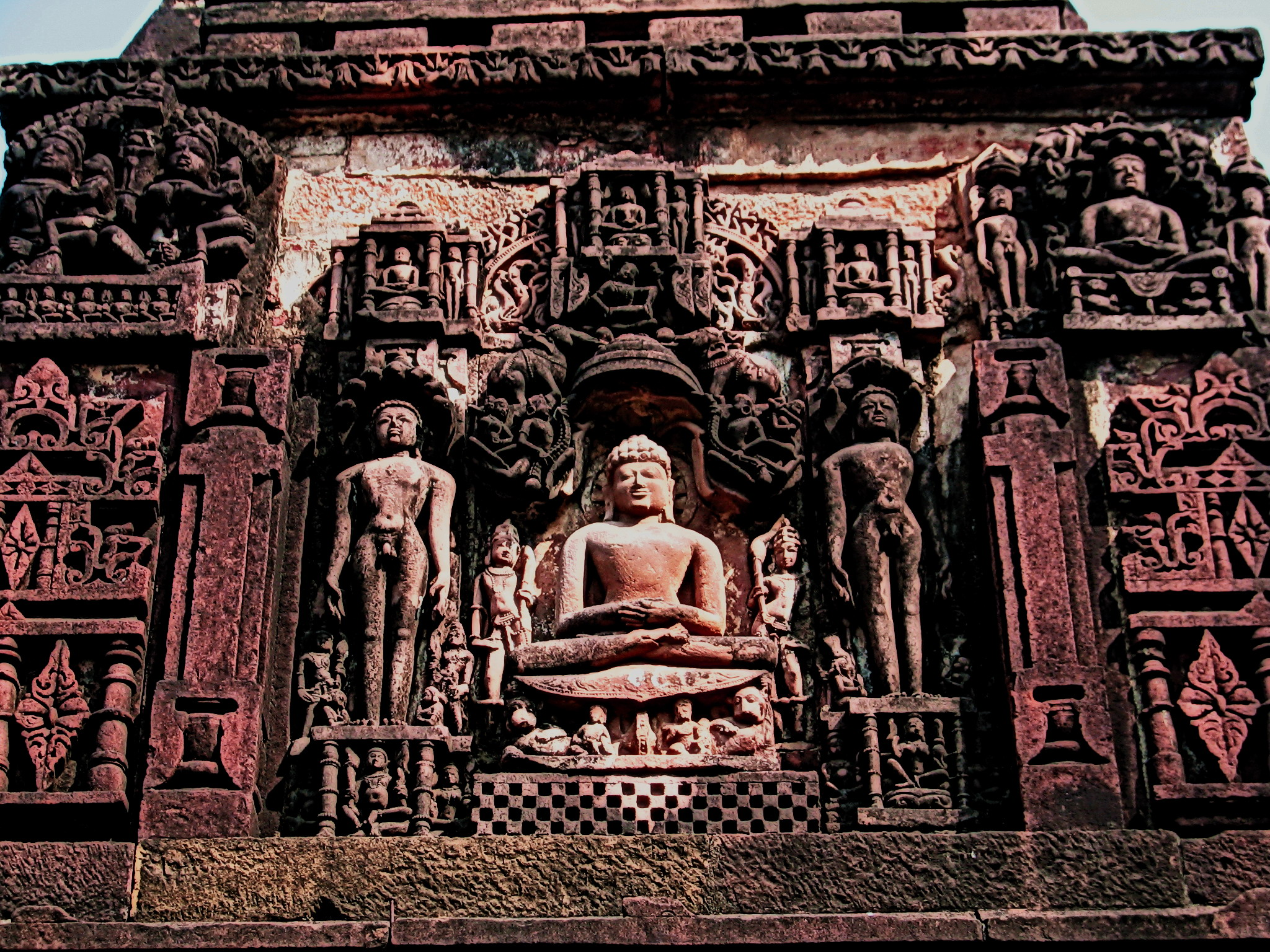
Carvings on Shantinath temple wall

Kanakagiri Jain tirth was established by Achrya Pujyapada in 5th century during the reign of Western Ganga dynasty. The temple received patronage from Hoysala, Vijayanagara, Maharaja of Mysore, and Wadiyar dynasty. The Badami cave temples and the constructed Aihole Jain monuments were built by Chalukya rulers in the 7th century, and the Jain parts of the Ellora Caves date from around this period. The earliest of the large group of Jain temples at Deogarh were begun, and in general the excavation of new rock-cut sites ceased in this period, as it also did in the other two main religions. Instead stone-built temples were erected.

Jain caves, Ellora were built around the 8th century. Māru-Gurjara architecture became popular in Jain temples. Mahavira Jain temple, Osian is the oldest surviving Jain temple in Western India and was built during the reign of Mahārāja Śrī Vatsarāja of Imperial Pratihāras.

Hansi hoard contained 58 bronze images of Jain Tirthankaras inside Asigarh Fort dating back to the 8th—9th century. These idols belong to both Digambar and Śvetāmbara sect.

=== Medieval period (8th-16th century) ===
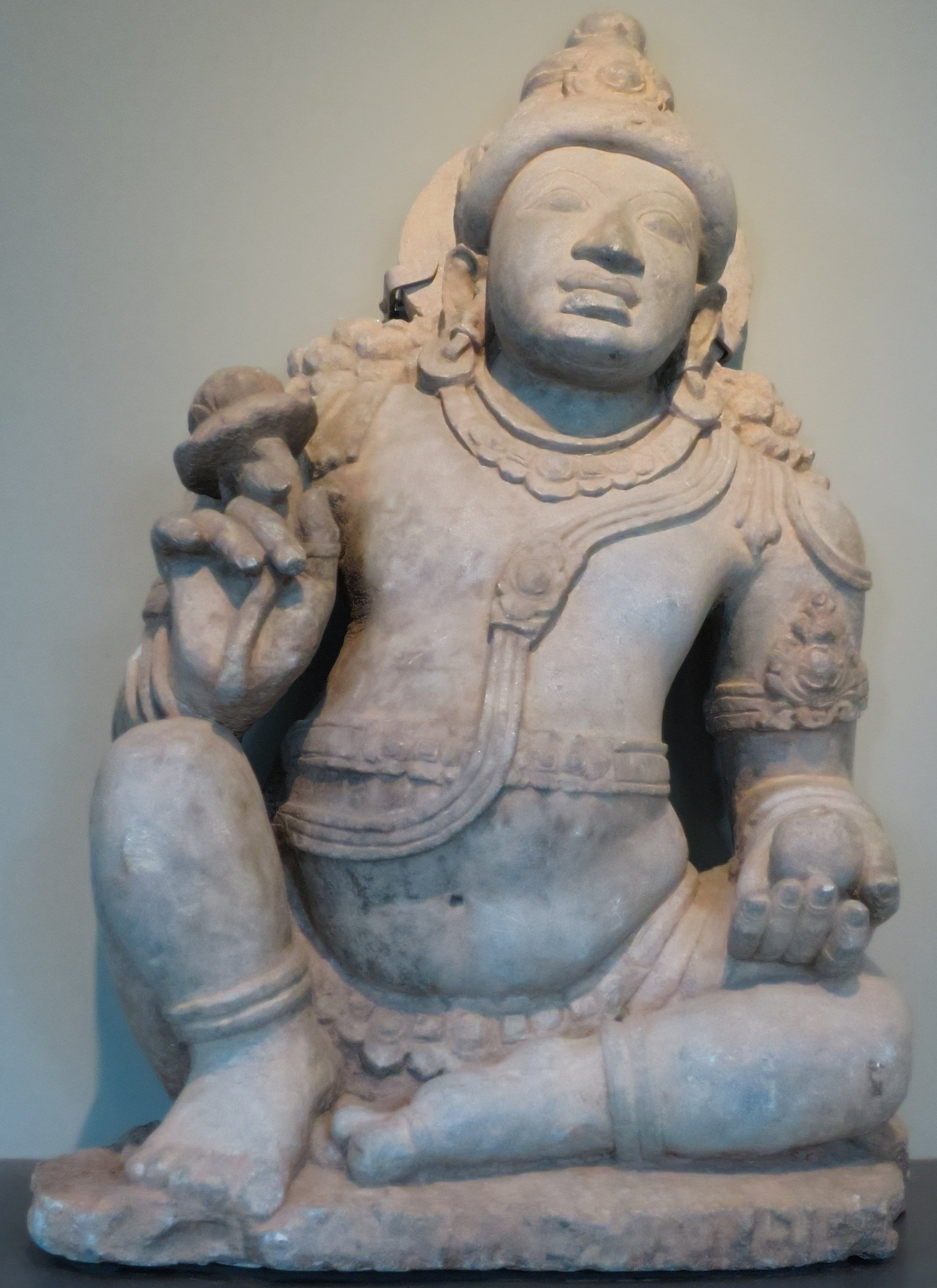
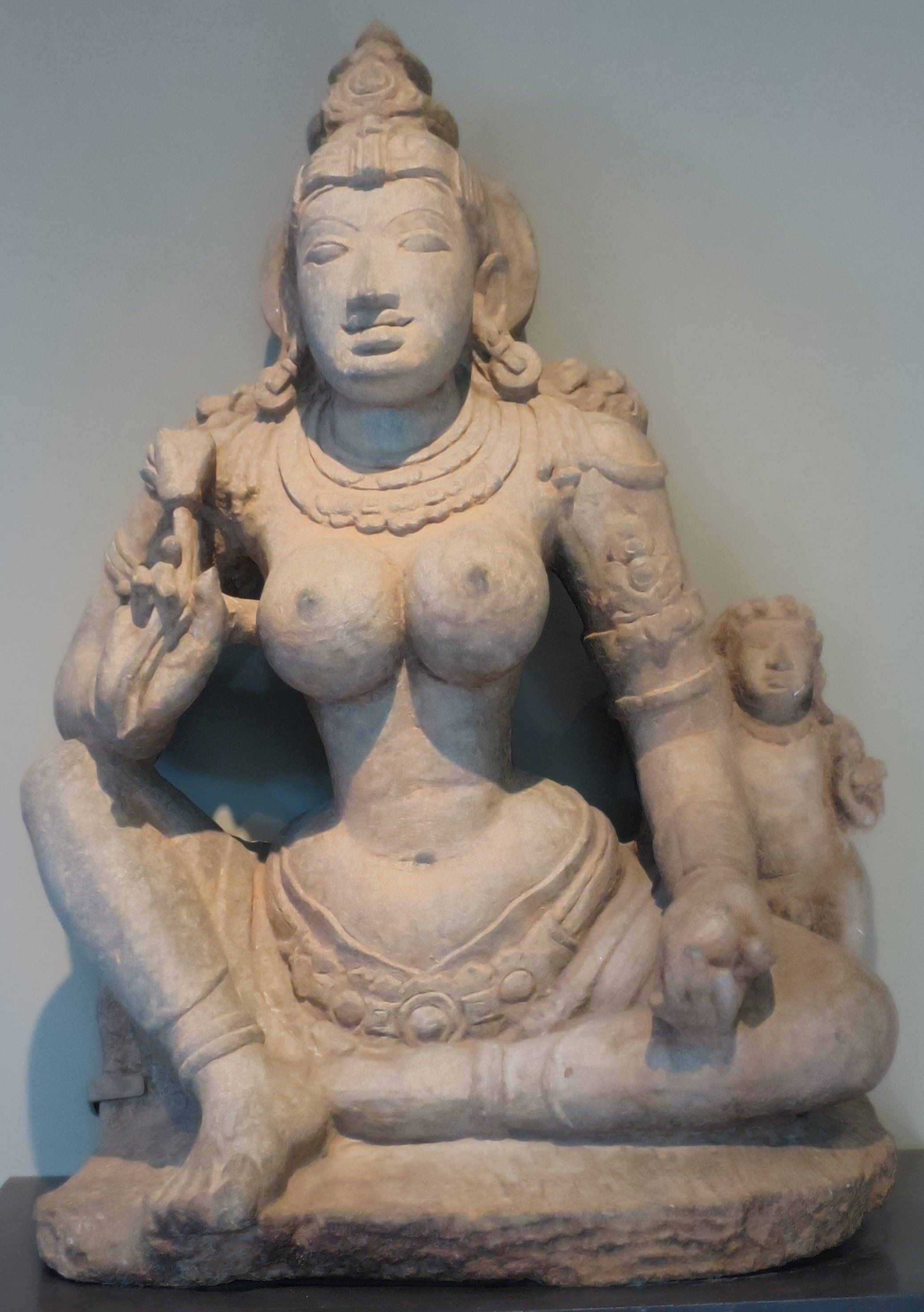
'Sarvahna and Kushmandini', 900 CE, Norton Simon Museum

The Gommateshwara statue is dedicated to the Jain figure Bahubali. It was built around 983 A.D. and is one of the largest free standing statues in the world. Mahamastakabhisheka refers to the abhiṣeka (anointment) is organised once every 12 years.

Decorated manuscripts are preserved in jaina libraries, containing diagrams from jaina cosmology. Most of the paintings and illustrations depict historical events, known as Panch Kalyanaka, from the life of the tirthankara. Aluara bronzes represent a rare and important set of bronze images dedicated to Jain tirthankaras that dates back to 11th century.

== Ayagapata and Jain stupa ==
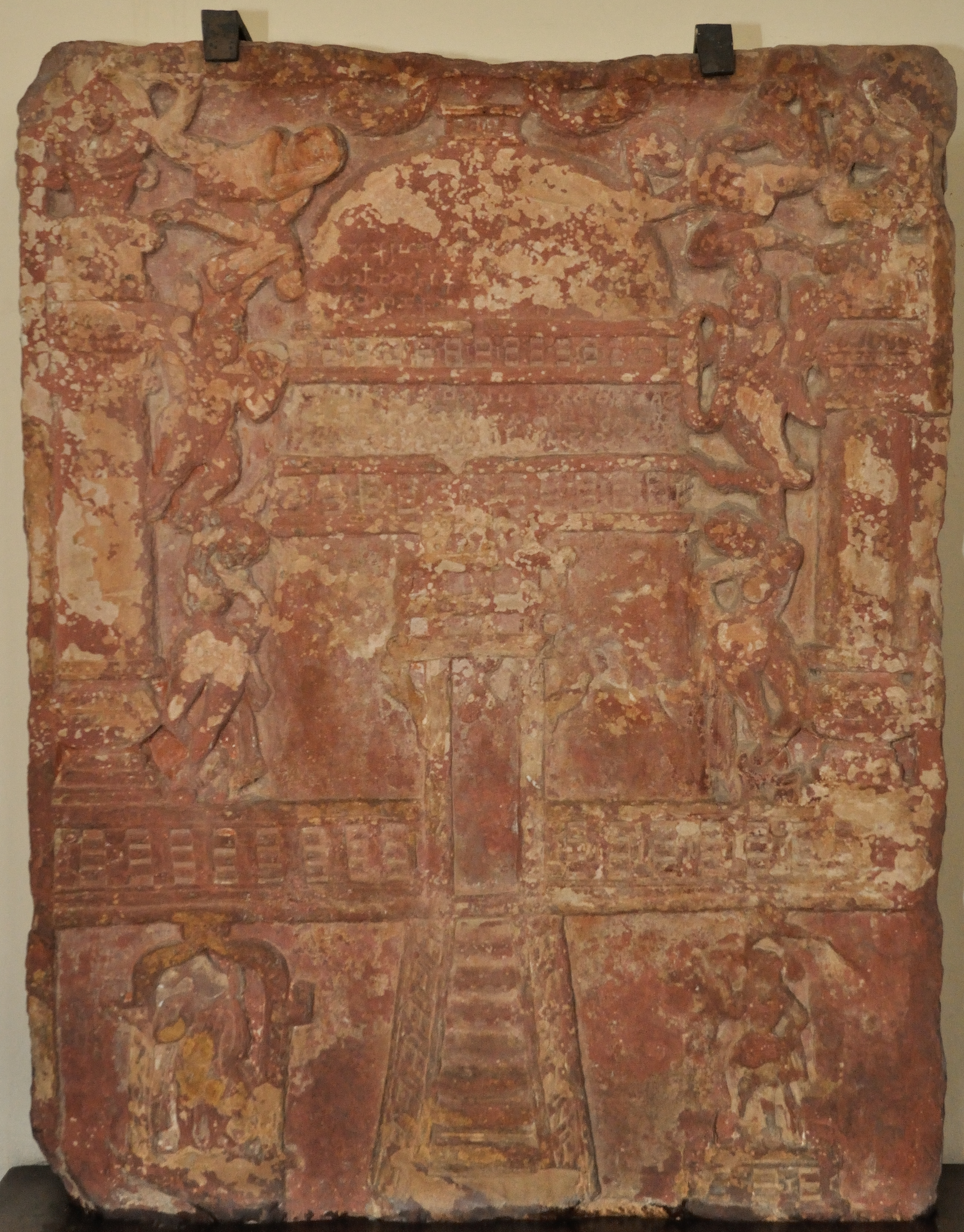
"Vasu Śilāpaṭa" ayagapata - votive plaque with Jain stupa, 1st century CE

Ayagapata is a type of votive slab associated with worship in Jainism. Numerous such stone tablets discovered during excavations at ancient Jain sites like Kankali Tila near Mathura in India. Some of them date back to 1st century C.E. These slabs are decorated with objects and designs central to Jain worship such as the stupa, dharmacakra and triratna.

A large number of ayagapata (tablet of homage), votive tablets for offerings and the worship of tirthankara, were found at Mathura. Kankali Tila tablet of Sodasa and Parsvanatha ayagapata are one of the important Ayagapata

The Jain stupa was a type of stupa erected by the Jains for devotional purposes. A Jain stupa dated to the 1st century BCE — 1st century CE was excavated at Mathura in the 19th century, in the Kankali Tila mound. Jain legends state that the earliest Jain stupa was built in the 8th century BCE, before the time of the Jina Parsvanatha.

== Sculpture ==
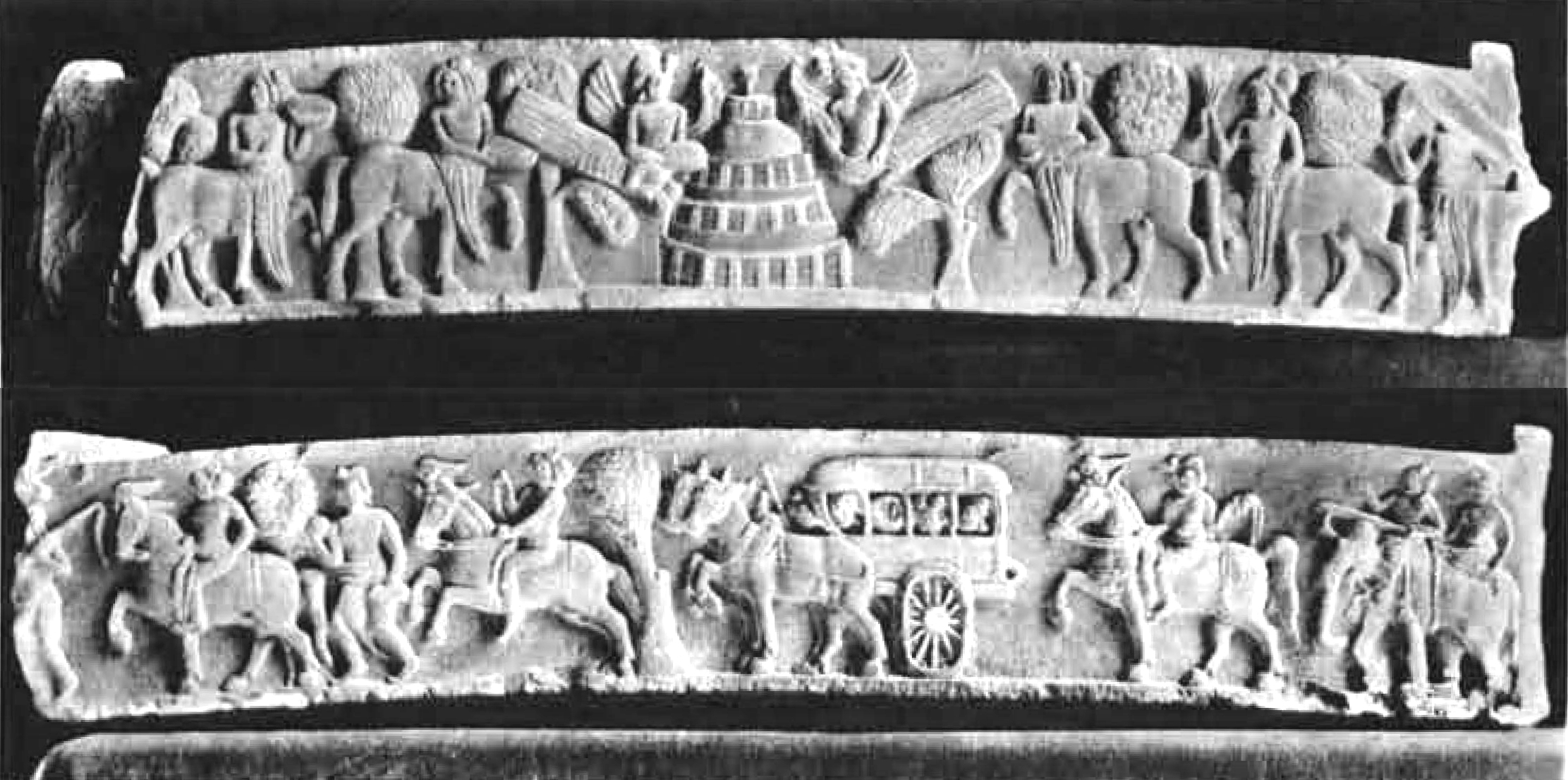
Kankali Tila architrave with Centaurs worshipping a Jain Stupa, Mathura art, c. 100 BCE

Sculpture seems to have been part of Jain tradition since the last centuries BCE, but probably was mostly in wood, which has not survived. The earliert known examples of Jain sculpture are stone architraves of the 1st century BCE, found in the Art of Mathura, particularly from the Jain mound of Kankali Tila.

Perhaps the most famous single Jain work of art is the Gommateshvara statue, a monolithic, 18 m statue of Bahubali, built by the Ganga minister and commander Chavundaraya around 983. It is situated on a hilltop in Shravanabelagola in the Hassan district of Karnataka state. This statue was voted as the first of the Seven Wonders of India.

Smaller bronze images were probably for shrines in homes. A number of medieval collections of these have been excavated, probably deposited when populations fled from wars. These include the Vasantgarh hoard (1956, 240 pieces), Akota Bronzes (1951, 68 pieces, to 12th century), Hansi hoard (1982, 58 pieces, to 9th century), and the Chausa hoard (18 pieces, to 6th century).

Each of the twenty-four tirthankara is associated with distinctive emblems, which are listed in such texts as Tiloyapannati, Kahavaali and Pravacanasaarodhara.

The Jivantasvami images represent Lord Mahavira (and in some cases other Tirthankaras) as a prince, with a crown and ornaments. The Jina is represented as standing in the kayotsarga pose.

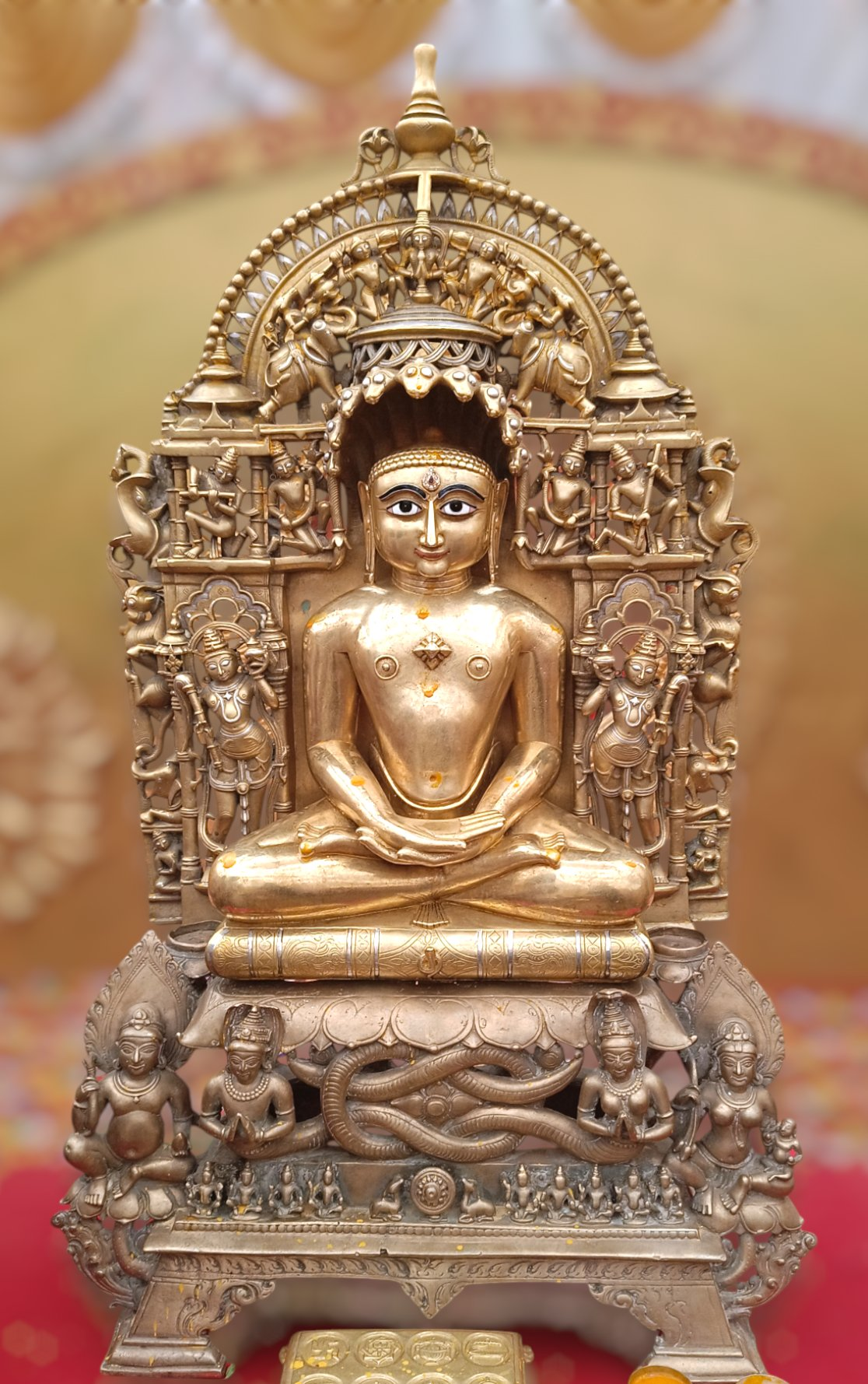
A 10th century CE idol of Parshvanatha from Patan, Gujarat

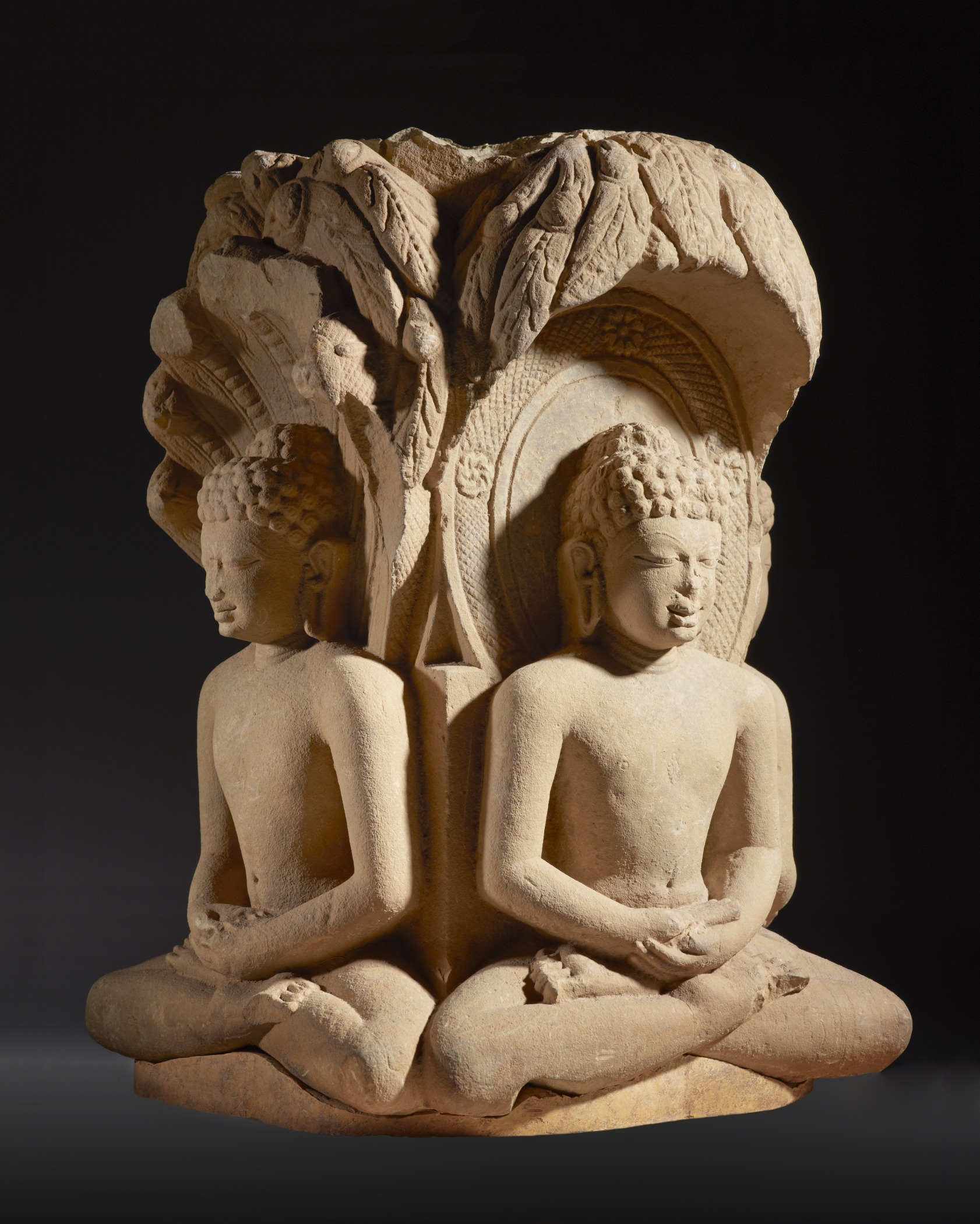
Chaumukha idol, four Jinas, 6th Century. LACMA

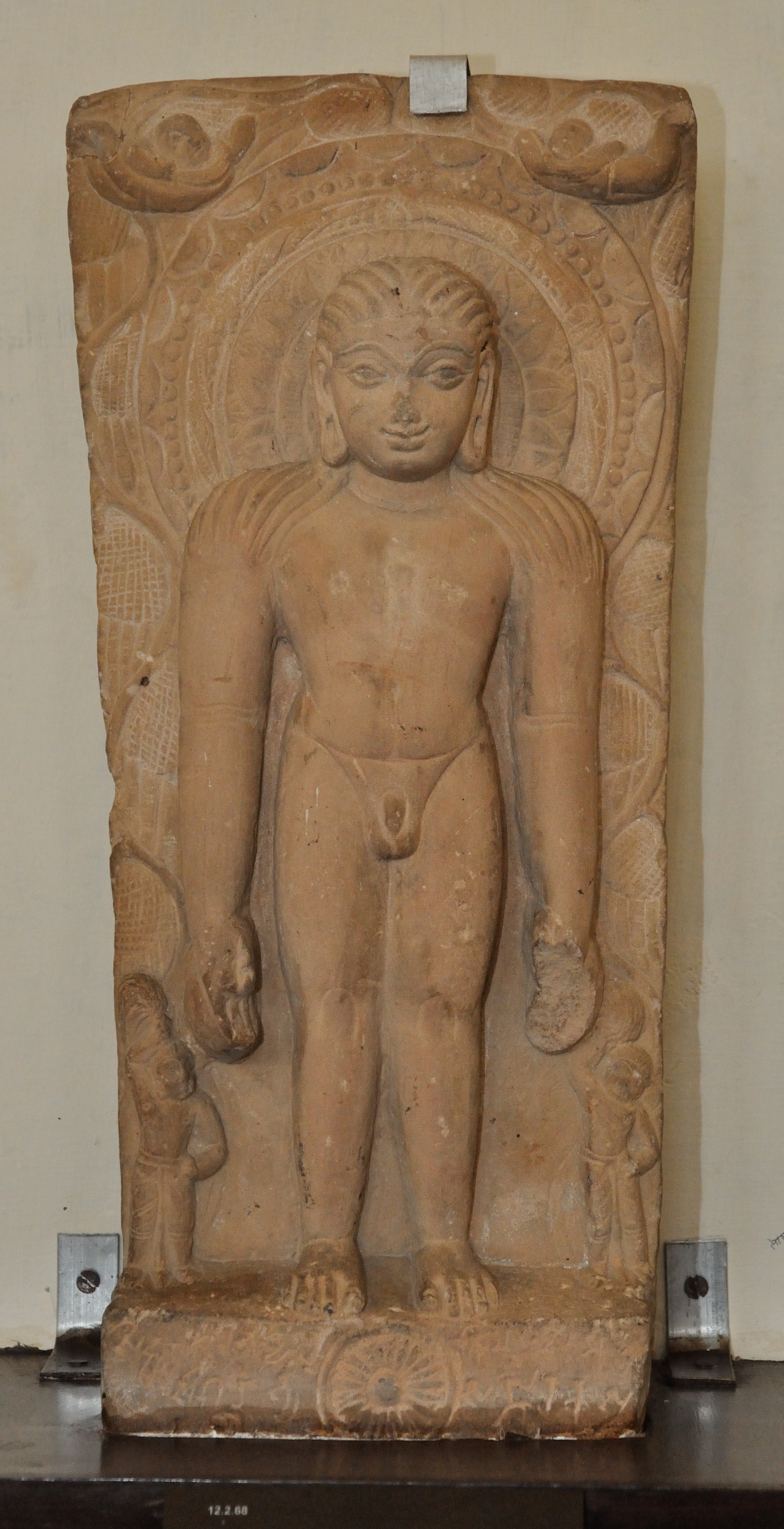
Rishabhanatha, Mathura Museum, 6th century

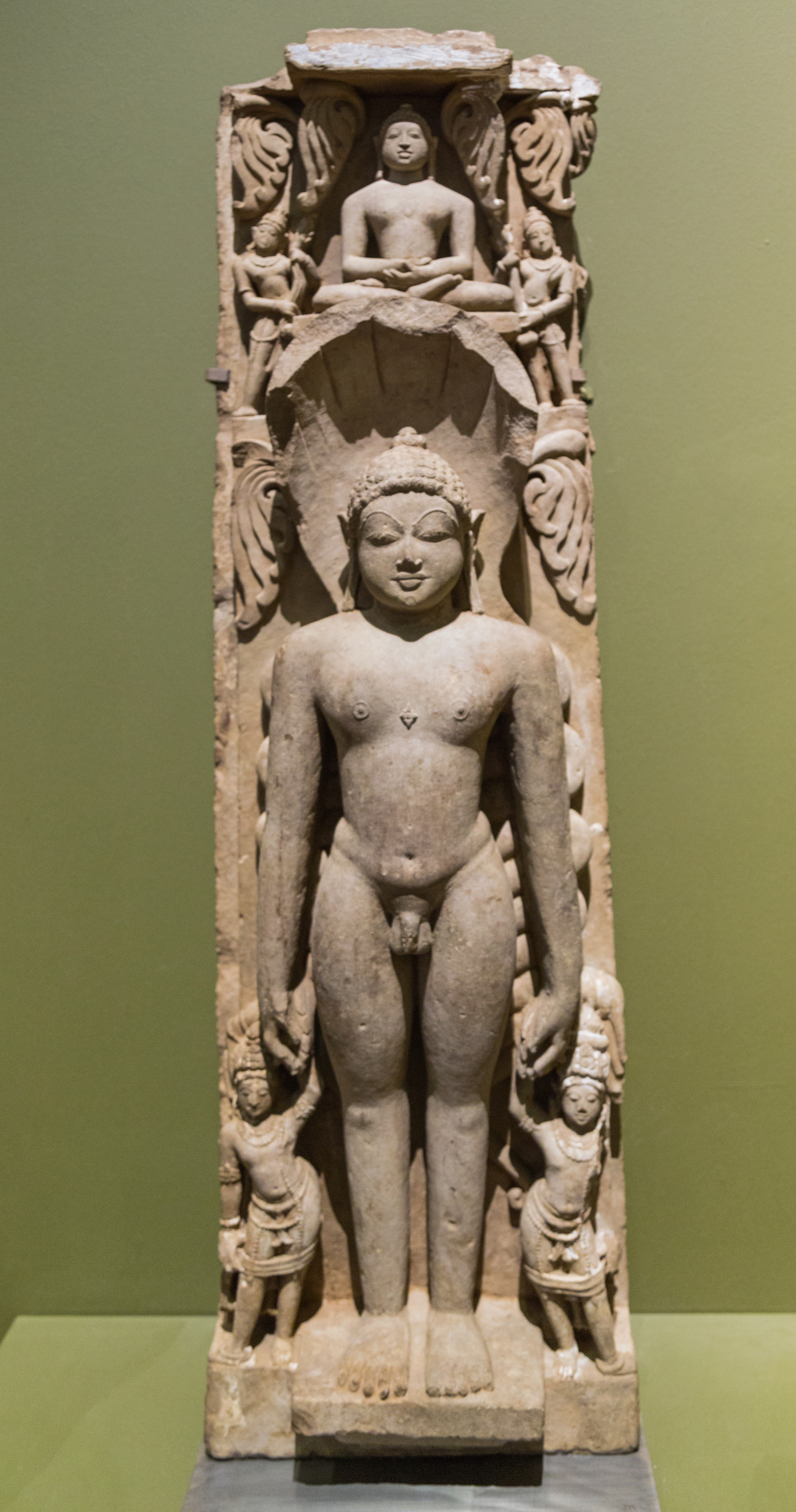
Parshvanatha, Central India, 10th or 11th century

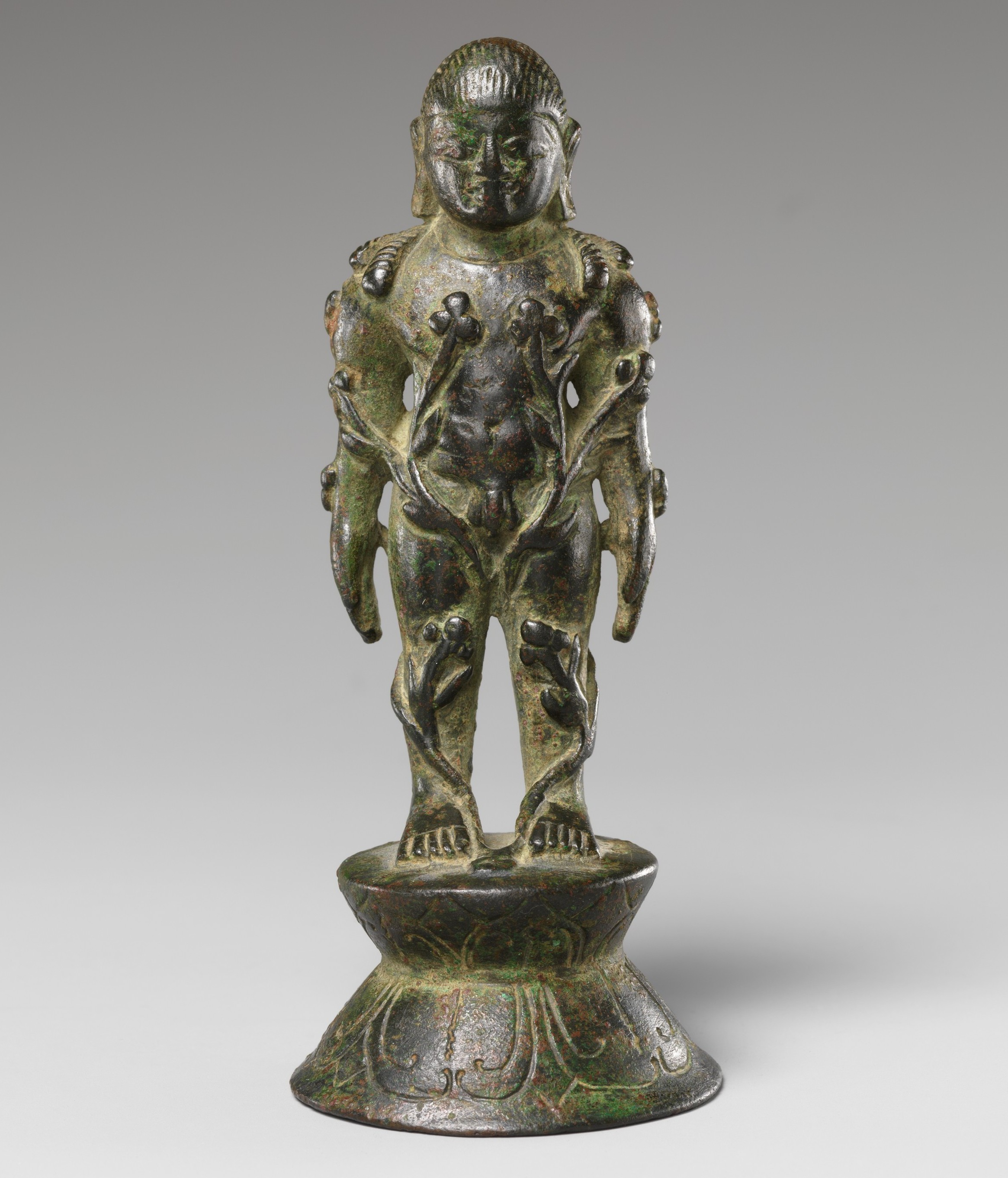
Bahubali in Kayotsarga position, Metropolitan Museum of Art (6th CE)

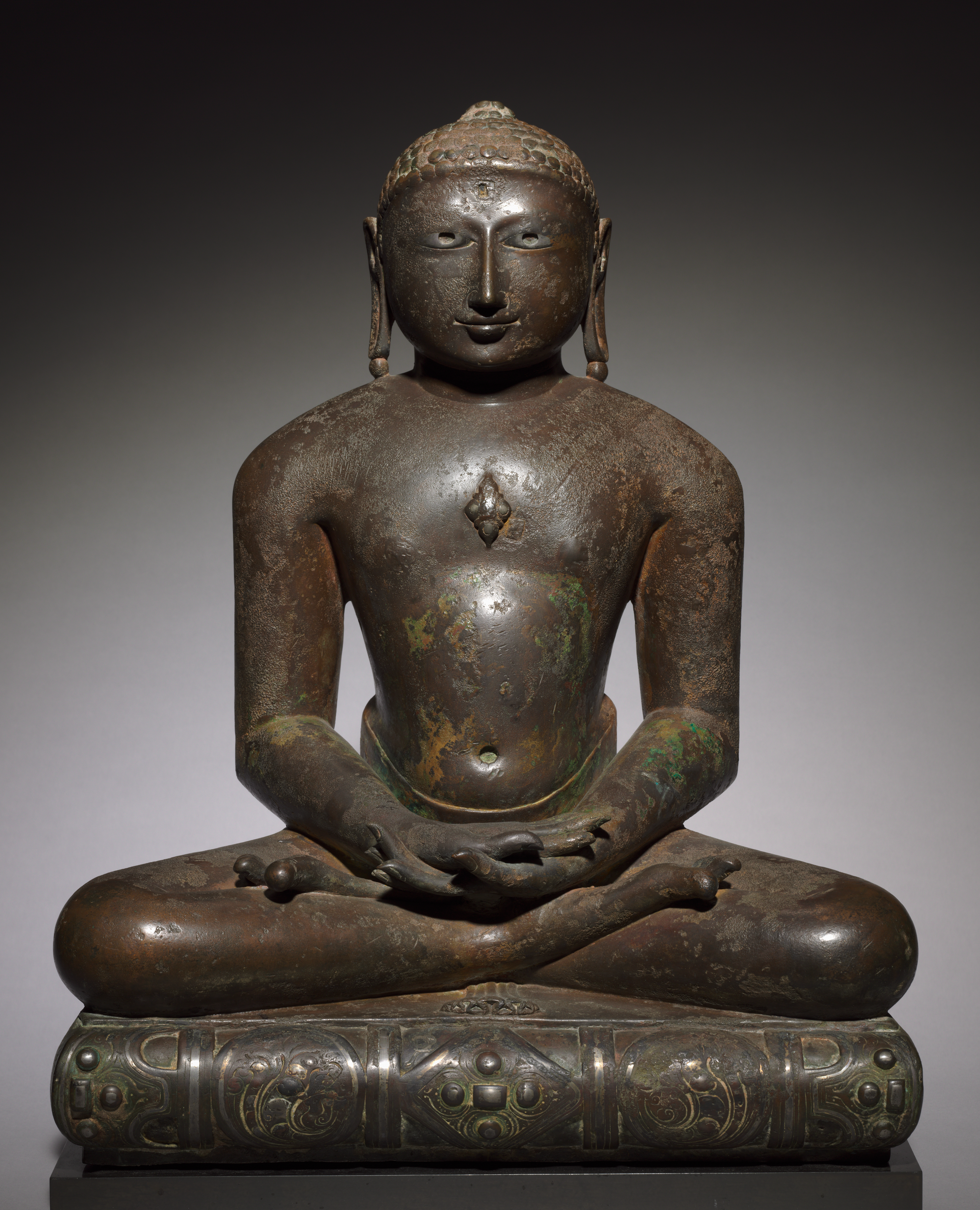
Jain tirthankara in Lotus position, Cleveland Museum of Art, 10th century

=== Monolithic statues ===
A monolithic manastambha is a standard feature in the Jain temples of Mudabidri. They include a statue of Brahmadeva on the top as a guardian yaksha.

The 58-feet tall monolithic Jain statue of Bahubali is located on Vindhyagiri Hill, Shravanabelagola built in 983 A.D. was the largest free standing monolithic statue until 2016, 108 feet monolithic idol Statue of Ahimsa(statue of first Jain tirthankar, Rishabhanatha) was erected at Mangi-tungi.

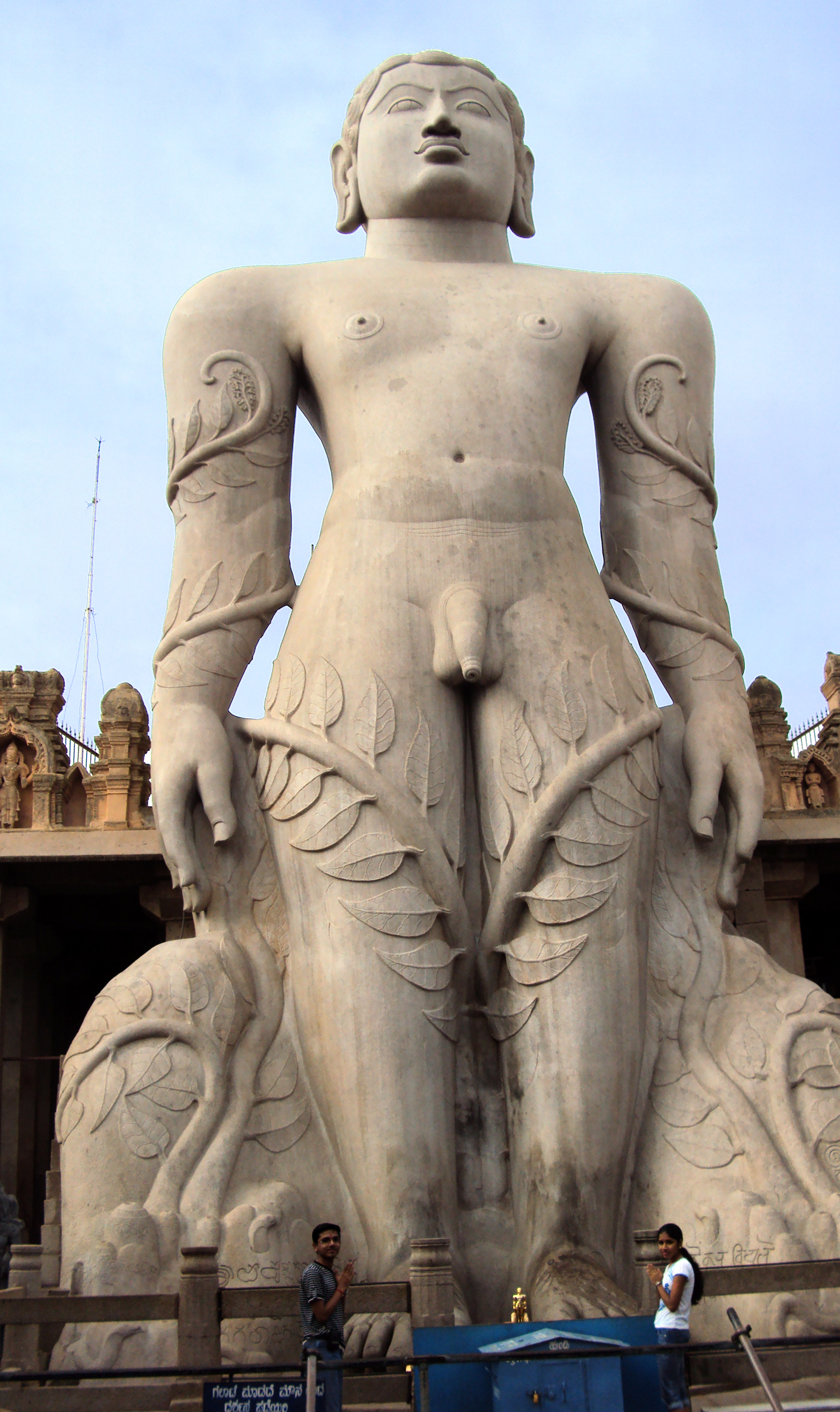
Gommateshwara statue, 18 metres (59 ft), built in 983 CE

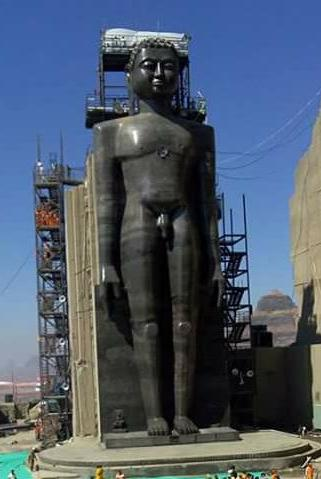
Statue of Ahimsa, 33 metres (108 ft), built in 2016

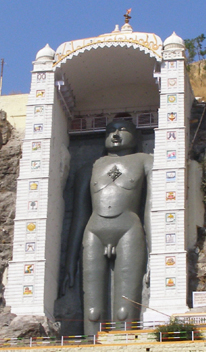
Bawangaja, 26 metres (85 ft), 15th century

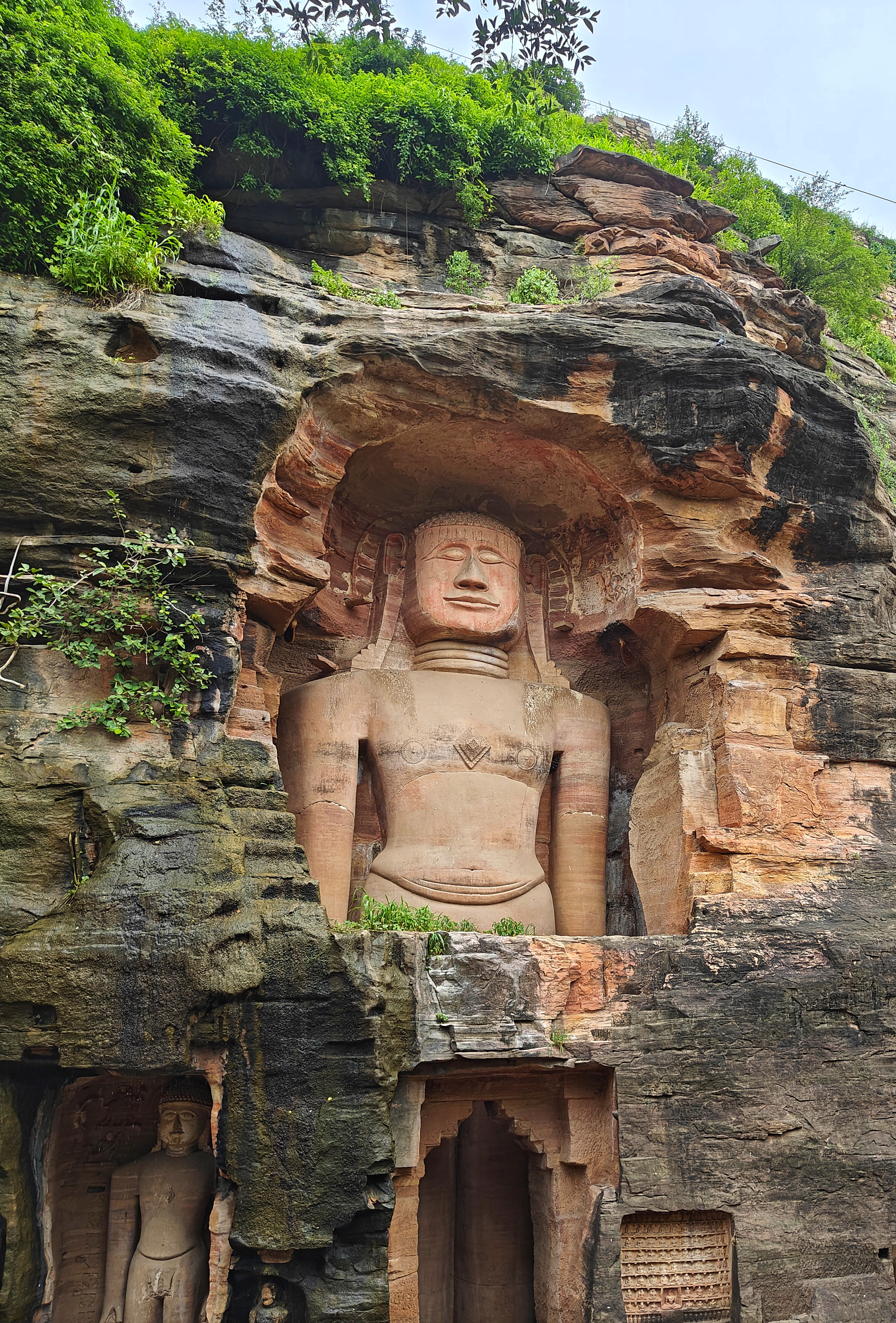
The 17.8 metres (58 ft) colossal sculptures at Siddhachal Caves

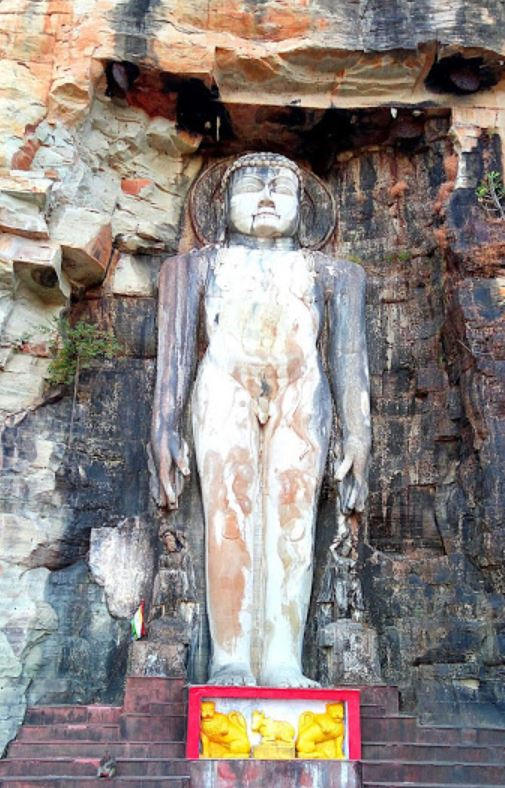
The 45 feet (14 m) tall rock cut idol at Khandargiri Jain Caves, Chanderi, 13th century

== Paintings ==
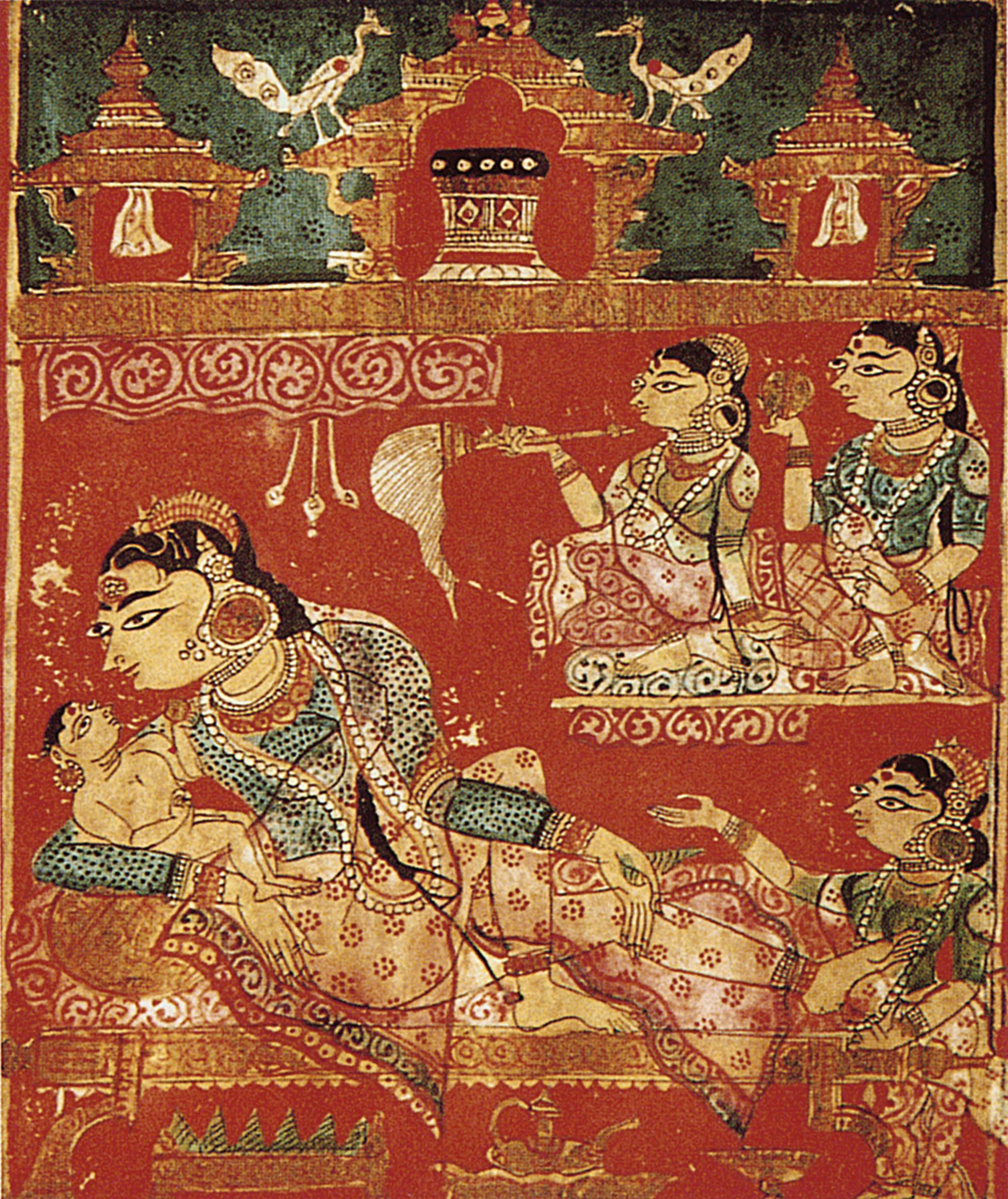
The birth of Mahavira, from the Kalpa Sūtra (c. 1375–1400 CE)

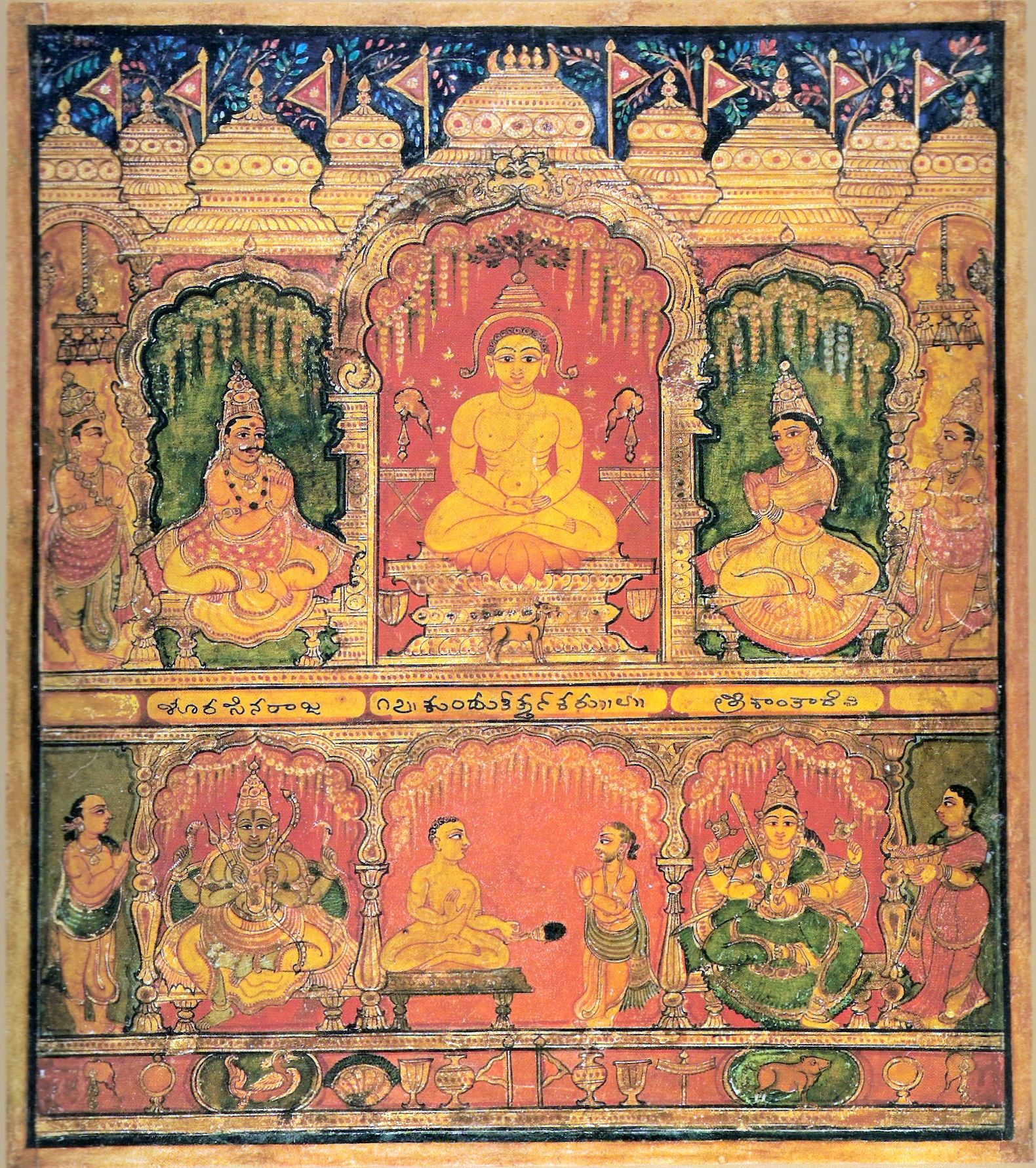
Painting Kunthanatha, Mysore temple, (c. 1825 CE)

Jain temples and monasteries had mural paintings from at least 2,000 years ago, though pre-medieval survivals are rare. In addition, many Jain manuscripts were illustrated with paintings, sometimes lavishly so. In both these cases, Jain art parallels Hindu art, but the Jain examples are more numerous among the earliest survivals. The manuscripts begin around the 11th century, but are mostly from the 13th onwards, and were made in the Gujarat region. The early manuscripts were written on sheets palm leaves as were the early paintings. Starting around the 14th century paper manufacturing was developed and on these sheets an area was designated for the painter or the entire sheet was designated for the painter. By the 15th century they were becoming increasingly lavish, with much use of gold. Most of the painted sheets were created between the 11th and 17th centuries. The Mughal ruler Akbar recruited some Jain painters among his court artists.

The manuscript text most frequently illustrated is the Kalpa Sūtra, containing the biographies of the Tirthankaras, notably Parshvanatha and Mahavira. The illustrations are square-ish panels set in the text, with "wiry drawing" and "brilliant, even jewel-like colour". The figures are always seen in three-quarters view, with distinctive "long pointed noses and protruding eyes". There is a convention whereby the more distant side of the face protrudes, so that both eyes are seen. In general, Jain painters preferred a simplified form from what is seen in nature. They depicted life as described in the manuscripts, sometimes showing entire episodes in one detailed scene. Instead of perspective and three dimensional modeling, Jain artises used different techniques to convey space and volume.

Rishabha, the first tirthankara, is usually depicted in either the lotus position or kayotsarga, the standing position. He is distinguished from other tirthankara by the long locks of hair falling to his shoulders. Bull images also appear in his sculptures. In paintings, incidents of his life, like his marriage and Indra's marking his forehead, are depicted. Other paintings show him presenting a pottery bowl to his followers; he is also seen painting a house, weaving, and being visited by his mother Marudevi.

== Samavasarana ==
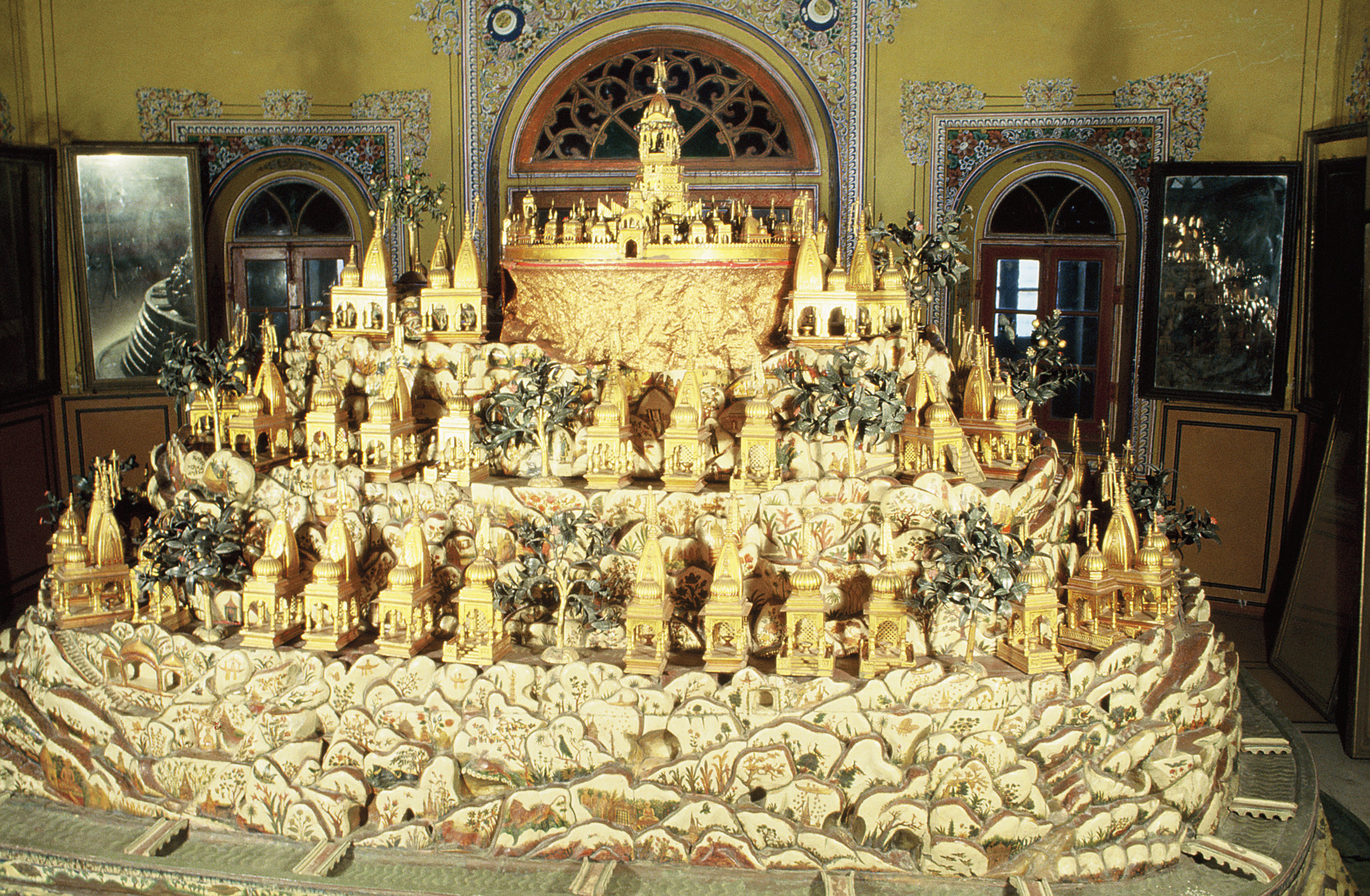
Depiction of Samavasarana inside Soniji Ki Nasiyan

Depiction of Samavasarana, the divine preaching hall of the tirthankara, is a popular subject in Jain art. Samavasarana is depicted as circular in shape with the tirthankara sitting on a throne without touching it (about two inches above it). Around the tirthankara sit the ganadharas (chief disciples) and every living beings sit in the various halls.

It can be shown in paintings, and elaborate models are also made, some occupying a whole room.

== Symbols ==
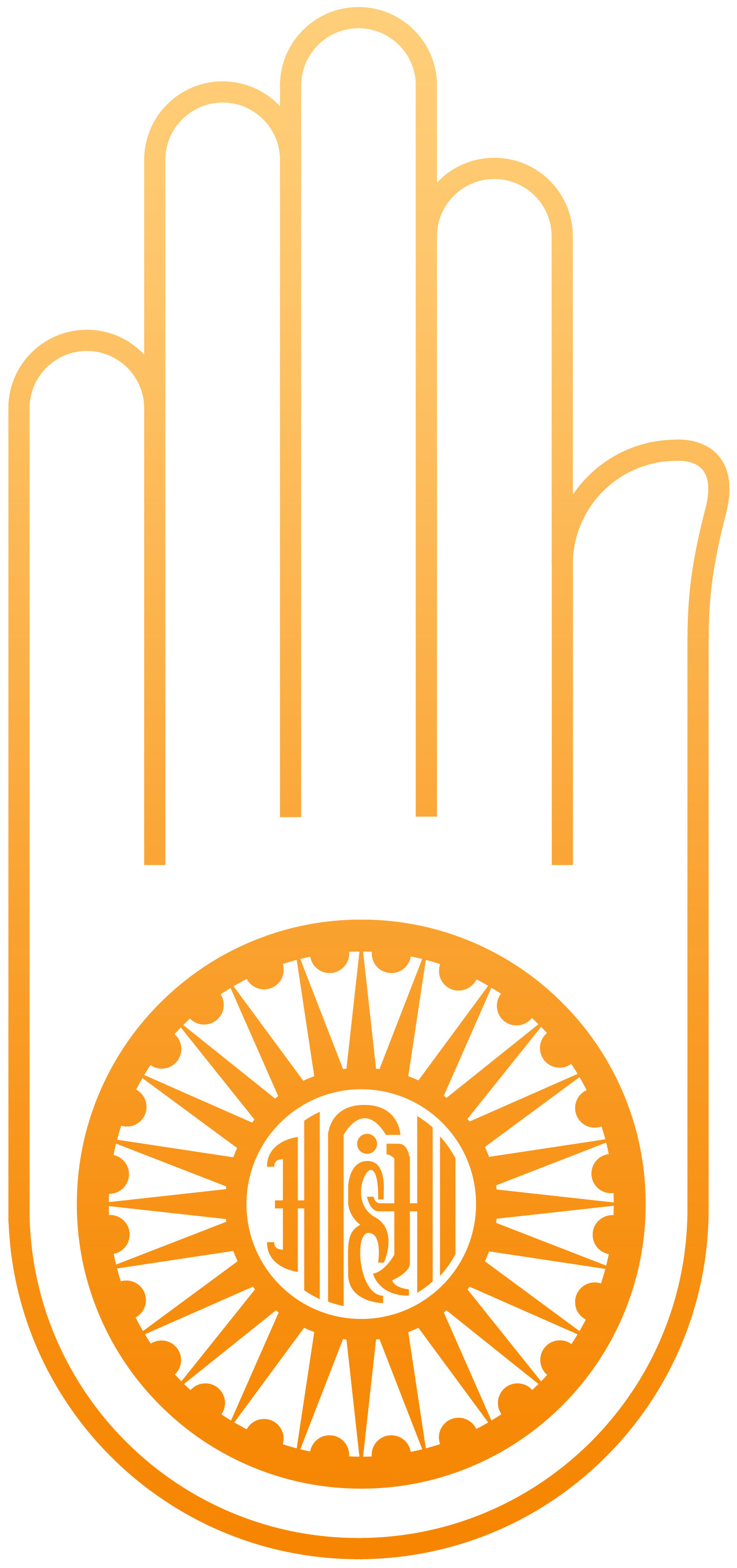
The symbol of Ahimsa in Jainism

The swastika is an important Jain symbol. Its four arms symbolise the four realms of existence in which rebirth occurs according to Jainism: humans, heavenly beings, hellish beings and non-humans (plants and animals). This is conceptually similar to the six realms of rebirth represented by bhavachakra in Buddhism. It is usually shown with three dots on the top, which represent the three jewels mentioned in ancient texts such as Tattvartha sūtra and Uttaradhyayana sūtra: correct faith, correct understanding and correct conduct. These jewels are the means believed in Jainism to lead one to the state of spiritual perfection, a state that is symbolically represented by a crescent and one dot on top representing the liberated soul.

The hand with a wheel on the palm symbolizes ahimsā in Jainism with ahiṃsā written in the middle. The wheel represents the dharmachakra (Wheel of the Dharma), which stands for the resolve to halt the saṃsāra (wandering) through the relentless pursuit of ahimsā (compassion). In Jainism, Om is considered a condensed form of reference to the Pañca-Parameṣṭhi, by their initials A+A+A+U+M (o3m). According to the Dravyasamgraha by Acharya Nemicandra, AAAUM (or just Om) is a one syllable short form of the initials of the five parameshthis: "Arihant, Ashiri, Acharya, Upajjhaya, Muni". The Om symbol is also used in ancient Jain scriptures to represent the five lines of the Ṇamōkāra Mantra.

In 1974, on the 2500th anniversary of the nirvana of Mahāvīra, the Jain community chose one image as an emblem to be the main identifying symbol for Jainism. The overall shape depicts the three loka (realms of rebirth) of Jain cosmology i.e., heaven, human world and hell. The semi-circular topmost portion symbolizes Siddhashila, which is a zone beyond the three realms. The Jain swastika is present in the top portion, and the symbol of Ahiṃsā in the lower portion. At the bottom of the emblem is the Jain mantra, Parasparopagraho Jīvānām. According to Vilas Sangave, the mantra means "all life is bound together by mutual support and interdependence". According to Anne Vallely, this mantra is from sūtra 5.21 of Umaswati's Tattvarthasūtra, and it means "souls render service to one another".

The five colours of the Jain flag represent the Pañca-Parameṣṭhi and the five vows, small as well as great: The Ashtamangala are a set of eight auspicious symbols, which are different in the Digambara and Śvetāmbara traditions. In the Digambara tradition, the eight auspicious symbols are Chatra, Dhvaja, Kalasha, Fly-whisk, Mirror, chair, Hand fan and Vessel. In the Śvetāmbara tradition, these are Swastika, Srivatsa, Nandavarta, Vardhmanaka (food vessel), Bhadrasana (seat), Kalasha (pot), Darpan (mirror) and pair of fish.

== See also ==
- Tirth Pat
- Jain symbols
- List of Jain inscriptions

== Notes ==
=== Sources ===
- Cort, John E. (1998), Open Boundaries: Jain Communities and Cultures in Indian History, SUNY Press, ISBN 9780791437865
- Cort, John E. (2001a), Jains in the World : Religious Values and Ideology in India, Oxford University Press, ISBN 978-0-19-513234-2
- Guy, John (January 2012), Jain Manuscript Painting, Heilbrunn Timeline of Art History. New York: The Metropolitan Museum of Art
- Harle, J.C. (1994), The Art and Architecture of the Indian Subcontinent (2 ed.), Yale University Press, ISBN 0300062176 Alt URL
- Jain, Vijay K. (2018), Ācārya Umāsvāmī's Tattvārthasūtra – With Explanation in English from Ācārya Pūjyapāda's Sarvārthasiddhi, Vikalp Printers, ISBN 978-819327262-6
- Jaganathan, Rijutha (21 October 2014). "Jain heritage at Kanakagiri". Deccan Herald.
- Jansma, Rudi; Jain, Sneh Rani (2006), Introduction to Jainism, Jaipur: Prakrit Bharti Academy, ISBN 978-81-89698-09-6
- Jain, Vijay K. (2012), Acharya Amritchandra's Purushartha Siddhyupaya: Realization of the Pure Self, With Hindi and English Translation, Vikalp Printers, ISBN 978-81-903639-4-5
- Kumar, Sehdev (2001), Jain Temples of Rajasthan, Abhinav Publications, ISBN 978-81-7017-348-9
- Pereira, Jose (1977), Monolithic Jinas, Motilal Banarsidass, ISBN 978-81-208-2397-6
- Quintanilla, Sonya Rhie (2000), "Āyāgapaṭas: Characteristics, Symbolism, and Chronology", Artibus Asiae, 60 (1): 79–137, doi:10.2307/324994, JSTOR 3249941
- Robinson, Thomas Arthur (2006), World Religions, Hymns Ancient and Modern Ltd, ISBN 978-0-334-04014-9
- Sangave, Vilas Adinath (2001), Facets of Jainology: Selected Research Papers on Jain Society, Religion, and Culture, Mumbai: Popular Prakashan, ISBN 978-81-7154-839-2
- Settar, S. (1971), "The Brahmadeva Pillars. An Inquiry into the Origin and Nature of the Brahmadeva Worship among the Digambara Jains", Artibus Asiae, 33 (1/2): 17–38, doi:10.2307/3249787, JSTOR 3249787
- Titze, Kurt (1998), Jainism: A Pictorial Guide to the Religion of Non-Violence (2 ed.), Motilal Banarsidass, ISBN 978-81-208-1534-6
- Vallely, Anne (2013), Bullivant, Stephen; Ruse, Michael (eds.), The Oxford Handbook of Atheism, Oxford University Press, ISBN 978-0-19-166739-8
- von Glasenapp, Helmuth (1925), Jainism: An Indian Religion of Salvation [Der Jainismus: Eine Indische Erlosungsreligion], Shridhar B. Shrotri (trans.), Delhi: Motilal Banarsidass (Reprint: 1999), ISBN 978-81-208-1376-2
- Rowland, Benjamin (1967), The Art and Architecture of India: Buddhist, Hindu, Jain (3 ed.), Pelican History of Art, Penguin, ISBN 0140561021
- Ghurye, G. S. (2005), Rajput Architecture, Popular Prakashan, ISBN 9788171544462
- Quintanilla, Sonya Rhie (2007), History of Early Stone Sculpture at Mathura: Ca. 150 BCE - 100 CE, BRILL, pp. Fig. 21 and 22, ISBN 9789004155374
- Ring, Trudy; Salkin, Robert M.; Schellinger, Paul E.; Watson, Noelle (2010) [1996]. International Dictionary of Historic Places: Asia and Oceania. Vol. 5. Routledge. ISBN 978-1-884-96404-6.
- Cort, John E. (2010), Framing the Jina: Narratives of Icons and Idols in Jain History, Oxford University Press, ISBN 978-0-19-538502-1
- Collins, Charles Dillard (1988), The Iconography and Ritual of Siva at Elephanta: On Life, Illumination, and Being, SUNY Press, ISBN 9780887067730
- Bhargava, Gopal K. (2006). Land and People of Indian States and Union Territories: In 36 Volumes. Orissa, Volume 21. Gyan Publishing House. ISBN 9788178353777.
- Krishan, Yuvraj; Tadikonda, Kalpana K. (1996), The Buddha Image: Its Origin and Development, Bharatiya Vidya Bhavan, ISBN 9788121505659
- Arora, Udai Prakash (2007), Udayana, Anamika Pub & Distributors, ISBN 9788179751688
- Zimmer, Heinrich (1953) [April 1952], Campbell, Joseph (ed.), Philosophies Of India, London: Routledge & Kegan Paul Ltd, ISBN 978-81-208-0739-6
- Owen, Lisa (2012), Carving Devotion in the Jain Caves at Ellora, BRILL Academic, ISBN 978-90-04-20630-4
- Sangave, Vilas Adinath (1980), Jain Community: A Social Survey (2nd ed.), Bombay: Popular Prakashan, ISBN 978-0-317-12346-3
- Shah, Umakant Premanand (1995), Studies in Jaina Art and Iconography and Allied Subjects in Honour of Dr. U.P. Shah, Abhinav Publications, ISBN 9788170173168
- Shah, Umakant Premanand (1987), Jaina-rūpa-maṇḍana: Jaina iconography, Abhinav Publications, ISBN 978-81-7017-208-6
- Jain, Jyotindra; Fischer, Eberhard (1978), Jaina Iconography, vol. 12, BRILL, ISBN 9789004052598
- Srinivasan, Doris (1997), Many Heads, Arms, and Eyes: Origin, Meaning, and Form of Multiplicity in Indian Art, BRILL, ISBN 9789004107588
- Wiley, Kristi L. (2009), The a to Z of Jainism, Scarecrow Press, ISBN 9780810868212
- Pal, Pratapaditya (1986). Indian Sculpture: Circa 500 B.C.-A.D. 700. Indian Sculpture: A Catalogue of the Los Angeles County Museum of Art Collection. Vol. 1. University of California Press. ISBN 9780520059917.
- "Bagawati Temple (Chitral)". Thrissur Circle, Archaeological Survey of India. Archived from the original on 19 March 2016.
- "108-Ft Tall Jain Teerthankar Idol Enters 'Guinness Records'". NDTV. 6 March 2016.
- "Delegates enjoy a slice of history at Śravaṇa Beḷgoḷa". The Hindu. Chennai. Staff Correspondent. 1 January 2006. Archived from the original on 19 March 2023.
