= Akota Bronzes =

Set of Jain sculptures

Coordinates: 22.2951°N 73.1686°E

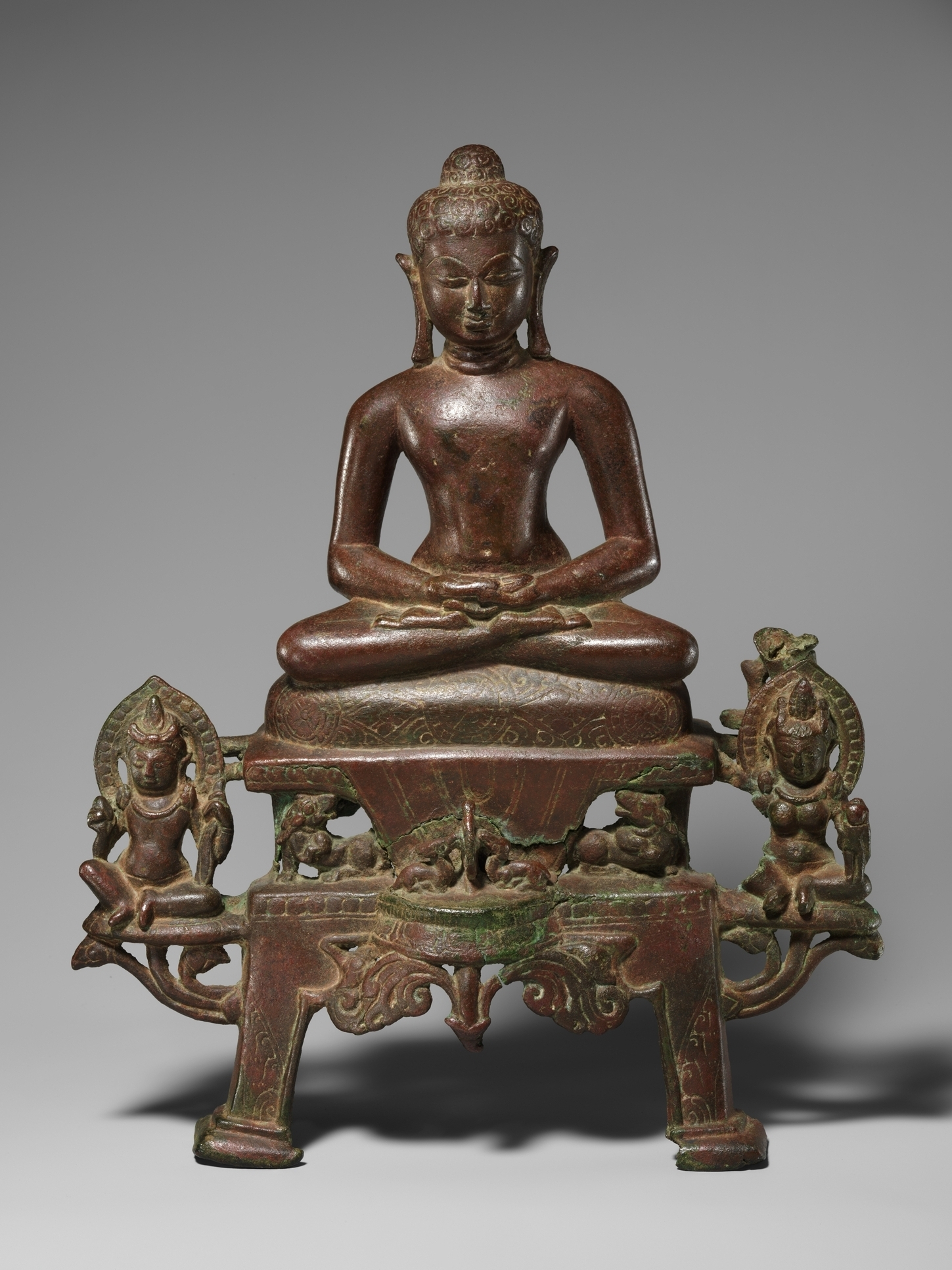
- Lord Neminatha, MET museum, 7th century

- Location in Gujarat Location in India
- Year: 6th century - 12th century
- Medium: Bronze

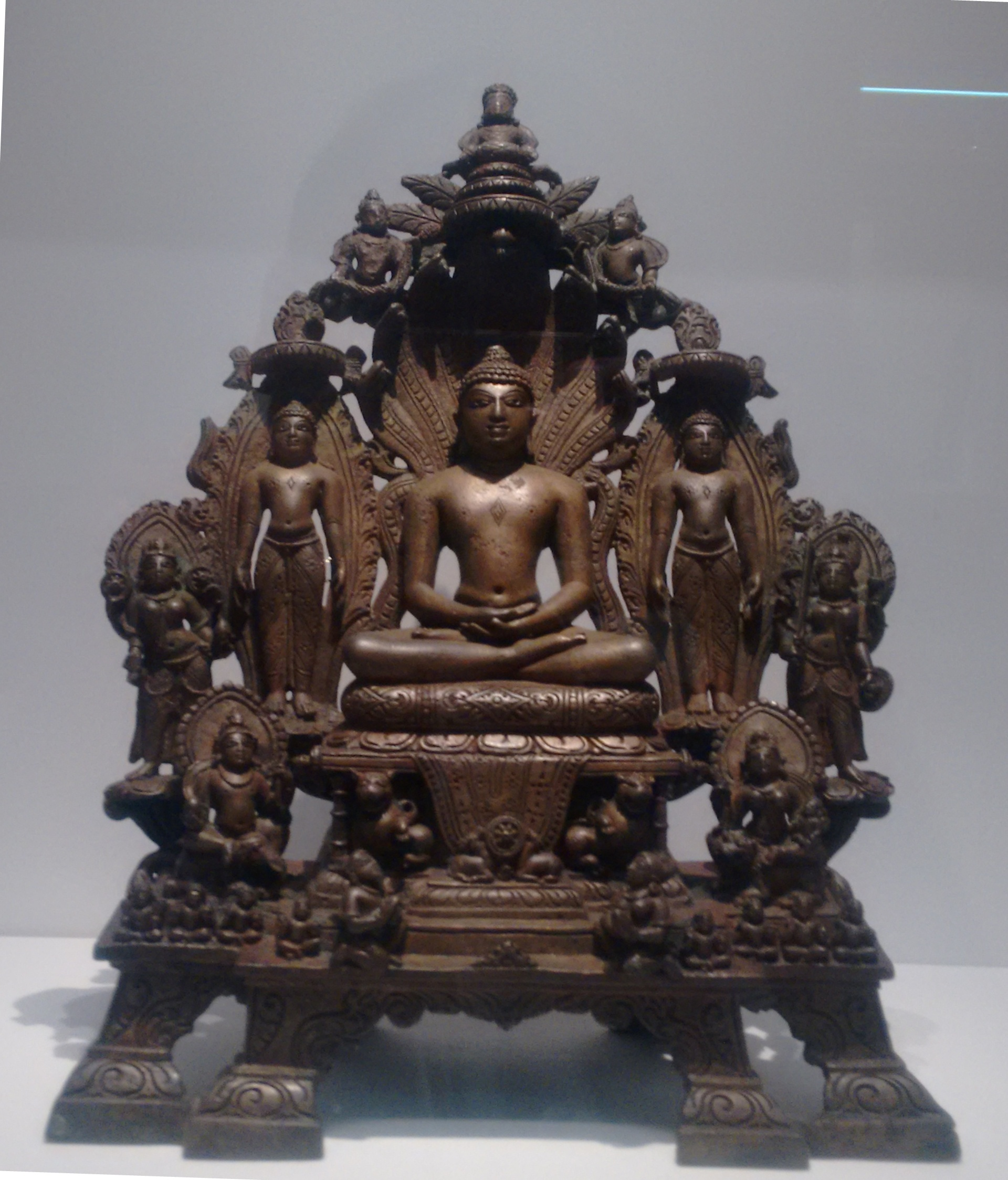
Lord Parsvanatha, National Museum, New Delhi, 9th century.

The Akota Bronzes represent a rare and important set of 68 Jain images, dating to between the 6th and 12th centuries AD, which were found in the vicinity of Akota near Baroda in the Indian state of Gujarat. It includes rare Gupta period bronzes that have been widely used for comparison of Gupta period art.

Akota (formerly Ankottaka) was a major centre of Jainism in the 5th century AD and is mentioned in texts. The hoard provides information on metallic art and development of metal technology during Gupta, post-Gupta and medieval period.

== Discovery ==
The images were dug out sometime before June 1951. A University of Baroda professor brought five of them to archaeologist Umakant Premanand Shah for examination. Shah eventually purchased most of the images from local individuals and presented them to M. S. University of Baroda, which are now in the Baroda Museum.

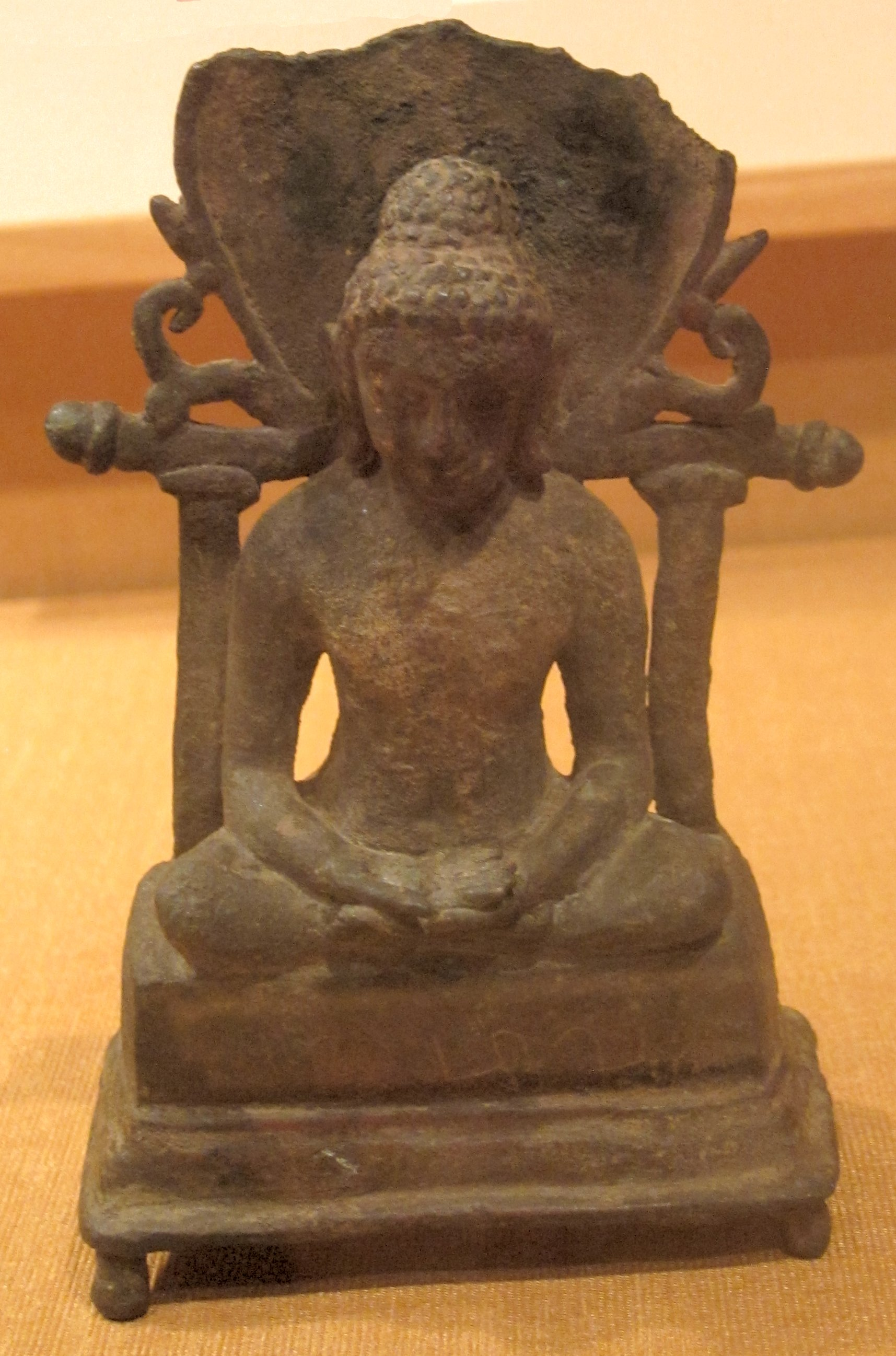
7th-century Tirthankar image, Akota, at Honolulu Academy of Arts

Only two of the images are dated. Shah dated the rest of them on palaeographic basis. They range from the 5th to 12th centuries. They may have belonged to the Vasatika of Arya Rath established in Kshatrapa era. None of the images date after 1100 AD, suggesting that they were buried for safeguarding from the invasion of Gujarat by Alp Khan, a general of Alauddin Khalji.

== Major images ==
Two images of Jivantasvami, (representation of Mahavira who was still a prince), are widely mentioned examples of the early western Indian school of art. One of them is specifically inscribed as Jivantasvami installed by Nagisvari, which represents early phase of the Gupta style.

Two images of Tirthankara (one of Parsvanatha) are from the post-Gupta period. An image inscribed as donated by Sadhu Sarvadeva include eight standing figures representing the eight planets, on both sides of the dharmachakra. Notable images of Ambika on lion and standing Sarasvati are from the same period.

A Chamardharini (Chaurie Bearer) stands in tribhanga pose on a carefully carved lotus pedestal. It represents a western India school during the Chaulukya period between the 11th and 12th centuries.

Earliest image of Rishabhanatha with Yaksha and Yakshini was found in Akota.

== Inscriptions ==
The inscriptions mention these monastic lineages

- Nivrati Kula
- Chandra Kula
- Vidyadhara Kula
- Nagendra Kula
- Gohadra Kula

Modern Jnatis of shravakas are not mentioned, with the exception of a late image of about AD 1000 which mentions Modh Gachchha. However an earlier image datable to AD 600–650 refers to a sadhu (shravaka) from (nirgata) Kaserahadra. Two of the images refer to goshthikas (guild members) of weavers (salapati).

== Significance ==
The Akota bronzes are of considerable artistic and historical significance.

- The inscriptions attest the earliest use of title "Sadhu" (shahu or Shah) by the lay Jains.
- The tradition of legendary wooden Jivantasvami image is attested by the image of about 550 AD, specifically inscribed as Jivantasvami. It is regarded to be the first clothed Jain image. It was installed shortly after the Valabhi vachana presided by Devardhigani Kshamashramana in AD 453.
- Jinabhadra Gani Kshamashramana, is mentioned in the installer of the Rishabhanath image, who wrote the Visheshavashyaka Bhashya.

== Museums ==
Most of the Akota bronzes are in the Baroda Museum & Picture Gallery. There are examples in the National Museum, New Delhi, Metropolitan Museum of Art (New York), and Honolulu Academy of Arts.

== See also ==
- Jain art
- Jain Sculpture
- Chausa hoard
- Vasantgarh hoard
- Brahma from Mirpur-Khas
- Kurkihar hoard
