= Chausa hoard =

Set of Jain sculptures

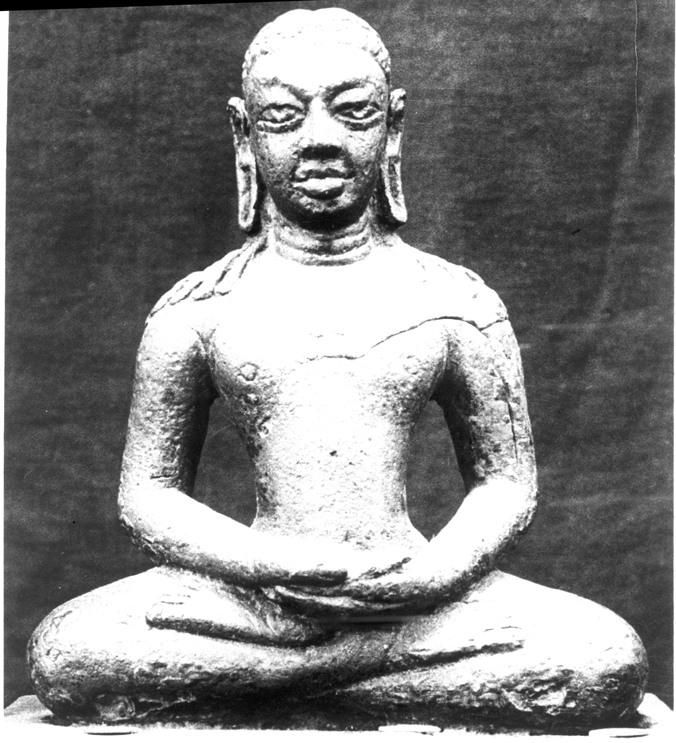
- Rishabhadeva, Bronze from Chausa, Bihar

- Location within Bihar Location within India
- 25.5075447°N 83.8823147°E

The Chausa hoard is a collection of ancient Jain Bronze sculptures. It is named after the location of the discovery: Chausa (also known as Chausagarh), which is located in the Buxar district of Bihar state, India.

== History ==
The Chausa hoard was the first known bronze hoard discovered in the Gangetic valley and consists of a set of 18 bronze sculptures. The oldest of such bronzes to be found in India, experts date them between the Shunga and the Gupta period, (from 2nd, or possibly the 1st century BC, to the 6th Century AD).

In his classification of Jain bronzes, Patrick Krueger regards them to be early type, characterized by portrayal of a single Tirthankara without a parikara.

== Major Idols ==
The hoard includes a Dharmachakra showing Dharmachakra supported by two yakshis supported by makaras; a kalpavriksha and sixteen tirthankaras. Among the tirthankaras, those of Rishabha are easily identified by the locks of hair. The bronzes currently reside in the Patna Museum.

== Related Discoveries ==
Other well-known hoards of Jain bronzes include Akota Bronzes, found in Gujarat; Vasantgarh hoard, found in Vasantgarh; Hansi hoard, found in Haryana; and Aluara bronzes, found in Bihar.

== Gallery ==
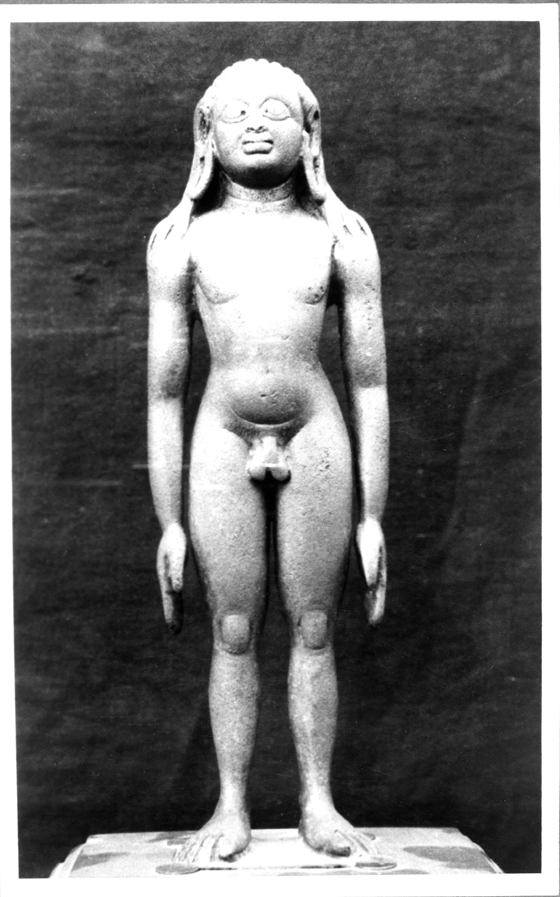
Rishabhadeva, Bronze from Chausa, Bihar

== See also ==
- Jain Sculpture
- Indian art
- Kankali Tila
