= Aluara bronzes =

Set of Jain sculptures

- Year: 11th century
- Medium: Bronze

The Aluara Bronzes or Aluara Hoard represent a rare and important set of Jain images found in Aluara near Dhanbad region of Bihar, in Eastern India.

== History ==
These bronze images dedicated to Jain tirthankaras that dates back to 11th century. They are currently kept in Patna Museum for preservation.

== Major Idols ==
The idol of Kunthunatha, the 17th tirthankara was found in padmasan posture with symbol of goat punched into the simhasan (pedestal).

The image of Ambika, the protector goddess of the 22nd tirthankara, Neminatha, standing in tri-bhanga posture with her two sons and lion mount.

Other well-known hoards of Jain bronzes include Akota Bronzes, found in Gujarat; Vasantgarh hoard, found in Vasantgarh; Hansi hoard, found in Haryana; and Chausa hoard, found in Bihar.

== See also ==
- Vasantgarh hoard
- Akota Bronzes
- Chausa hoard
- Hansi hoard
- Lohanipur torso
