= Vasantgarh hoard =

Set of Jain sculptures

- Year: 6th century - 11th century
- Medium: Bronze

The Vasantgarh hoard contains 240 Jain bronze idols discovered in Vasantgarh, located in the Sirohi District of Rajasthan, India, and dating back to early Medieval India.

== Description ==
In 1956, 240 bronze idols were found dating back to early Medieval India. The large number of idols indicate that Jainism had taken a strong foothold in the area between the 6th and 11th centuries. The Vasantgarh hoard, along with the Akota and Devni Mori bronzes, are important hoards found in Gujarat and Kathiawar province.

The Akota and Vasantgarh bronzes were predominately influenced by Gupta and Gandhara styles seen during the reigns of Harsha and the Maitraka dynasty of Valabhi. Images of the Vasantgarh include Jain tirthankar, sashandevatas (yaksha and yakshi) and deities bearing Jain iconography. The images are generally small in size and crafted by the cire-perdue (lost-wax casting) process. Eyes and ornaments are frequently inlaid with silver and gold.

== Major images ==
An important figure of the Vasantgarh hoard is one of the Goddess Saraswati wearing an ornate crown, standing on a lotus pedestal, holding a lotus stem in one hand and a manuscript in the other. She has been placed inside the Mahavir temple of Pindwara and worshipped as Chakreshvari. Similar iconography of Saraswati was found in the Akota bronzes. Two beautiful images of Rishabhanatha dating back to 6th and 7th century AD, a sat-tirthika dated to 998 AD, bronze images of parshvanatha with sarvanha and ambika devi were also found in Vasantgarh. A chaturvimsatipatta of Adinatha and tritirthi Parshvanatha are dated respectively to 1066 and 1078 CE.

== See also ==
- Hansi hoard
- Aluara bronzes
