= Umakant Premanand Shah =

Indian writer (1915–1988)

- Born: 20 March 1915; Baroda
- Died: November 1988 (aged 73)
- Occupations: author, scholar

Umakant Premanand Shah was a scholar from India.

== Life ==
Umakant was born in Baroda on 20 March 1915. He completed his doctoral thesis on 'Elements of Jaina Art'. He became the deputy director of Oriental Institute, Baroda in 1954. He became the head of Ramayana Project at the institute in 1965.

Shah died in November 1988.

== Works ==
Umakant P Shah is credited with 62 works in 147 publications in 2 languages and 951 library holdings.

His works on Jainism includes "Jaina-rūpa-maṇḍana: Jaina iconography".
