= Mahavira =

Indian spiritual leader and the 24th Tirthankara of Jainism

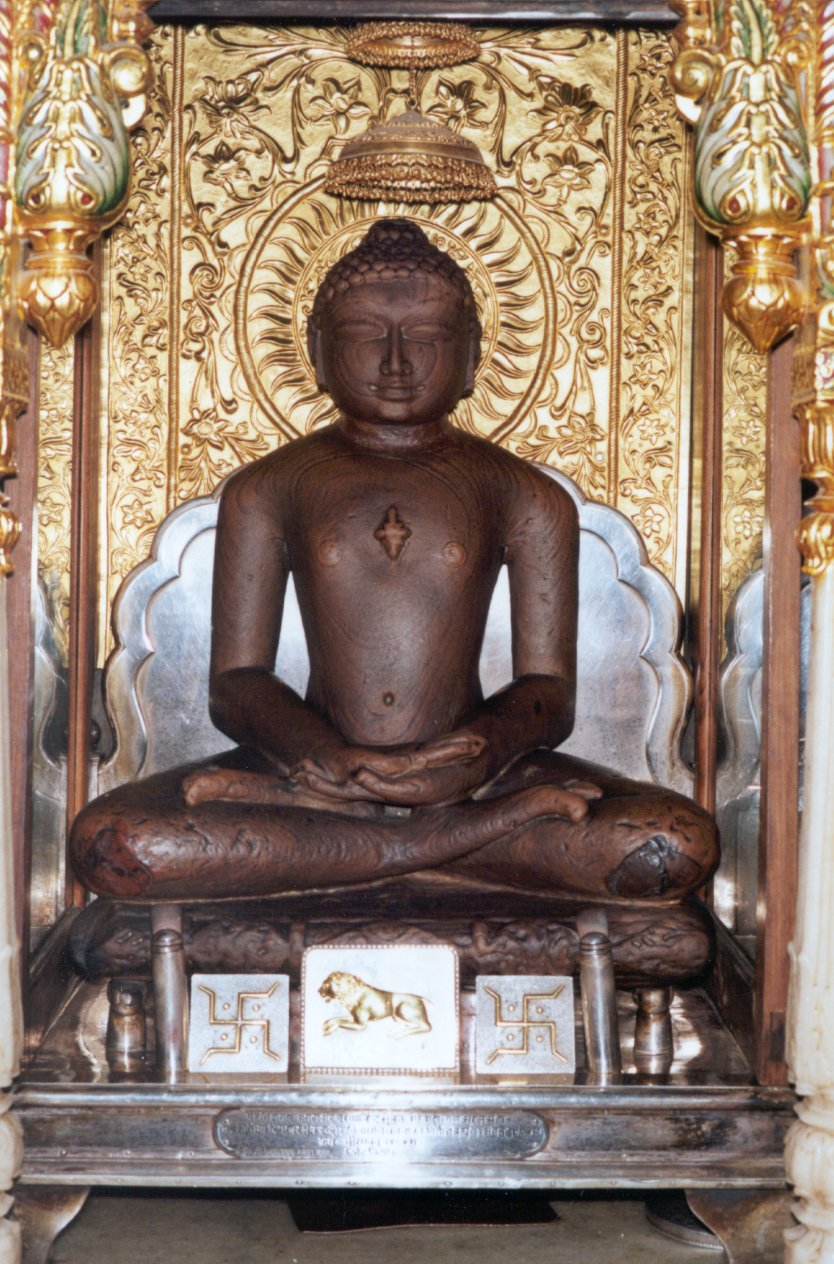
- Idol of Mahavira, the 24th Tirthankara, at Shri Mahavirji temple

Personal life
- Born: Vardhamāna c. 599 BCE (traditional) uncertain, possibly c. 6th or early 5th century BCE (historical) (Note: A number of historians, who now favor the "Short Chronology" for Gautama Buddha's lifetime (ca. 480-400 BCE), argue that the traditional dates for Mahavira also are too early, by as much as one century, since Mahavira and Buddha were contemporaries (Dundas 2002, p. 24, Kuiper 2010, p. 144, Shah 1999).) Kshatriyakund Kundagrāma; Nāya Republic, Vajjika League (near present-day Vaishali, Bihar, India)
- Died: 527 BCE (Śvetāmbara trad. dating), 510 BCE (Digambara trad. dating) (Note: *: "The two sects posit different dates for the death of Mahavira (527 BCE for Shvetambara, 510 BCE for Digambaras)." : ""According to Shvetambara calculation Mahavira was born in 599 BCE and died 527 BCE at the age of 72 years. This calculation is based on a statement at the end of the Jina legend in the Kalpa Sūtra, claiming that 980 or 993 had passed since the death of Mahavira. Contrary to Shvetambara tradition, the Digambaras date the salvation of Mahavira to 510 BCE.") uncertain, possibly c. late 5th century BCE (historical); Pawapuri, Magadha, Haryanka Empire (present-day Nalanda district, Bihar, India)
- Spouse: Yaśodā (Śvetāmbara); Unmarried (Digambara)
- Children: Priyadarsana
- Parents: Siddhārtha (father); Triśalā (mother)
- Dynasty: Nāya/Nātha
- Other names: Vira, Ativira, Sanmatinatha
- Relatives: Chetaka (uncle)

Religious life
- Religion: Jainism (as Vardhamāna)

Senior posting
- Predecessor: Pārśvanātha
- Successor: Mahāpadma / Padmanābha (first Tirthankara of the ascending next half or Utsarpiṇī of time-cycle)
- Disciples: Gautama Swami Sudharma Swami Agnibhūti Gautama Vāyubhūti Gautama Ārya Vyakta Svāmi Mandita Svāmi Mauryaputta Svāmi Akampita Svāmi Acalbhrātā Svāmi Metarya Svāmi Prabhāsa Svāmi
- Dynasty: Nāya/Nātha

Mahavira (Mahāvīra), also known by his birth name Vardhamana (Vardhamāna), was an Indian religious reformer and spiritual leader, considered by Jains to be the 24th and final Tirthankara (Supreme Preacher) in the current time cycle of Jain cosmology. He is believed by historians to have lived in the 6th or 5th century BCE, reviving and reforming an earlier Jain or proto-Jain community (Note: The traditional Jaina perspective regards Jainism as eternal dharma without a founder, whereas history of religion scholars seek to consider Jainism in historical context as a Śramaṇa movement emerging and gradually evolving during the late Vedic Period and during the Second Urbanisation of the Mahajanapada period (Dundas 2002, pp. 12–13, Long 2009, p. 30). Although some non-Jains have referred to Mahavira as the "founder" of Jainism (Doniger 1999, p. 549), most historians believe that his role likely was part of a much older religious current. Some historians have spoken of Jainism as continuously existing since prior to Mahavira's reforms, (von Glasenapp 1999, p. 24; Zimmer 1953, pp. 182–183: "[T]here must be some truth in the Jaina tradition of the great antiquity of their religion. At least with respect to Pārśva [...] we have grounds for believing that actually lived and taught, and was a Jaina.") while some use the term "proto-Jain" for the earlier period: Basham (1951, pp. 108–109): "Jainism [...] was but a development of the older proto-Jainism of Pārśva", with "a looser group of ascetics", "clothed proto-Jainas".; Long (2020, p. 206): "Jainism [...] is traced, in its current form, to Mahāvīra [...], although [...] there is some evidence that Mahāvīra's teaching is a continuation of an earlier, proto-Jain tradition."; Moore (1977, p. 137): "[Mahavira's] predecessor Parshvanatha may have been an historical proto-Jain leader about 200 years earlier."; Dundas (2002, p. 32): "It is impossible to be certain about the relationship between Mahāvīra and Pārśva and in actuality the chronological distance between the two teachers. [...] [E]arly Jainism coalesced out of an interaction between the cosmological ideas of Pārśva and a more rigorous form of orthopraxy advocated by Mahāvīra.") which had likely been led by Pārśvanātha, whom Jains consider to be Mahavira's predecessor. Although the dates of Mahavira's life are uncertain and historically reliable information is scarce, (Note: Uncertain historical details: Dundas (2002, pp. 22, 24–25): "It is fruitless to attempt to locate a historical Mahāvīra outside the parameters of the texts which describe him. Even such a basic question as when he lived is not certain. [...] Equally problematic is the question of Mahāvīra's birthplace [...] [His biography] expanded and evolved over a long period of time."; Long (2009, pp. 31–32): "Our knowledge of the life of Mahāvīra is dependent upon texts written down many years after the events they describe". Although it "can be said with confidence" that Mahāvīra existed, "this still leaves us with relatively little to go on in terms of information that would pass the muster of contemporary historical methods. [...] whatever historical truth may be in these scriptures, they are not 'historical' texts in the modern sense, Nor is this their apparent intent, spiritual instruction being their aim") and traditional accounts vary by sectarian traditions, the historicity of Mahavira is well-established and not in dispute among scholars.

According to traditional legends and hagiographies, Mahavira was born in 599 BCE to a ruling royal kshatriya Jain family of the Nāya tribe in what is now Bihar in India. According to traditional sources like the Ācārāṅga Sūtra, the Nāyas were followers of Parshvanatha, Mahavira's predecessor. Mahavira abandoned all worldly possessions at the age of about 30 and left home in pursuit of spiritual awakening, becoming an ascetic. Mahavira practiced intense meditation and severe austerities for twelve and a half years, after which he attained Kevala Jnana (omniscience). He preached for 30 years and attained moksha (liberation) when he died.

Mahavira taught attainment of samyaka darshana or self realization (atma-anubhuti) through the practice of bhedvijnāna. This practice involves positioning oneself as a pure soul, separate from the body, mind, and emotions; being aware of the soul's true nature; and remaining grounded and steadfast in soul's unchanging essence during varying auspicious or inauspicious external circumstances. He also preached that the observance of the vows of ahimsa (non-violence), satya (truth), asteya (non-stealing), brahmacharya (chastity), and aparigraha (non-attachment) is necessary for spiritual liberation. He taught the principles of Anekantavada (many-sided reality): syadvada and nayavada. Mahavira's teachings were compiled by Indrabhuti Gautama (his chief disciple) as the Jain Agamas. The texts, transmitted orally by Jain monks, are believed to have been largely lost by about the 1st century CE.

Mahavira is usually depicted in a sitting or standing meditative posture, with the symbol of a lion beneath him. His earliest iconography is from archaeological sites in the North Indian city of Mathura, and is dated from between the 1st century BCE and the 2nd century CE. His birth is celebrated as Mahavira Janma Kalyanaka while his nirvana (liberation) and attainment of Kevala jnana (omniscience) by Gautama Swami are observed by Jains as Diwali.

== Historical Mahavira ==
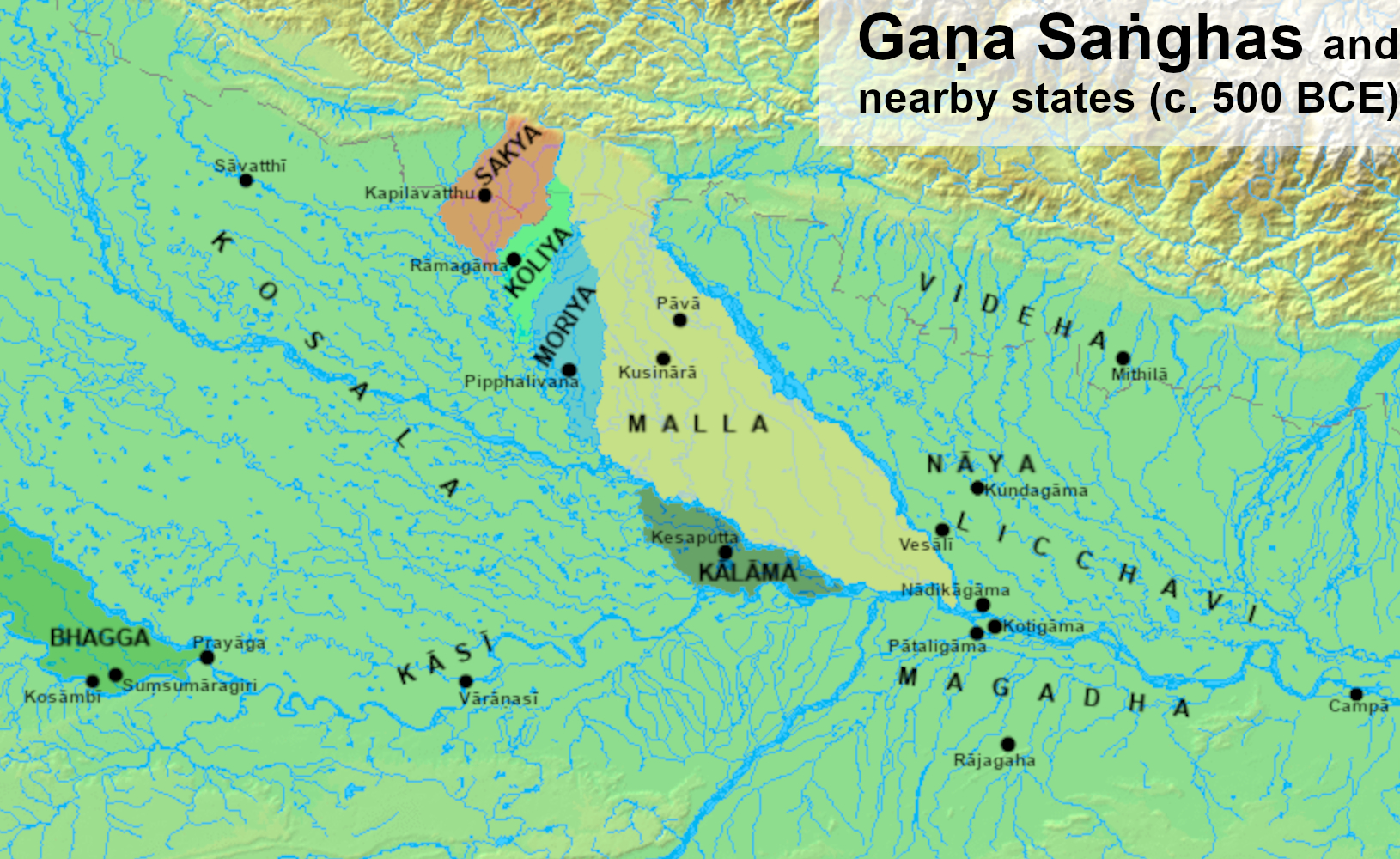
The Gaṇasaṅghas (tribal republics) at the time of Mahavira

Although it is universally accepted by scholars of Jainism that Mahavira lived in ancient India, the year of his birth and some additional information about his life are "uncertain and debatable."

=== Dating ===
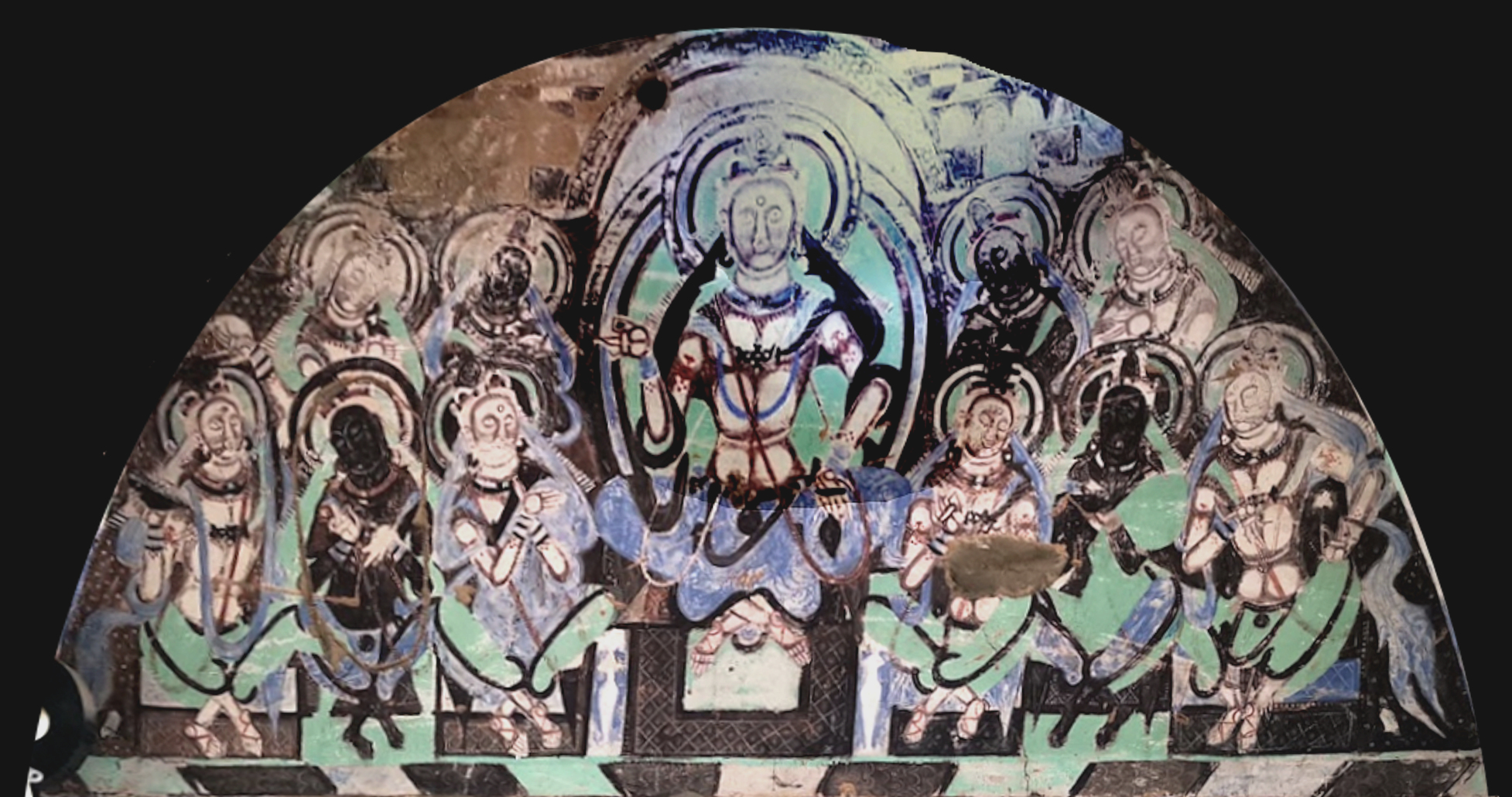
Painting of Mahavira among the Six Heretical Teachers in Kizil Caves, Xinjiang, China, 4th century CE

==== Traditional Jain-accounts ====
The Digambara and Śvetāmbara sects give different accounts of Mahavira's life. They agree that Mahavira was born in 599 BCE, but according to the Śvetāmbaras he died in 527 BCE, while the Digambaras believe that he died in 510 BCE.

Rapson notes that "The Jains themselves have preserved chronological records concerning Mahavira and the succeeding pontiffs of the Jain church, which may have been begun at a comparatively early date. But it seems quite clear that, at the time when these lists were put into their present form, the real date of Mahavira had already either been forgotten or was at least doubtful."

The Jain-tradition accepts the Vira Nirvana Samvat chronology, which starts in 527 BCE. The Vira Nirvana Samvat is based on the Vikram Samvat, which dates from the medieval period, (Note: The association of the era beginning in 57 BCE with Vikramaditya is not found in any source before the 9th century CE; earlier sources call the era "Kṛṭa" (343 and 371 CE), "Kritaa" (404), "the era of the Malava tribe" (424), or simply "Samvat" (Agrawal 1989, pp. 174–175, Srinivasachariar 1974, pp. 94–111). The earliest known inscription which calls the era "Vikrama" is from 842. This inscription, from the Chauhana ruler Chandamahasena, was found at Dholpur and is dated "Vikrama Samvat 898, Vaishakha Shukla 2, Chanda" (20 April 842). The earliest known inscription which associates the era with a king called Vikramaditya is dated 971, and the earliest literary work connecting the era to Vikramaditya is Subhashita-Ratna-Sandoha (993–994) by the Jain author Amitagati (Srinivasachariar 1974, pp. 94–111).) and starts in 57 or 58 BCE, to which 470 years are added, giving 527 or 528 BCE. According to Rapson, this calculation is based on "a list of kings and dynasties who are supposed to have reigned between 528 and 58 BC[E]," and is not reliable, "as it confuses rulers of Ujjain, Magadha, and other kingdoms; and some of these may perhaps have been contemporary, and not successive as they are represented." (Note: In 1912, historian G.H Ojha discovered an Barli Inscription in Prakrit language. According to him, the inscription contains the line "Viraya Bhagavate chaturasiti vase", interpreted by him as "year 84 of the Vira Nirvana Samvat." Following the Vira Nirvana Samvat, Ojha dated the inscription to 443 BCE (Bharatkalyan, Kailash Chand Jain 1972, p. 152, Goyal 2005, p. 105, Bhandarkar Oriental Research Institute 1978). However, the line could also be a reference to the 84 Mahasiddhas (Bharatkalyan), and palaeographic analysis dates the inscription to the 2nd-1st century BCE. Swarajya Prakash Gupta & K. S. Ramachandran (1979, p. 106): "The Barli inscription, which was placed by Ojha in fifth century B.C., can really be assigned to the first century B.C., on paleographic grounds." See also (Goyala 2006), and (Bhandarkar Oriental Research Institute 1978: "On palaeographic grounds [the Barli inscription] has to be placed after the Besnagar inscription of Heliodorus and is possibly later than the Ghosundi inscription"). D. C. Sircar and S. R. Goyal question the link with the Vira Nirvana Samvat, noting that the desigantion of this era under this name first appeared in the early medieval period, and most probably did not exist in the century following the death of Mahavira (Goyal 2005, p. 22). Goyal (2005, p. 3): "The belief that the Barli inscription is dated in the 84th year of the Mahavlra Era and thus belongs to the fifth century B.C. is rightly regarded as baseless, for no such era was in existence in that period.")

The 12th-century Jain scholar Hemachandra placed Mahavira in the 6th–5th century BCE.

==== Scholarly datings ====
There has been considerable scholarly debate on Mahavira's dates since the 19th century, and various dates have been proposed. While traditional accounts adhere to the timeline that places his birth in 599 BCE and his nirvana in 527 BCE or 510 BCE, "[s]ome scholars believe this date to be as much as 100 years early."

On the basis of chronologies in Hemachandra's Pariśiṣṭaparvan, some historians have dated Mahavira's birth to 549 BCE, and his death to 477 or ca. 468–467 BCE.

Ultimately, Mahavira's dates depend on the dates for the Buddha, who was a (slightly later) contemporary of Mahavira, (Note: The Buddha was younger than Mahavira and "might have attained nirvana a few years later.") which is supported by Buddhist texts. They both lived during the reigns of the kings Bimbisara and Ajatashatru of Magadha. (Note: Both Mahavira and the Buddha were proponents of the Śramaṇa movements, which became popular in Greater Magadha at the end of the Vedic Period and during the Second Urbanisation of the Mahajanapada period, greatly impacting the course of Indian religious history.) Historians who accept the "Short Chronology" for Gautama Buddha's lifetime (ca. 480–400 BCE), argue that the traditional dates for Mahavira are also too early, by as much as one century, since Mahavira and Buddha were contemporaries. Dundas suggests that Mahavira may have died "around 425 BCE, or a few years after", and Long suggests "c.499–427 BCE" as his approximate lifespan.

=== Role in Jainism ===
==== Jain-accounts: successor ====
Jains believe that the 23 previous tirthankaras also espoused Jainism. Mahavira is placed in Parshvanatha's lineage as his spiritual successor and ultimate leader of shraman sangha. According to Dundas, Jains believe that the lineage of Parshvanatha influenced Mahavira. Parshvanatha, as the one who "removes obstacles and has the capacity to save", is a popular icon; his image is the focus of Jain temple devotion. Of the 24 tirthankaras, Jain iconography has celebrated Mahavira and Parshvanatha the most; sculptures discovered at the Mathura archaeological site have been dated to the 1st century BCE.

According to Jain tradition, Parshvanatha was a tirthankara born 273 years before Mahavira, which would mean he lived in about the 9th or 8th century BCE. However, "some scholars have suggested that Pārśvanātha and Mahāvīra were actually closer in time than the tradition claims", and that "Pārśva could not have started his ascetic career before the beginning of the sixth century BC[E]" and "may have passed away only a few decades before Vardhamāna [i.e., Mahāvīra] had started his preaching career".

==== Scholarly accounts: reformer ====
Mahavira is believed by historians to have revived and reformed an earlier Jain or proto-Jain community which had likely been led by Pārśvanātha, whom Jains consider to be Mahavira's predecessor. According to Moriz Winternitz, Mahavira may be considered a reformer of an existing Jain sect known as Niganthas (fetter-less) which was mentioned in early Buddhist texts.

=== Birthplace ===
According to both sectarian text Uttarapurana and Kalpa Sūtra, Mahavira was born in Kundagrama in the Kingdom of the Videhas. Kundagrama is said to be located in present-day Bihar, India, although the exact location of Kundagrama within Bihar remains a subject of dispute.

Kundagrama was identified by J. P. Sharma as a suburb of the city of Vaishali, and because of this, some sources refer to him as Vesālie.

Another potential location of Kundagrāma is the village of Basu Kund, about 60 kilometres (37 miles) north of Patna (the capital of Bihar).

=== Life-course ===
Mahavira renounced his material wealth and left home when he was twenty-eight, according to some accounts, and thirty according to others. He lived an ascetic life for twelve and a half years in which he did not even sit for a time, attained Kevalgyana and then preached Dharma for thirty years. The location where he preached has been a subject of disagreement between the two major traditions of Jainism: Śvētāmbara and Digambara. The place of his nirvana, Pavapuri in present-day Bihar, is a pilgrimage site for Jains.

== Life according to Jain tradition ==
=== Sources ===
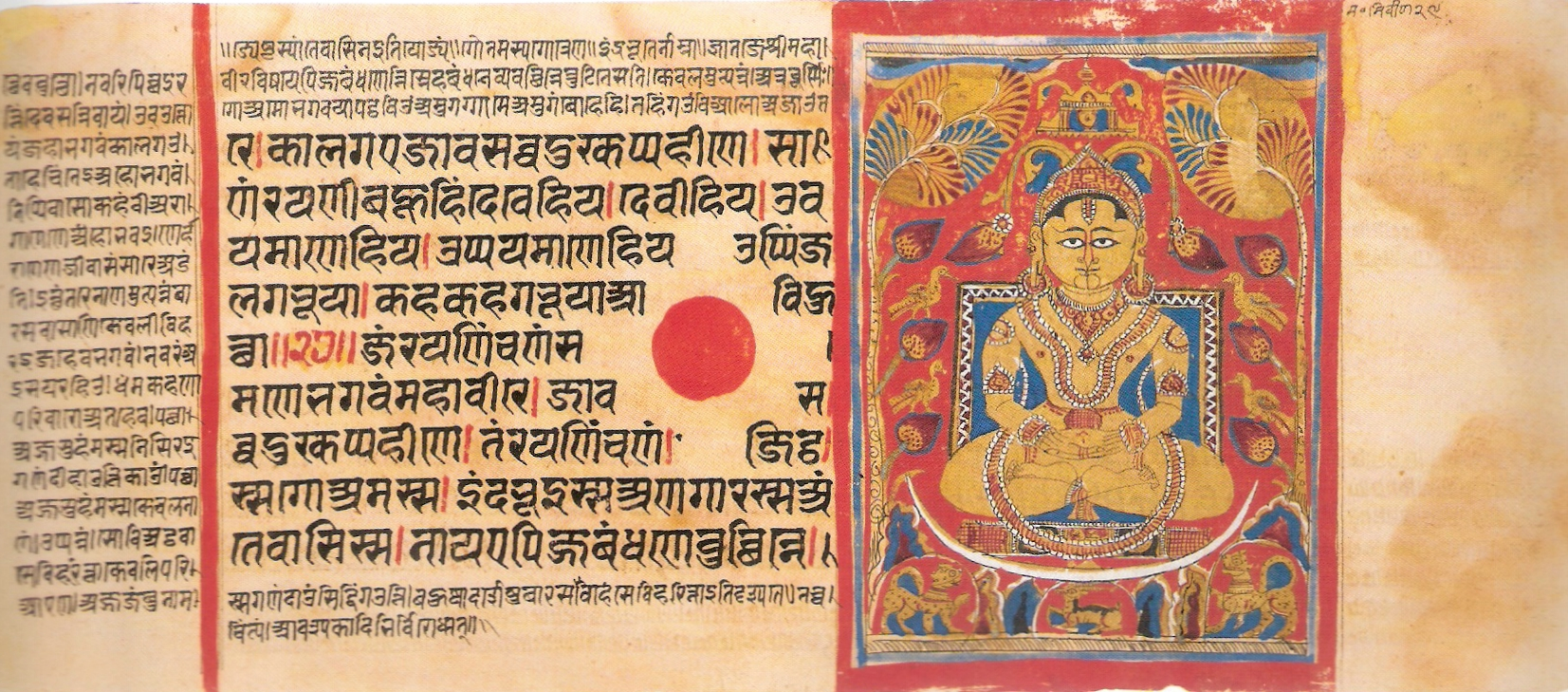
Folio from the Kalpa Sūtra, 15th century

Yativṛṣabha's Tiloya-paṇṇatti recounts nearly all the events of Mahavira's life in a form convenient for memorisation. Jinasena's Mahapurana (which includes the Ādi purāṇa and Uttara-purāṇa) was completed by his disciple, Gunabhadra, in the 8th century. In the Uttara-purāṇa, Mahavira's life is described in three parvans (sections 74–76) and 1,818 verses.

Vardhamacharitra is a Sanskrit kāvya poem written by Asaga in 853 CE that narrates the life of Mahavira. The Kalpa Sūtra is a collection of biographies of tirthankaras, notably Parshvanatha and Mahavira. The Samavayanga Sutra is a collection of Mahavira's teachings, and the Ācārāṅga Sūtra recounts his asceticism.

=== Tirthankaras ===
According to Jain cosmology, 24 Tirthankaras have appeared on earth; Mahavira is the last tirthankara of Avasarpiṇī (the present time cycle). (Note: Heinrich Zimmer: "The cycle of time continually revolves, according to the Jainas. The present "descending" (avasarpini) period was preceded and will be followed by an "ascending" (utsarpini). Sarpini suggests the creeping movement of a "serpent" (sarpin); ava- means "down" and ut- means up.") A tirthankara (ford-maker, saviour or spiritual teacher) signifies the founding of a tirtha, a passage across the sea of birth-and-death cycles.

=== Previous births ===
Mahavira's previous births are recounted in Jain texts such as the Mahapurana and Tri-shashti-shalaka-purusha-charitra. Although a soul undergoes countless reincarnations in the transmigratory cycle of saṃsāra, the birth of a tirthankara is reckoned from the time he determines the causes of karma and pursues ratnatraya. Jain texts describe Mahavira's 26 births before his incarnation as a tirthankara. According to the texts, he was born as Marichi (the son of Bharata Chakravartin) in a previous life.

=== Birth ===
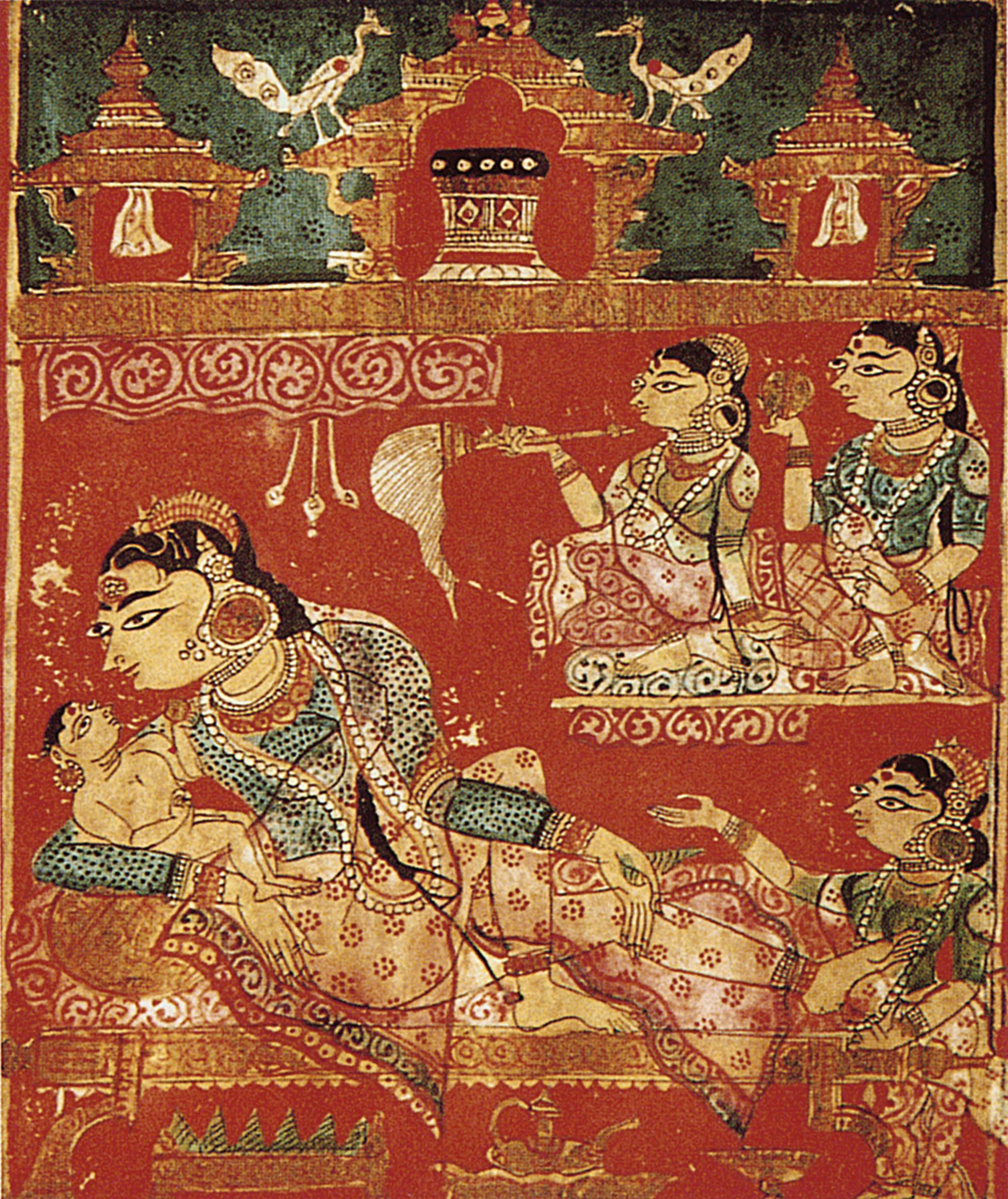
The birth of Mahavira, from the Kalpa Sūtra (c. 1375–1400 CE)

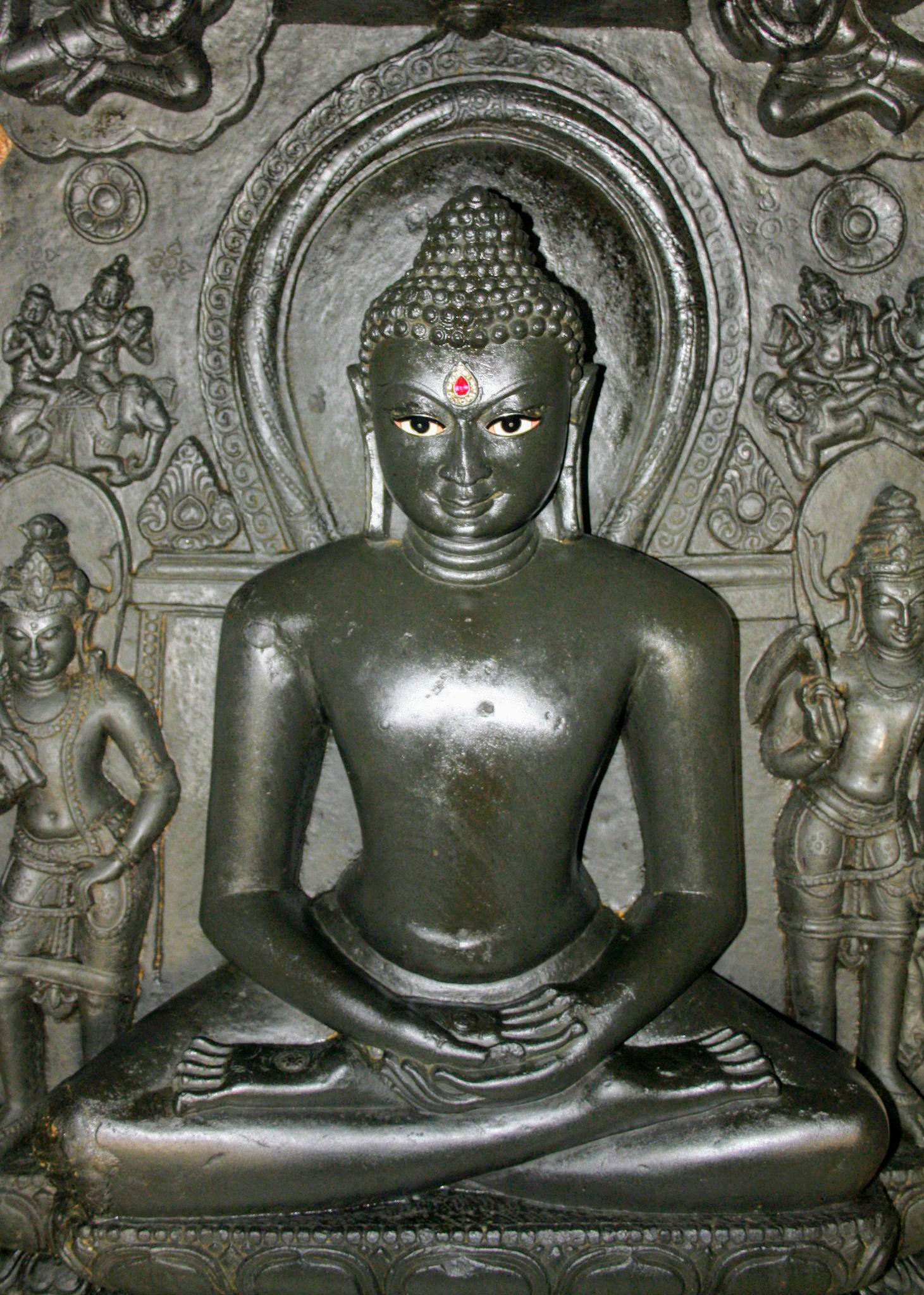
Mahavira, Kshatriyakund (birthplace in Śvetāmbara tradition)

Tirthankara Mahavira was born in Kundagrāma into the royal Jain family of King Siddhartha of the Nāya tribe and Queen Trishala of the Licchavi republic. (Note: Trishala was the sister of King Chetaka of Vaishali in ancient India.) The Nāyas were kshatriyas and saw themselves as being related to the Videhas. The Ācārāṅga Sūtra informs us that:

Mahavira was a Naya, the son of a Naya-Khattiya: the moon of the clan of the Nayas: a Videha, the son of Videhadatta, native of Videha (Videha-jacce); a prince of Videha (Videha-kūmāle), who had lived 30 years in Videha when his parents passed away.

According to Jains, Mahavira was born in 599 BCE. His birth date falls on the thirteenth day of the rising moon in the month of Chaitra in the Vira Nirvana Samvat calendar era. It falls in March or April of the Gregorian calendar, and is celebrated by Jains as Mahavir Janma Kalyanak.

Kshatriyakund (the place of Mahavira's birth) is traditionally believed to be near Vaishali, an ancient town on the Indo-Gangetic Plain. Its location in present-day Bihar is unclear, partly because of migrations from ancient Bihar for economic and political reasons. According to the "Universal History" in Jain texts, Mahavira underwent many rebirths (total 27 births) before his birth in the 6th-century BCE. They included a denizen of hell, a lion, and a god (deva) in a heavenly realm just before his last birth as the 24th tirthankara. Svetambara texts state that his embryo first formed in a Bamana woman before it was transferred by Hari-Naigamesin (the divine commander of Indra's army) to the womb of Trishala, Siddhartha's wife. (Note: This mythology has similarities with those found in the mythical texts of the Vaishnavism tradition of Hinduism.) The embryo-transfer legend is not believed by adherents of the Digambara tradition.

Jain texts state that after Mahavira was born, the god Indra came from the heavens along with 56 digkumaries, anointed him, and performed his abhisheka (consecration) on Mount Meru. These events, illustrated in a number of Jain temples, play a part in modern Jain temple rituals. Although the Kalpa Sūtra accounts of Mahavira's birth legends are recited by Svetambara Jains during the annual Paryushana festival, the same festival is observed by the Digambaras without the recitation.

=== Early life ===
Mahavira grew up as a prince. According to the second chapter of the Śvētāmbara text Ācārāṅga Sūtra, his parents were lay devotees of Parshvanatha. There is also an internal Jain belief that Mahavira met and studied with Parshva, although scholars remain uncertain about this. Jain traditions differ about whether Mahavira married. The Digambara tradition believes that his parents wanted him to marry Yashoda, but he refused to marry. (Note: On this Champat Rai Jain wrote: ""Of the two versions of Mahavira's life — the Swetambara and the Digambara— it is obvious that only one can be true: either Mahavira married, or he did not marry. If Mahavira married, why should the Digambaras deny it? There is absolutely no reason for such a denial. The Digambaras acknowledge that nineteen out of the twenty-four tirthamkaras married and had children. If Mahavira also married it would make no difference. There is thus no reason whatsoever for the Digambaras to deny a simple incident like this. But there may be a reason for the Swetambaras making the assertion; the desire to ante-date their own origin. As a matter of fact their own books contain clear refutation of the statement that Mahavira had married. In the Samavayanga Sutra (Hyderabad edition) it is definitely stated that nineteen tirthankaras lived as householders, that is, all the twenty-four excepting Shri Mahavira, Parashva, Nemi, Mallinath and Vaspujya.") The Śvētāmbara tradition believes that he was married to Yashoda at a young age and had one daughter, Priyadarshana, also called Anojja.

Jain texts portray Mahavira as tall; his height was given as 7 hastas or four cubits (6 feet) in the Aupapatika Sutra. According to Jain texts, he was the shortest of the twenty-four tirthankaras; earlier arihants were believed to have been taller, with Neminatha or Aristanemi —the 22nd tirthankara, who lived for 1,000 years—said to have been sixty-five cubits (98 feet) in height.

=== Renunciation ===
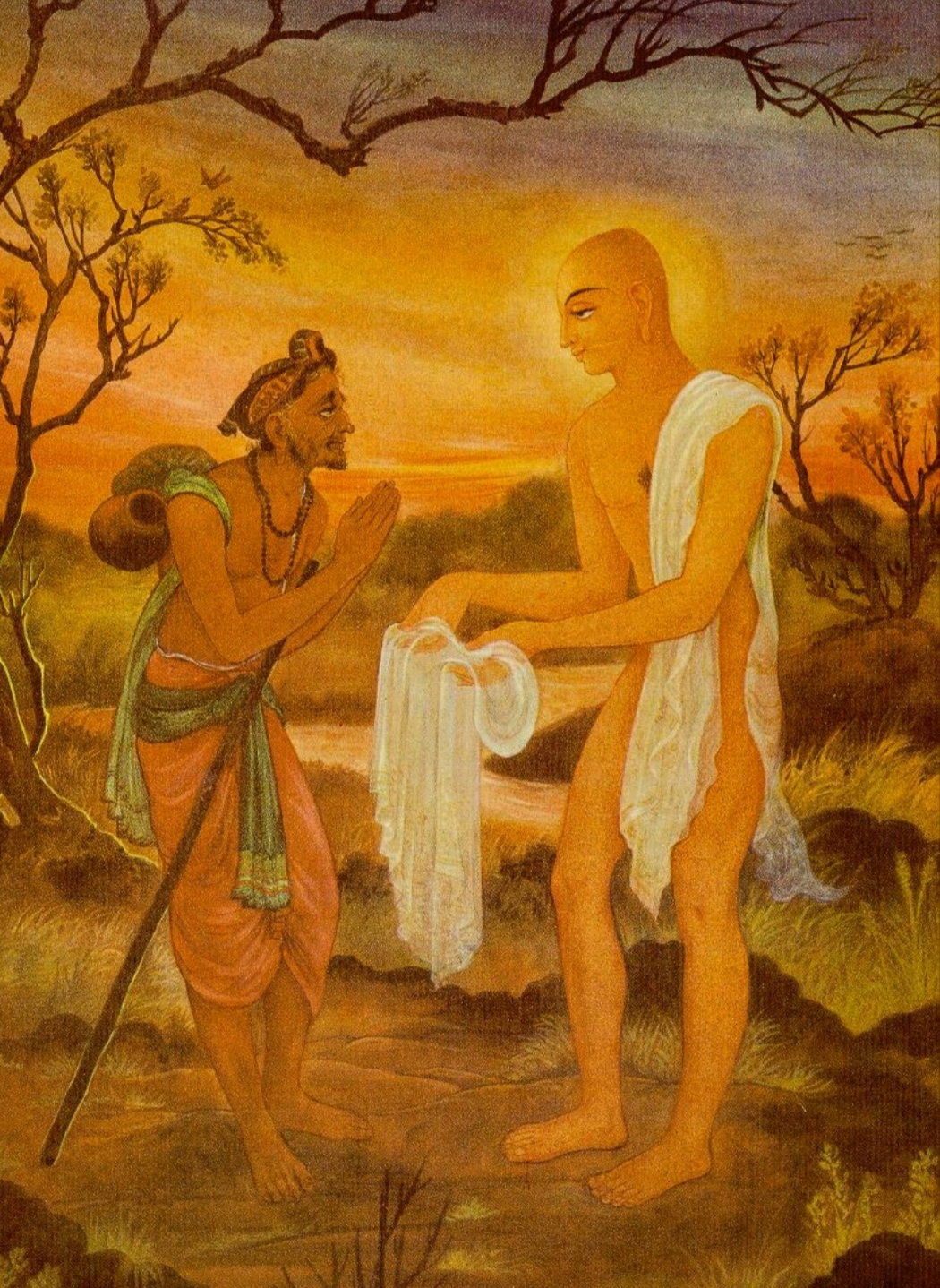
Tirthankar Mahavir giving his half garment to a brahmin as alms

At age thirty, Mahavira abandoned royal life and left his home and family to live an ascetic life in the pursuit of spiritual awakening. He undertook severe fasts and bodily mortifications, meditated under the Ashoka tree, and discarded his clothes. The Ācārāṅga Sūtra has a graphic description of his hardships and self-mortification. According to the Kalpa Sūtra, Mahavira spent the first forty-two monsoons of his life in Astikagrama, Champapuri, Prstichampa, Vaishali, Vanijagrama, Nalanda, Mithila, Bhadrika, Alabhika, Panitabhumi, Shravasti, and Pawapuri. He is said to have lived in Rajagriha during the rainy season of the forty-first year of his ascetic life, which is traditionally dated to 491 BCE.

=== Omniscience ===
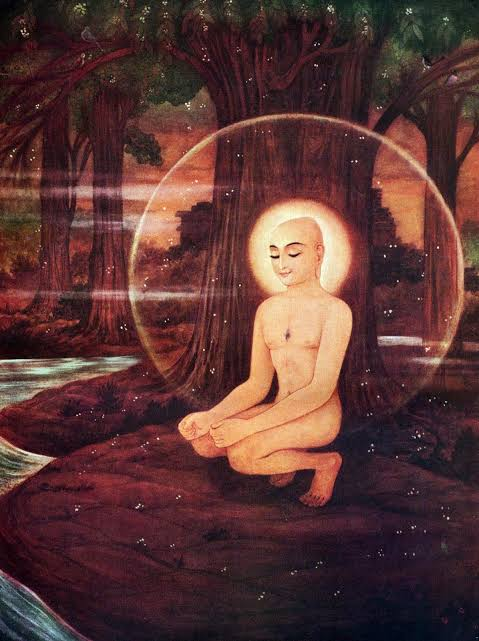
Lord Mahavir attaining omniscience in shukla dhyana, the highest and purest level of meditation

According to traditional accounts, Mahavira achieved Kevala Jnana (omniscience, or infinite knowledge) under a Sāla tree on the bank of the River Rijuvalika near Jrimbhikagrama at age 43 after twelve years of rigorous penance. The details of the event are described in the Jain Uttar-purāņa and Harivamśa-purāņa texts. The Ācārāṅga Sūtra describes Mahavira as all-seeing. The Sutrakritanga expands it to all-knowing, and describes his other qualities. Jains believe that Mahavira had a most auspicious body (paramaudārika śarīra) and was free from eighteen imperfections when he attained omniscience. According to the Śvētāmbara, he traveled throughout India to teach his philosophy for thirty years after attaining omniscience. However, the Digambara believe that he remained in his Samavasarana and delivered sermons to his followers.

=== Disciples ===
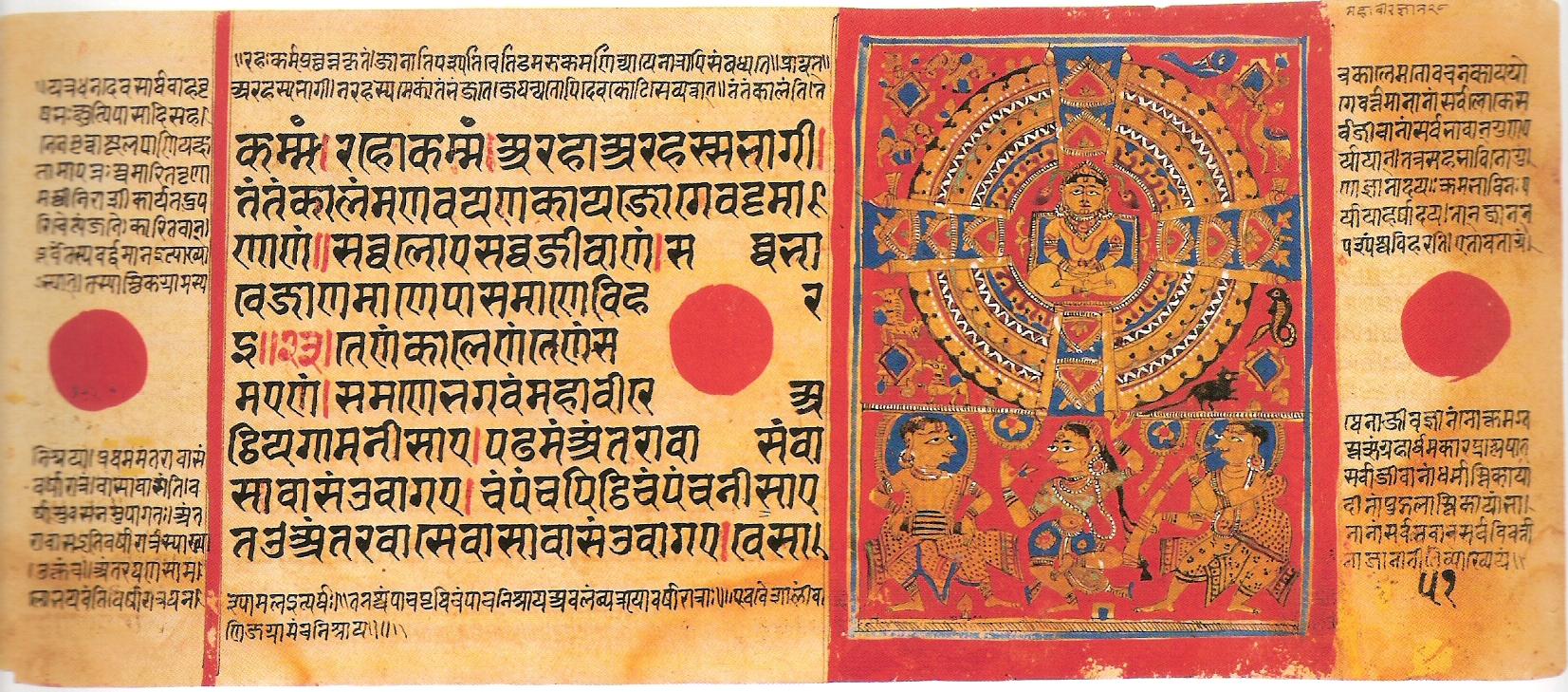
[Top illustration] Mahavira attains kevala jñāna (complete knowledge); [Bottom] a samosarana (divine preaching hall). Folio 60 from Kalpasutra series, loose leaf manuscript, Patan, Gujarat. c. 1472.

Jain texts document eleven Brahmanas as Mahavira's first disciples, traditionally known as the eleven Ganadharas. Indrabhuti Gautama is believed to have been their leader, the others were named: Agnibhuti, Vayubhuti, Akampita, Arya Vyakta, Sudharman, Manditaputra, Mauryaputra, Acalabhraataa, Metraya, and Prabhasa. The Ganadharas are believed to have remembered and to have verbally transmitted Mahavira's teachings after his death. His teachings became known as Gani-Pidaga, or the Jain Agamas. According to Kalpa Sutra, Mahavira had 14,000 sadhus (male ascetic devotees), 36,000 sadhvis (female ascetics), 159,000 sravakas (male lay followers), and 318,000 sravikas (female lay followers). Jain tradition mentions Srenika and Kunika of Haryanka dynasty (popularly known as Bimbisara and Ajatashatru) and Chetaka of Videha as his royal followers. Mahavira initiated his mendicants with the mahavratas (Five Vows). He delivered fifty-five pravachana (recitations) and a set of lectures (Uttaraadhyayana-sutra). Chandana is believed to be the leader of female monastic order.

=== Nirvana and moksha ===
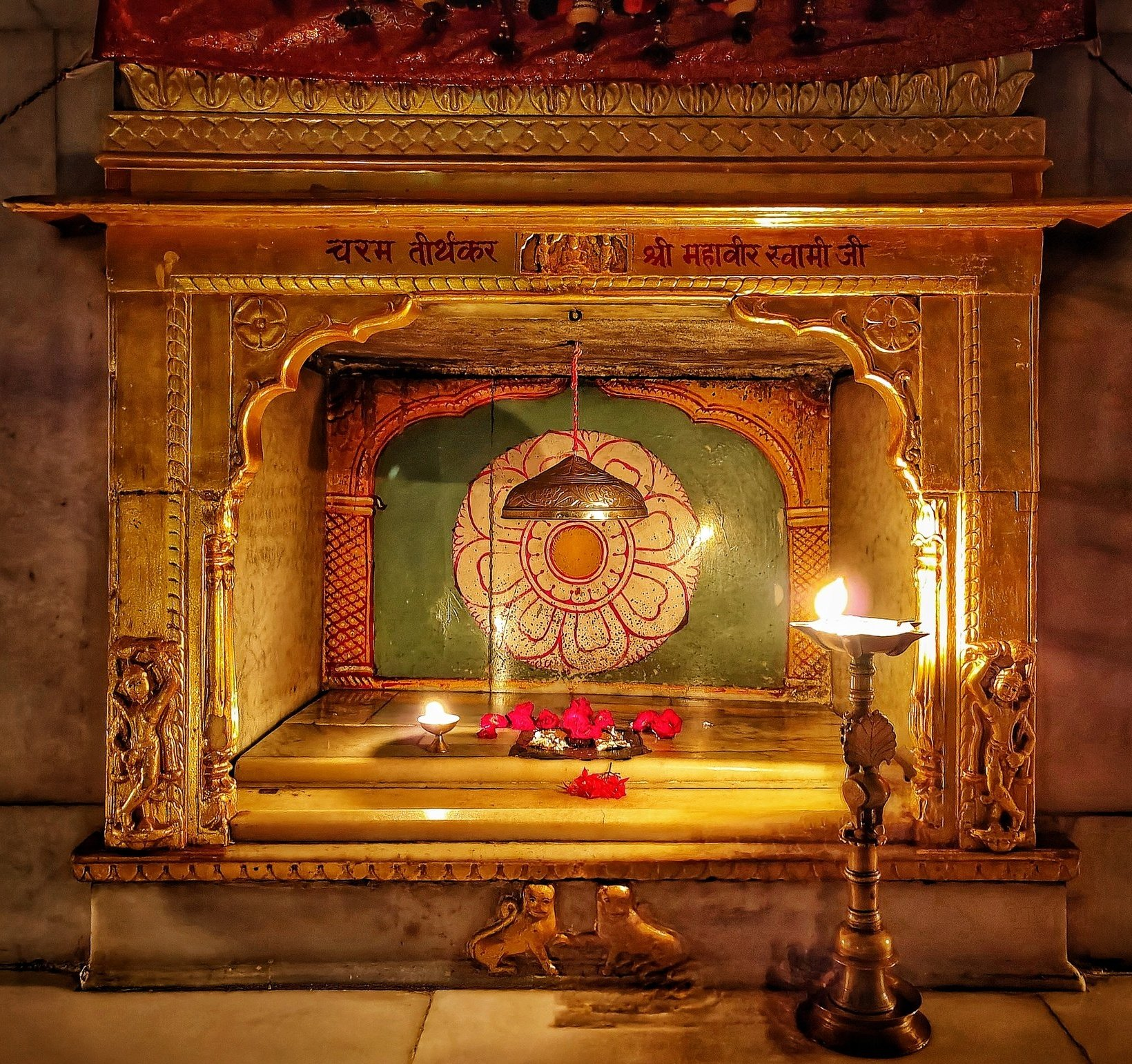
The "Charan Paduka" or foot impression of Mahavira at Jal Mandir

According to Jain texts, Mahavira's nirvana (death) (Note: Not to be confused with kevalajnana (omniscience).) occurred in the town of Pawapuri in present-day Bihar. His life as a spiritual light and the night of his nirvana are commemorated by Jains as Diwali at the same time that Hindus celebrate it. His chief disciple, Gautama, is said to have attained omniscience the night that Mahavira achieved nirvana from Pawapuri.

Accounts of Mahavira's nirvana vary among Jain texts, with some describing a simple nirvana and others recounting grandiose celebrations attended by gods and kings. According to the Jinasena's Mahapurana, heavenly beings arrived to perform his funeral rites. The Pravachanasara of Digambara tradition says that only the nails and hair of tirthankaras are left behind; the rest of the body dissolves in the air like camphor. In some texts Mahavira is described, at age 72, as delivering his final preaching over a six-day period to a large group of people. The crowd falls asleep, awakening to find that he has disappeared (leaving only his nails and hair, which his followers cremate).

The Jain Śvētāmbara tradition believes that Mahavira's nirvana occurred in 527 BCE, and the Digambara tradition holds that date of 510 BCE. In both traditions, his jiva (soul) is believed to abide in Siddhashila (the home of liberated souls). Mahavira's Jal Mandir stands at the place where he is said to have attained nirvana (moksha). Artworks in Jain temples and texts depict his final liberation and cremation, sometimes shown symbolically as a small pyre of sandalwood and a piece of burning camphor.

== Teachings ==
Colonial-era Indologists considered Jainism (and Mahavira's followers) a sect of Buddhism because of superficial similarities in iconography and meditative and ascetic practices. As scholarship progressed, differences between the teachings of Mahavira and the Buddha were found so divergent that the religions were acknowledged as separate. Mahavira, says Moriz Winternitz, taught a "very elaborate belief in the soul" (unlike the Buddhists, who denied such elaboration). His ascetic teachings have a higher order of magnitude than those of Buddhism or Hinduism, and his emphasis on ahimsa (non-violence) is greater than that in other Indian religions.

=== Agamas ===
Mahavira's teachings were compiled by Gautama Swami, his Ganadhara (chief disciple). The canonical scriptures are in twelve parts. Mahavira's teachings were gradually lost after about 300 BCE, according to Jain tradition, when a severe famine in the Magadha kingdom dispersed the Jain monks. Attempts were made by later monks to gather, recite the canon, and re-establish it. These efforts identified differences in recitations of Mahavira's teachings, and an attempt was made in the 5th century CE to reconcile the differences. The reconciliation efforts failed, with Svetambara and Digambara Jain traditions holding their own incomplete, somewhat-different versions of Mahavira's teachings. In the early centuries of the common era, Jain texts containing Mahavira's teachings were written in palm-leaf manuscripts. According to the Digambaras, Āchārya Bhutabali was the last ascetic with partial knowledge of the original canon. Later, some learned achāryas restored, compiled, and wrote down the teachings of Mahavira which were the subjects of the Agamas. Āchārya Dharasena, in the 1st century CE, guided the Āchāryas Pushpadant and Bhutabali as they wrote down the teachings. The two Āchāryas wrote Ṣaṭkhaṅḍāgama, among the oldest-known Digambara texts, on palm leaves.

=== Five Vows ===
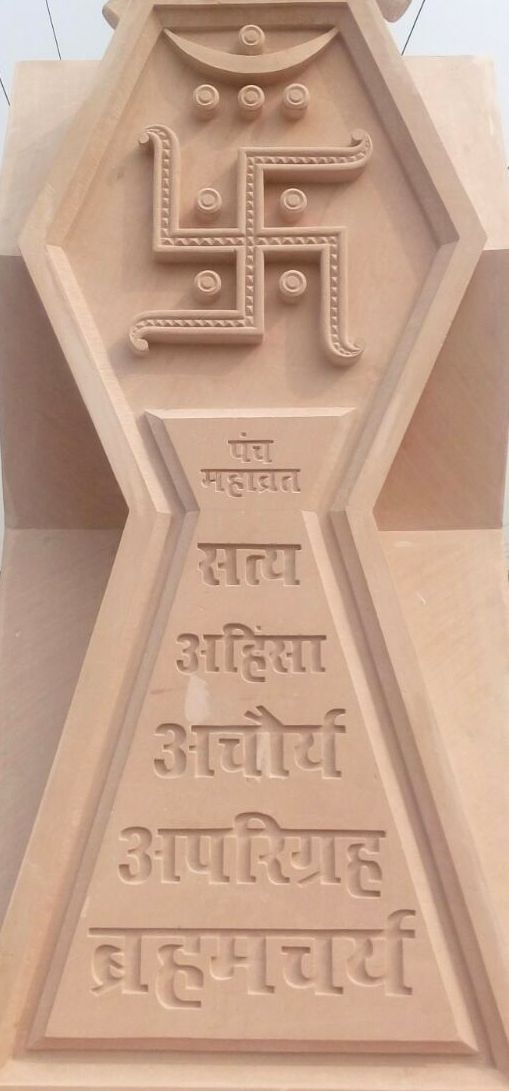
The swastika and five vows

The Jain Agamas enumerate five vratas (vows) which ascetics and householders must observe. These ethical principles were preached by Mahavira:

1. Ahimsa (Non-violence or non-injury): Mahavira taught that every living being has sanctity and dignity which should be respected as one expects one's own sanctity and dignity to be respected. Ahimsa, Jainism's first and most important vow, applies to actions, speech, and thought. When Mahavira revived the Jain community, ahimsa was already an established, strictly observed rule. The followers of Parshvanatha vowed to observe ahimsa; this obligation was part of their caujjama dhamma (Fourfold Restraint).
2. Satya (truthfulness): Applies to oneself and others.
3. Asteya (non-stealing): Not "taking anything that has not been given"
4. Brahmacharya (chastity): Abstinence from sex and sensual pleasures for monks, and faithfulness to one's partner for householders
5. Aparigraha (non-attachment): For lay people, an attitude of non-attachment to property or worldly possessions; for mendicants, not owning anything

The goal of these principles is to achieve spiritual peace, a better rebirth, or (ultimately) liberation. According to Chakravarthi, these teachings help improve a person's quality of life. However, Paul Dundas writes that Mahavira's emphasis on non-violence and restraint has been interpreted by some Jain scholars to "not be driven by merit from giving or compassion to other creatures, nor a duty to rescue all creatures" but by "continual self discipline": a cleansing of the soul which leads to spiritual development and release.

Mahavira is best remembered in the Indian traditions for his teaching that ahimsa is the supreme moral virtue. He taught that ahimsa covers all living beings, and injuring any being in any form creates bad karma (which affects one's rebirth, future well-being, and suffering). According to Mahatma Gandhi, Mahavira was the greatest authority on ahimsa.

=== Soul ===
Mahavira taught that the soul exists. There is no soul (or self) in Buddhism, and its teachings are based on the concept of anatta (non-self). Mahavira taught that the soul is dravya (substantial), eternal, and yet temporary.

To Mahavira, the metaphysical nature of the universe consists of dravya, jiva, and ajiva (inanimate objects). The jiva is bound to saṃsāra (transmigration) because of karma (the effects of one's actions). Karma, in Jainism, includes actions and intent; it colors the soul (lesya), affecting how, where, and as what a soul is reborn after death.

According to Mahavira, there is no creator deity and existence has neither beginning nor end. Deities and demons however exist in Jainism, whose jivas are a part of the same cycle of birth and death. The goal of spiritual practice is to liberate the jiva from its karmic accumulation and enter the realm of the siddhas, souls who are liberated from rebirth. Enlightenment, to Mahavira, is the consequence of self awareness, self-cultivation and restraint from materialism.

=== Anekantavada ===
Mahavira taught the doctrine of anekantavada (many-sided reality). Although the word does not appear in the earliest Jain literature or the Agamas, the doctrine is illustrated in Mahavira's answers to questions posed by his followers. Truth and reality are complex, and have a number of aspects. Reality can be experienced, but it is impossible to express it fully with language alone; human attempts to communicate are nayas ("partial expression[s] of the truth"). Language itself is not truth, but a means of expressing it. From truth, according to Mahavira, language returns—not the other way around. One can experience the "truth" of a taste, but cannot fully express that taste through language. Any attempt to express the experience is syāt: valid "in some respect", but still a "perhaps, just one perspective, incomplete". Spiritual truths are also complex, with multiple aspects, and language cannot express their plurality; however, they can be experienced through effort and appropriate karma.

The Jain Agamas suggest that Mahavira's approach to answering metaphysical, philosophical questions was a "qualified yes" (syāt). A version of this doctrine is also found in the Ajivika school of ancient Indian philosophy.

According to Dundas, the anekantavada doctrine has been interpreted by many Jains as "promot[ing] a universal religious tolerance ... plurality ... [and a] ... benign attitude to other [ethical, religious] positions"; however, this misreads Jain historical texts and Mahavira's teachings. Mahavira's "many pointedness, multiple perspective" teachings are a doctrine about the nature of reality and human existence, not about tolerating religious positions such as sacrificing animals (or killing them for food) or violence against nonbelievers (or any other living being) as "perhaps right". The five vows for Jain monks and nuns are strict requirements, with no "perhaps". Mahavira's Jainism co-existed with Buddhism and Hinduism beyond the renunciant Jain communities, but each religion was "highly critical of the knowledge systems and ideologies of their rivals".

=== Gender ===
A historically contentious view in Jainism is partially attributed to Mahavira and his ascetic life; he did not wear clothing, as a sign of renunciation (the fifth vow, aparigraha). It was disputed whether a female mendicant (sadhvi) could achieve the spiritual liberation like a male mendicant (sadhu) through asceticism.

The digambar sect (the sky-clad, naked mendicant order) believed that a woman is unable to fully practice asceticism and cannot achieve spiritual liberation because of her gender; she can, at best, live an ethical life so she is reborn as a man. (Note: According to Melton and Baumann, the Digambaras state that "women's physical and emotional character makes it impossible for them to genuinely engage in the intense [ascetic] path necessary for spiritual purification. (...) Only by being reborn as a man can a woman engage in the ascetic path. Later Digambara secondary arguments appealed to human physiology in order to exclude women from the path: by their very biological basis, women constantly generate and destroy (and therefore harm) life forms within their sexual organs. Svetambara oppose this view by appealing to scriptures.")

Mahavira had preached about men and women equality. The Svetambaras have interpreted Mahavira's teaching as encouraging both sexes to pursue a mendicant, ascetic life with the possibility of moksha (kaivalya, spiritual liberation).

=== Rebirth and realms of existence ===
Rebirth and realms of existence are fundamental teachings of Mahavira. According to the Acaranga Sutra, Mahavira believed that life existed in myriad forms which included animals, plants, insects, bodies of water, fire, and wind. He taught that a monk should avoid touching or disturbing any of them (including plants) and never swim, light (or extinguish) a fire, or wave their arms in the air; such actions might injure other beings living in those states of matter.

Mahavira preached that the nature of existence is cyclic, and the soul is reborn after death in one of the trilok – the heavenly, hellish, or earthly realms of existence and suffering. Humans are reborn, depending on one's karma (actions) as a human, animal, element, microbe, or other form, on earth or in a heavenly (or hellish) realm. Nothing is permanent; everyone (including gods, demons and earthly beings) dies and is reborn, based on their actions in their previous life. Jinas who have reached Kevala Jnana (omniscience) are not reborn; they enter the siddhaloka, the "realm of the perfected ones".

== Temples and pilgrimage ==
Along with Rishabhanatha, Parsvanatha, Neminatha, and Shantinatha; Mahavira is one of the five tirthankaras that attract the most devotional worship among the Jains.

=== Pawapuri ===
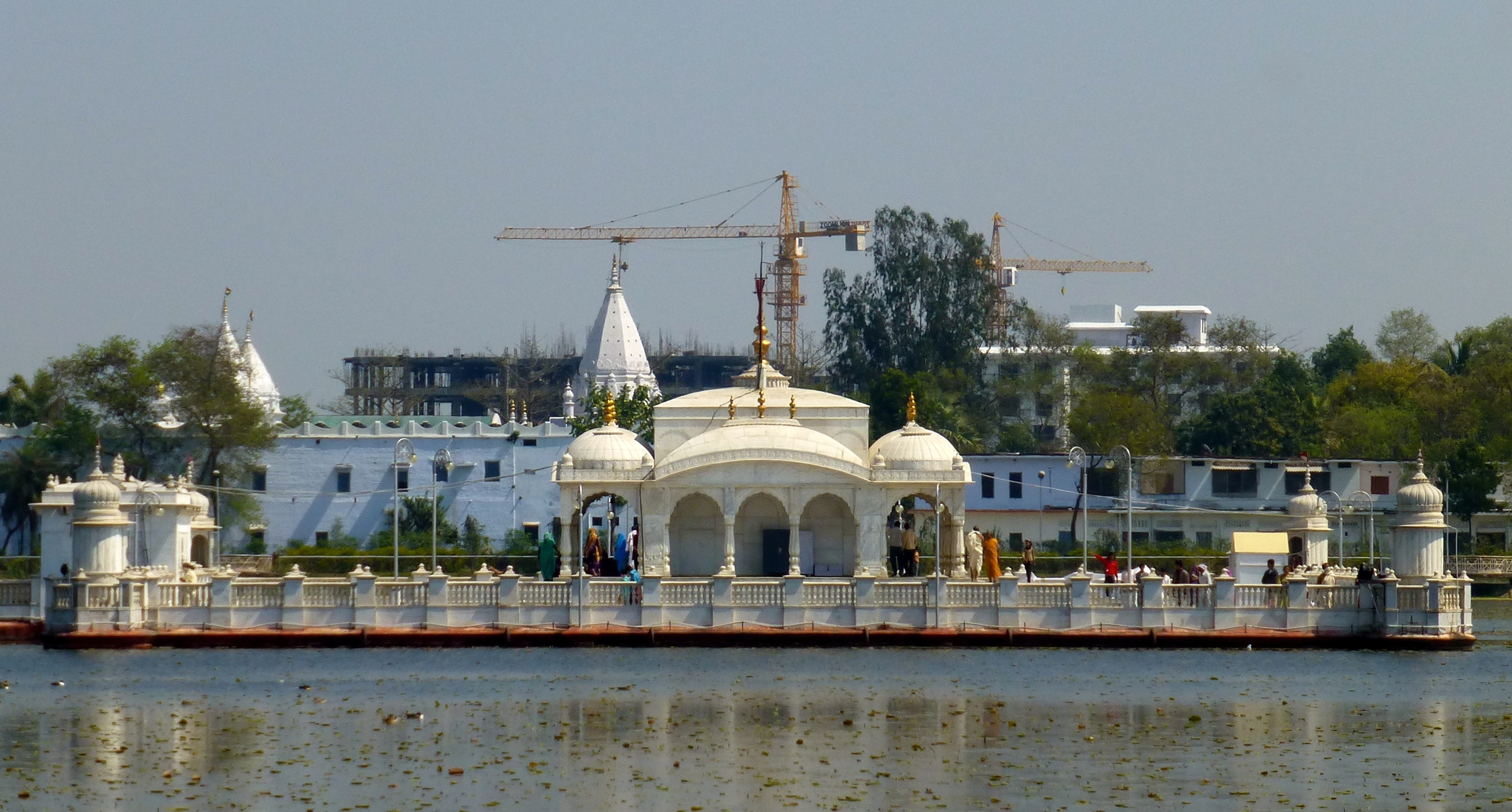
Lord Mahavira's Jal Mandir (water temple) in Pawapuri, Bihar, India

Pawapuri, a town located in the Nalanda district of Bihar, is the most sacred pilgrimage site associated with Mahavira. Jain tradition dictates that in 527 BCE, Mahavira delivered his final sermon and attained liberation from the cycle of birth and death (moksha) at this exact location.

The epicenter of pilgrimage here is the Jal Mandir (Water Temple), a stunning white marble temple situated in the middle of a large lotus-filled lake. According to regional legend, the lake was naturally formed after Mahavira's nirvana, when throngs of devoted followers removed the soil around his funeral pyre to keep as sacred ash, creating a massive depression that filled with water. A footprint (charan) of Mahavira is enshrined within the temple, drawing thousands of pilgrims annually, particularly during the festival of Diwali, which commemorates his nirvana.

=== Sites of Birth and Omniscience ===
While modern historians heavily debate the exact historical location of his birthplace (often identifying it near Vaishali in Bihar), traditional Jain pilgrimage circuits revere Kundalpur (in Nalanda) or Kshatriyakund (in Jamui) as his birthplace, with significant temple complexes built to commemorate his early royal life.

Located on the banks of the Rijuvalika River, this is the venerated site where Mahavira, after twelve and a half years of intense asceticism, attained Kevala Jnana (infinite knowledge or omniscience) under a Sal tree.

=== Significant Temples ===
Numerous temple complexes across India and within the Jain diaspora are dedicated to Mahavira.

In western India, the Mahavira Jain temple, Osian, Rajasthan, was constructed in the late 8th century during the Gurjara-Pratihara dynasty and is the oldest surviving Jain temple in the region. The site is historically associated with the regional spread of the Śvētāmbara sect. Other notable shrines in Rajasthan include the Shri Mahavirji pilgrimage complex, the Muchhal Mahavir Temple, and the Bhandavapur Jain Tirth. In neighboring Gujarat, the Kumbharia Mahavira Temple serves as a principal site of worship.

In southern India and Maharashtra, the Meguti Jain temple in Aihole, Karnataka, was built by Chalukyas in 634 CE on a hillock. The temple contains the Aihole inscription composed by the poet Ravikirti and represents an early stage in the development of Dravidian architecture. In Tamil Nadu, the Trilokyanatha Temple in Kanchipuram is a Pallava-era complex featuring medieval murals depicting the life of Mahavira; it historically functioned as a center for the Digambara sect. The Seeyamangalam cave temple in Tamil Nadu is a 9th-century Jain rock-cut site associated with the Western Ganga king Rachamalla II. Additional regional temples include the Jain temple in Tirumalai (Tamil Nadu), the Sankighatta temple in Karnataka, and the Dharmachakra temple at Gajpanth in Maharashtra.

In northeastern India, the Dimapur Jain Temple in Nagaland is dedicated to Mahavira. Internationally, temple complexes serving the Jain diaspora feature prominent shrines to him, including the Jain temple in Potters Bar, United Kingdom, and the Jain Center of Greater Phoenix in the United States.

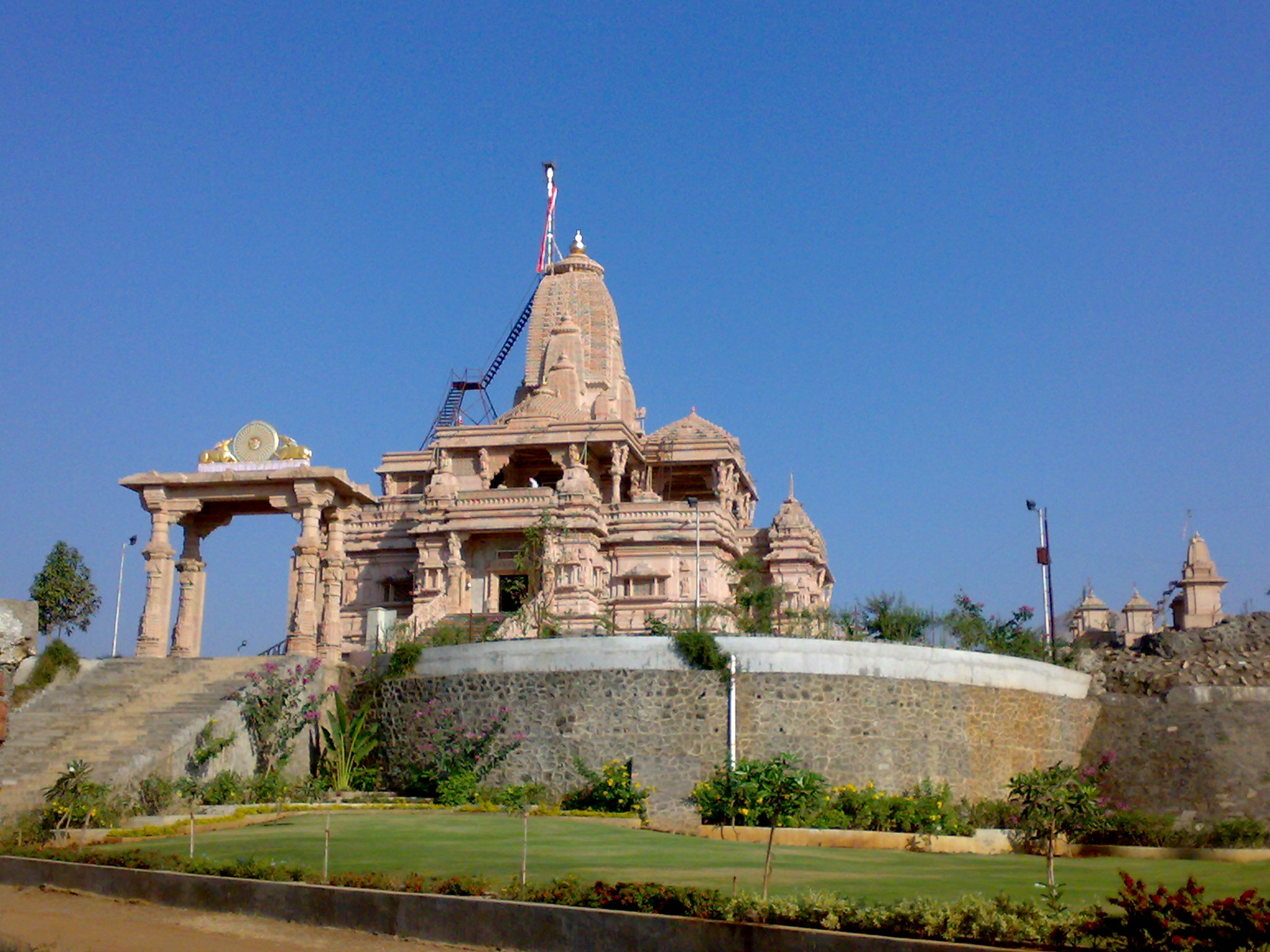
Dharmachakra temple in Gajpanth

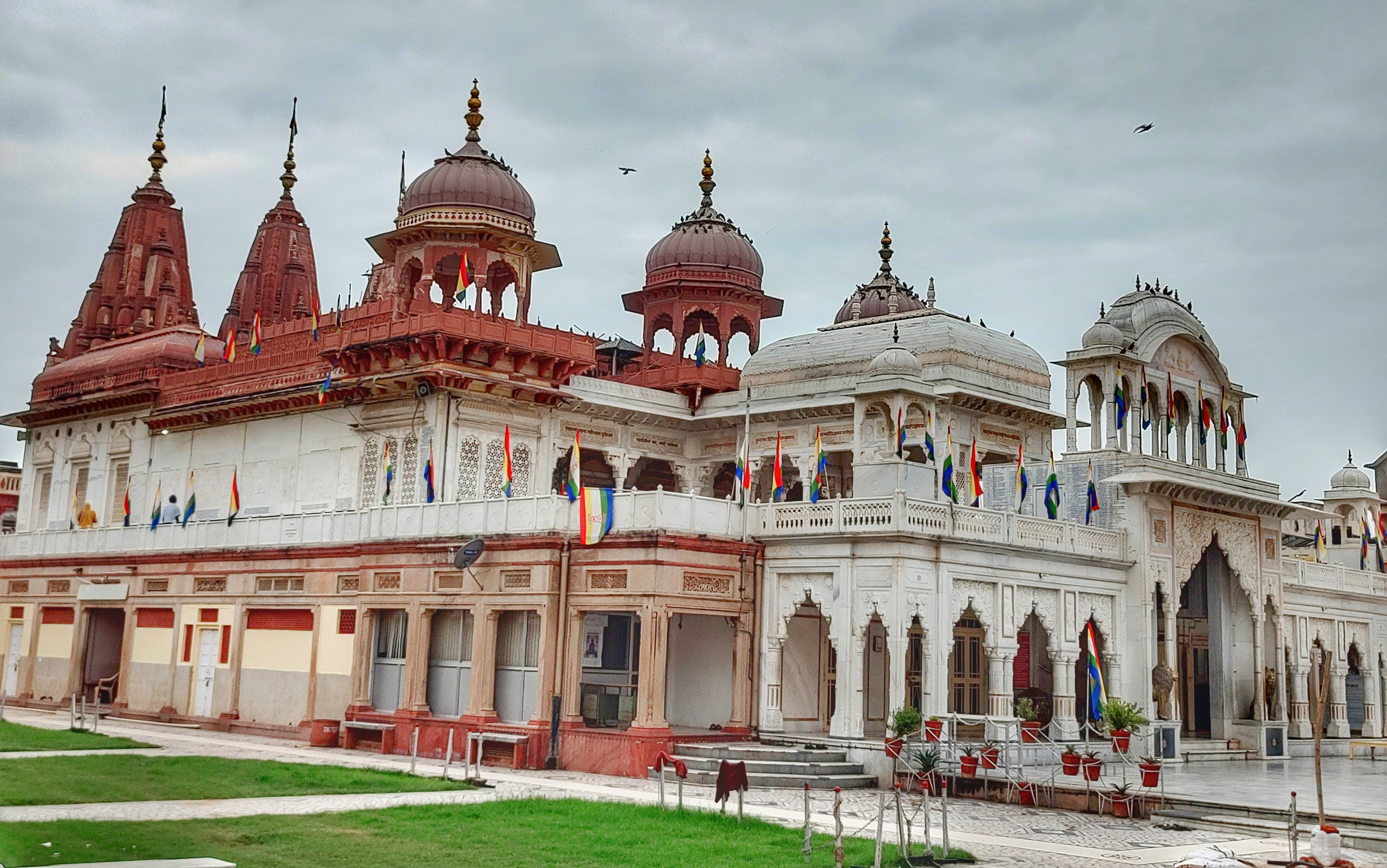
Shri Mahavirji

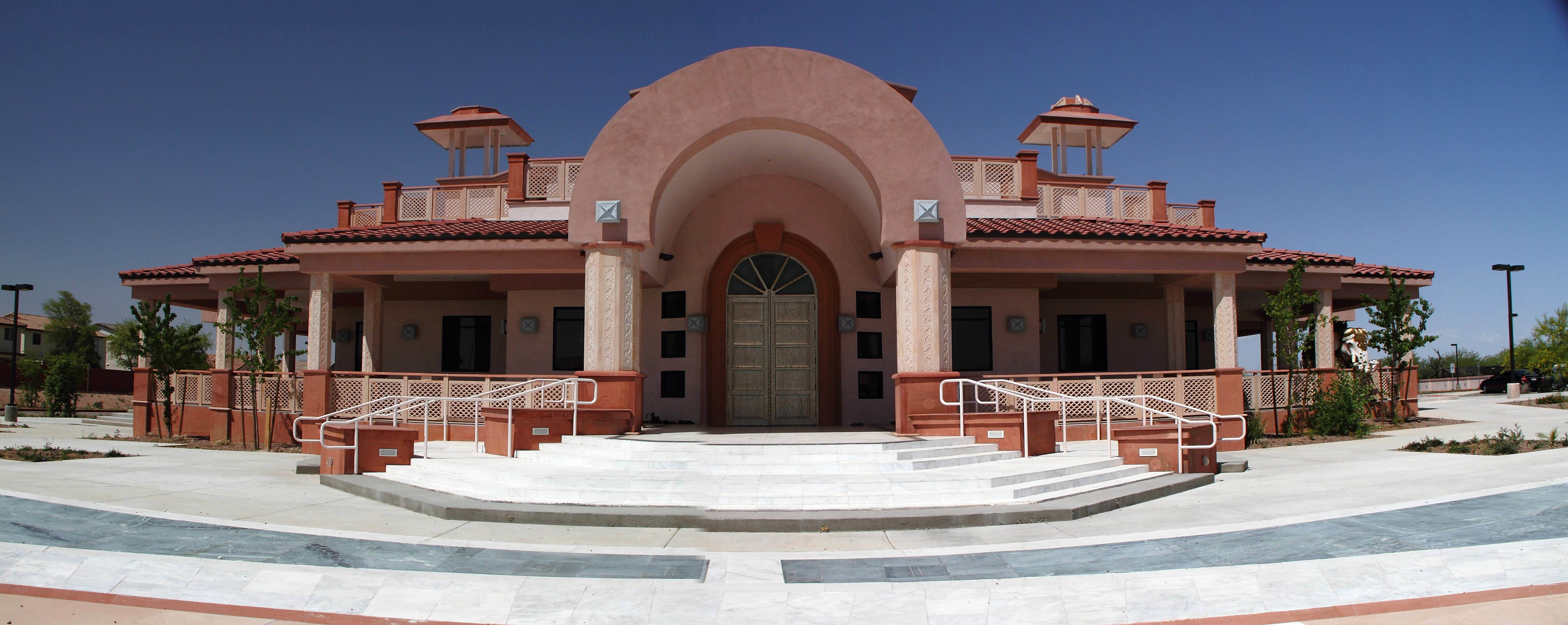
Jain Center of Greater Phoenix

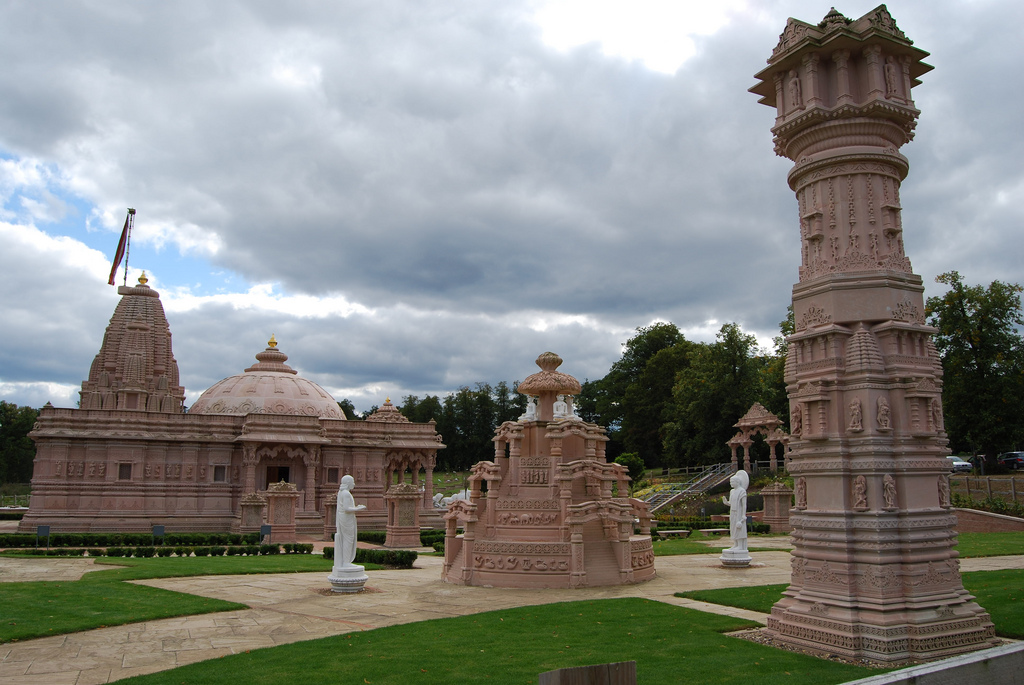
Oshwal Centre Jain Temple, Potters Bar

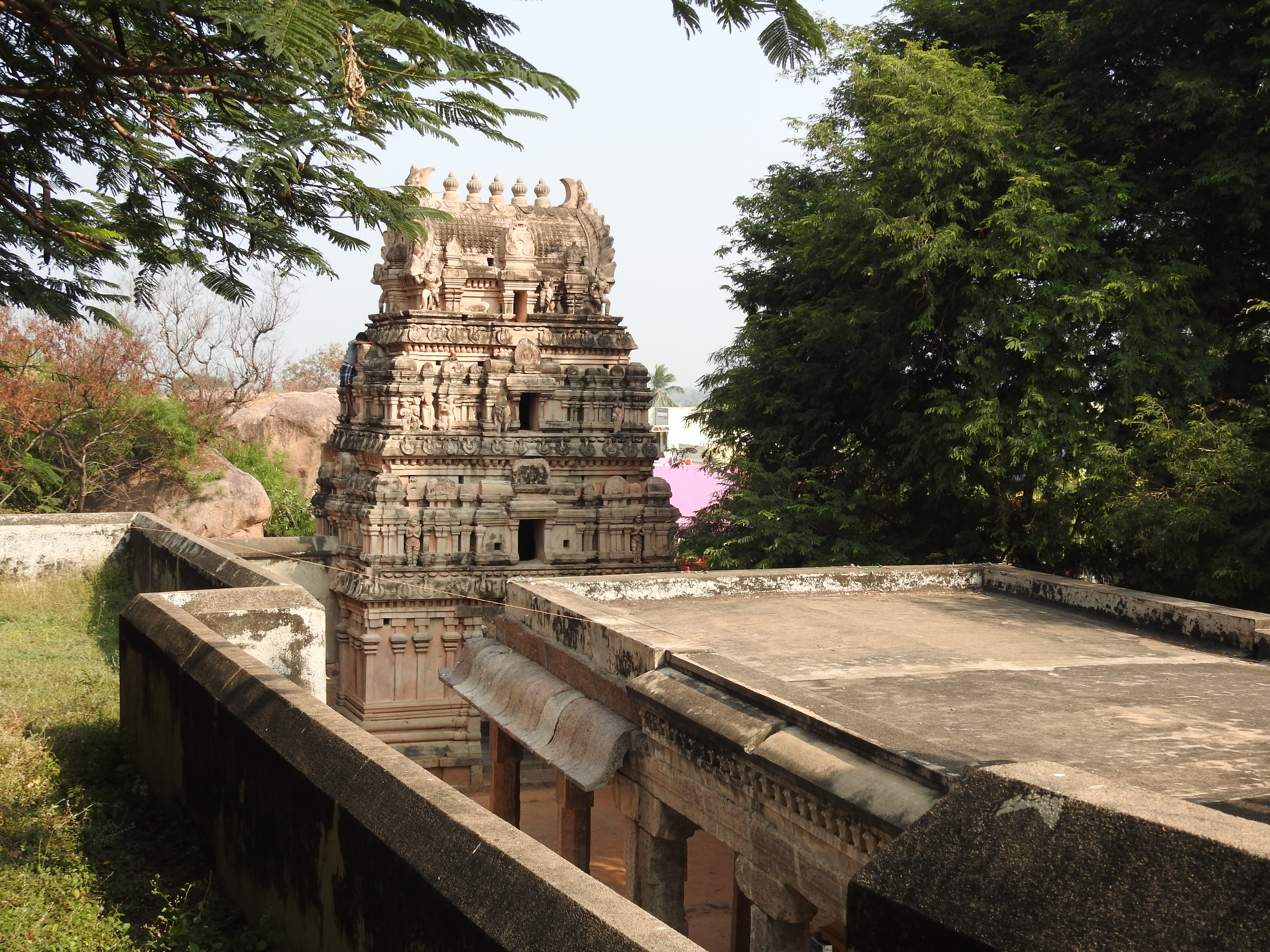
Jain Temple in Tirumalai, Tamil Nadu

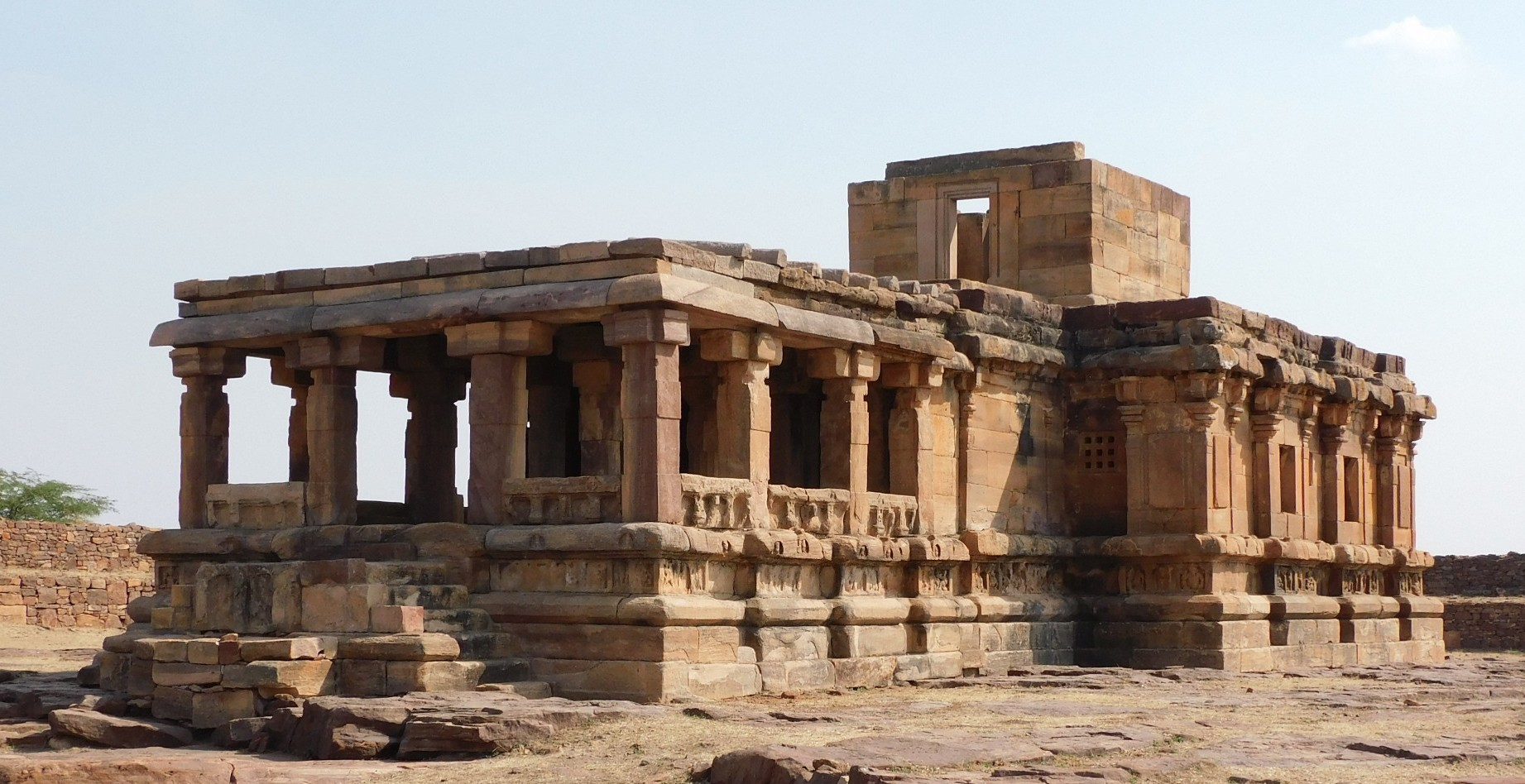
Meguti Jain temple, 5th—6th century

== Iconography and presentations ==
=== Names and epithets ===
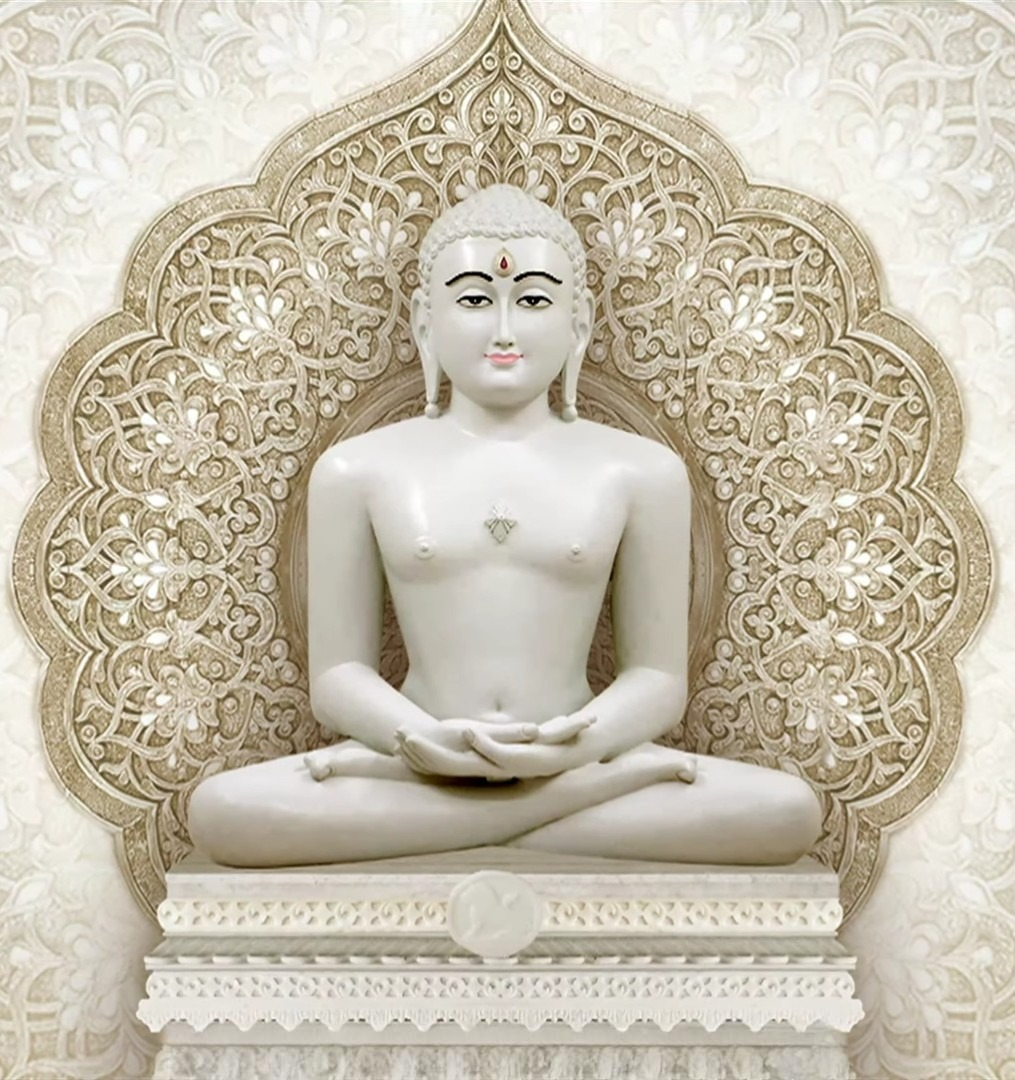
Rendering of the Idol of Lord Mahavira in lotus posture depicted in Svetambar iconography at Shri Dharampur Tirth, Valsad.

Surviving early Jain and Buddhist literature uses several names (or epithets) for Mahavira, including Nayaputta, Muni, Samana, Nigantha, Bamaṇa, and Bhagavan. In early Buddhist sutras, he is referred to as Araha ("worthy") and Veyavi (derived from "Vedas", but meaning "wise"). He is known as Sramana in the Kalpa Sūtra, "devoid of love and hate".

According to later Jain texts, Mahavira's childhood name was Vardhamāna ("the one who grows") because of the kingdom's prosperity at the time of his birth. According to the Kalpa Sūtra, he was called Mahavira ("the great hero") by the gods in the Kalpa Sūtra because he remained steadfast in the midst of dangers, fears, hardships and calamities. He is also known as a tirthankara.

=== Iconography ===
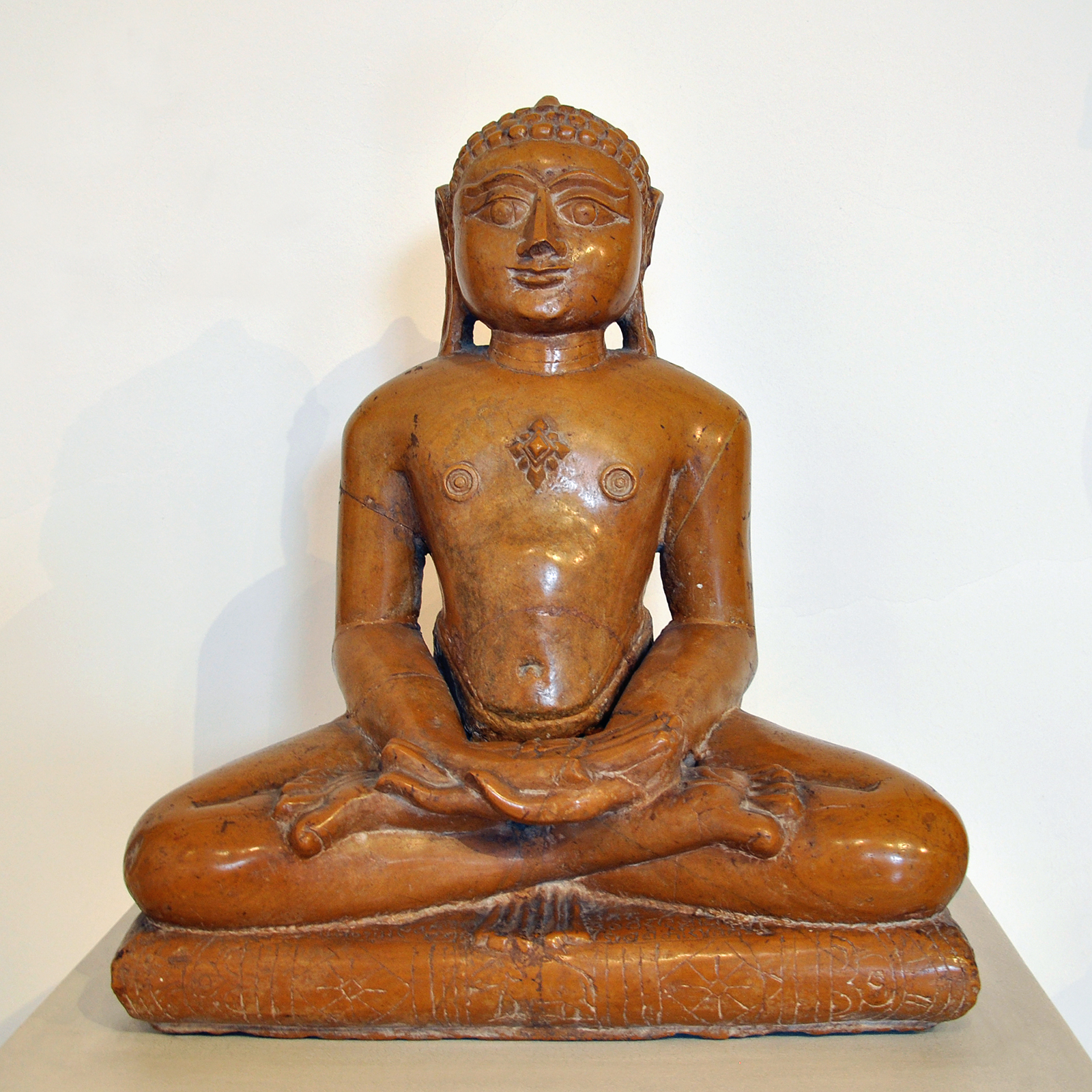
Mahavira iconography is distinguished by a lion stamped (or carved) beneath his feet; a Shrivatsa is on his chest.

Mahavira is usually depicted in a sitting (or standing) meditative pose, with a lion symbol beneath him; each tirthankara has a distinct emblem, which allows worshippers to distinguish similar idols. Mahavira's lion emblem is usually carved below his legs. Like all tirthankaras, he is depicted with a Shrivatsa in Shetamber tradition. (Note: A special symbol that marks the chest of a tirthankara.) The yoga pose is very common in Buddhism, Hinduism, and Jainism. Each tradition has had a distinctive auspicious chest mark that allows devotees to identify a meditating statue to symbolic icon for their theology. There are several srivasta found in ancient and medieval Jain art works, and these are not found on Buddhist or Hindu art works. and downcast eyes in digamber tradition while in Shetamber tradition it is wide open.

Mahavira's earliest iconography is from archaeological sites in the north Indian city of Mathura, dated from the 1st century BCE to the 2nd century CE. The Vasu Śilāpaṭa, a circa 1st century CE ayagapata excavated from Kankali Tila, is a tablet of homage with invocation to Arhat Vardhamana, or Mahavira. The srivatsa mark on his chest and his dhyana-mudra posture appears in Kushana Empire-era artwork. Differences in Mahavira's depiction between the Digambara and Svetambara traditions appear in the late 5th century CE. According to John Cort, the earliest archaeological evidence of Jina iconography with inscriptions precedes its datable texts by over 250 years.

Many images of Mahavira have been dated to the 12th century and earlier; an ancient sculpture was found in a cave in Sundarajapuram, Theni district, Tamil Nadu. K. Ajithadoss, a Jain scholar in Chennai, dated it to the 9th century.

Jivantasvami represents Mahavira as a princely state. The Jina is represented as standing in the kayotsarga pose wearing crown and ornaments.

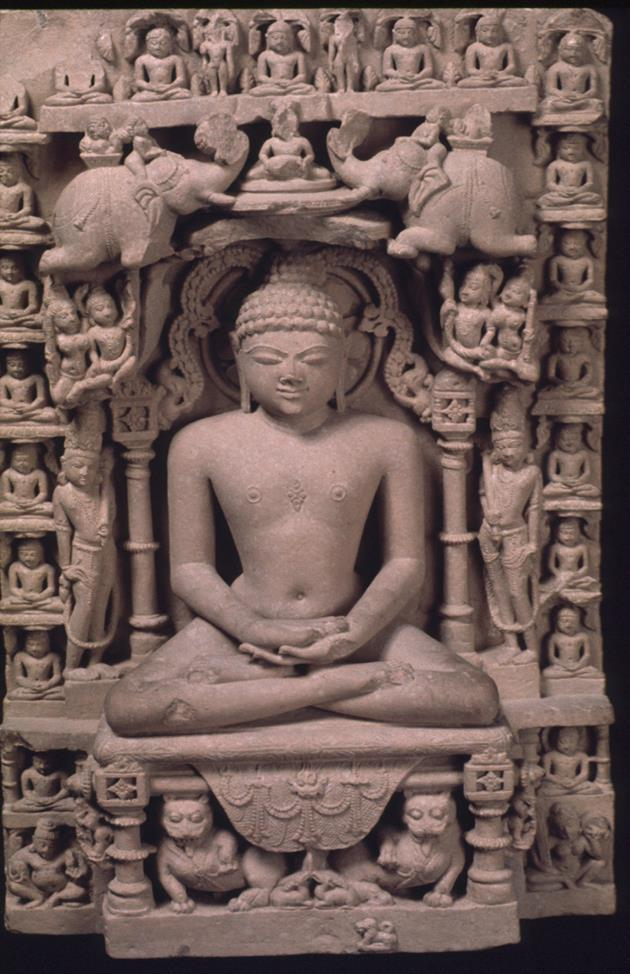
An 11th century CE sculpture of Mahavira seated in meditation on a lion throne

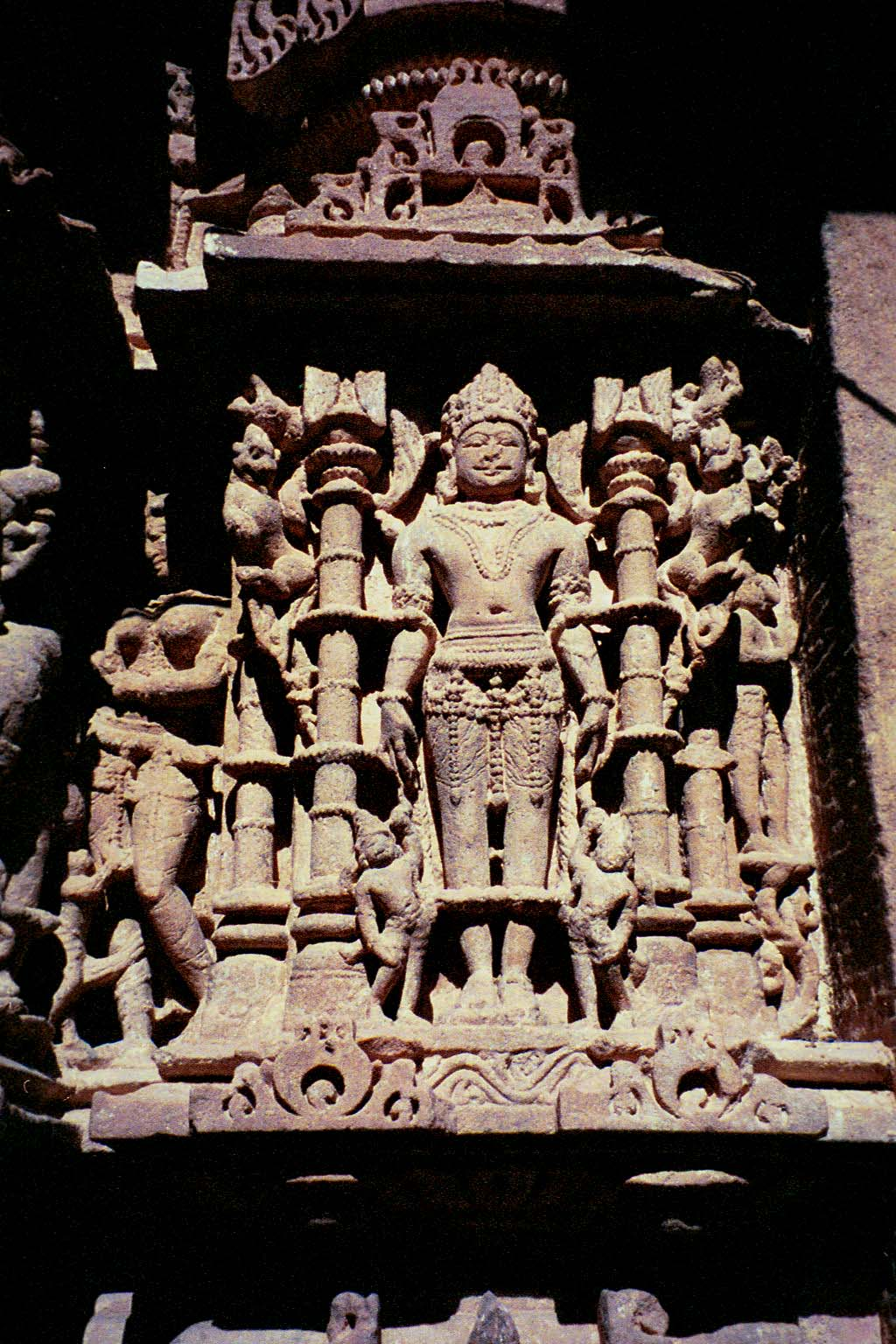
Jivantasvami image of a Tirthankara carved on Torana in Mahavira Jain temple, Osian

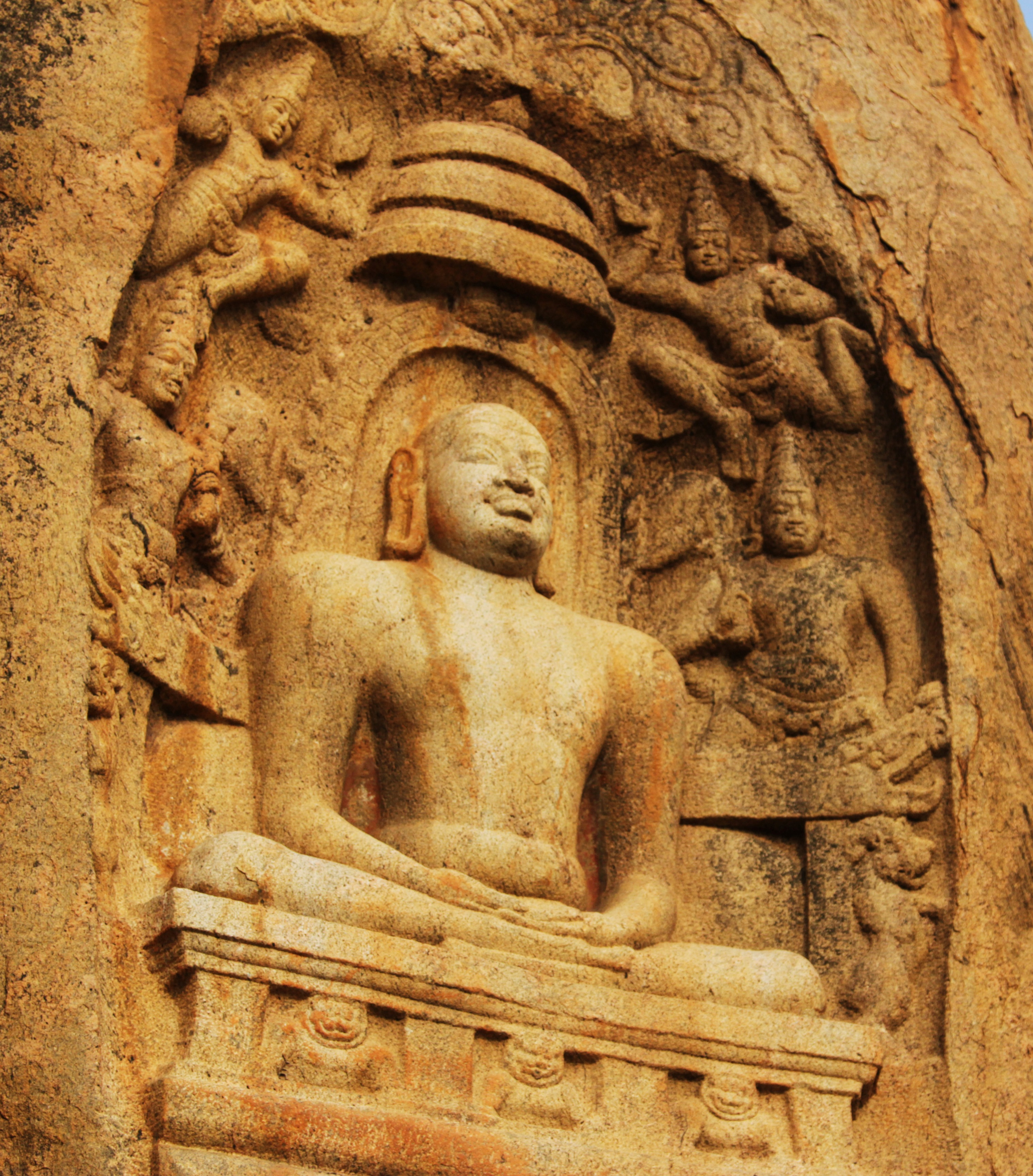
Rock-cut sculpture of Mahavira in Samanar Hills, Madurai, Tamil Nadu

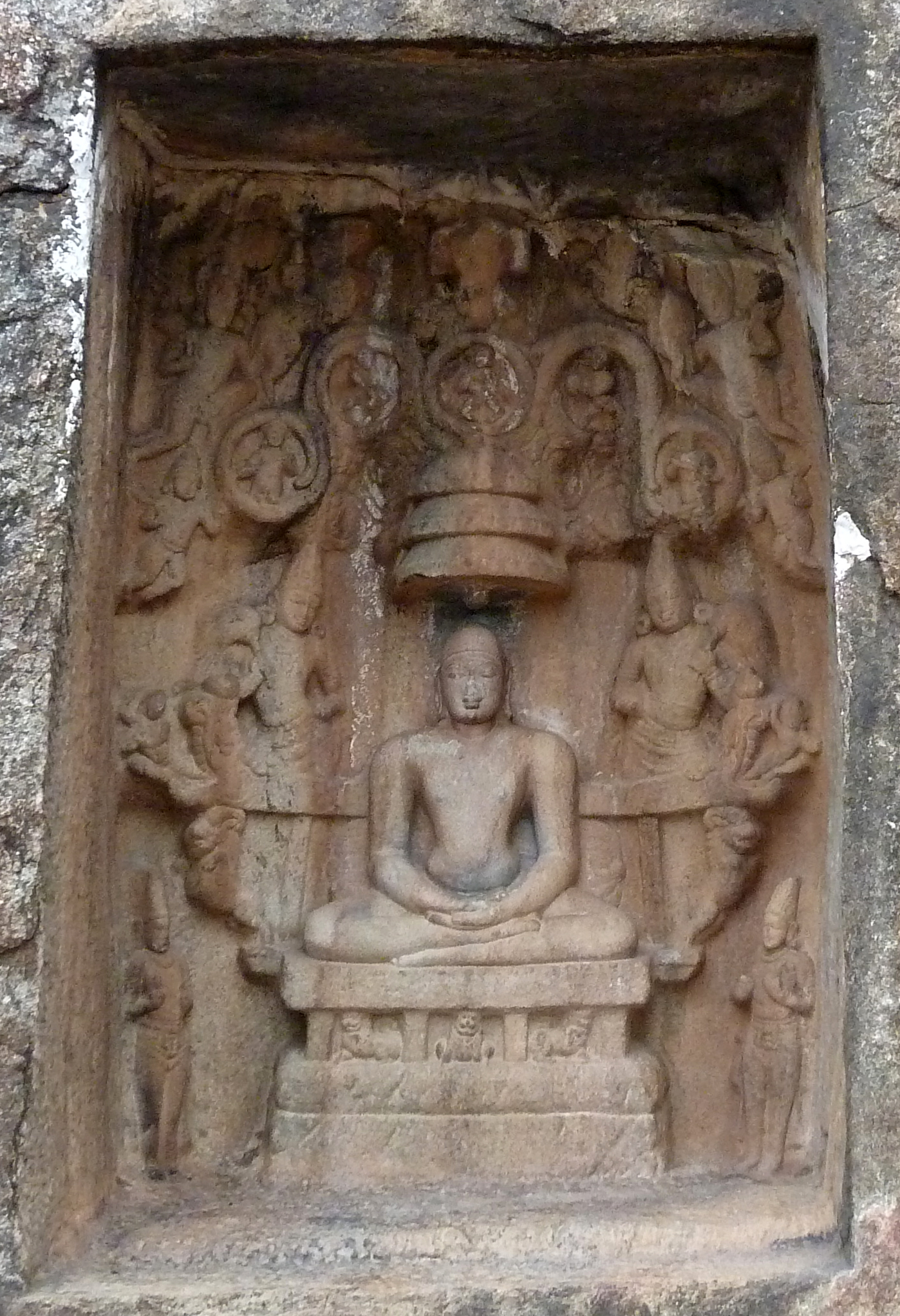
Rock-cut sculpture of Mahavira in Kalugumalai Jain Beds, 8th century

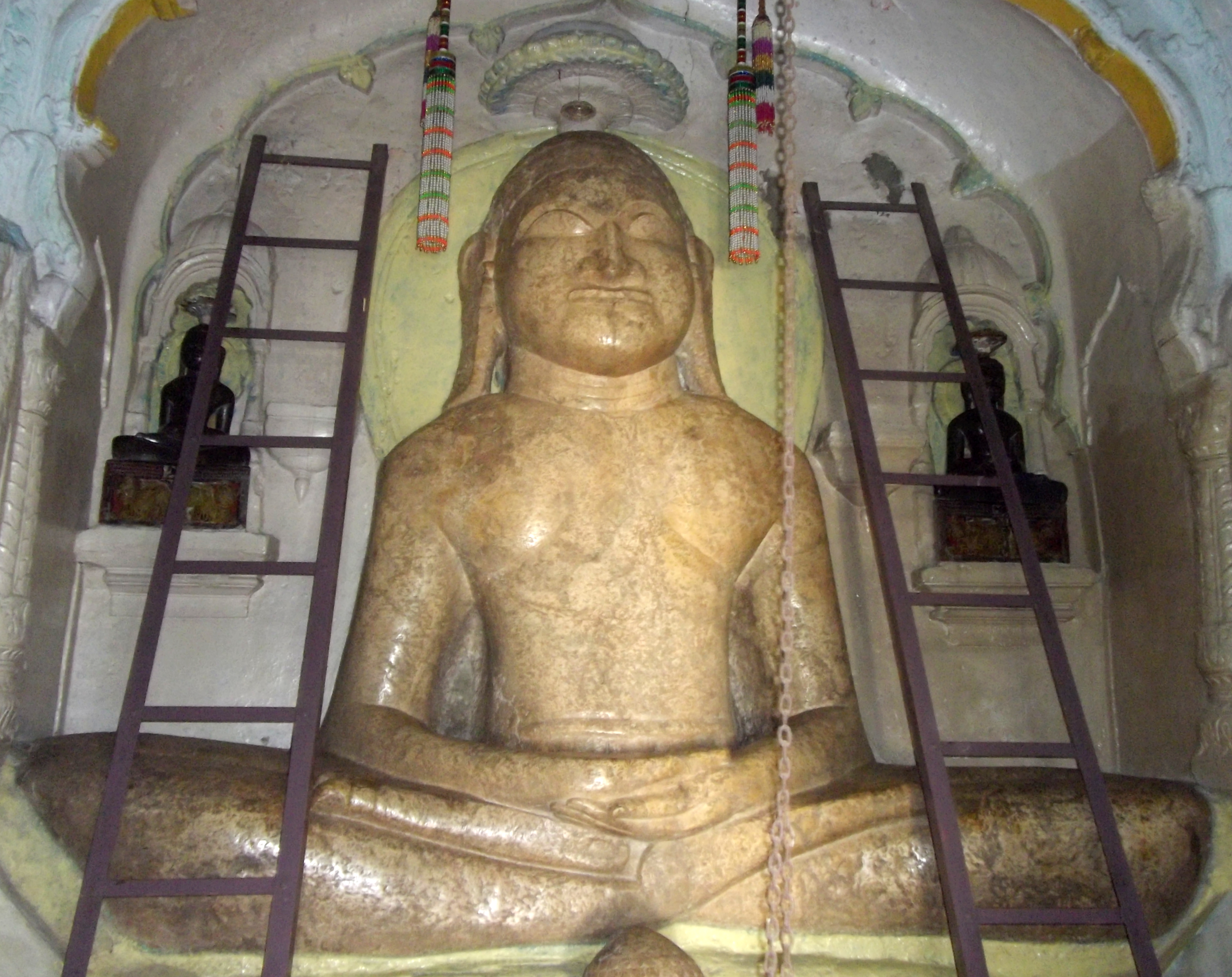
Tallest known image of the seated Mahavira, Patnaganj

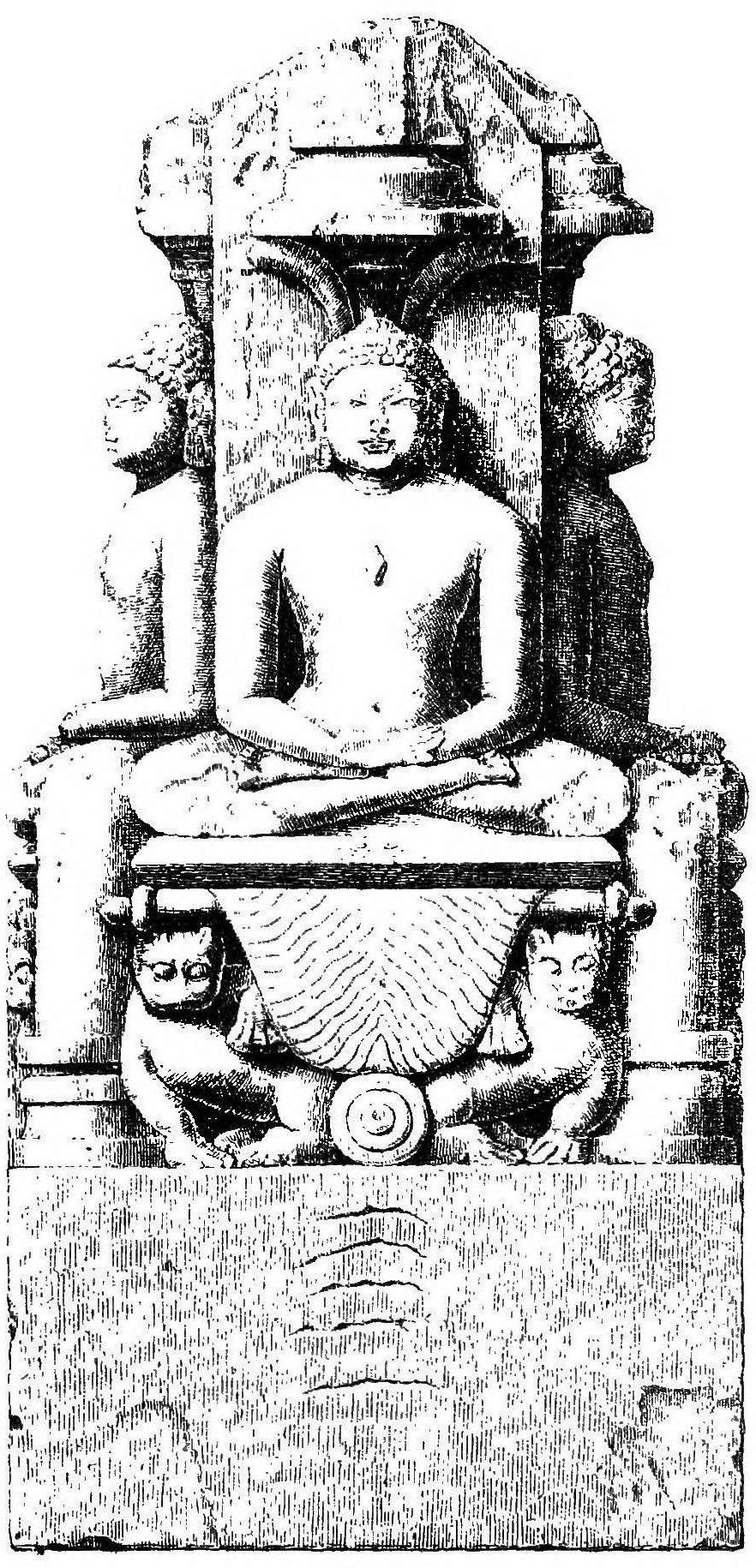
Four-sided sculpture of Mahavira in Kankali Tila, Mathura

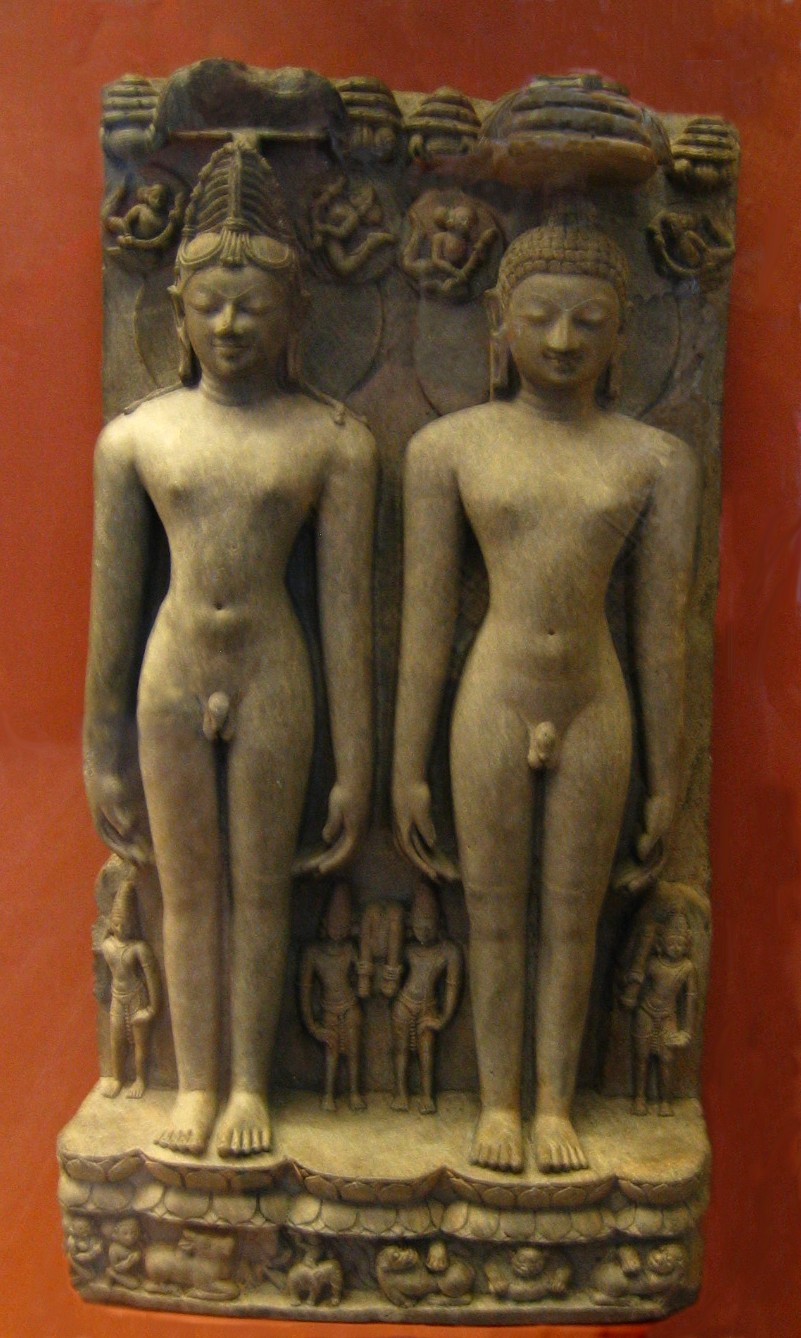
Tirthankaras Rishabhanatha (left) and Mahavira, 11th century (British Museum)

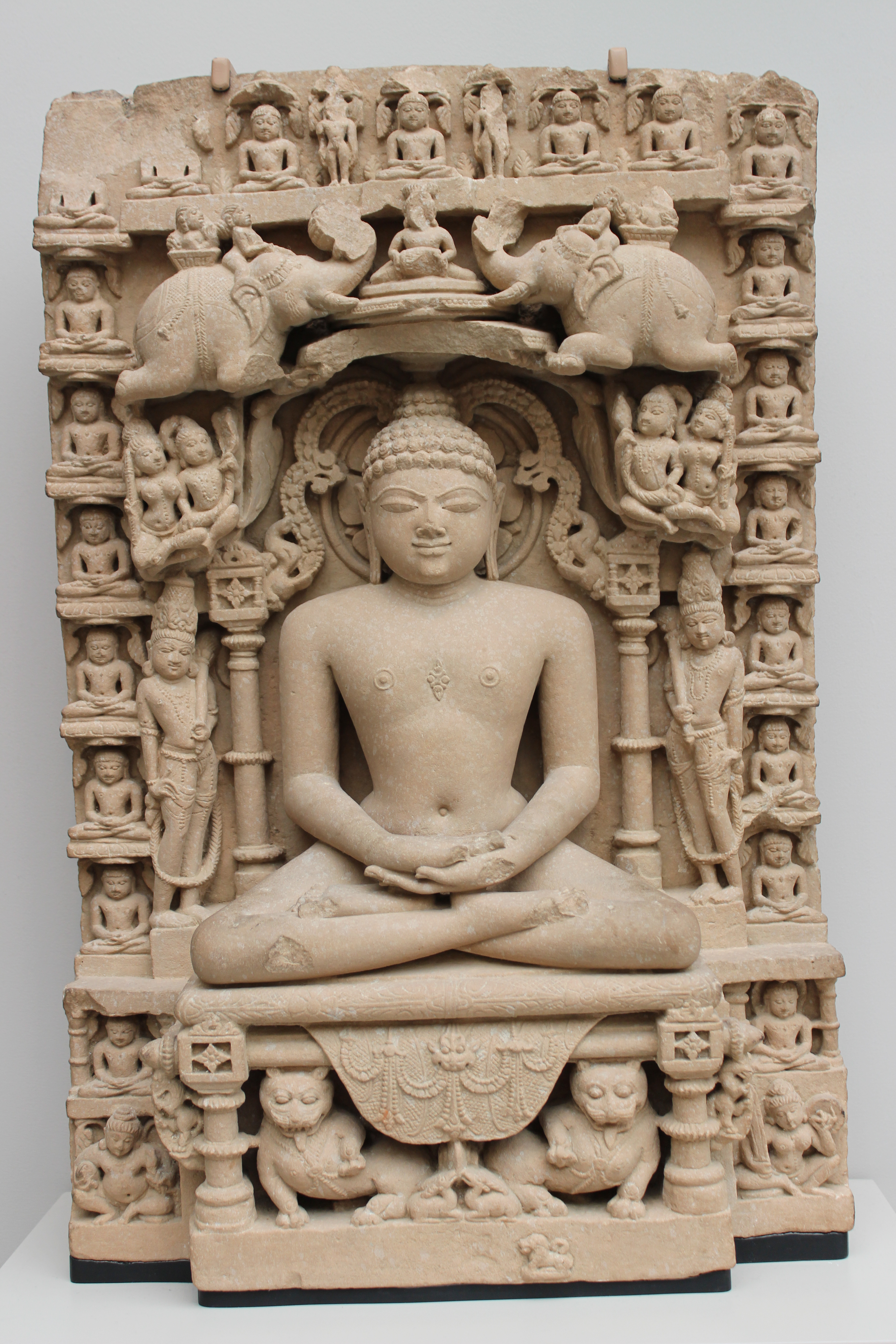
Temple relief of Mahavira, 14th century (Seattle Asian Art Museum)

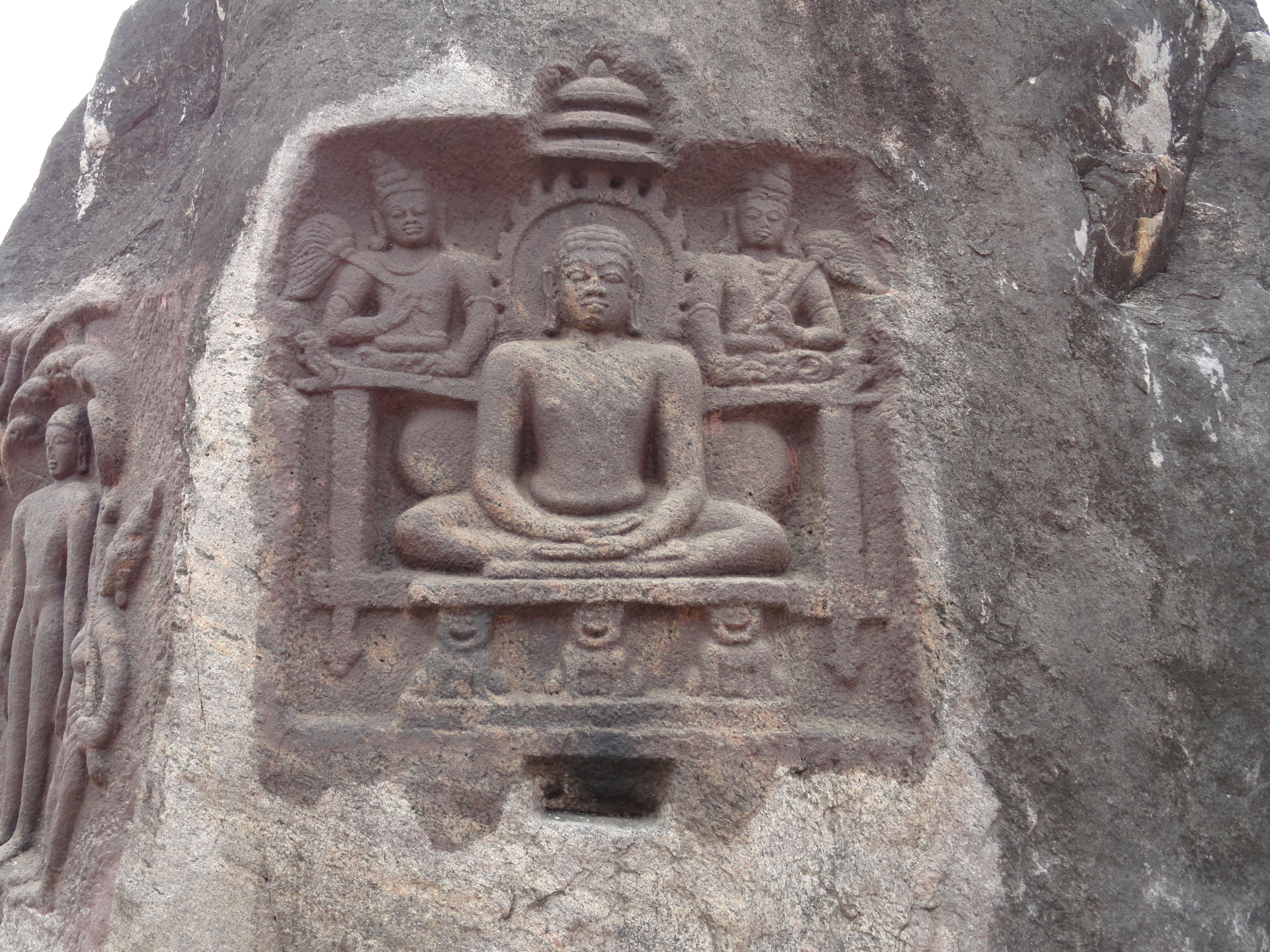
Relief of Mahavira in Thirakoil, Tamil Nadu

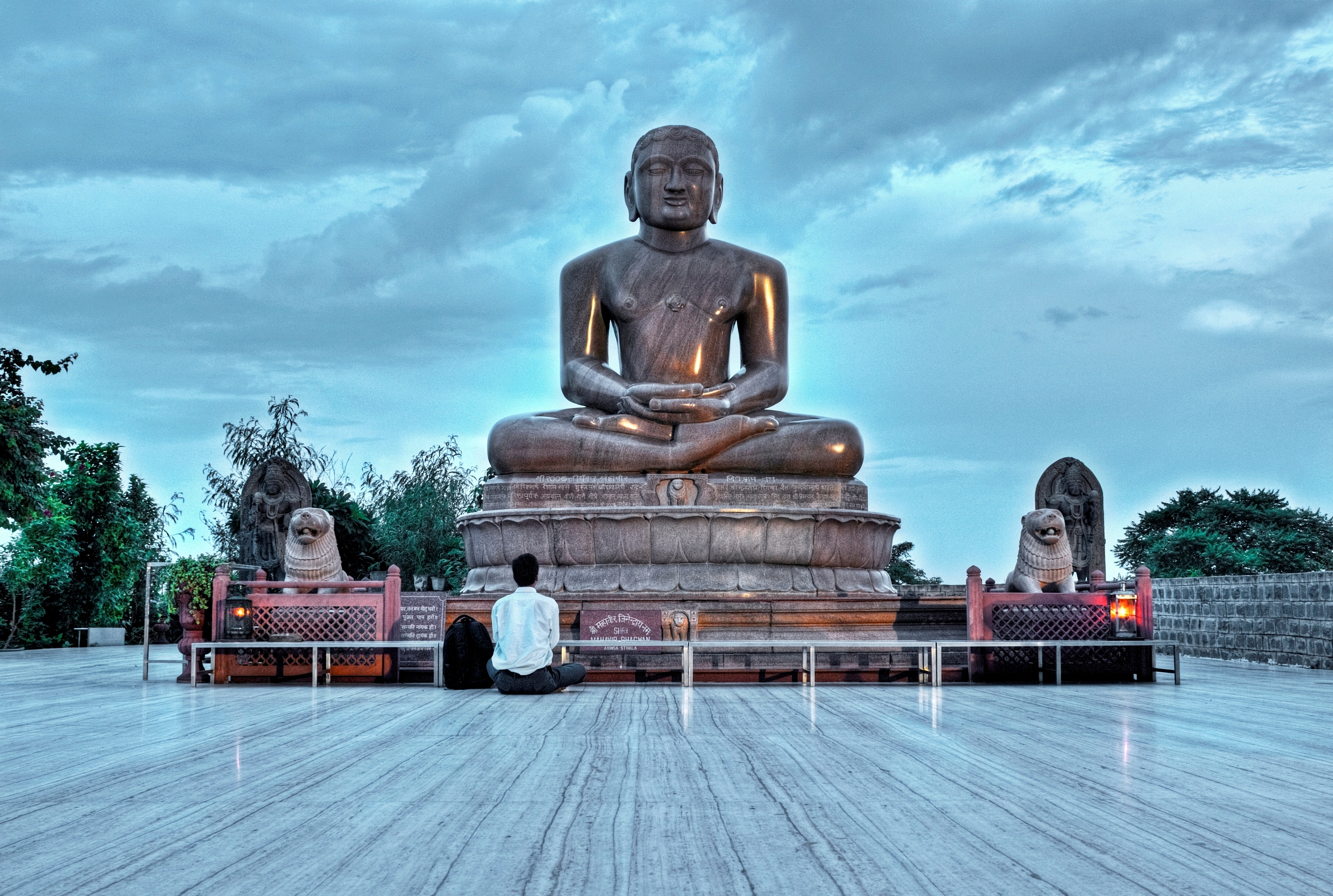
16-foot, 2-inch stone statue of Mahavira in Ahinsa Sthal, Mehrauli, New Delhi

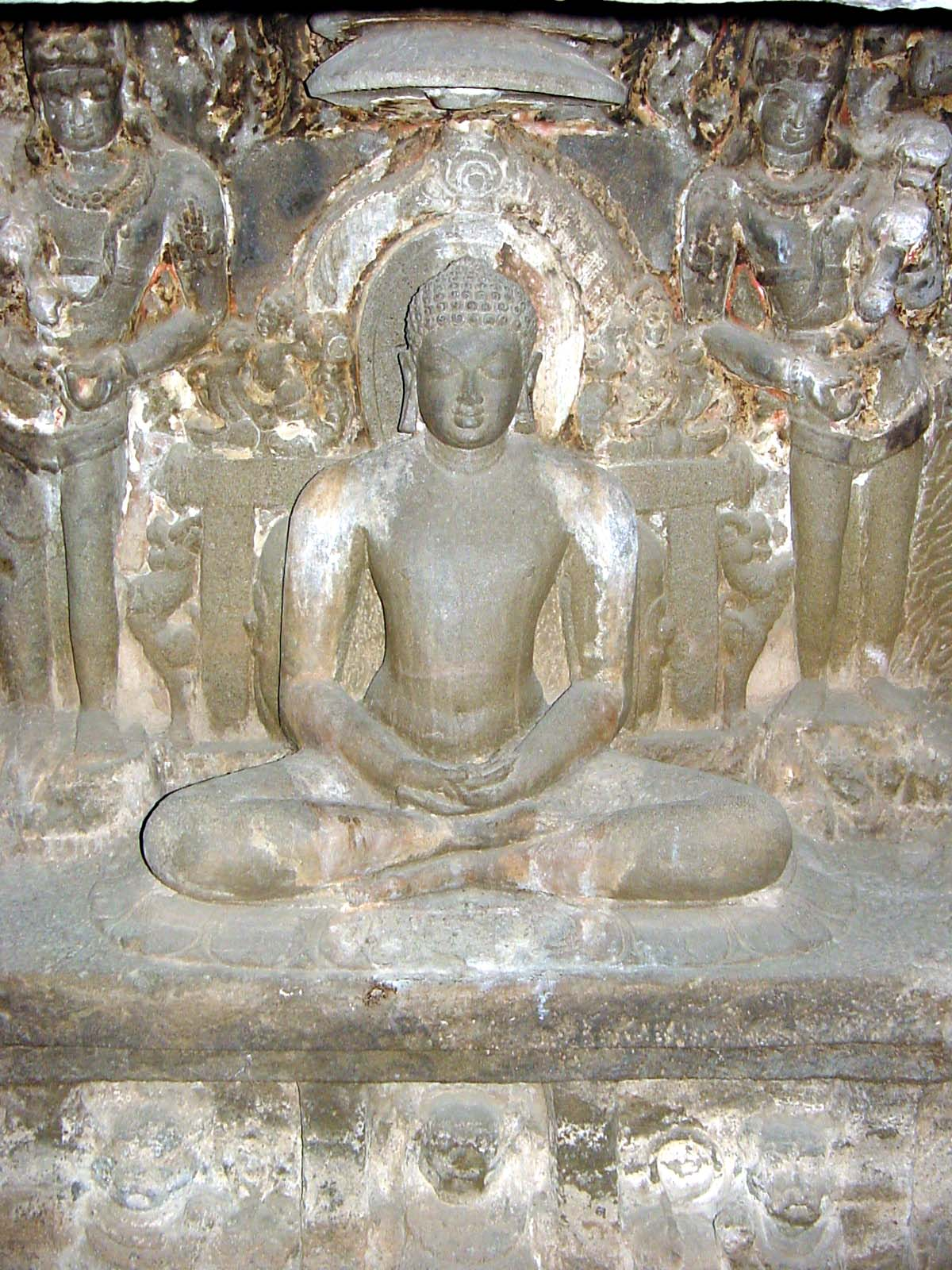
Mahavira statue in Cave 32 of the Ellora Caves

=== Worship ===
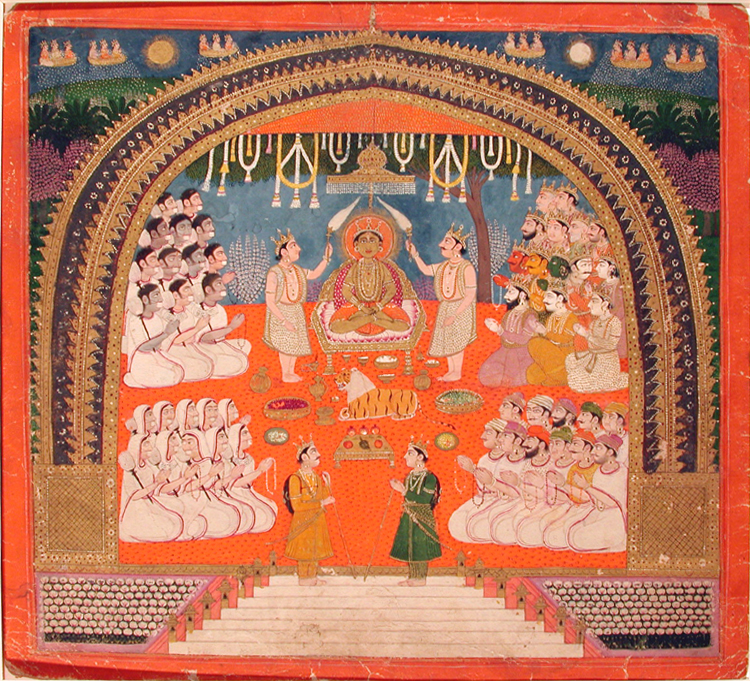
Mahavira worship in a manuscript c. 1825

Samantabhadra's Svayambhustotra praises the twenty-four tirthankaras, and its eight shlokas (songs) adore Mahavira. One such shloka reads:

O Lord Jina! Your doctrine that expounds essential attributes required of a potential aspirant to cross over the ocean of worldly existence (Saṃsāra) reigns supreme even in this strife-ridden spoke of time (Pancham Kaal). Accomplished sages who have invalidated the so-called deities that are famous in the world, and have made ineffective the whip of all blemishes, adore your doctrine.

Samantabhadra's Yuktyanusasana is a 64-verse poem which also praises Mahavira.

=== Festivals ===
Two major annual Jain festivals associated with Mahavira are Mahavir Janma Kalyanak and Diwali. During Mahavir Janma Kalyanak, Jains celebrate Mahavira's birth as the 24th and last tirthankara of avasarpiṇī (the current time cycle). During Mahavir Janma Kalyanak, the five auspicious events of Mahavira's life are re-enacted. Diwali commemorates the anniversary of Mahavira's nirvana, and is celebrated at the same time as the Hindu festival. Diwali marks the New Year for Jains. Jains celebrate Mahavir Janma Kalyanak every year on the 13th day of the Indian Calendar month of Chaitra.

=== Ancient idols ===
Archaeological evidence for Mahavira's veneration in western India was recovered from the Akota hoard in Gujarat. This excavation yielded a bronze idol of Mahavira as Jivantasvami (the living lord), complete with an inscription dating the artifact to approximately 550 CE. Documented by art historian Umakant Premanand Shah, this specific artifact is recognized as the earliest known clothed Jain idol. It demonstrates the advanced metallurgical casting techniques of the post-Gupta, Maitraka era.

Further medieval artifacts were discovered in the Vasantgarh hoard in Rajasthan. Dating from the 7th to the 11th centuries CE, this collection includes bronze idols of Mahavira that highlight the regional evolution of western Indian metallurgy. Another significant archaeological discovery is the Hansi hoard, excavated from the Asigarh Fort in Haryana. Dating to the 8th and 9th centuries CE, this collection features several bronze idols of Mahavira seated in a meditative posture. Additionally, 11th-century Digambara bronzes were recovered from the Aluara hoard near Dhanbad, Jharkhand. Currently preserved at the Patna Museum, this hoard contains metallic representations of Mahavira that demonstrate the continuous geographical spread of his veneration.

== Legacy ==
Mahavira's legacy is the systematic codification of Jain philosophy and the establishment of the chaturvidha sangha (four-fold order) of monks, nuns, laymen, and laywomen. This structure, which provides a path for both ascetics and lay followers, enabled Jainism to be preserved as a living tradition. His teachings, particularly the cardinal vow of Ahimsa (non-violence), had a lasting influence on Indian culture.

Michael H. Hart ranked him 100th in his 1978 book, “The 100: A Ranking of the Most Influential Persons in History”, below the Buddha (ranked 4th) and Ashoka (ranked 53rd). According to Pantheon's 2024 Historical Popularity Index (HPI), Mahavira is ranked 19th among the most famous Indian people of all time.

Mahavira's teachings were influential. According to Rabindranath Tagore,

Mahavira proclaimed in India that religion is a reality and not a mere social convention. It is really true that salvation can not be had by merely observing external ceremonies. Religion cannot make any difference between man and man.

— Rabindranath Tagore

An event associated with the 2,500th anniversary of Mahavira's nirvana was held in 1974:

Probably few people in the West are aware that during this Anniversary year for the first time in their long history, the mendicants of the Śvētāmbara, Digambara and Sthānakavāsī sects assembled on the same platform, agreed upon a common flag (Jaina dhvaja) and emblem (pratīka); and resolved to bring about the unity of the community. For the duration of the year four dharma cakras, a wheel mounted on a chariot as an ancient symbol of the samavasaraṇa (Holy Assembly) of tīrthaṅkara Mahavira traversed to all the major cities of India, winning legal sanctions from various state governments against the slaughter of animals for sacrifice or other religious purposes, a campaign which has been a major preoccupation of the Jainas throughout their history.

— Padmanabh Jaini

== See also ==
- Jivantasvami
- Parshwanatha
- Arihant (Jainism)
- Jain iconography
- Bardhaman (city named after Mahavir Swami)
