= Jain sculpture =

Images depicting Tirthankaras (teaching gods)

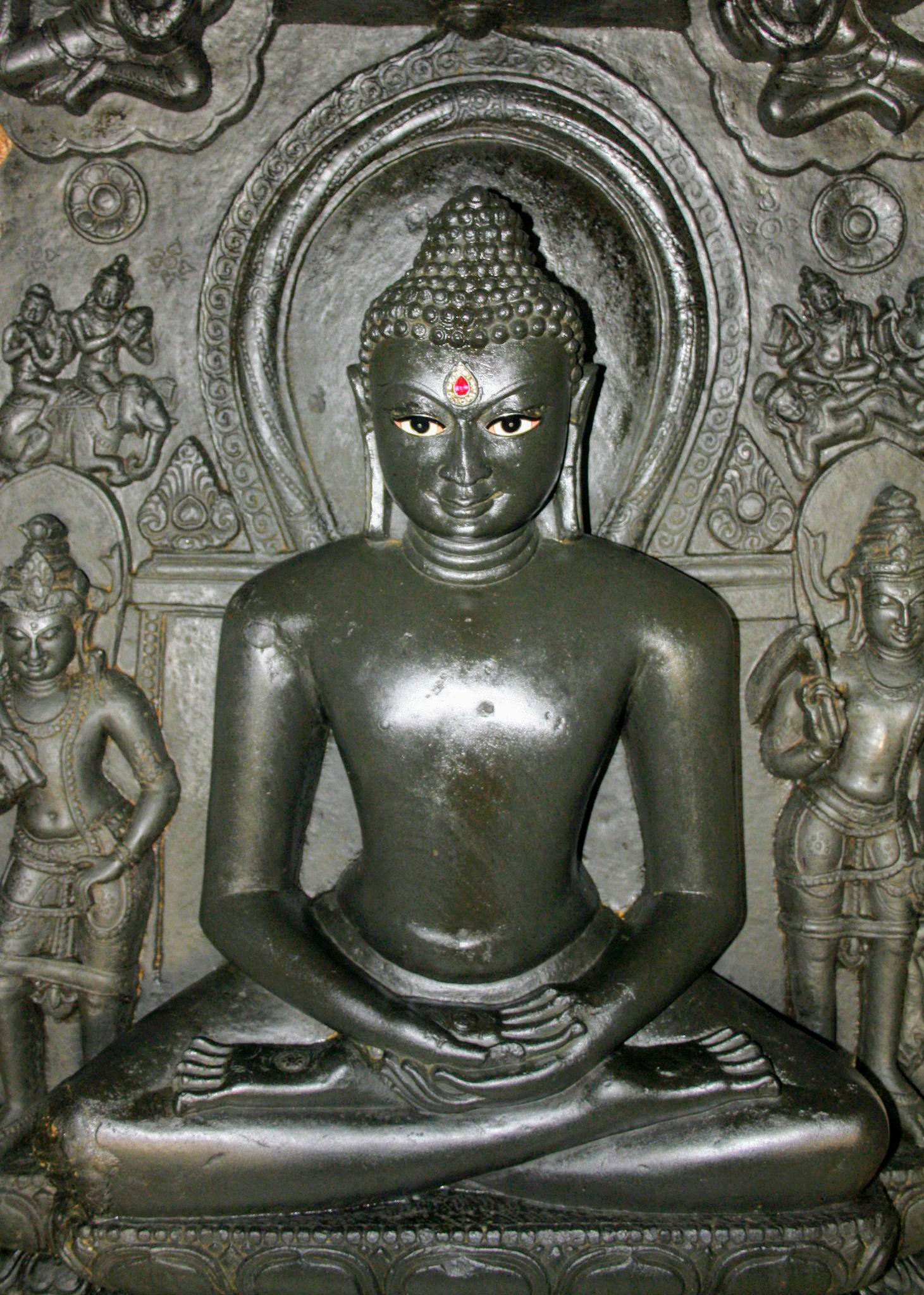
Murti of Mahavira at his birthplace, Kshatriyakund (Śvetāmbara tradition), in Bihar

Jain sculptures or Jain idols are the images depicting Tirthankaras (teaching gods). These images are worshiped by the followers of Jainism. The sculpture can depict any of the twenty-four tirthankaras with images depicting Parshvanatha, Rishabhanatha, or Mahāvīra being more popular. Jain sculptures are an example of Jain art. There is a long history of construction of Jain sculptures. Early examples include Lohanipur Torsos which has been regarded to be from the Maurya period, and images from the Kushan period from Mathura.

== Iconography ==
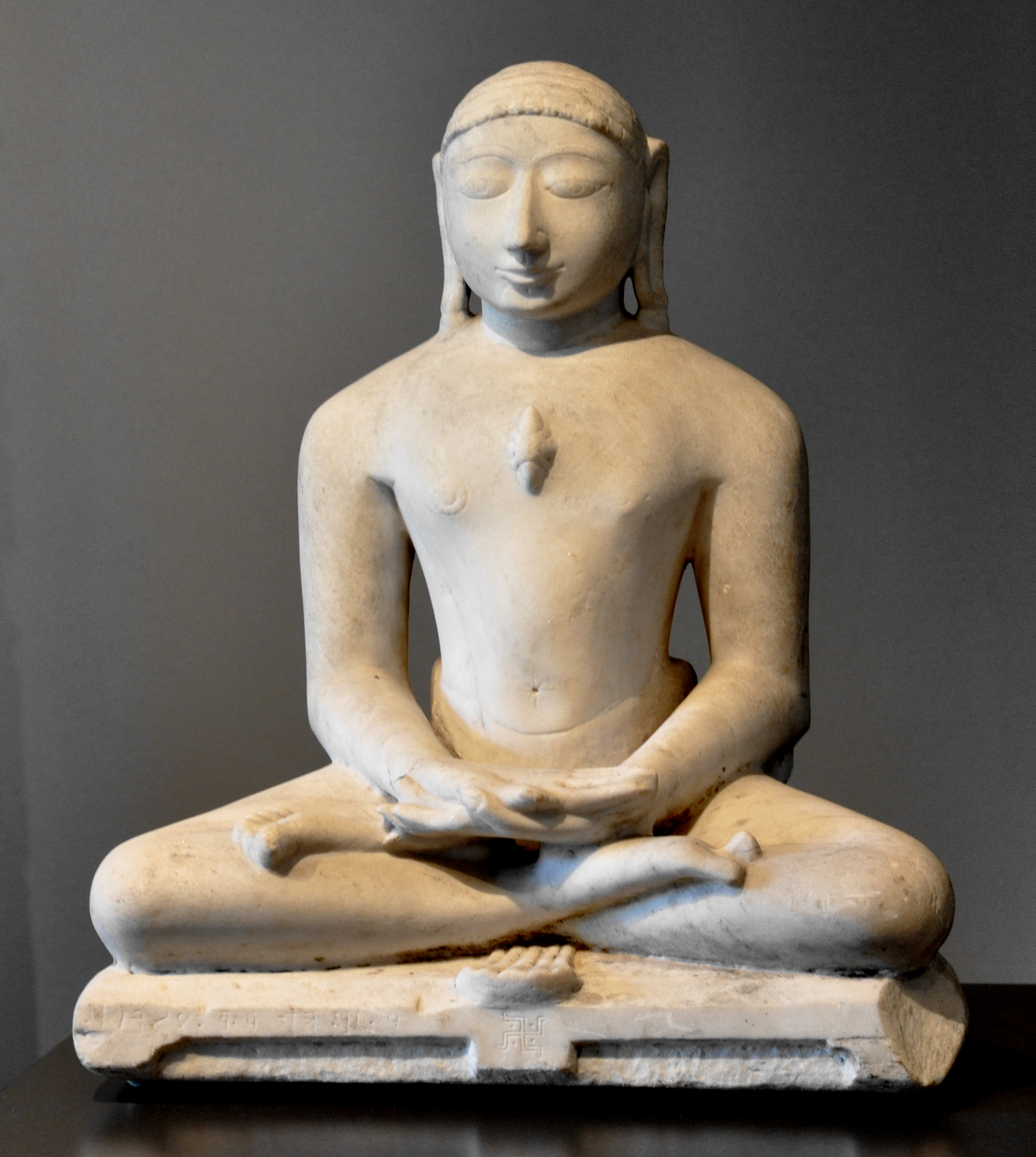
Image depicting Suparshvanatha, the seventh tirthankara of present half cycle of time

The Jain idols are males depicted in both sitting and standing postures. The tīrthaṅkaras are represented either Padmasana (seated in yoga posture) or standing in the Kayotsarga posture. Parshvanatha statues are usually depicted with a snake crown on head, Bahubali statues are usually depicted covered with creepers. However, there are a few differences in Digambara and Śvetāmbara depiction of idols. Digambara images are naked without any beautification whereas Śvetāmbara ones are clothed and decorated with temporary ornaments.

=== Jivantasvami ===
The Jivantasvami images represent Lord Mahavira (and in some cases other Tirthankaras) as a prince, with a crown and ornaments. The Jina is represented as standing in the kayotsarga pose.

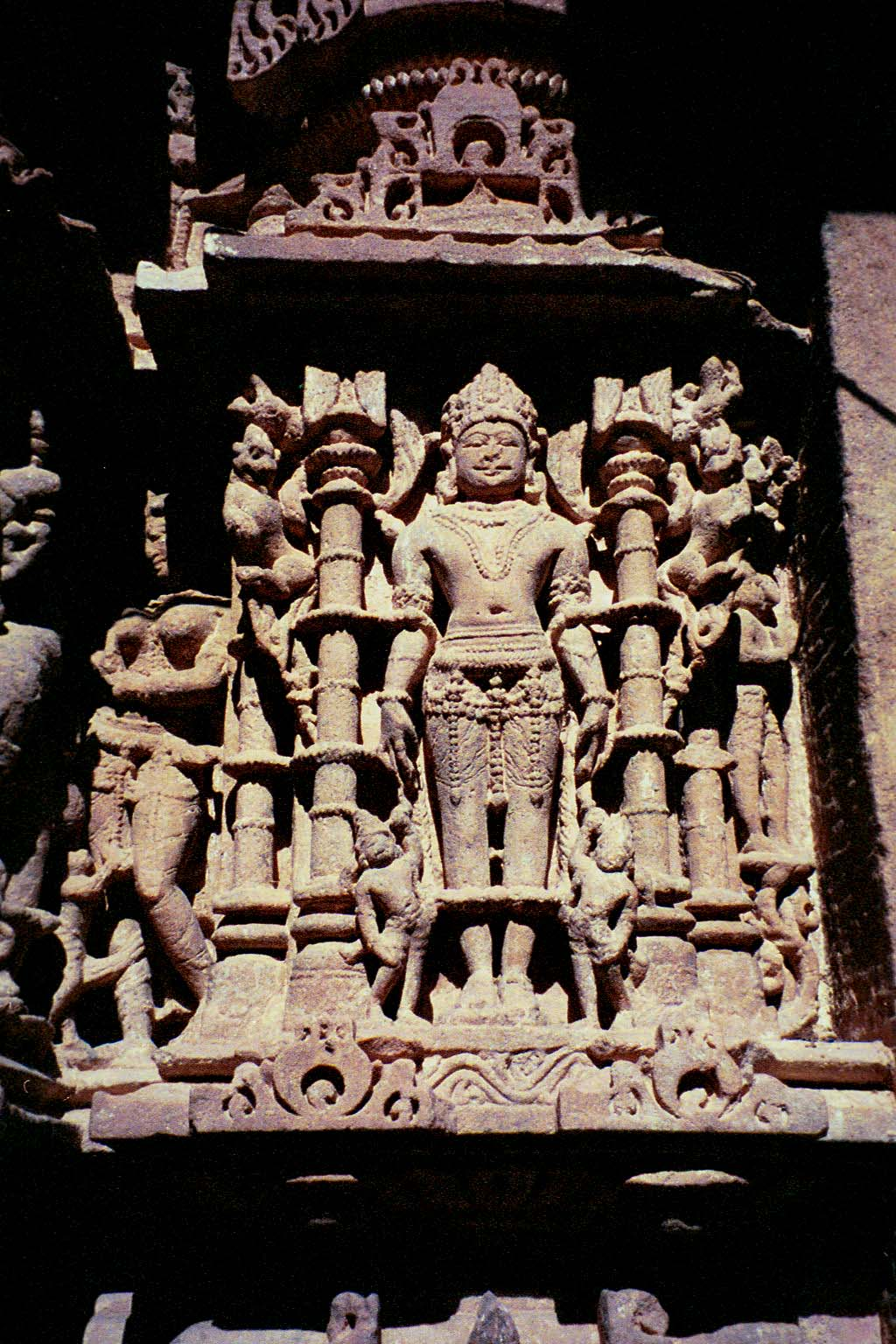
Jivantasvami image of a Tirthankara carved on Torana in Mahavira Jain temple, Osian

== Ancient sculptures ==
Gopachal rock-cut Jain monuments (14-15th CE) are images of Jain Tirthankaras carved in the Gopachal Hill, Gwalior in the state of Madhya Pradesh.

=== Bronzes ===
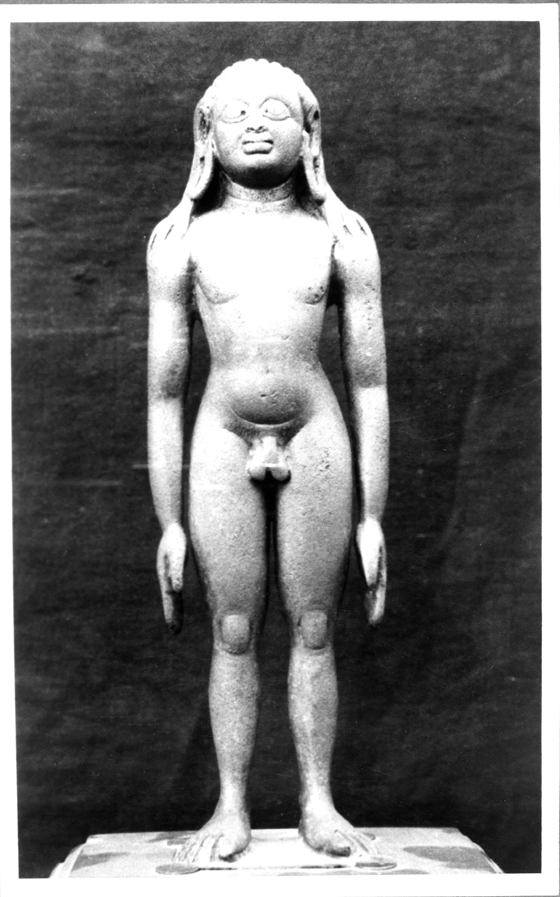
Rishabhadeva, Bronze from Chausa, Bihar

Various bronze idols of tirthankaras have been discovered in different states. Akota Bronzes and Vasantgarh hoard of Gujarat; Hansi hoard of Haryana, Chausa hoard and Aluara bronzes from Bihar.

=== In Tamil Nadu ===
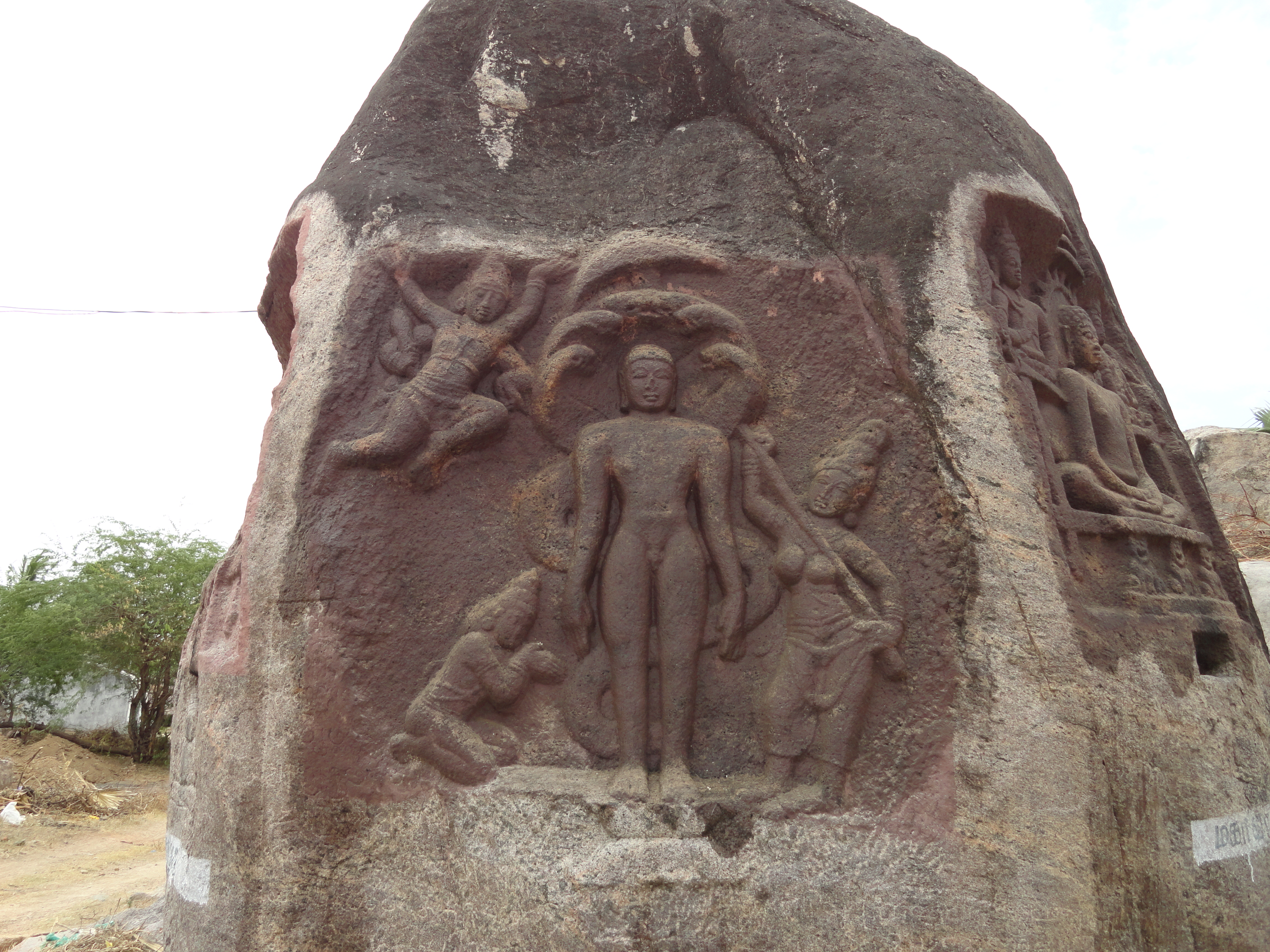
Sculpture depicting Tirthankara Parshvanatha, Thirakoil, Tamil Nadu

Jainism spread here and there all over Tamil Nadu during Sangam Age. One of the Tamil literature, called Paripadal (பரிபாடல்), probably belongs to 3rd century, mentions that there were propelling statues sculptured in stone for different deities in the temple of God Murugan in Thirupparankundram. One among them was Jain statue. Others are Kaaman-Rathi (the deities of Love), Deity Indra (the king of so-called Heavenly people according to Indian mythology), Agaligai (wife of Saint Gaudham), and Buddha.

Kalugumalai Jain Beds near Madurai belongs to one century latter is to be compared with Thirpparankunram Jain sculpture. In addition a propelling stone statue of a Jain monk mentioned in Tamil literature is also present. Cave inscriptions in Brahmi script of Chera kings in Pugalur probably one century earlier to that of the literature we have taken to our consideration, names some of the Jain Monks vs Yatrur Senkayapan, Pittan, Kotran. Pittan and Kotran are the chieftains of Tamil Nadu also mentioned in Tamil literature more or less to the same period.

== In museums ==
Lohanipur torso found in a central Division of Patna, ancient Pataliputra, dates back to 3rd century BCE. Some of the oldest Jain sculptures excaved at Kankali Tila are in the Government Museum, Mathura. Many Jain sculptures are kept in Government Museum, Chennai.

The oldest Jain sculpture in the Metropolitan Museum of Art in New York is of the Siddha Bahubali.

== Jain vs Buddhist iconography ==
A Buddhist image can be in one of several mudras. However the Jain tirthankara images can only be in one of the two format. In Padmasana, the statues of a Jina and a Buddha can be similar. The Buddha statue has folds of the cloth on the upperbody, with cloth behind the left arm, where as the Jina statue is without clothes, unless it is a Shwetambara image which shows "kandora" folds.

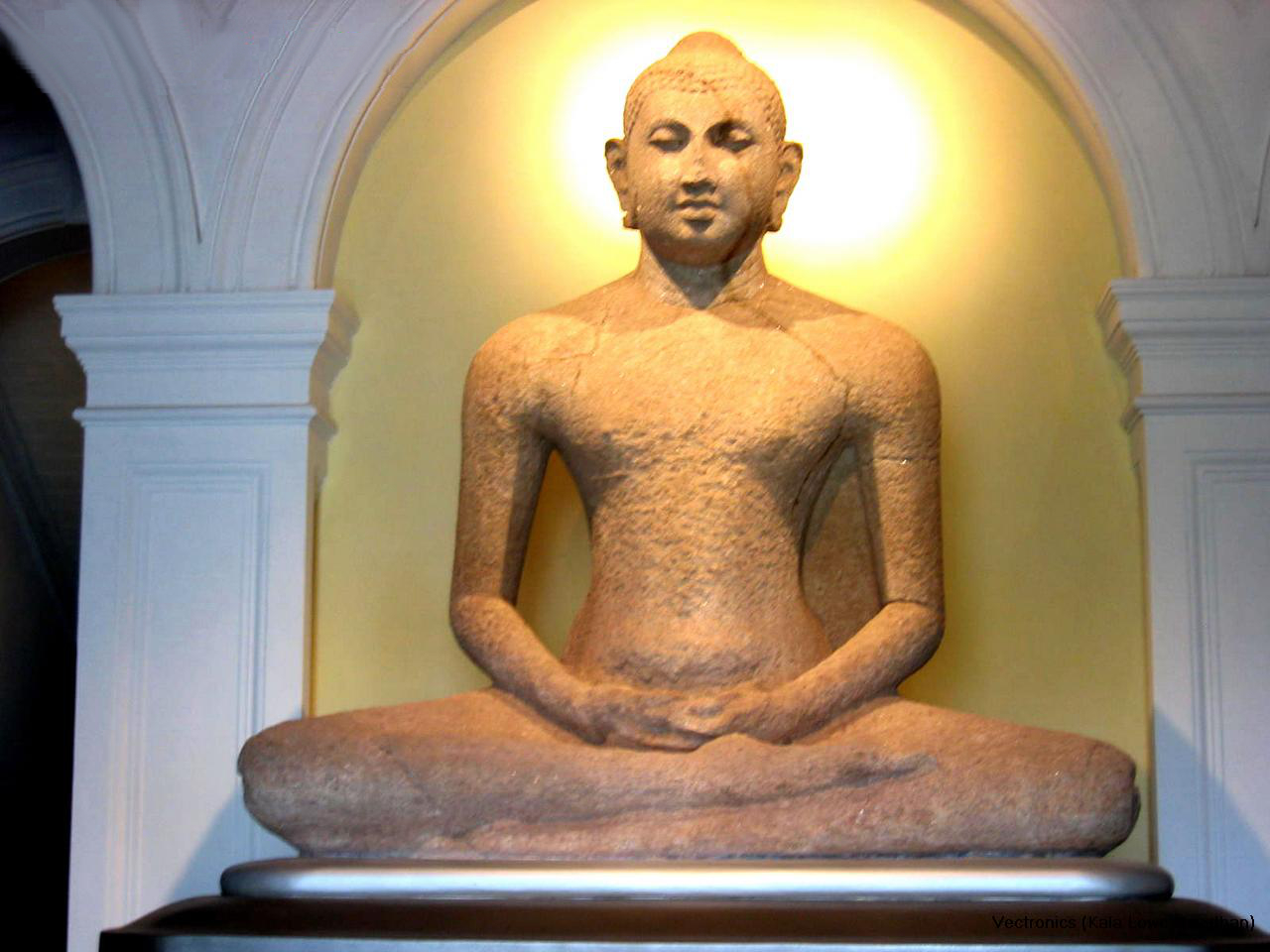
Toluvila statue Buddha from Anuradhapura, 5th Century CE, Colombo

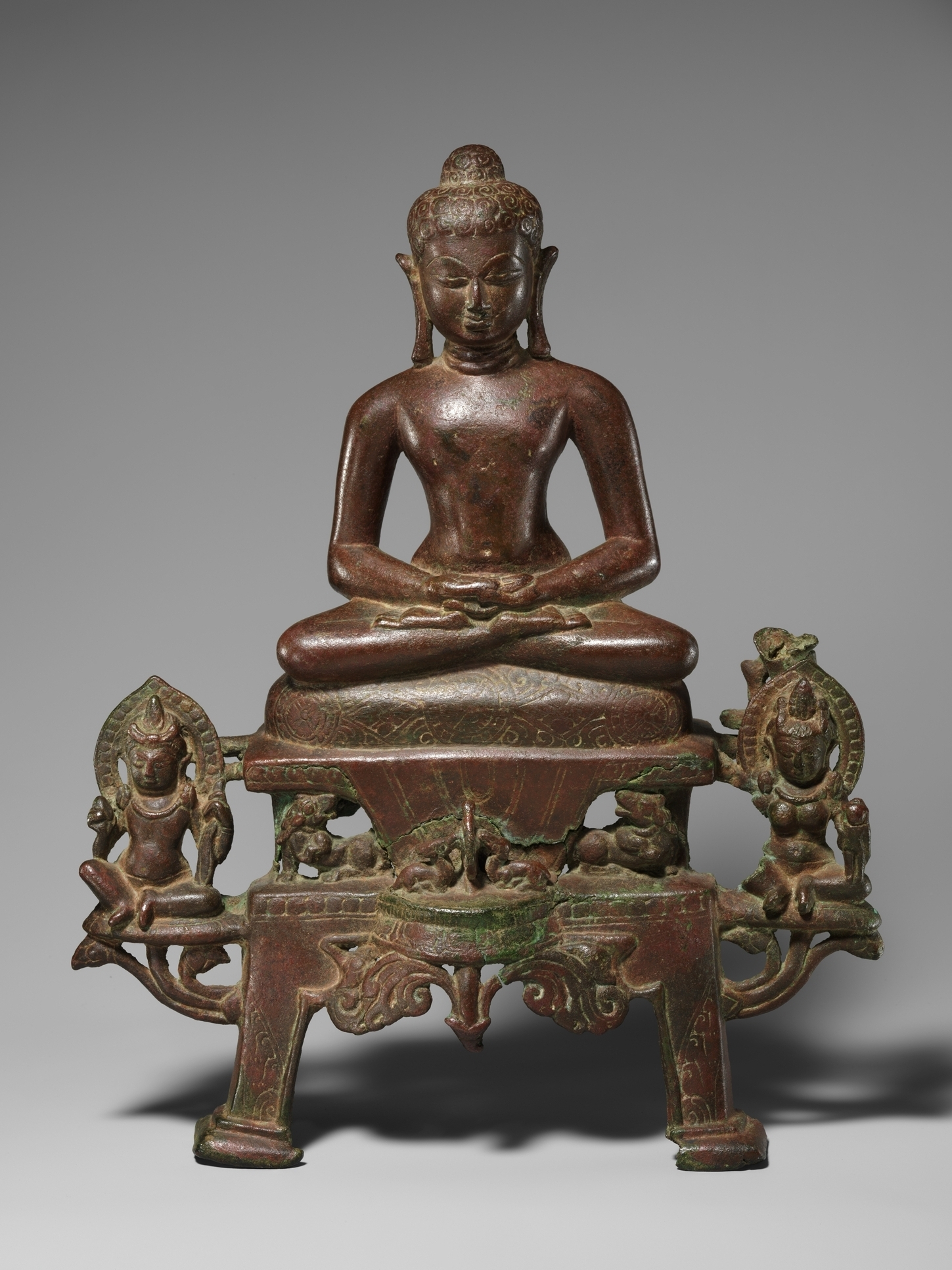
Lord Neminatha (Akota Bronzes 7th century)

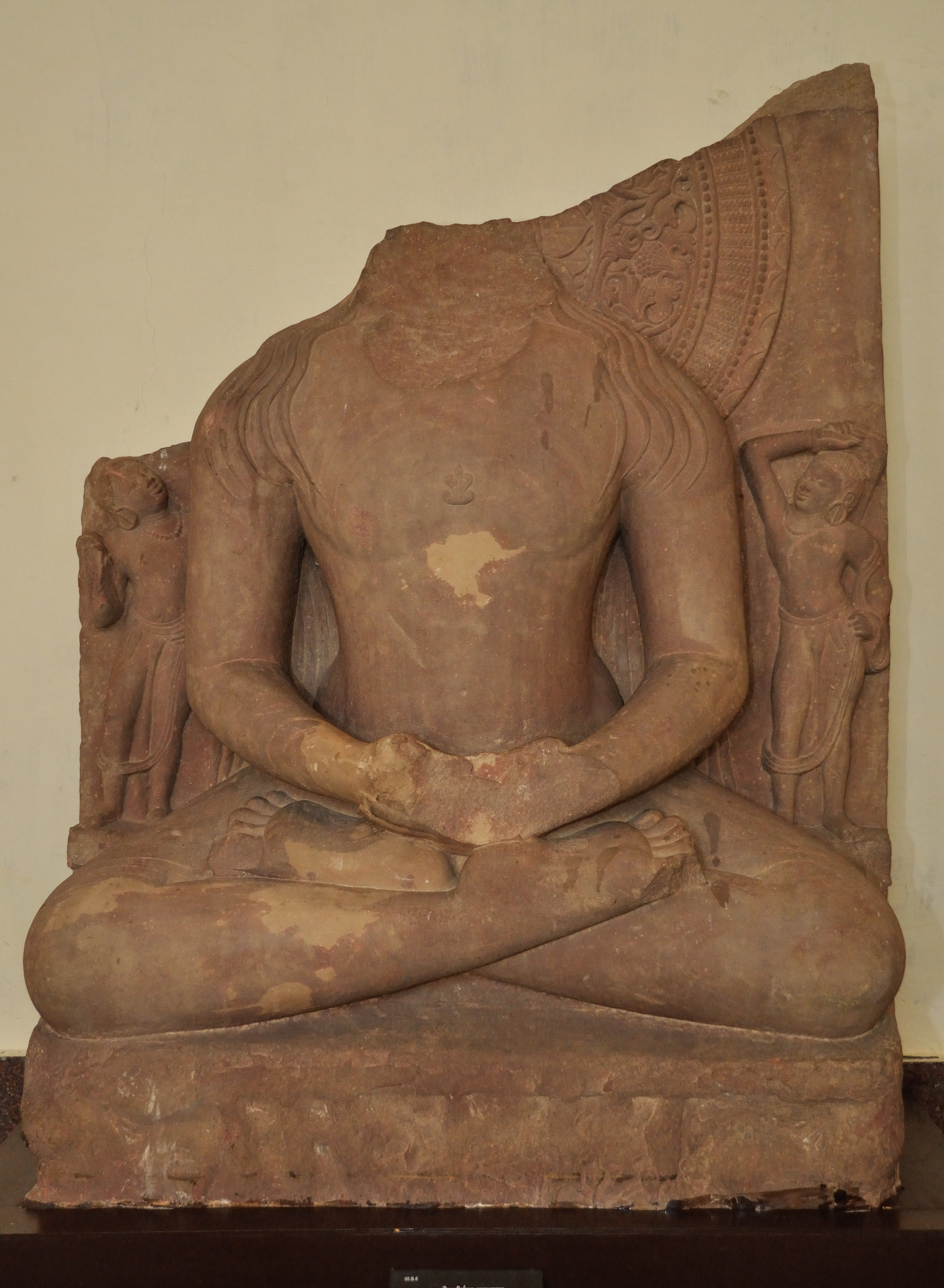
Rishabhanatha 5th Century CE, from Kankali Tila

== Chronological Gallery: Kayotsarga Statues ==
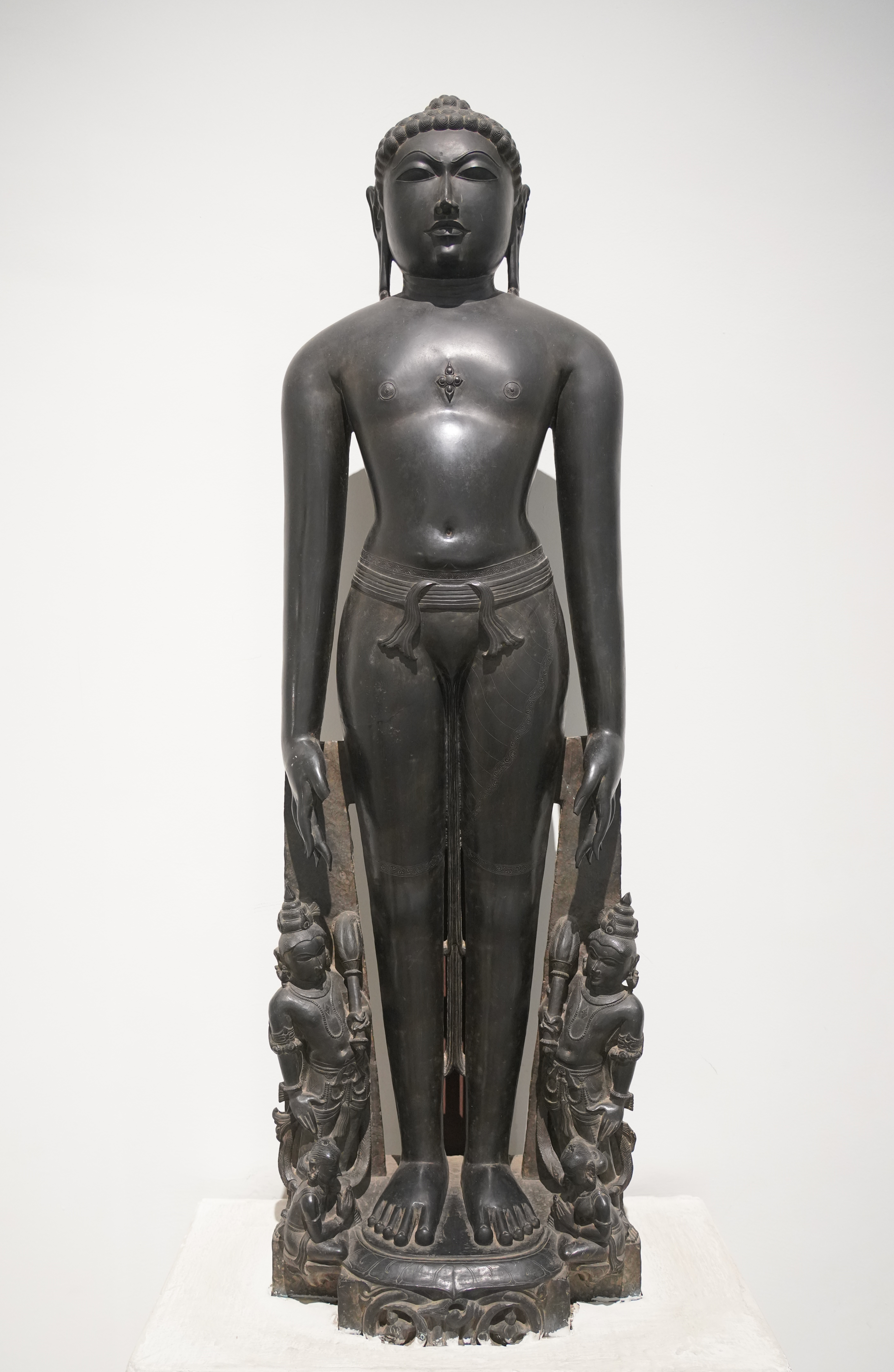
Tirthankara Neminatha Sculpture, National Museum, New Delhi, 11th Century

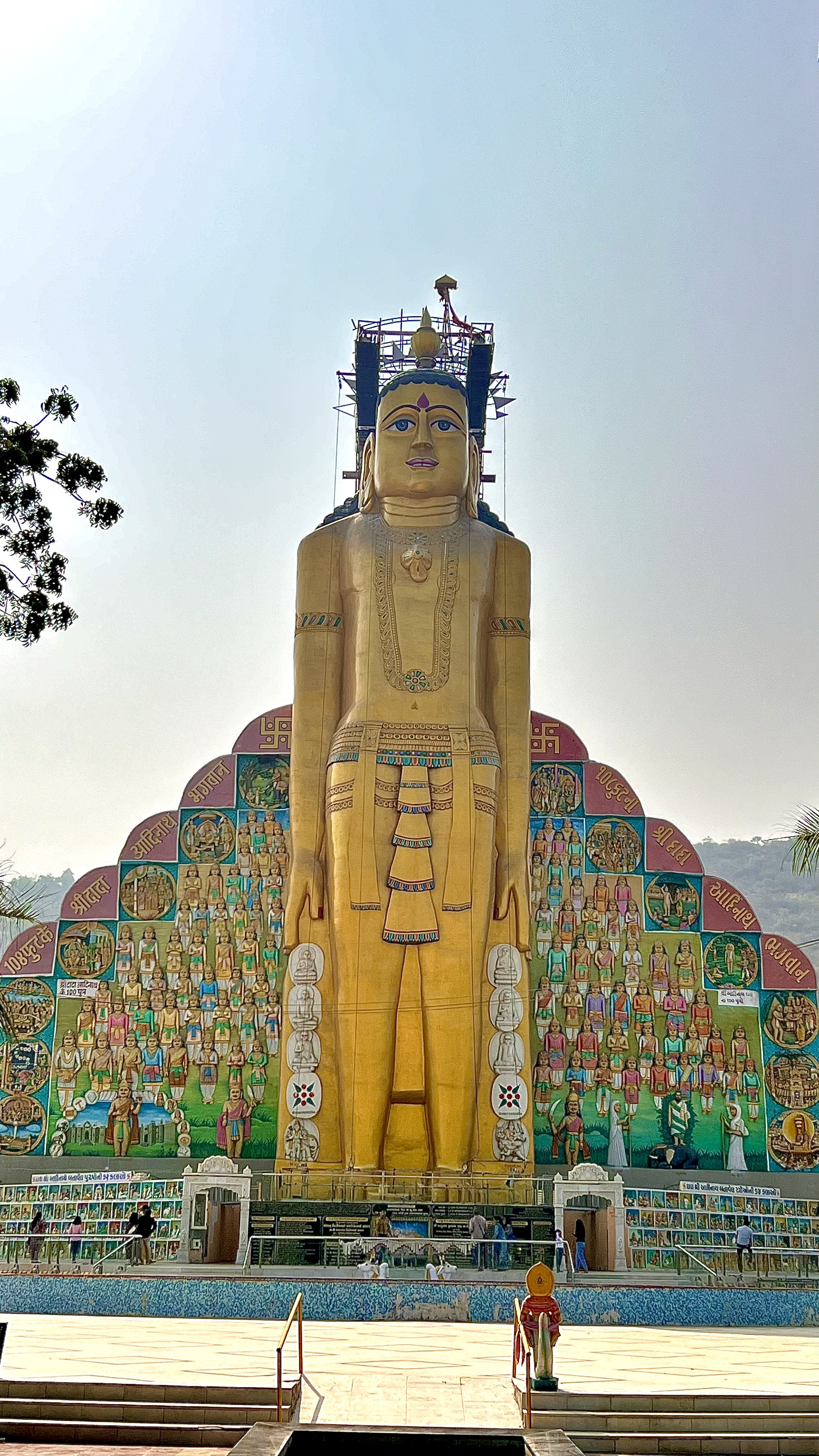
108 feet (33 m) statue of Tirthankara Rishabhnatha at Palitana

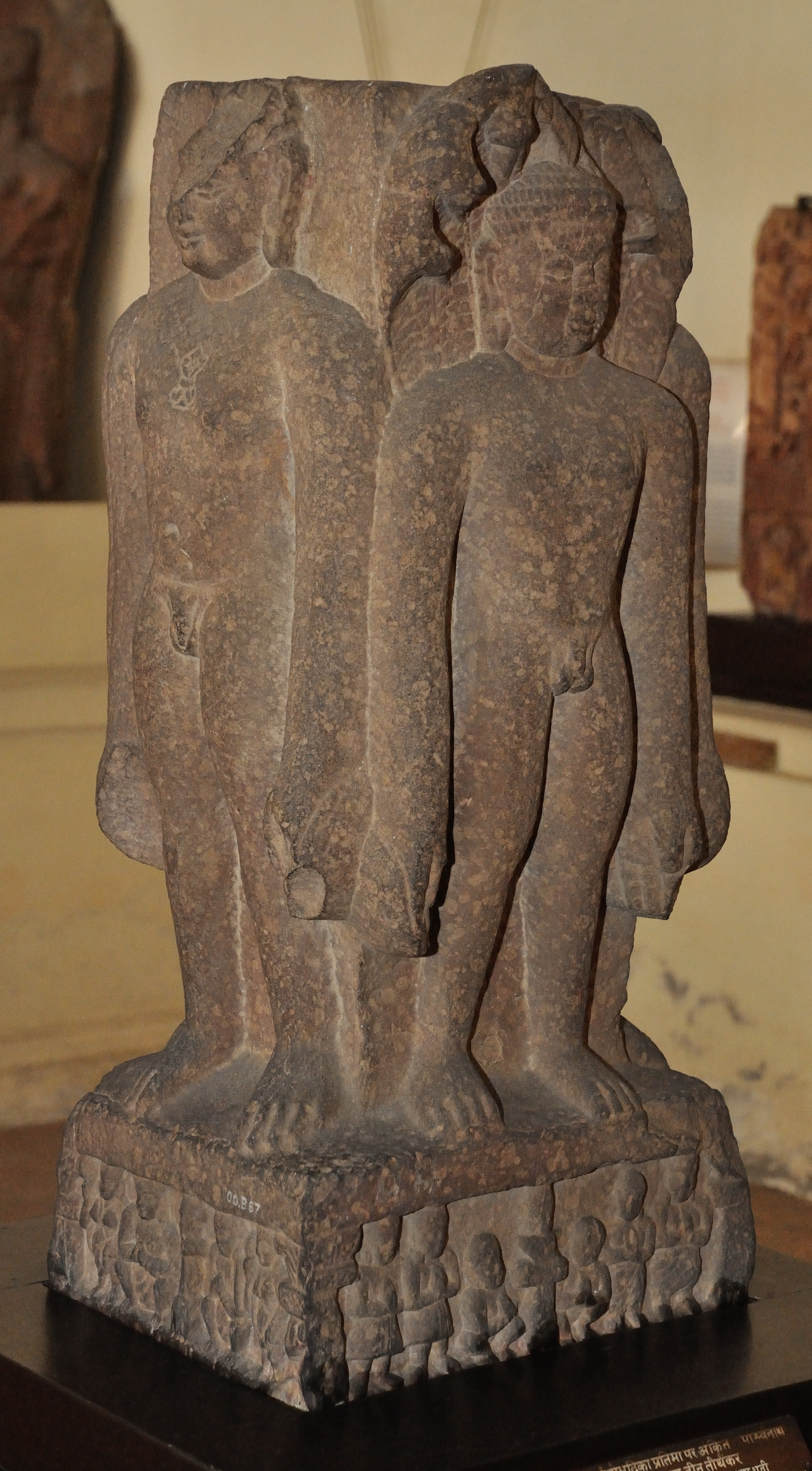
Four Fold Jain Image 1st Century Kankali Tila Mathura

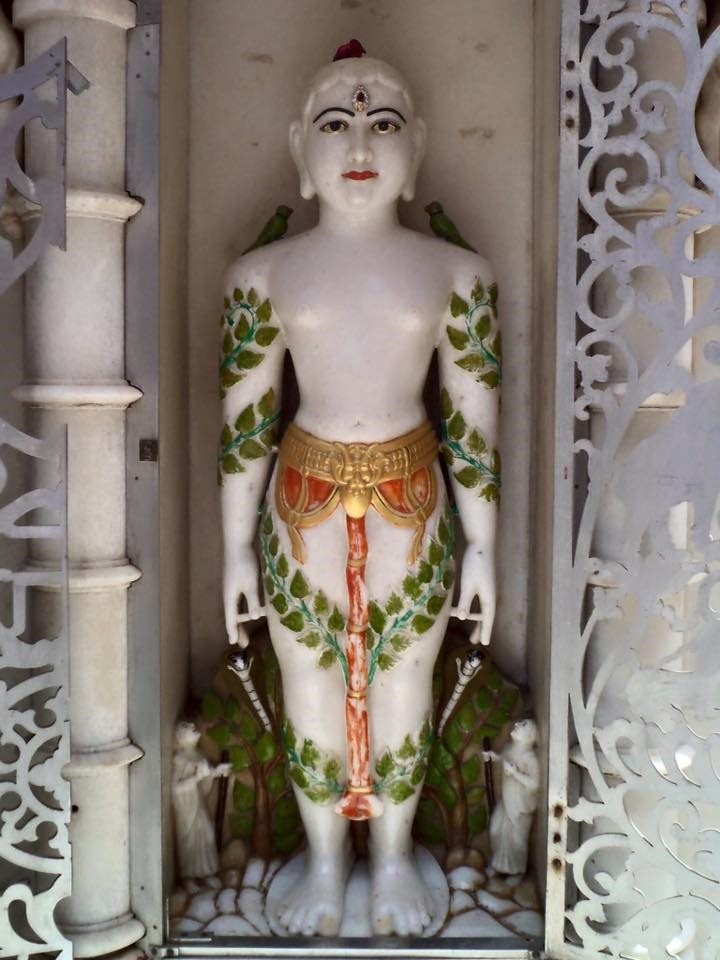
Idol of Bahubali at Shree Pragat Prabhavi Parshwanatha Jinalaya, Dabhoi, Gujarat

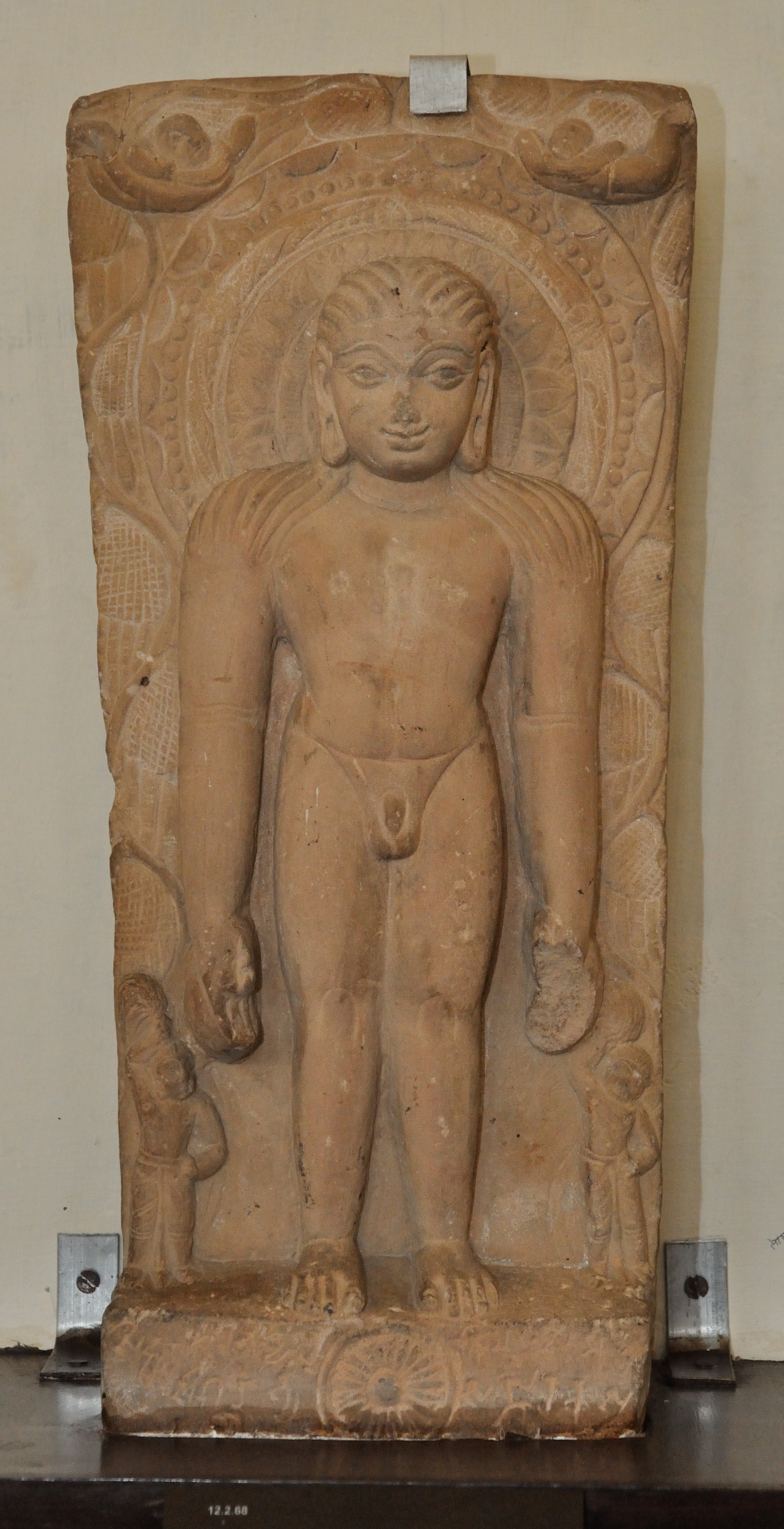
Rishabhanatha, Mathura Museum, 6th century

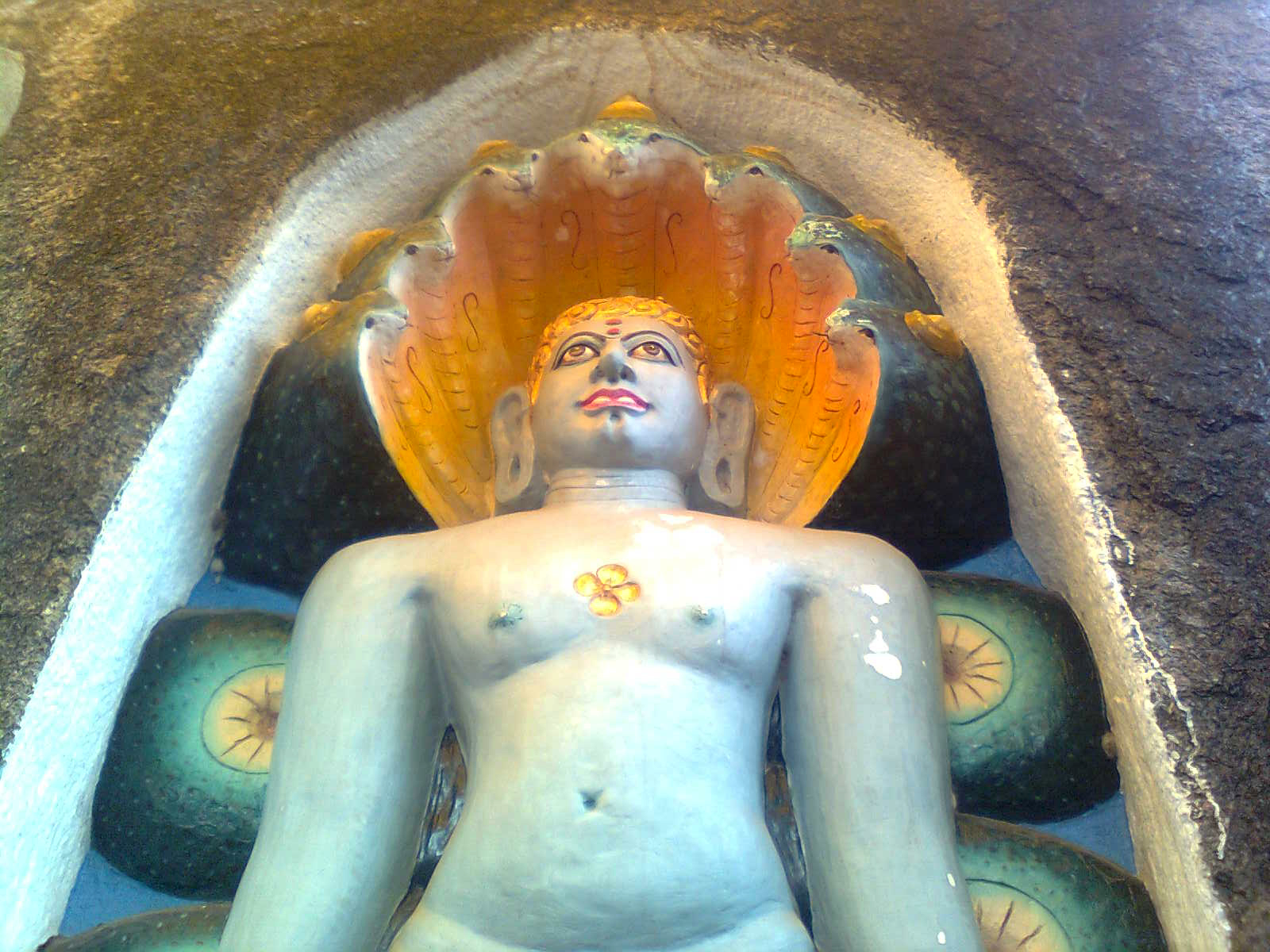
Converted image of Parshvanatha

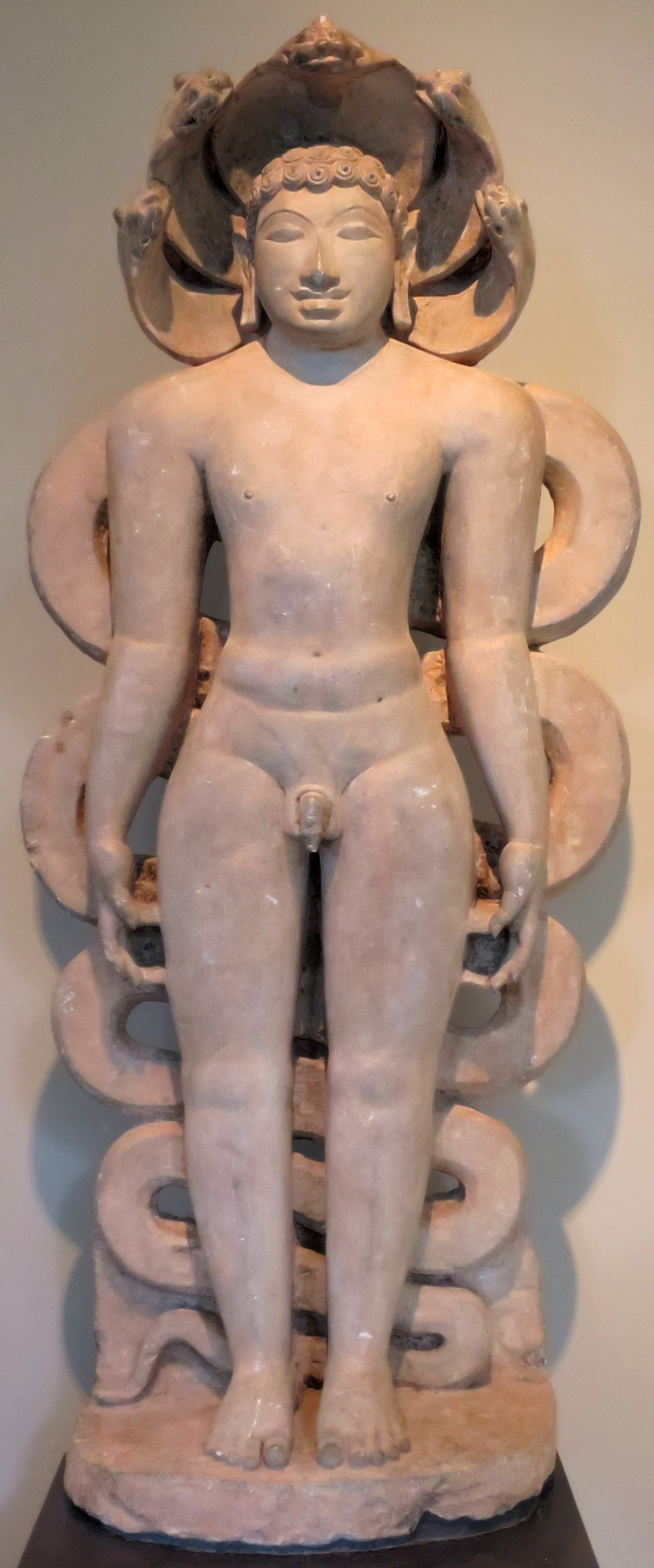
Suparsvanatha, Norton Simon Museum, c. 900 CE

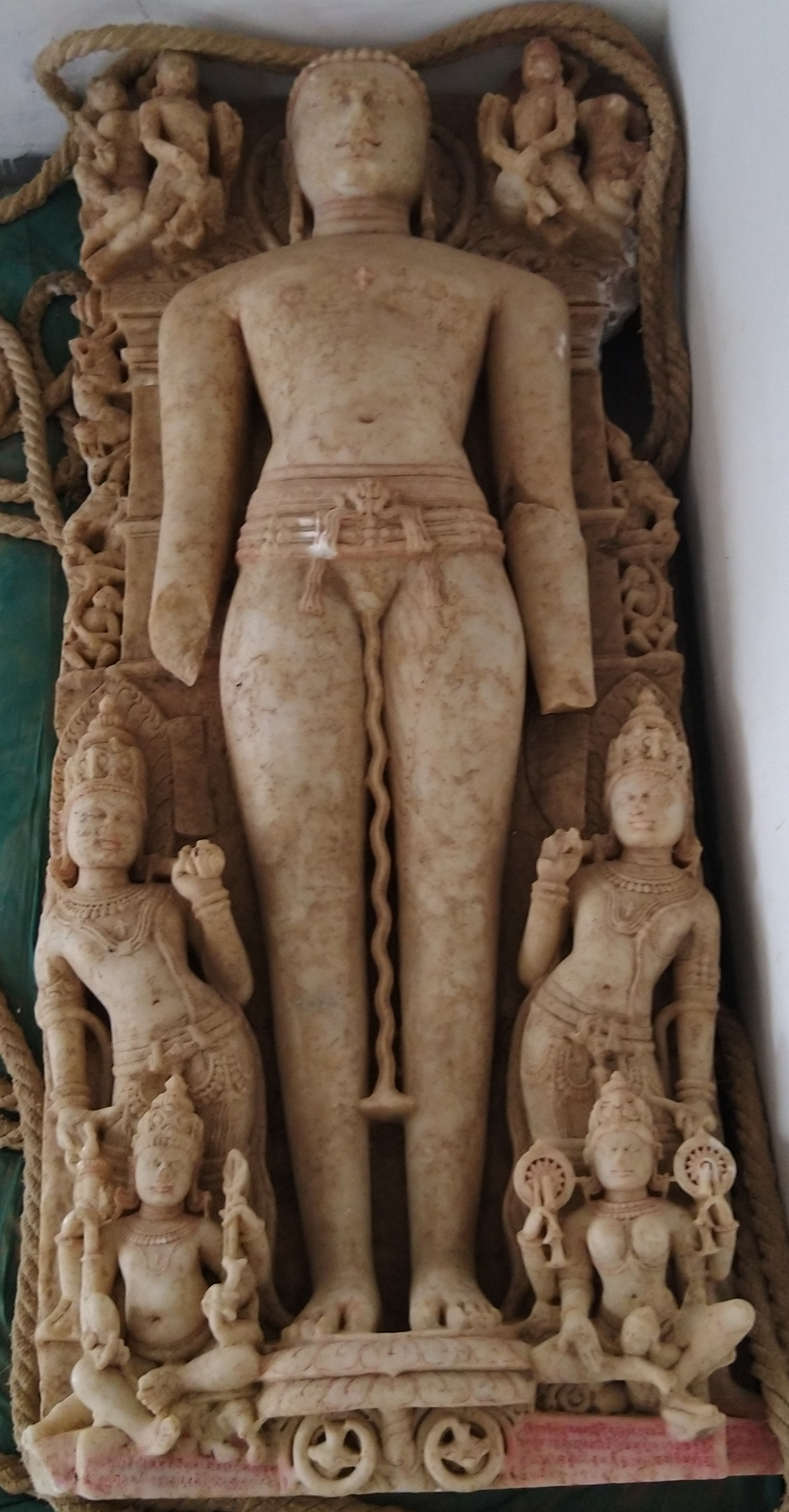
11th century Tirthankara statue in kayotsarg Mudra found during the excavation at Gambhu

== Chronological Gallery: Padmasana Statues ==
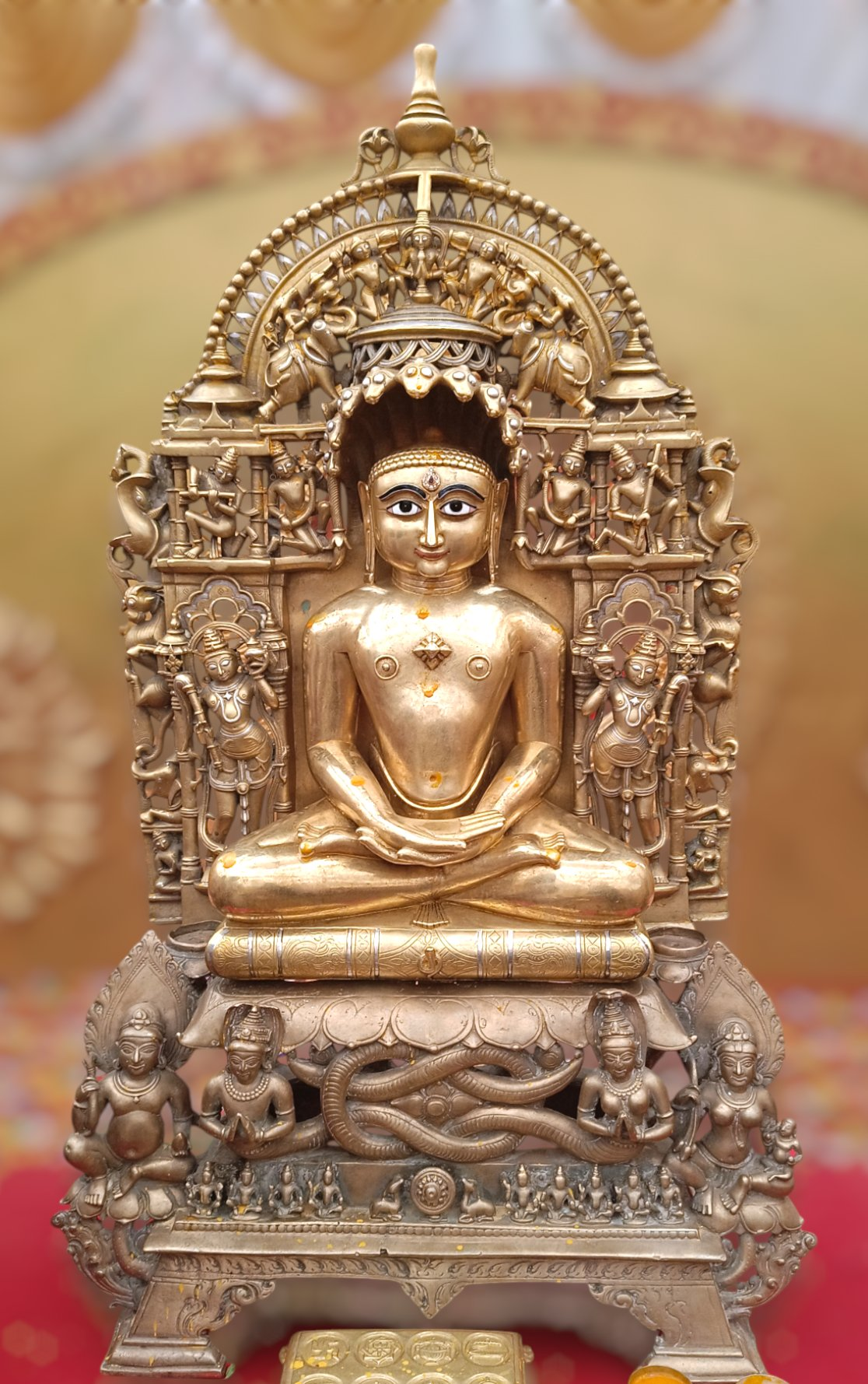
A 10th century CE idol of Parshvanatha from Patan, Gujarat

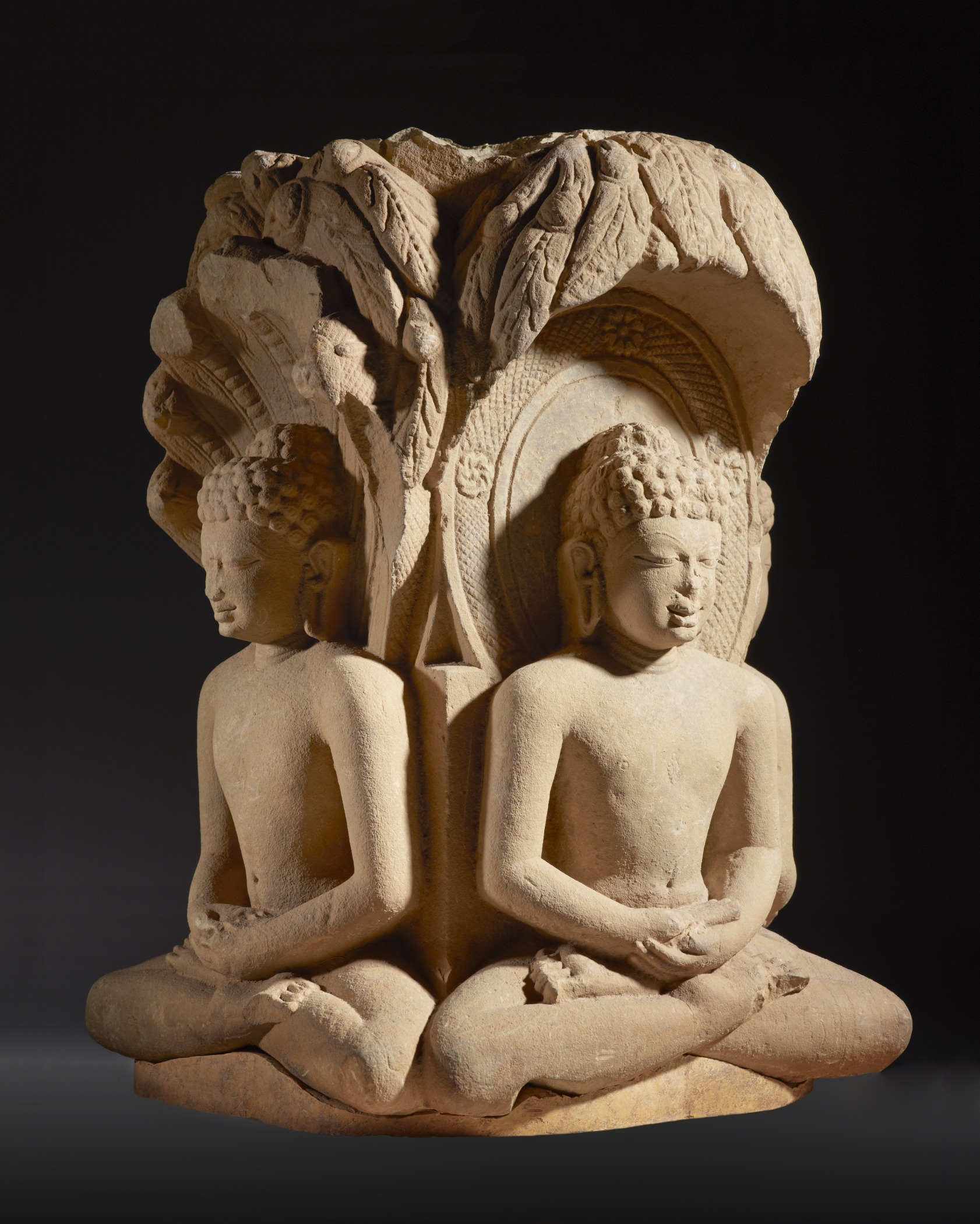
Rishabhanatha, Parshvanatha, Neminatha, and Mahavira, LACMA, Uttar Pradesh, circa 600

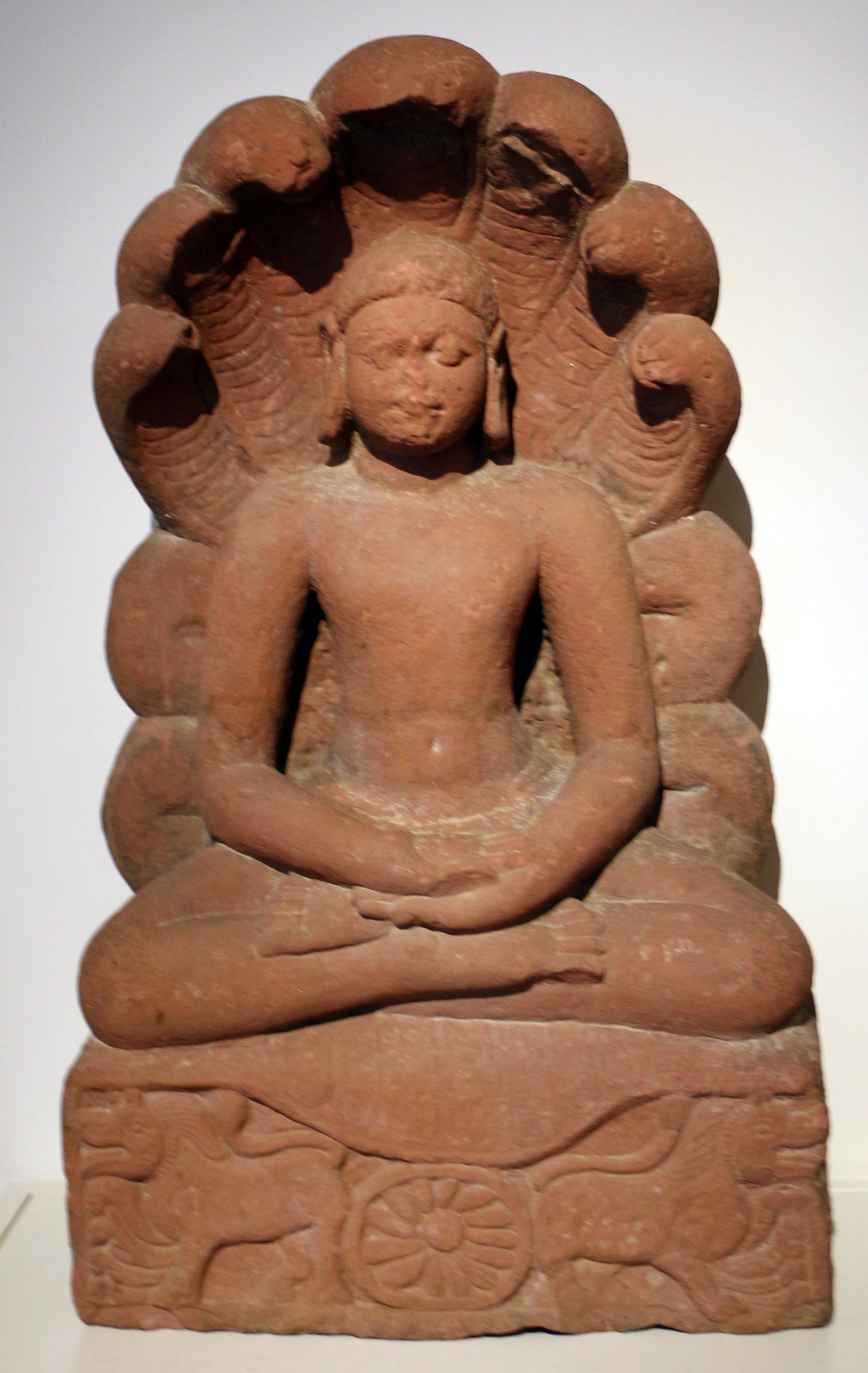
Parshvanatha, Art Institute of Chicago, 6th century

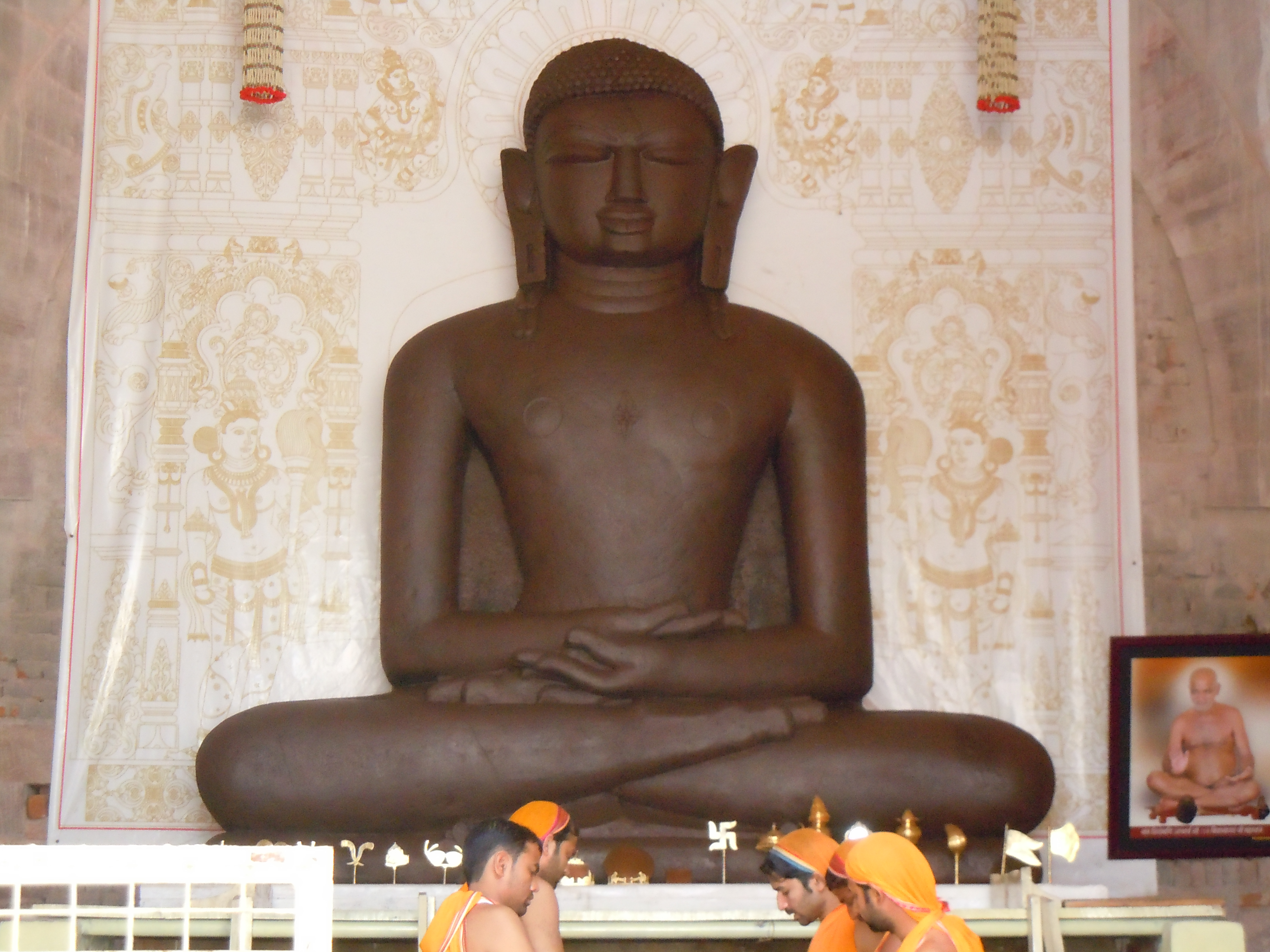
Image of Bade Baba (Rishabhanatha) at Kundalpur

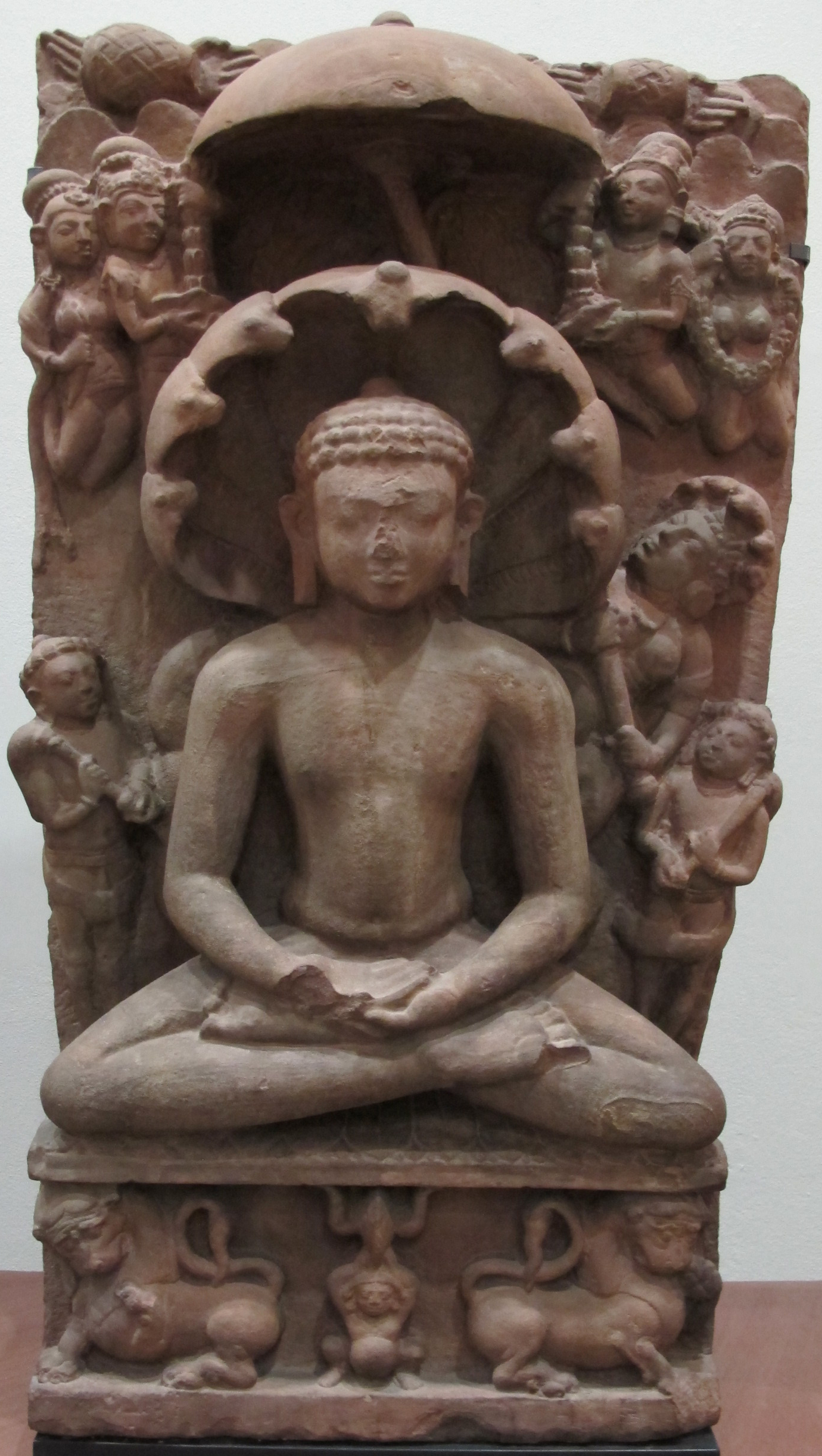
Parshvanatha, 600-700

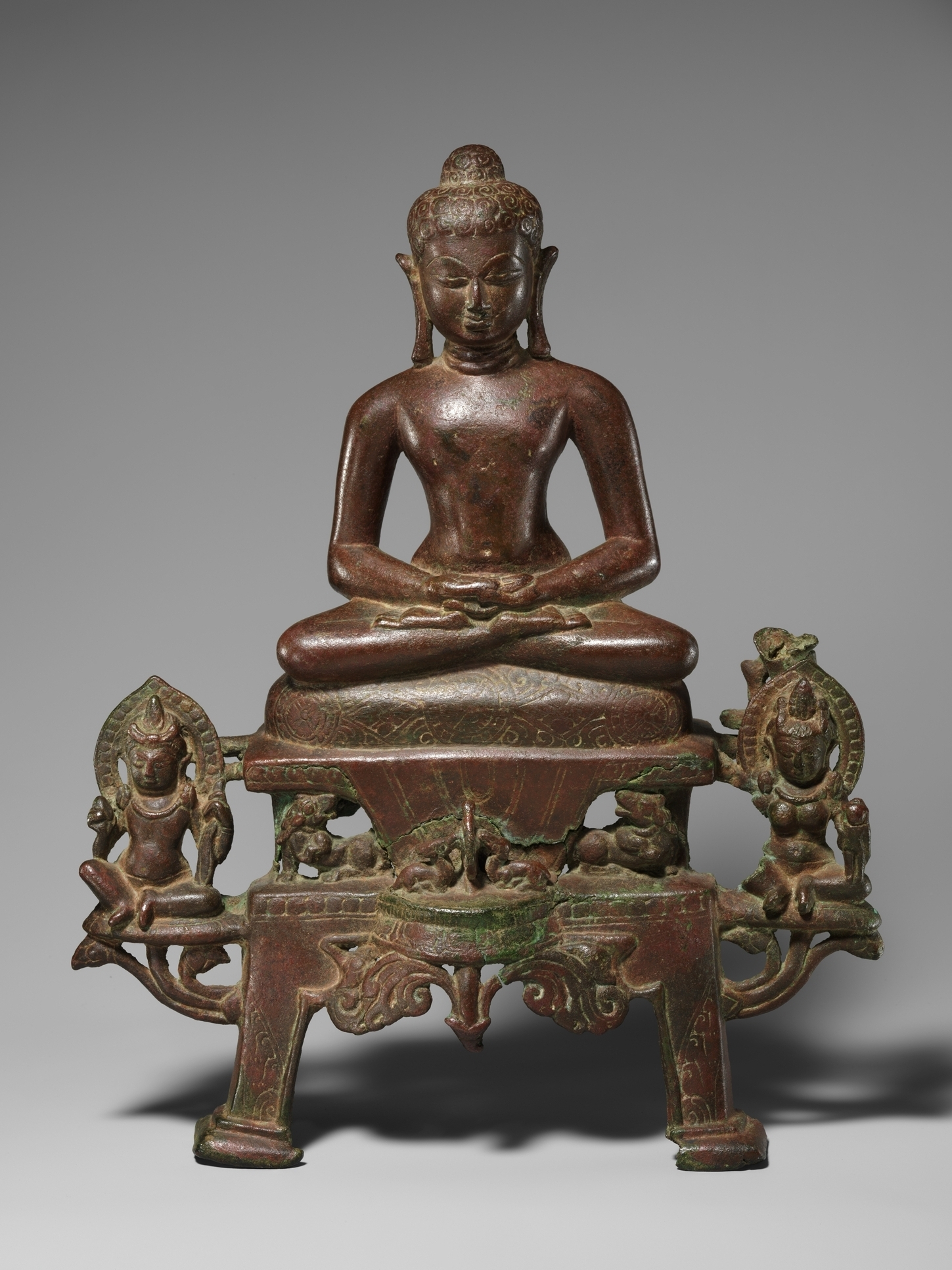
Neminatha, 7th C, Akota Bronzes

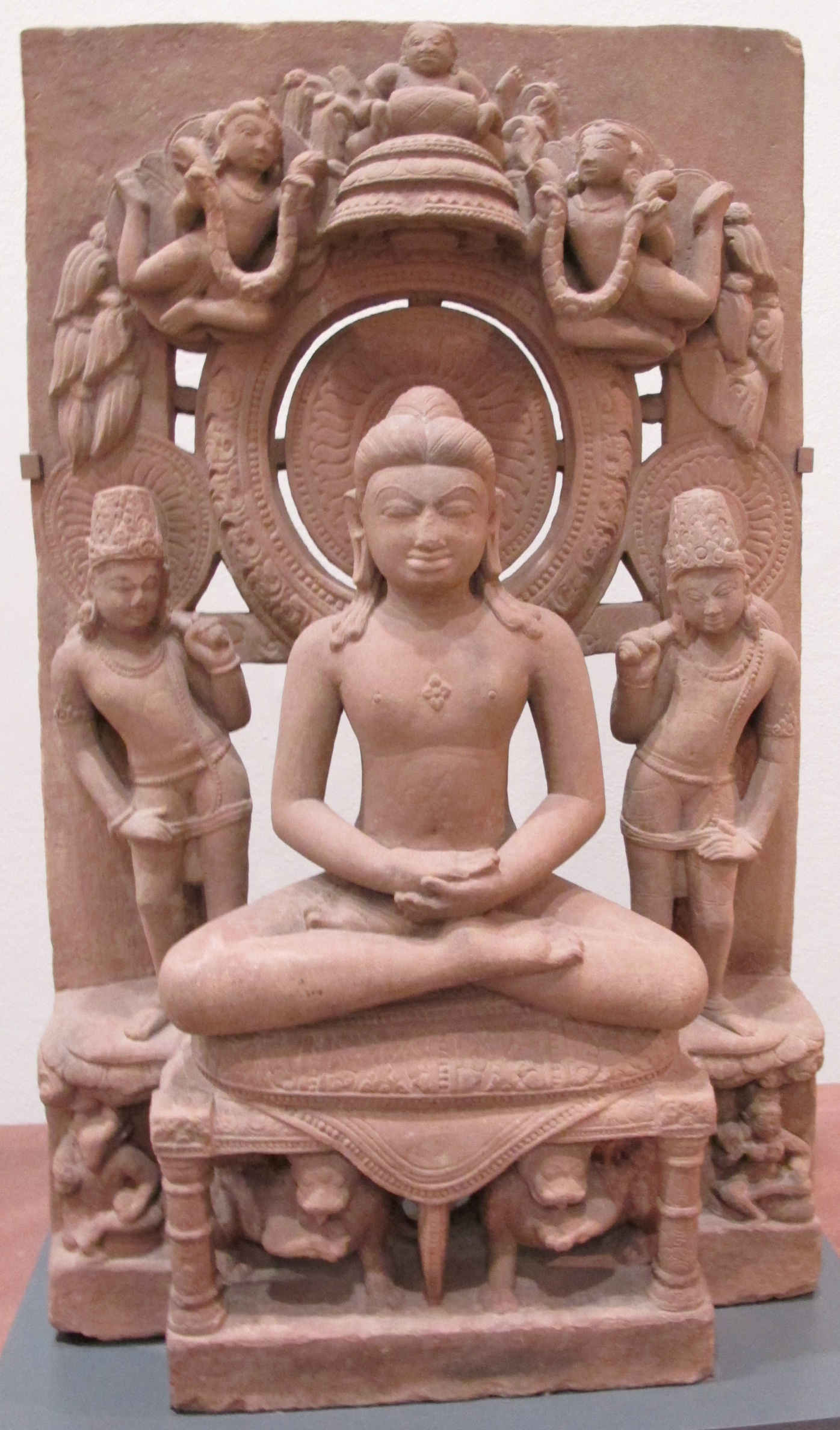
Rishabhanatha, 800-900

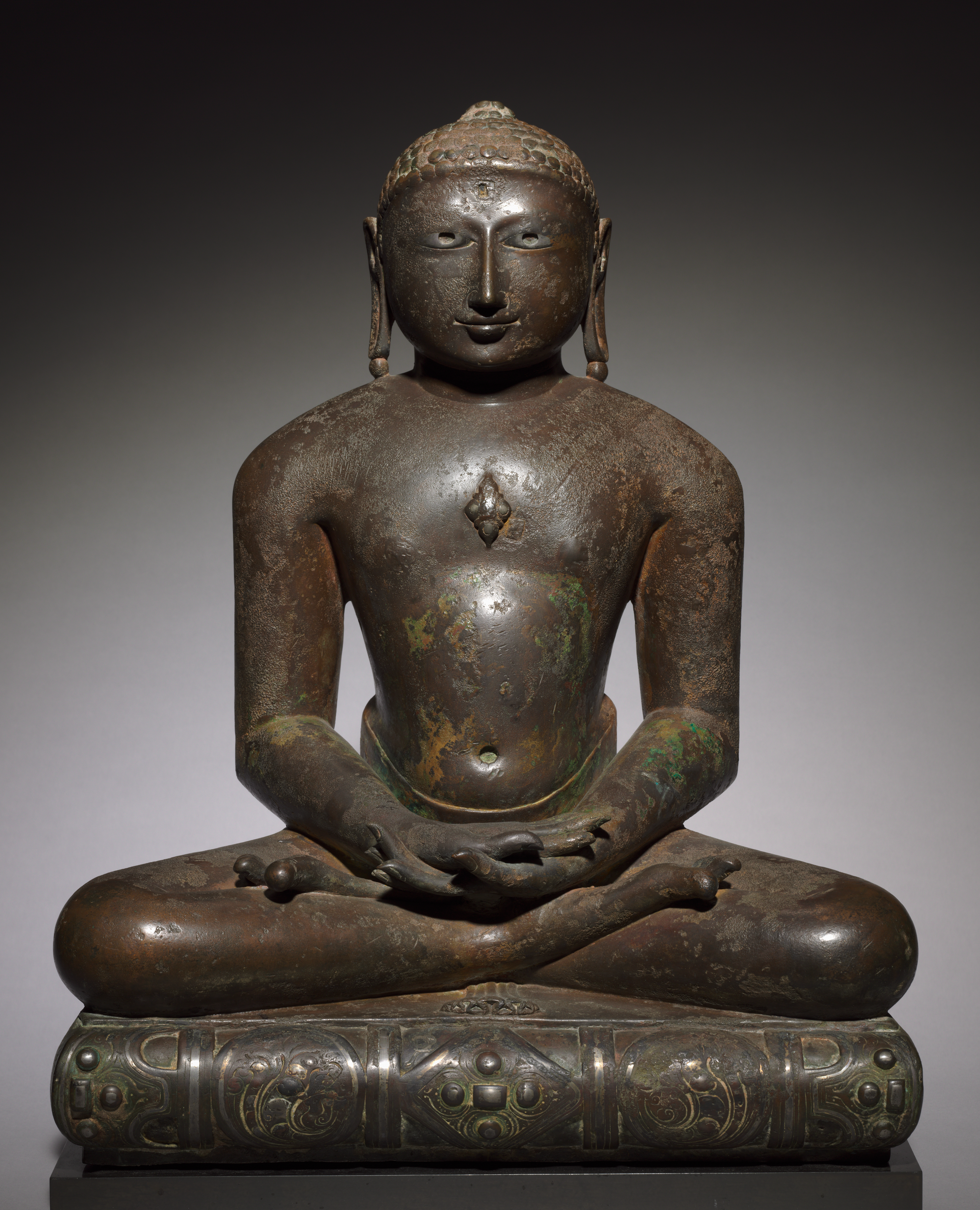
Jain tirthankara, Cleveland Museum of Art, 10th century

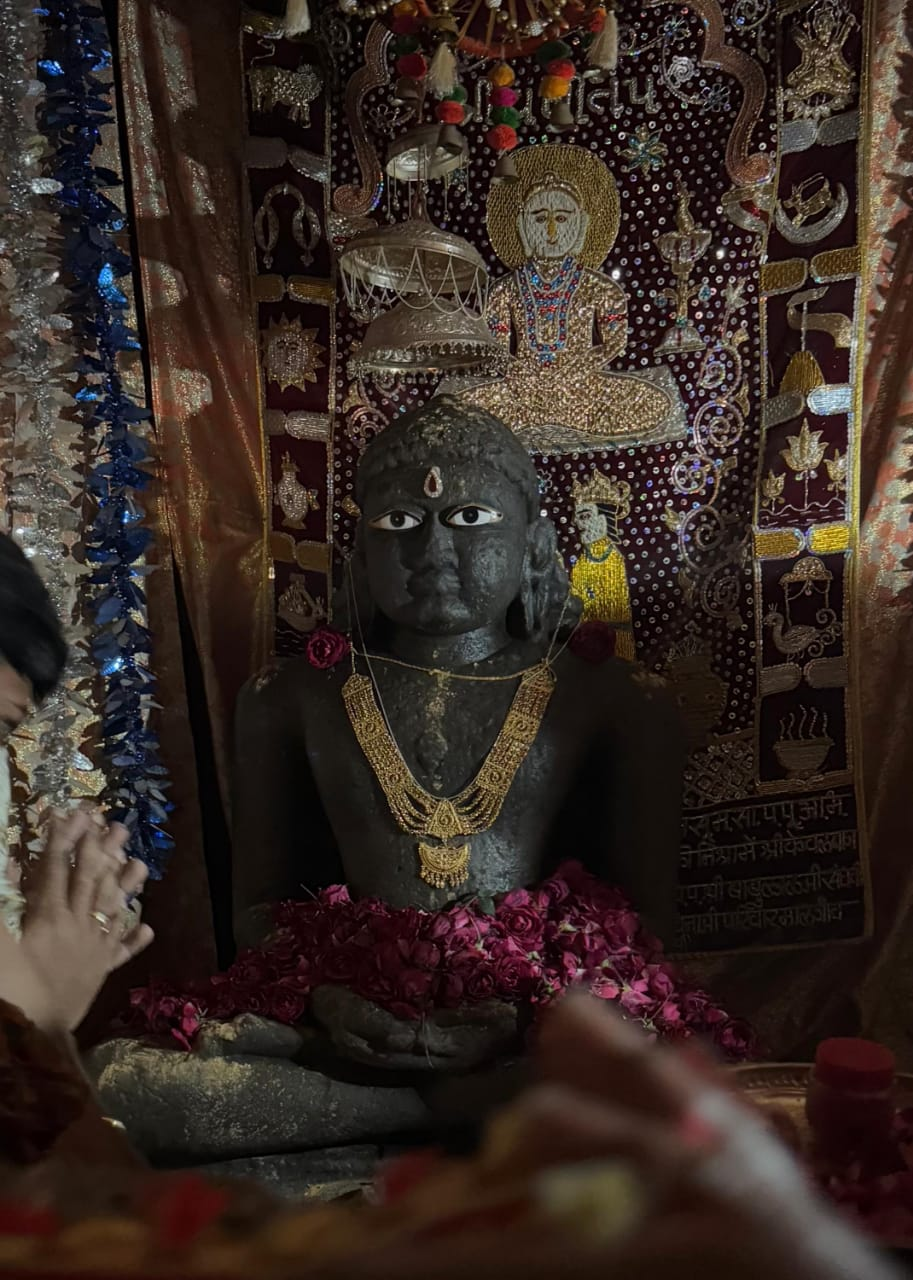
Idol of Rishabhanatha Decorated with Flowers & Ornaments as per Śvetāmbara Rituals at Kangra Śvetāmbara Jain Tirth

== Deities Gallery ==
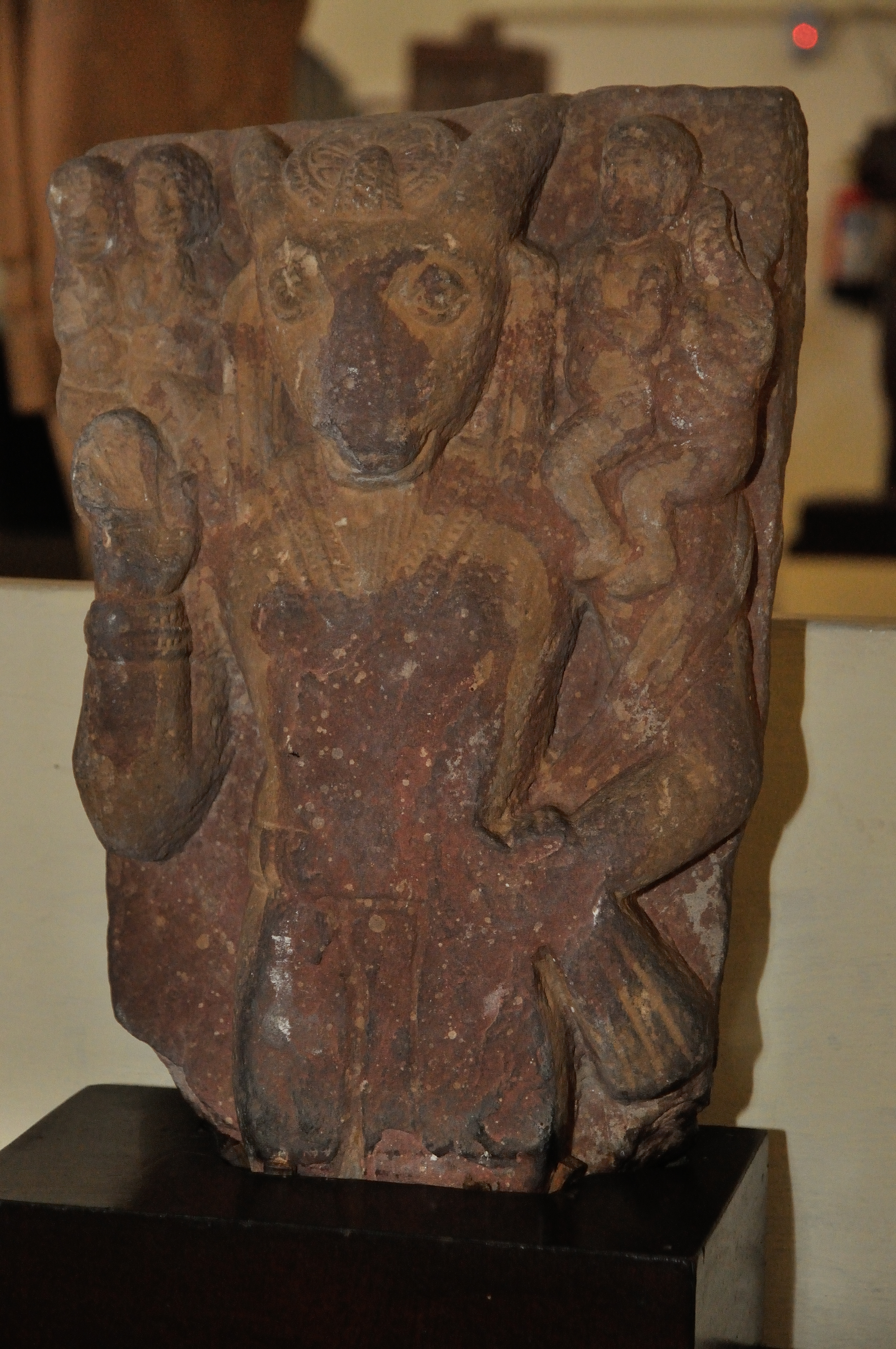
Naigamesha, Mathura Museum, 1st-3rd century CE

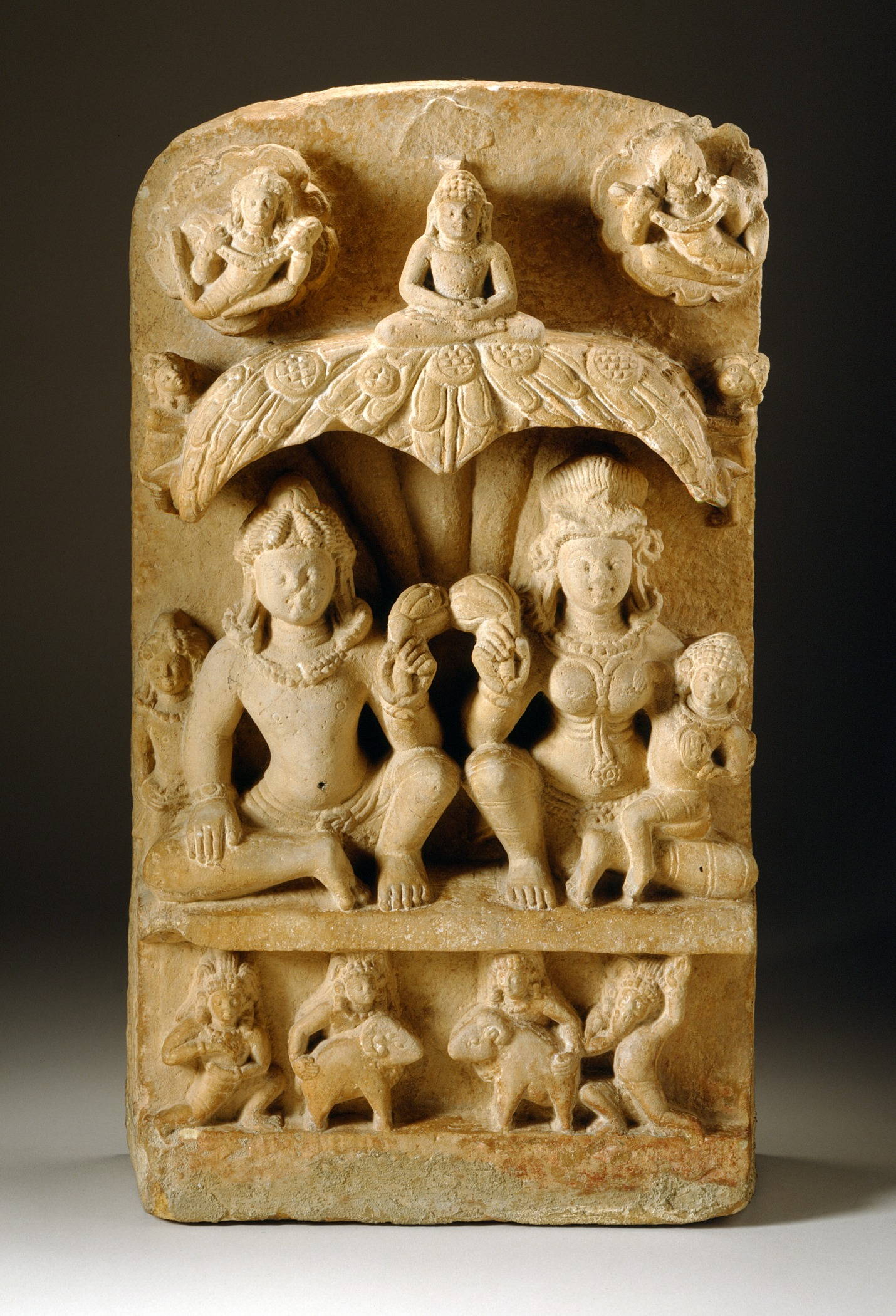
Jain Family Group, 6th century

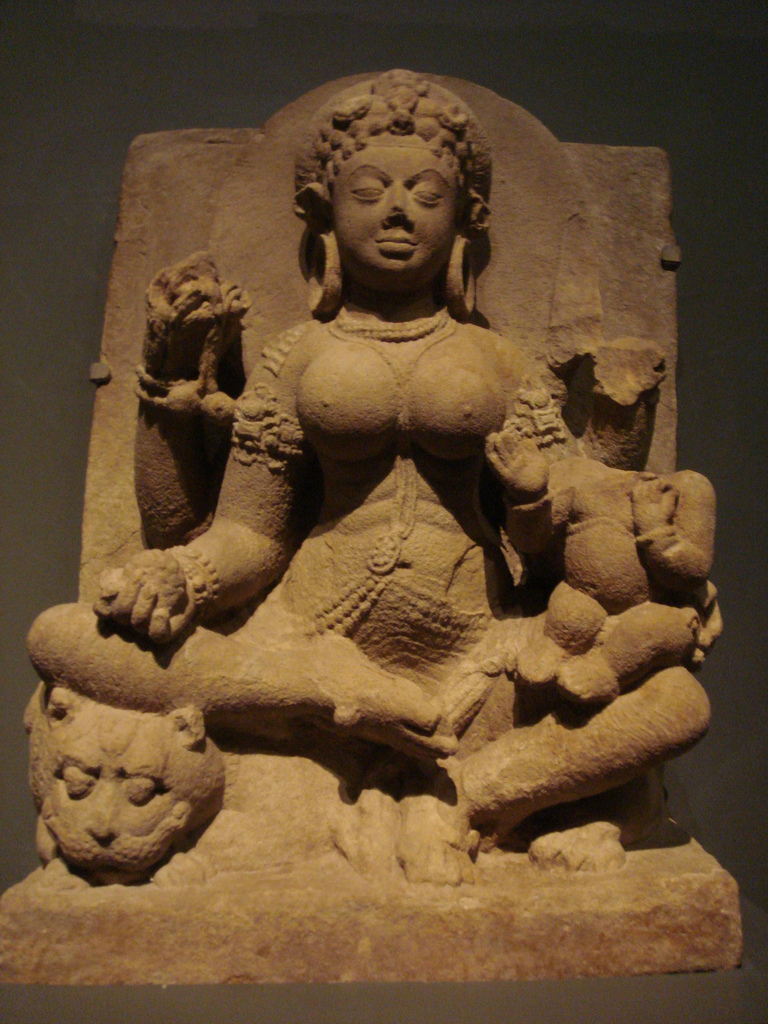
Ambika, 6th century

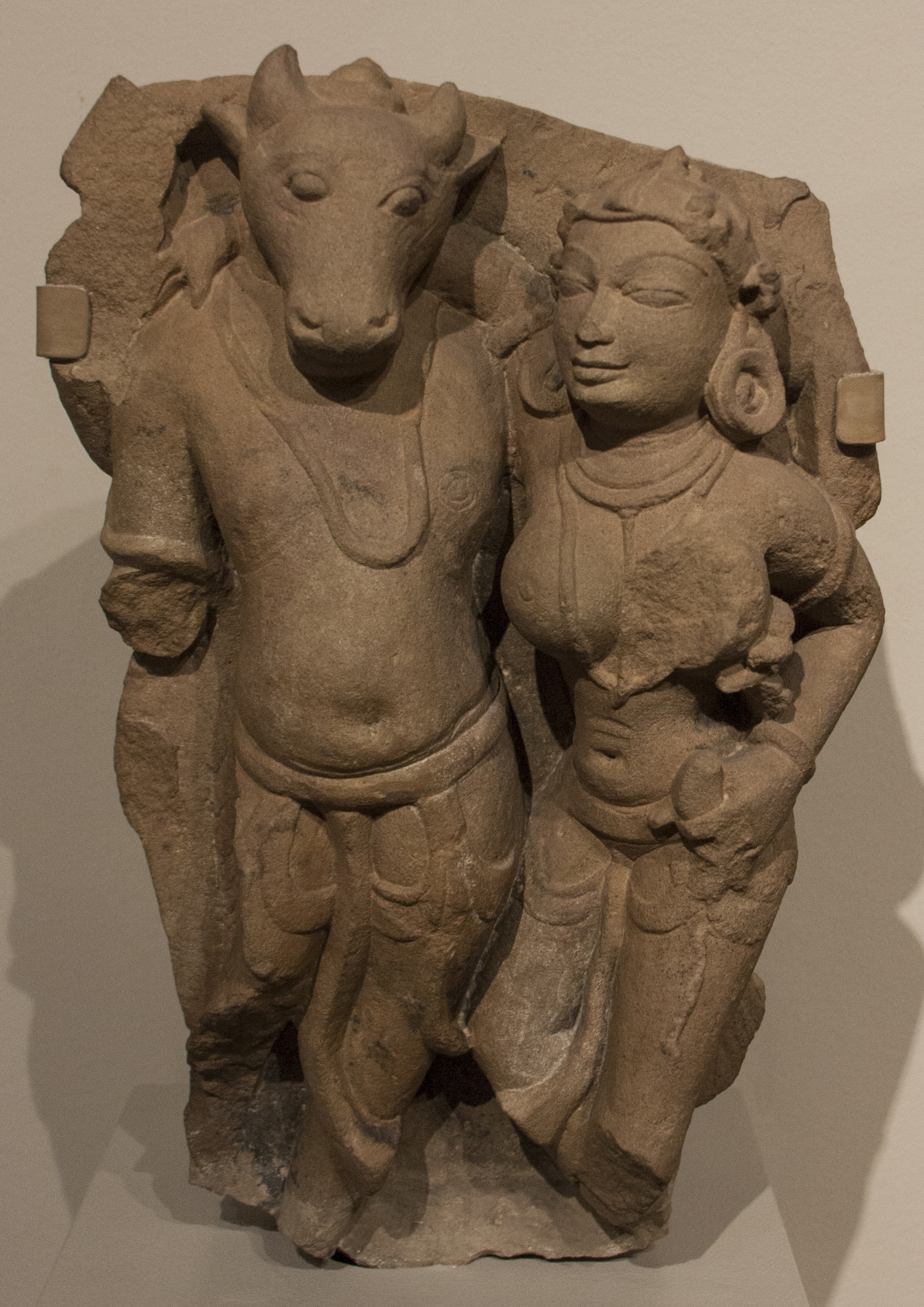
Gomukha, c. 8th century

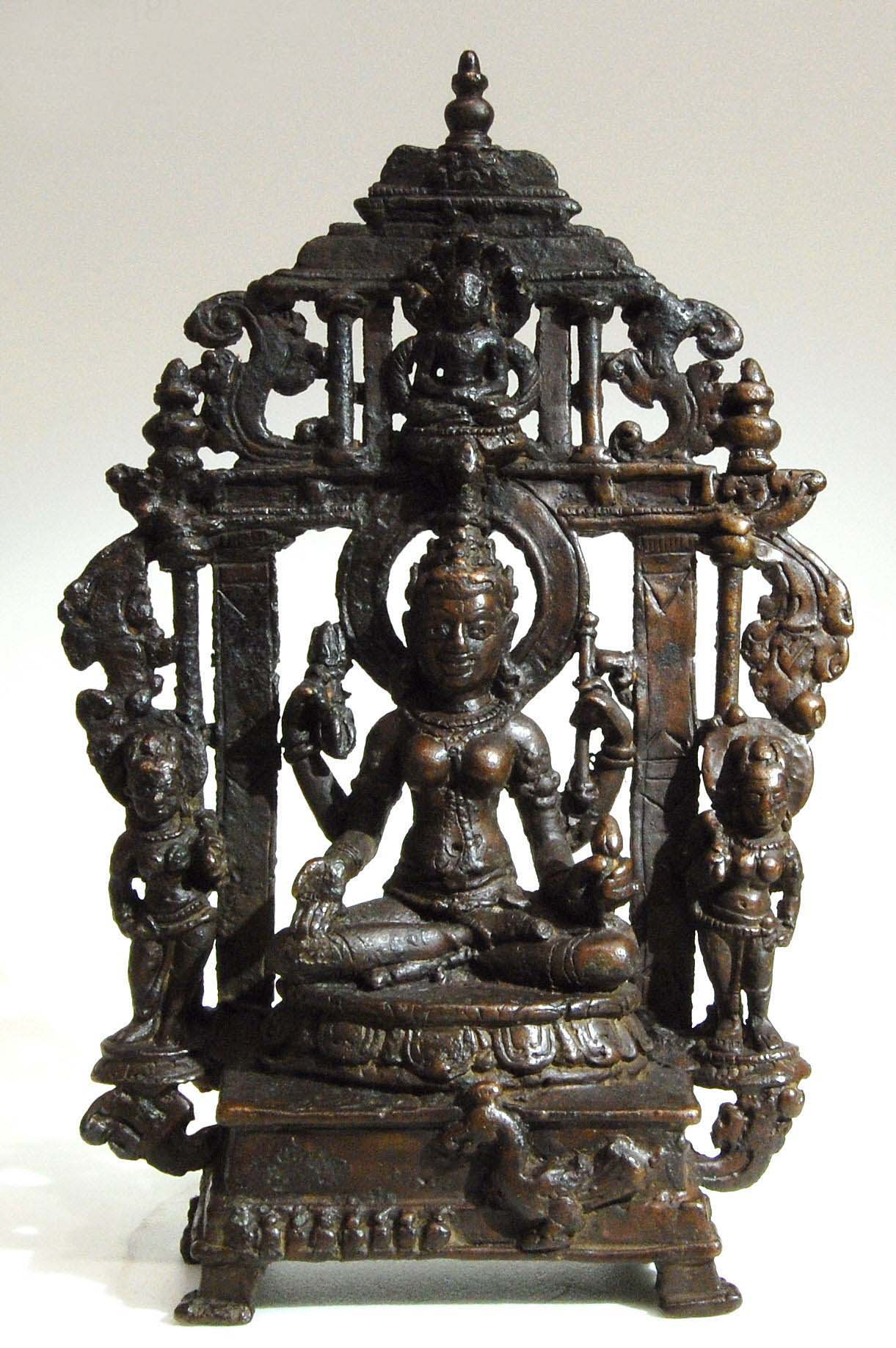
Padmavati, 10th century, Metropolitan Museum of Art

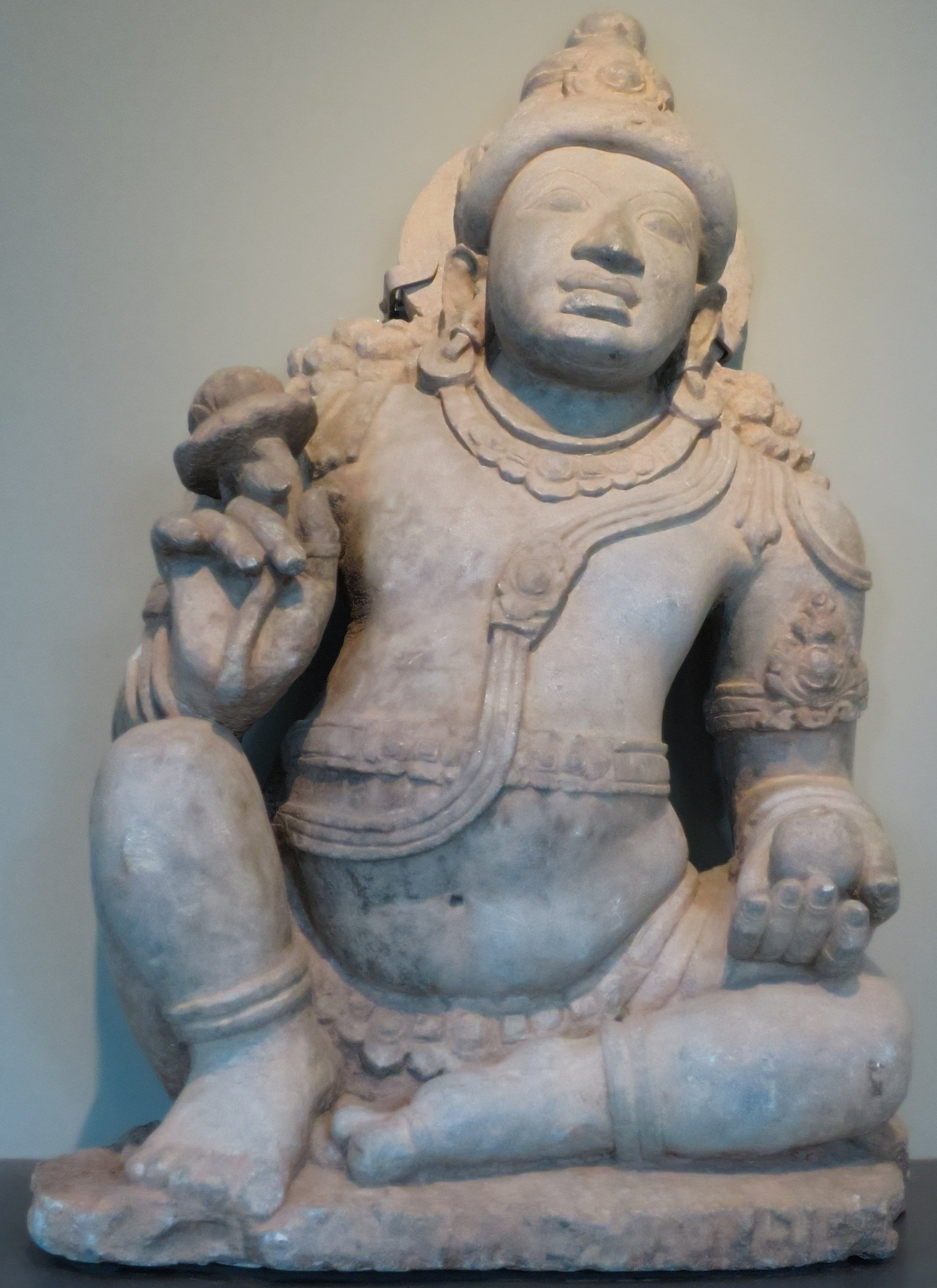
Yaksha Sarvahna, c. 900, Norton Simon Museum

== Colossal statues ==
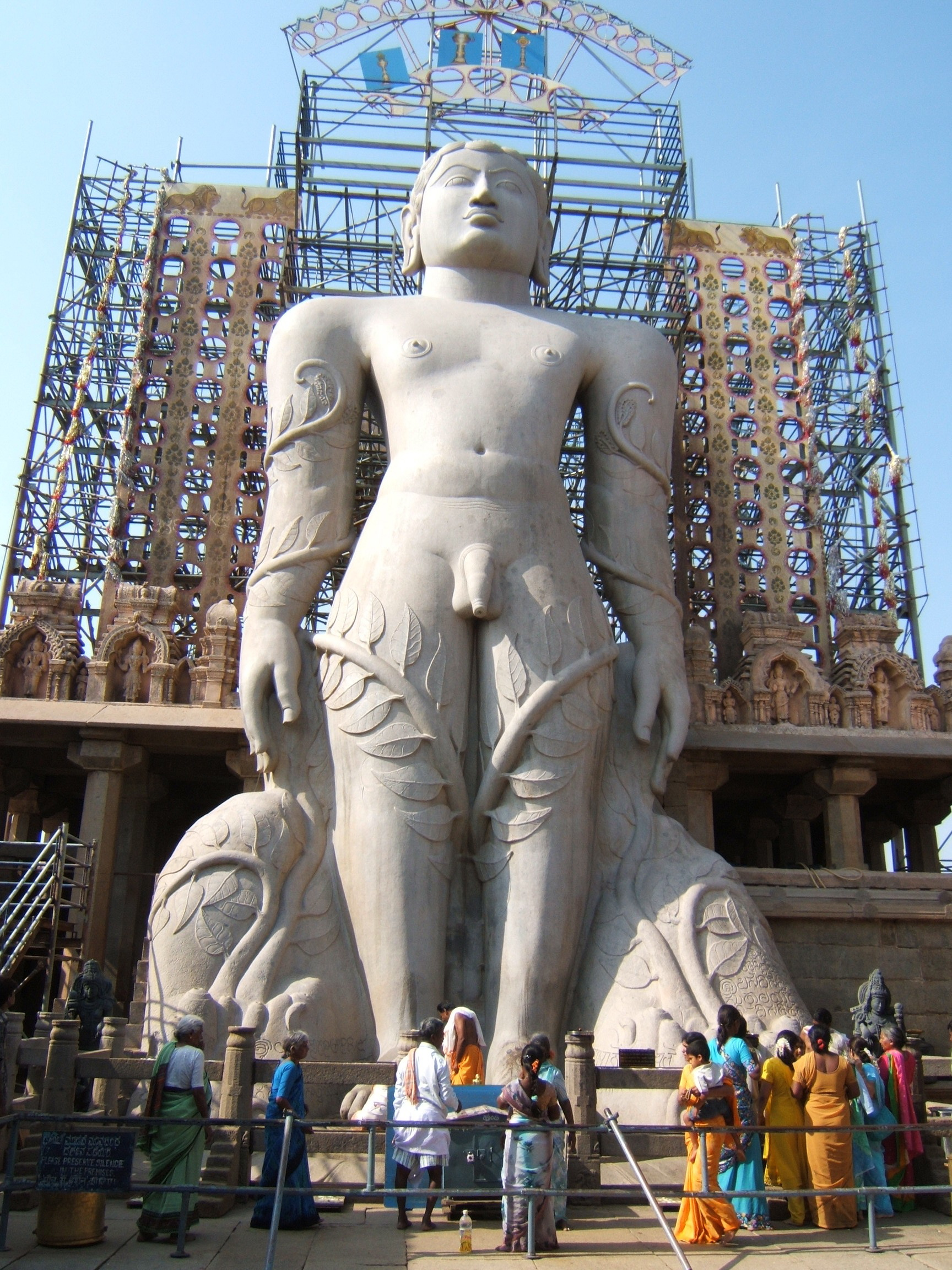
17.4 m (57 ft) Gommateshwara statue at Shravanabelagola, 10th century

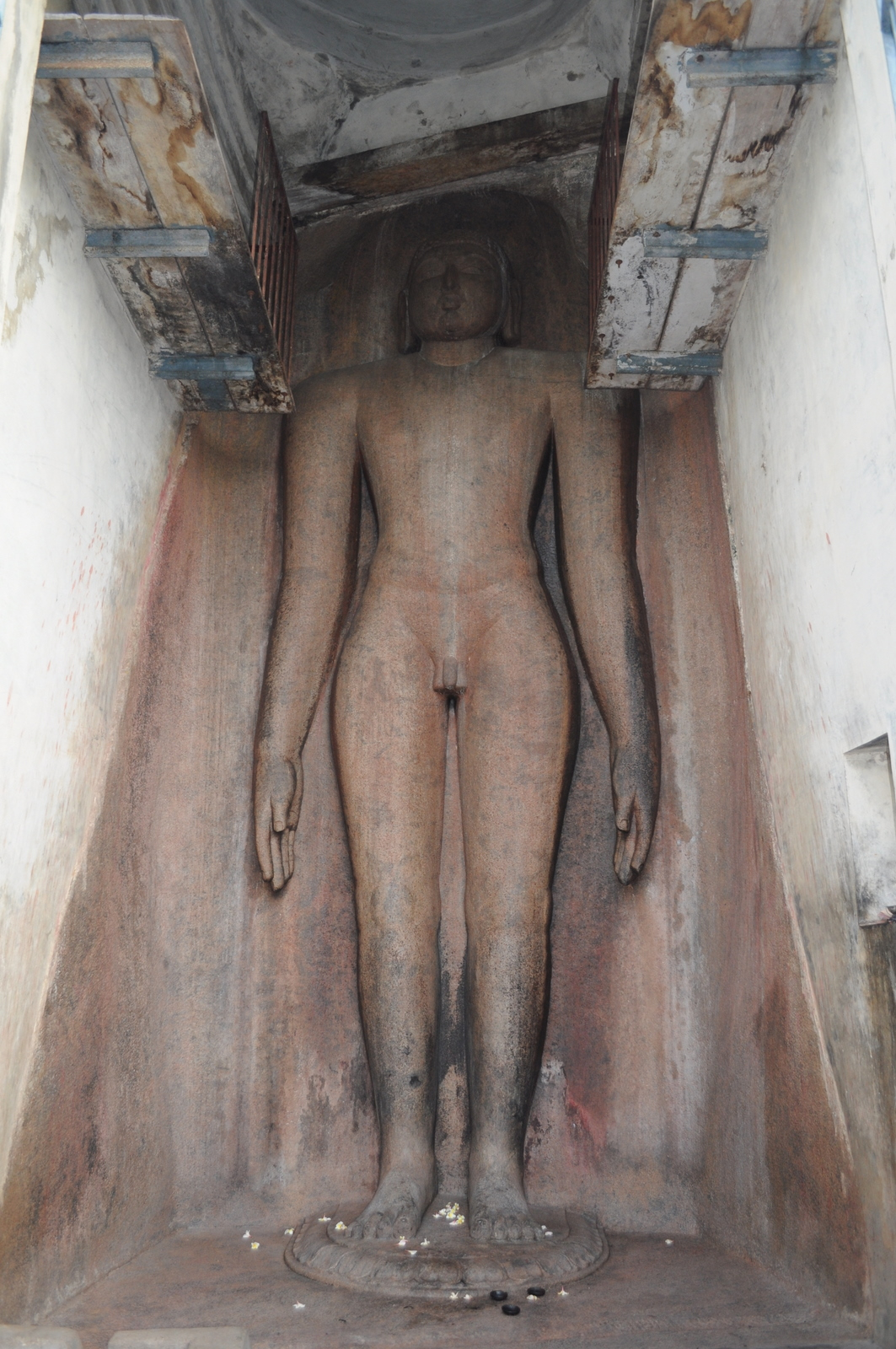
The 16 m (52 ft) statue of Neminath at Tirumalai, the tallest Jain sculpture in Tamil Nadu

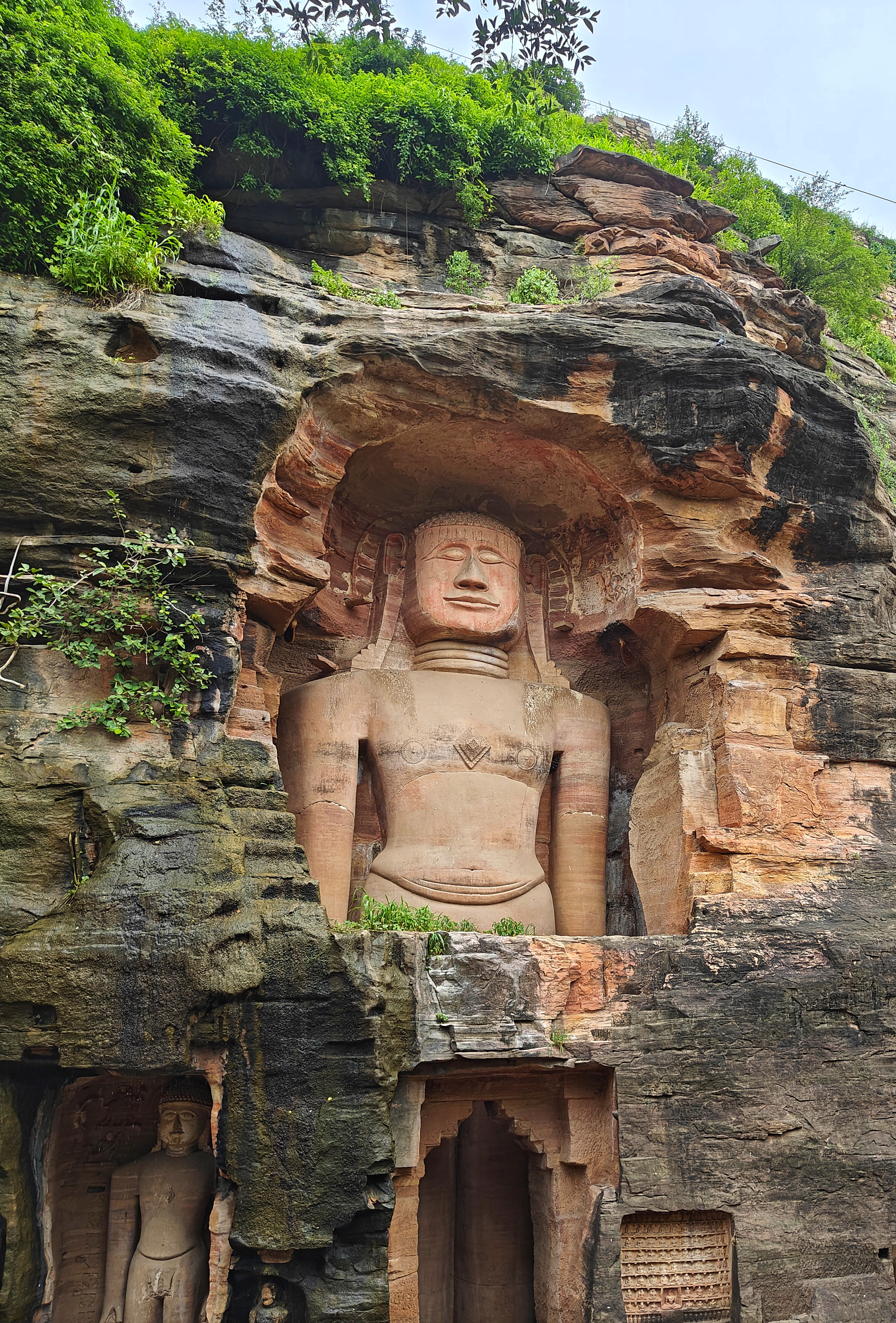
Rishabhanatha statue at Gopachal Hill, Gwalior Fort, 58.4 feet (17.8 m)

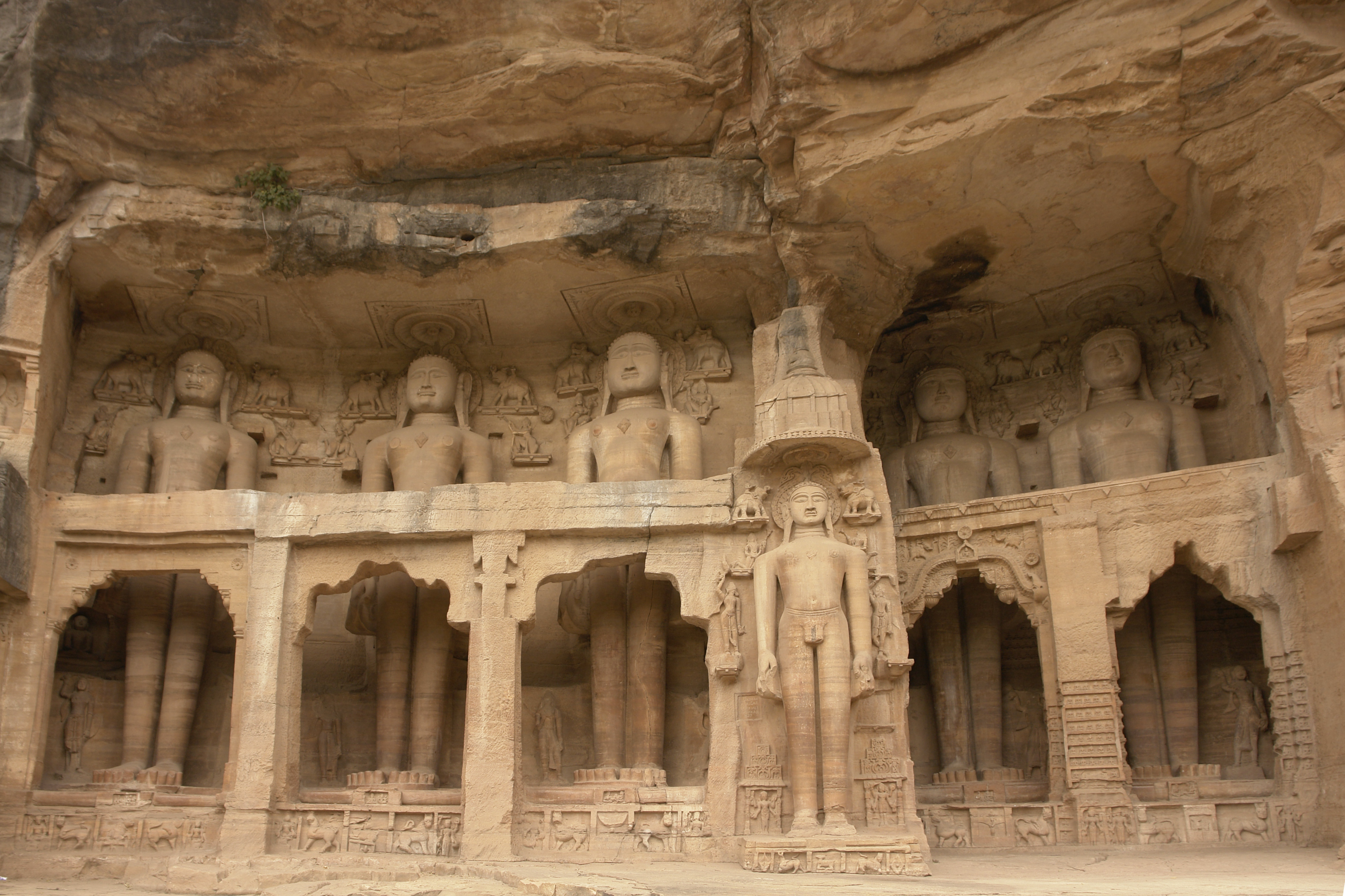
Rock cut Tirthankara statues at Gopachal Hill, Gwalior

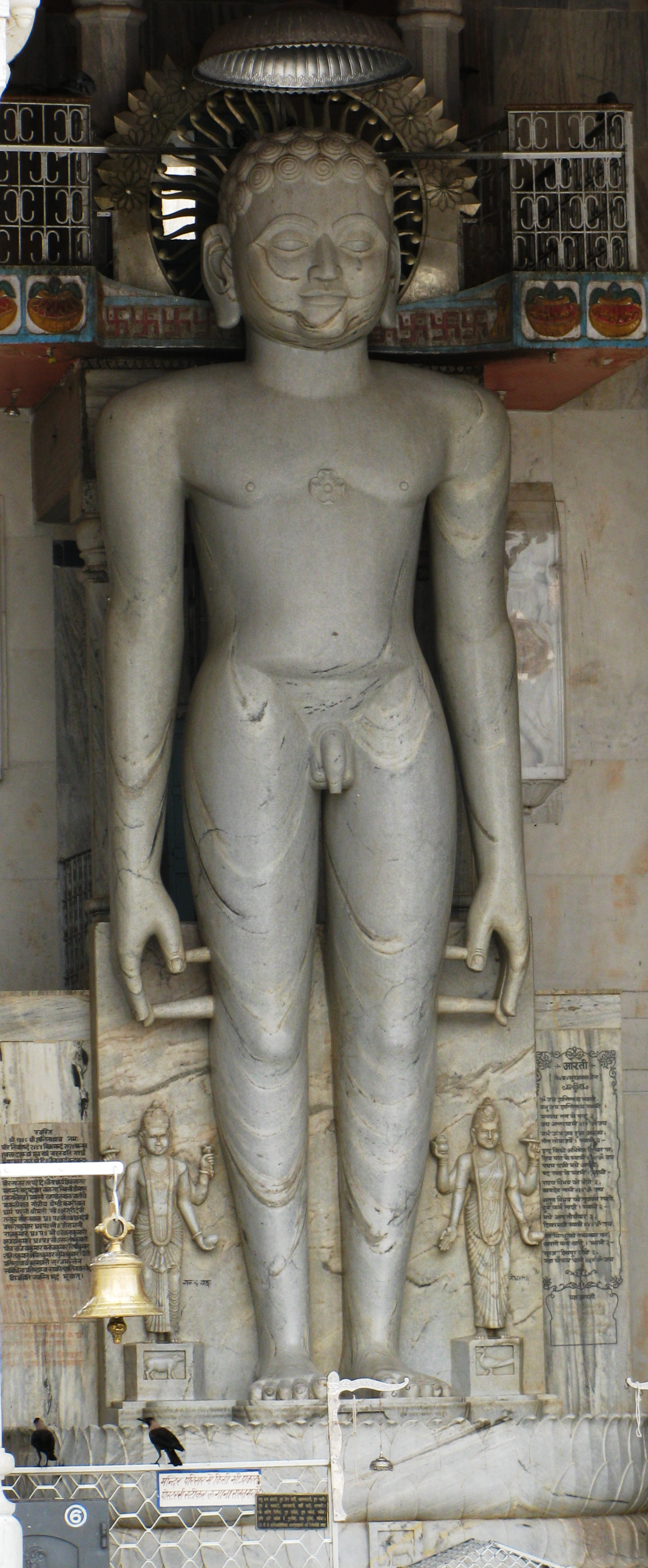
Shantinatha Statue at 9.8 m (32 ft) Shantinath Jinalaya, Shri Mahavirji

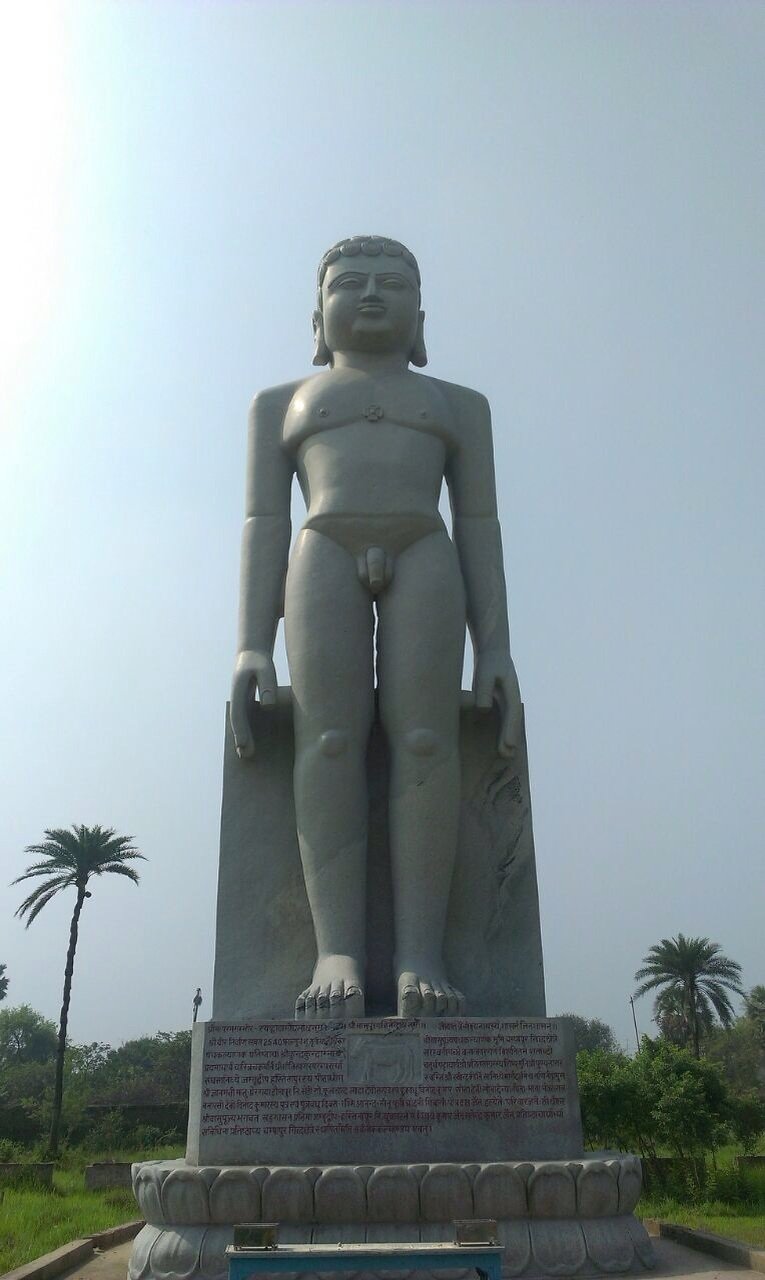
31 ft statue of Lord Vasupujya at Champapur, Bhagalpur

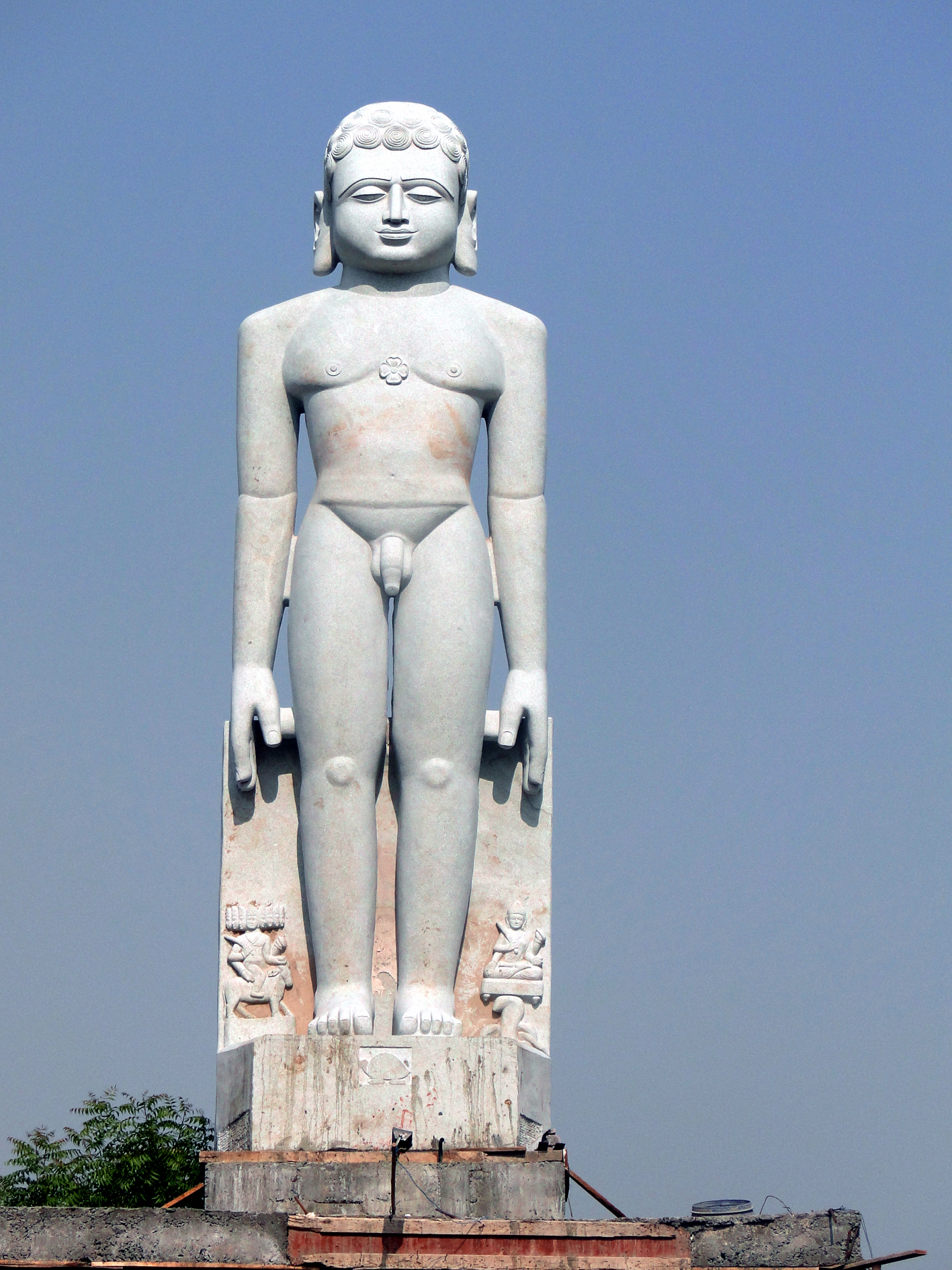
Munisuvrata statue at 8.23 m (27.0 ft) Shantinath Jain Teerth

== See also ==
- Lohanipur torso
- Akota Bronzes
- Chausa hoard
- Thirakoil
- Jain architecture
- Jain temple
