= Pavagadh =

- Pawagadh
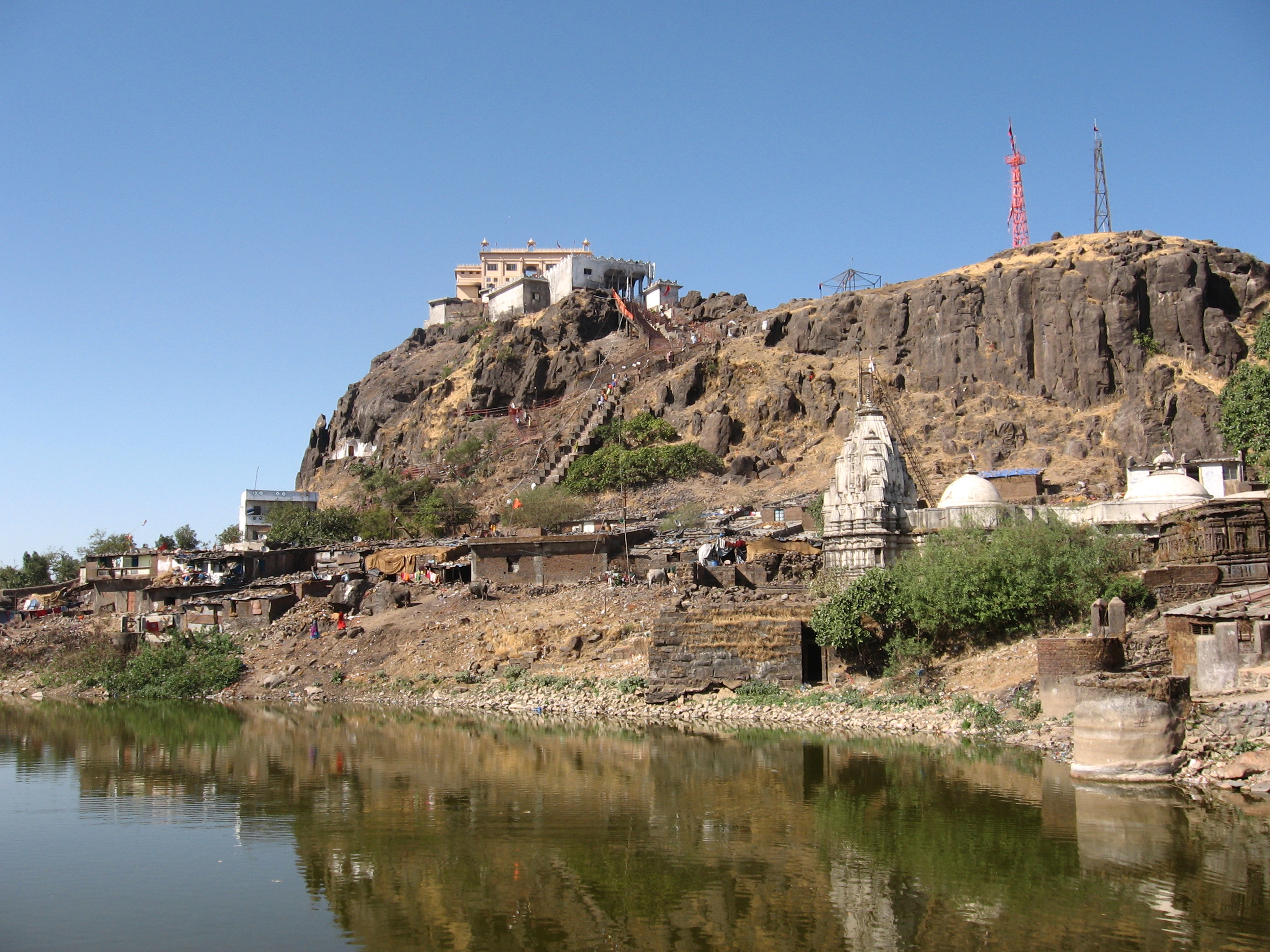
- Kalika Mata Temple on Pavagadh Hill

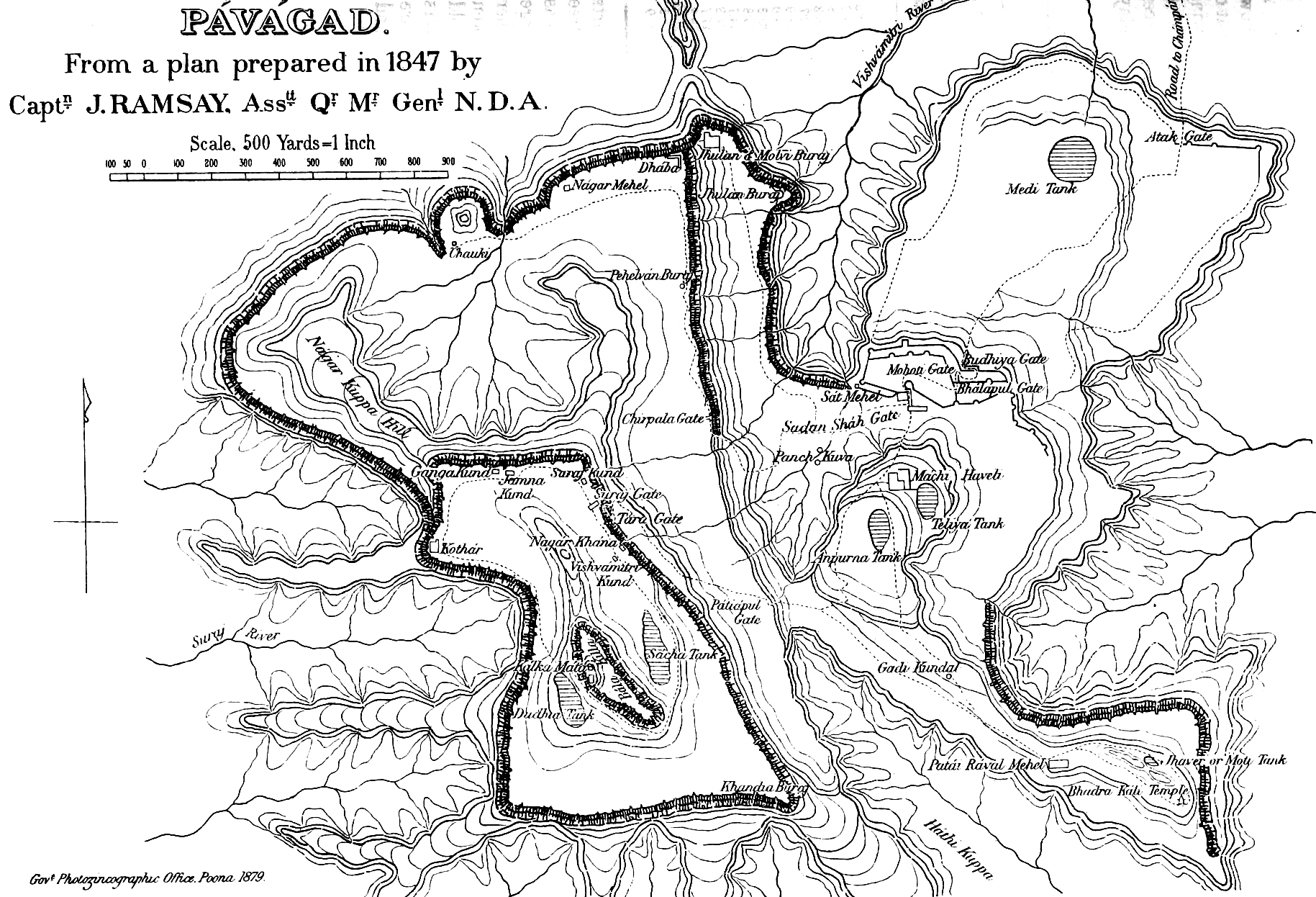
- Plan of Pavagadh, 1847, by J Ramsay
- Coordinates: 22.46672°N 73.50048°E
- India: India
- Gujarat: Gujarat
- District: Panchmahal
- Elevation: 762 m (2,500 ft)

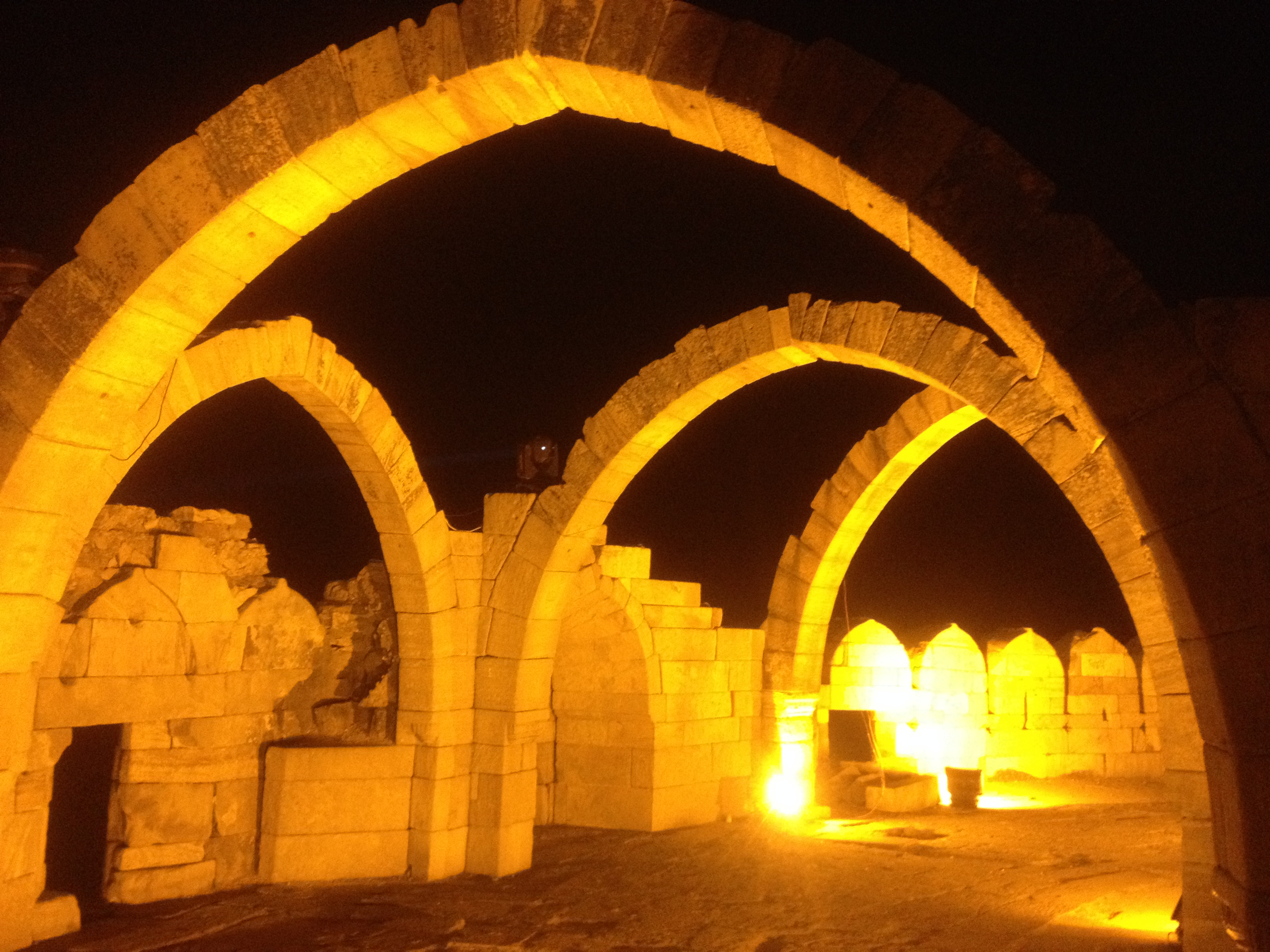
Saat Kamaan, Pavagadh

Pavagadh is a municipal operated region in Panchmahal district about 46 kilometres (29 mi) away from Vadodara in Gujarat state in western India. It is known for a famous Mahakali temple. As per records, this was originally a Jain temple belonging to the Svetambara Achalgaccha sect, whose Adhistayika Mahakali's idol was installed here in the 12th century. This locality Champaner-Pavagadh Archaeological Park was declared by UNESCO as a World Heritage Site in 2004.

== History ==
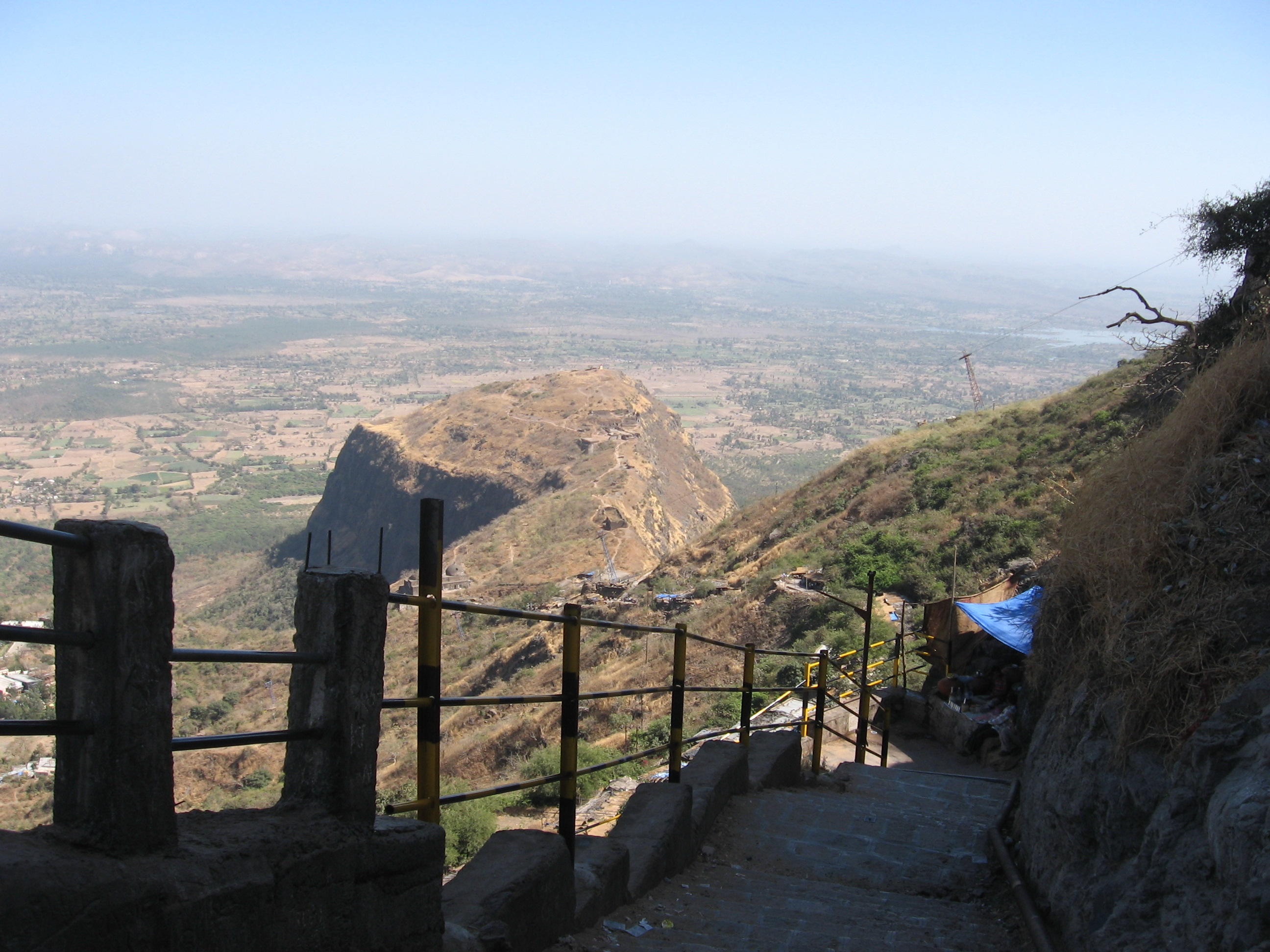
Pavagadh Hill's Footsteps

Pavagadh was an Ancient Jain Pilgrimage. In 140 CE, Greek geographer Ptolemy during his tour to India stated that Pavagadh is very ancient & holy, which proves its antiquity. It is stated that Raja Gangasinh, a successor of Emperor Ashok got the fort & the temples of Pavagadh repaired. There have been several attempts to destroy the evidence of its Jain heritage. However, the court ordered against destruction of facts and heritage.

The Jain history of Pavagadh dates back to 3rd century BC.

1. King Samprati, in the 3rd century BC, constructed the temple and installed the idol of Sambhavnatha which was consecrated by Svetambara Jain monk Acharya Suhastisuri.
2. In 1055 CE, Śvetāmbara monk Acharya Gunsagarsuri consecrated a new temple of Jirawala Parshvanath and reconstructed an ancient 52-shrine Temple of Abhinandanswami.
3. In 1113 CE, the Achalgacch of the Śvetāmbara sect of Jainism was established here by Acharya Aryarakshitsuri. He was unhappy with the wrong practices that had crept into the conduct of Jain monks due to the influence of yatis. He attempted reforms, but failed. Therefore, he ascended the hill to perform Santhara or Sallekhana. The Legend says that demi-goddess Mahakali appeared before him and requested the Acharya not to perform Sallekhana and told him that he was the only one who could spread the Truth. She asked him to start a new order based on the truth of the Agamas and assured him that she would safeguard the lay-followers of the new order and that they will prosper. Thus, in 1113 CE, Acharya Aryarakshitsuri founded the Anchalgacch (or Viddhipaksh) at Pavagadh, and installed demi-goddess Mahakali as the Adhishthayika (transl. protecting deity) of the gaccha. The founder Śrāvakas of the gaccha installed the idol of Mahakali on the hill to mark their respects. This is the idol and the shrine which was later encroached upon by the Hindus, who additionally installed two more of their idols.
4. There is a reference to a temple called “Sarvatobhadra” (auspicious on all sides) built by Minister Tejpal in the 12th century.
5. Ceremonial installation and consecration of a temple built by Jayawant Seth by Acharya Vijaysensuri in 1581 CE.
6. Under the guidance of Acharya Kalyansagarsuri, a monk and reformer of Achalgacch, sravakas Sheth Vardhaman and Sheth Padamshin reconstructed the shrine of Mahakali in 16th century CE.
7. In 1689 CE, Gani Shilvijay Maharaj has referred to the existence of a temple of Neminatha. which was destructed, fragments of which have been placed on the steps going uphill to the Mahakali Temple.
8. In a laudatory poem dedicated to Jirawala Parshvanatha and composed by Jain monk Dipvijay Kaviraaj in late 18th century CE, the temples existing here are described in detail.

Several monks of the Achalgacch such as Acharya Mahendraprabhasuri, Acharya Merutungasuri, Acharya Jaykesarisuri amongst many, and those of the Tapagacch such as Acharya Dharmaratnasuri, Acharya Hemvimalsuri, Acharya Laxmisagarsuri, Acharya Bhuvansundarsuri etc. have consecrated Jain temples and idols on the hill. According to several Śvetāmbara scriptures, at one time, these shrines were considered to be of equal rank and importance as those atop the hill at Palitana.

It is believed that there was one large Śvetāmbara temple earlier on the hill, which faced multiple invasions. The ruins of that temple have been used to construct 3 smaller Digambar temples by the Digambar community who have taken over these Svetambar temples.

It is said that King Vanraj Chavda established Champaner at the foot of Pavagadh in fond memory of his wise minister Champa. Later, the Patai Raval family ruled Pavagadh and took care of the boundary. The local folk tales say that Mahakali assumed the form of a woman and danced in a Garba during Navaratri. The last Patai, Jaisinh watched her with dirty looks. The deity became angry at Jaisinh and cursed him that the town will fall. Eventually, the Muslim emperor of Gujarat, Mahmud Begada assaulted Pavagadh and won the hill on the boundary in the 15th century.

Patai was defeated and killed. Mahmud Begada shifted his capital from Ahmedabad to Champaner for some time for reasons of Diplomacy. He developed the town by constructing buildings such as the fort of Champaner, Uohra mosque, Mandavi, Kirtistambh, the temple of Shalkh, Jama Masjid (originally a Jain temple), Nagina Mosque and Kevda Mosque. The remains of the Palace of Begada are still found near Vad Talav (Banyan Pond) two kilometers (1.25 miles) away from Champaner by road.

The government has granted many concessions and offered subsidies to the new industries coming up in this area. As a result of it, Halol and Kalol towns near Pavagadh have turned into virtual Industrial estates. A film studio at Halol has this added advantage.

== Geography ==
Pavagadh is the gateway to Panchmahal. The locations of hilly areas around Halol provide good scenery. Pavagadh Hill has total height of 822 meters and you can find many scenic trails to climb including waterfalls during monsoon time. The plateau at an altitude of 490 meters is known as Machi Haveli. The bus service has been extended up to Machi.

== Places of interest ==
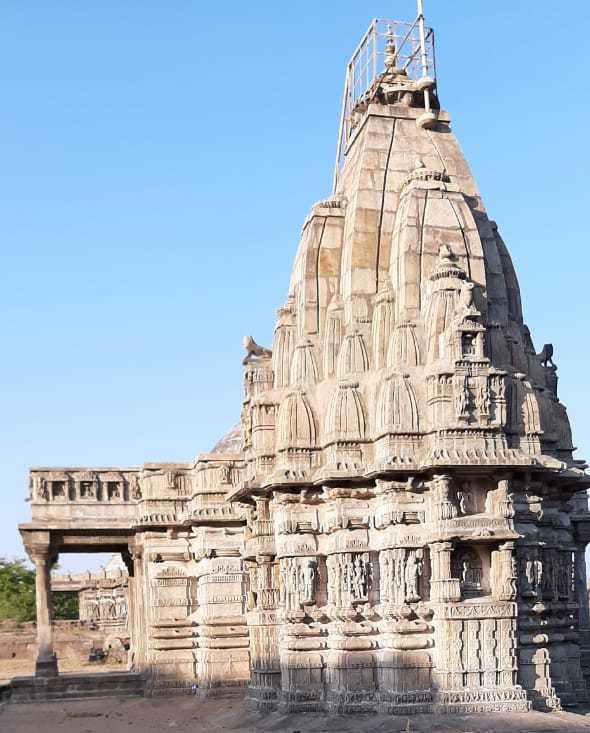
Pavagadh Jain temple

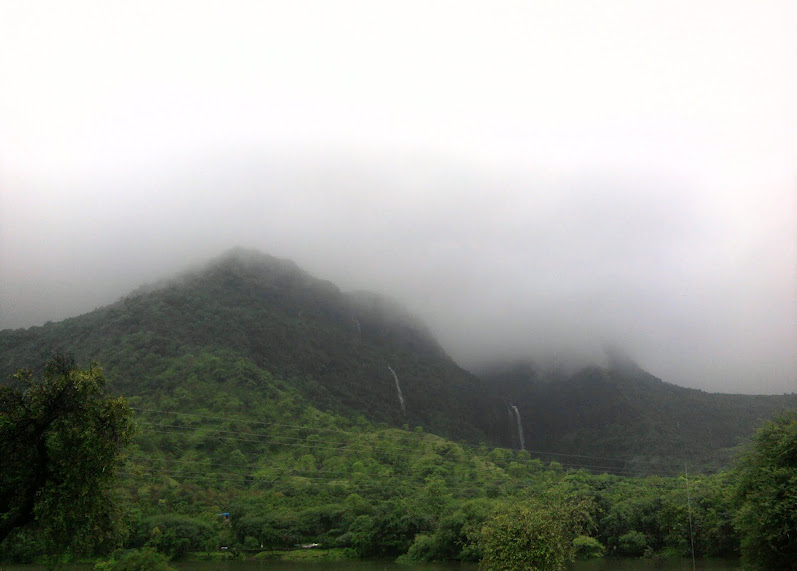
Pavagadh in monsoon

- Pavagadh Jain Temple: The temples of Jainism at Pavagadh are noteworthy. They fall into three different groups: The first consists of the Bhavanaderi temples near the Naqqarkhana gate called the Navalakka temples, the second group is in honor of the Tirthankaras Suparshvanatha and Chandraprabhu and the third group, situated on the southeast of Pavagadh Hill (Mataji's cliff), is near the Pārśva temple next to the Dudhia tank. On the basis of their "stylistic and architectural features", the date of construction of these temples is deduced to be the 14th–15th centuries. The temple is made up of pure white stone with elaborately carved seated and standing images of the Jain pantheon are seen on the outer walls of the temples.
- Kalikamata Temple, now a famous Hindu pilgrim center which was once a Jain site, is located at Pavagadh. Situated amid dense forest cover on a cliff, the temple is believed to be one of the 51 Shakti Peeths. Maa Mahakalika Udan Khotala (A Passenger Ropeway) is operating since 1986 and takes you quickly and comfortably from Manchi to the hilltop near the Maha Kalika Temple in about 6 minutes, whereas, the steep climb on foot takes over one hour. The temple of Kali is at the height of 550 metres (1,523 feet). A rope-way facility has been made available (commissioned in 1986) to the tourists to reach the temple. About 250 steps have to be climbed from there.

== Reconstruction of the Temple ==
Pavagadh temple has a controversial history as 15th century king Sultan Mahmud Begda, who ruled Champaner, where the temple is located, is said to have destroyed the "shikhar" or spire of the temple. During that time a shrine "Sadanshah Pir Dargah" was said to have been built in the 11th century temple complex. During the renovation, the dargah was shifted amicably next to the temple and the "shikhar" was constructed. A restoration was also perform by lay-followers of the Jain monk Acharya Kalyansagarsuri of Achalgaccha.

== Notable people ==
The great music maestro of 16th century, and Tansen's contemporary rival, Baiju Bawra belonged to Champaner.
