= Achal Gaccha =

Monastic order of Śvetāmbara Jainism

Achal Gaccha, also known as the Vidhipakṣa or Anchal Gaccha (Hindi: अचलगच्छ or अंचलगच्छ) is one of the four existing Gacchas and one of the 84 gacchas of the Śvetāmbara Murtipujaka sect of Jainism. It was founded by Acharya Aryarakshitsuri in 1079 CE in response to the laxity that had crept into monasticism. Except for some minors differences, the rules and rituals of Achal Gaccha are similar to all the other existing gacchas of the Śvetāmbara Murtipujaka sect.

Currently, Acharya Kalāprabhasāgarsuri is the gacchadhipati of Achal Gaccha who was declared as Gunodayasāgarsuri's successor after his demise in 2020. Acharya Kalāprabhasāgarsuri was formally crowned gacchadhipati of Achal Gaccha in 2022 in Mulund.

== History and origin ==
Akin to the remaining three, Achal Gaccha traces its roots to the then Vada Gachha which was the unbroken lineage of monks, starting with one of Mahavira's 11 Ganadharas, Sudharmaswami. Initially, the name of Achal Gaccha was Vidhipaksh Gaccha (transl. a group of monks who follow the canon in its pure form).

Achal Gaccha was founded by Aryarakshitsuri in the 11th century CE. Aryarakshitsuri, upset with the wrong practices prevalent in monkhood during that time, decided to reform the sangha and eradicate malpractices and laxity. He, therefore, started investing efforts towards the goal, but when it seemed impossible to perform reforms successfully, he decided to perform sallekhana atop Pavagadh Hill. Legends say that Aryarakshitsuri was praised by Simandhara in Mahavideha Kshetra. Upon hearing this, demigoddess Chakreshvari visited Aryarakshitsuri and requested him to give up his vow of sallekhana. On the next day, a lay follower named Yashodhan came to pilgrimage to Pavagadh, where he offered alms to Aryarakshitsuri. Pleased with the monk's lifestyle and wisdom, he became his first lay disciple. Aryarakshitsuri reformed the sangha and enlisted the rules and rituals of the newly formed gaccha. The group of monks who followed Aryarakshitsuri's rules then came to be known as the Vidhipakṣa Gaccha.

After the reforms, several acharyas of other gacchas such as Shankheshwar Gaccha, Nanak Gaccha, Vallabhi Gaccha, Nadol Gaccha, and Bhinmal Gaccha accepted the practices of Aryarakshitsuri and merged their order into the Vidhi Pakṣa Gaccha. Jhalori Gaccha, Jhadapalliya Gaccha, Aagam Gaccha, Poornima Gaccha, and Sadhupoornima Gaccha partially accepted the practices of the Vidhi Pakṣa Gaccha. There were a total of 3,517 ascetics in Aryarakshitsuri's order after his reforms. Out of these, 2,202 were monks, and 1,302 were nuns.

== Legends ==
Several legends are associated with Achal Gaccha. Some of these are listed below: -

- A legend says that demigoddess Mahakali was pleased with the austerities and wisdom of Aryarakshitsuri, so she became his devotee and promised him that she would protect his order and srāvakas of the sangha. Since then, she is known as the adhishthayikā (transl. protecting deity) of Achal Gaccha. She holds the same status that Maṇibhadra holds for Tapa Gaccha.
- Another legend that explains how Vidhipakṣa Gaccha came to be known as 'Achal Gaccha'. Once, Sidhharāj Jaysingh, the then king of Gujarat, was performing Putra-Kāmeshti Yagya, a Homa to be blessed with a male child. A cow died due to a snake bite at the place where the homa was going on. To successfully complete the homa, it was important for the cow to come out alive. Ministers suggested seeking help from Aryarakshitsuri. The king agreed and requested his help. Aryarakshitsuri, upon seeing this as an opportunity to promote Jainism by helping the king, agreed to it. He entered the cow's body with his magical powers and made the cow walk out of the place. Pleased, the king then named Aryarakshitsuri's order as 'Achal Gaccha' (transl. the one who stayed firm on his words).
- Once, King Kumarpala's minister, Kapardi, who was a lay disciple of Acharya Aryarakshitsuri, visited the palace where Kumarpala and Acharya Hemachandrasuri were engaged in a discussion. The minister performed guru-vandan to Hemachandrasuri, during which, he kept the tip of his shoulder-cloth in front of his mouth instead of a muhapatti. Surprised with the minister's act, the king asked Hemachandrasuri about the method and its authenticity as per scriptures. Hemachandra confirmed the authenticity of the method in accordance with the scriptures. Hence, the king named Vidhipakṣa Gaccha as Anchal Gaccha (transl. anchal: the tip of the shoulder-cloth). The king went to Aryarakshitsuri and bowed down to him.
- Numerous legends such as that of king Mahipal of Parkar are associated with Achal Gaccha.

== Notable people ==
=== Monks ===
- Jaysinhsuri
- Dharmaghoshsuri
- Mahendrasinhsuri, the author of Shatpadi Bhashantar.
- Merutungasuri, the author of Prabandha-Chintamani and Jain Meghdoot Kavya.
- Dharmamurtisuri
- Kalyansagarsuri, the author of several works of literature, including the Jaina version of the Bhagavad Gita.
- Gautamsāgarsuri
- Gunsāgarsuri
- Gunodaysāgarsuri
- Kalāprabhasāgarsuri

=== Lay followers ===
In 1154 CE, Hameer, the king of Ratanpur, and his son Jesangde, along with their family, had accepted the 12 vows of Śrāvaka from Aryarakshitsuri and had become lay followers of Achal Gaccha. Jesangde had two other names "Sakhatsangh" and "Malde". His descendants can be identified with surname "Malde" in the Oswal community. Apart from that, the ancestors of Sahashguna-Gandhi and Vadera clan were also lay followers of Achal Gaccha.

== See also ==
- Upkeśa Gaccha
- Kharatara Gaccha
- Vimalsuri
