= Pavagadh Hill =

Hill in Gujarat, India

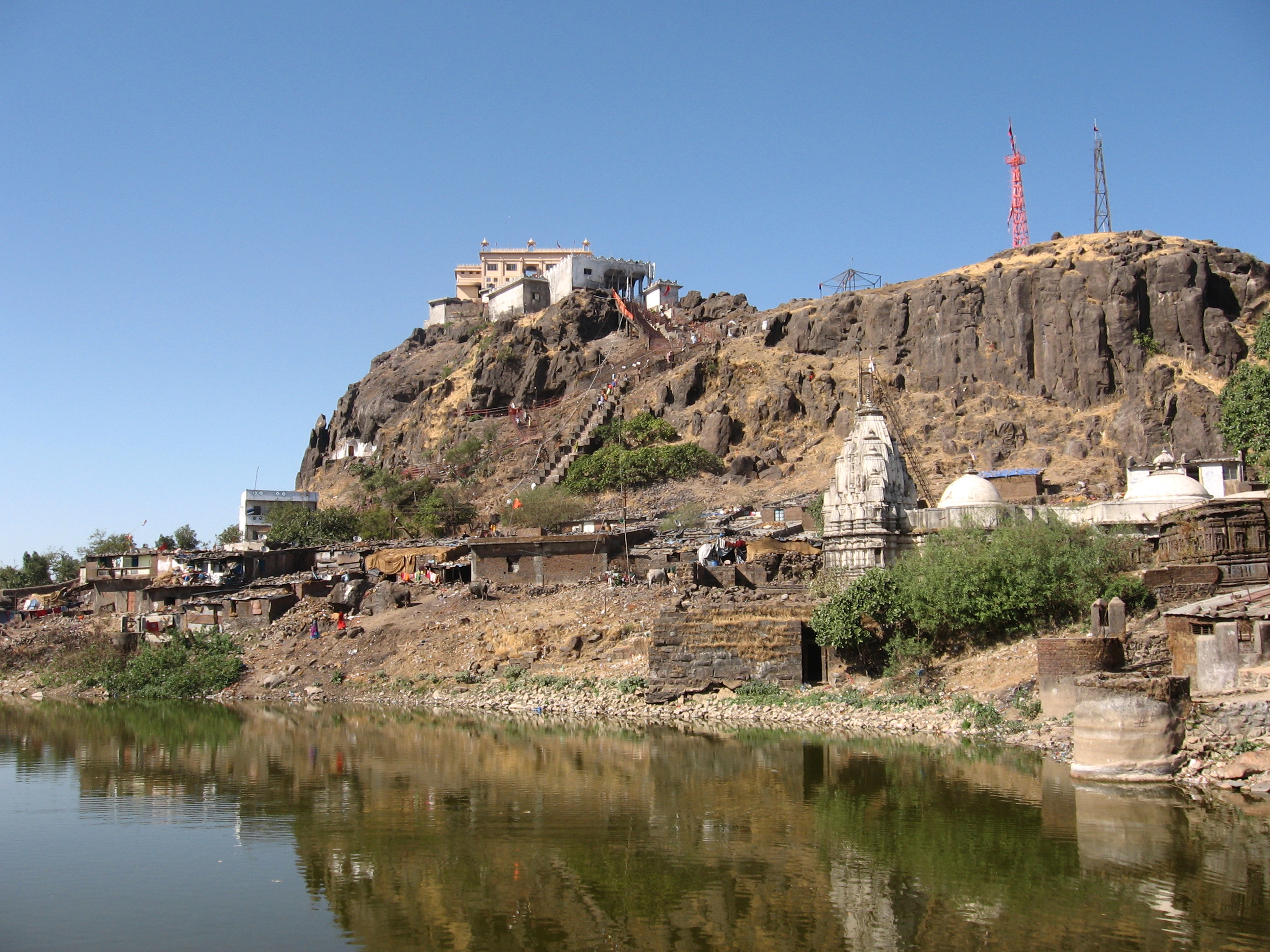
- Summit of Pavagadh Hill with the famed Kalika Mata Temple shrine on the peak

Highest point
- Elevation: 800 m (2,600 ft)
- Coordinates: 22°28′00″N 73°30′02″E

Geography
- Location within Gujarat
- Location: Panchmahal district, Gujarat, western India
- Parent range: Vindhyachal Range

Geology
- Mountain type: Hill
- Last eruption: 65 million years ago

Climbing
- Easiest route: Ropeway

Pavagadh Hill is situated within a plain in Panchmahal district, Gujarat, western India. A volcanic eruption occurred in the region approximately 500 million years ago and the etymology of Pavagadh is associated with this eruption: Pav-gadh means "one fourth hill" or "fire-hill". At its base is the historical city of Champaner, while the hill station of Pavagadh was built upon the volcanic cone itself. With Champaner, Pavagadh hill forms the Champaner-Pavagadh Archaeological Park, a UNESCO World Heritage Site which is spread over an area of more than 1,329 hectares (3,280 acres). Known for its forts, there are also dozens of heritage structures on the hill. The site is 50 kilometres (31 mi) east of Vadodara and 68 kilometres (42 mi) south of Godhra.

Faith based legend surrounding Pavagadh formation suggests that the right foot of Sati is believed to have fallen at Pavagadh, thus forming a deep valley and the God later on "sent a large hill as per the request of Rishi Vishwamitra to fill up this deep valley so that the sage's sacred cows do not fall into it." Thus Kalika Mata Temple at Pavagadh is one of the holiest of Shakta pithas in Indian subcontinent."

== Geography ==
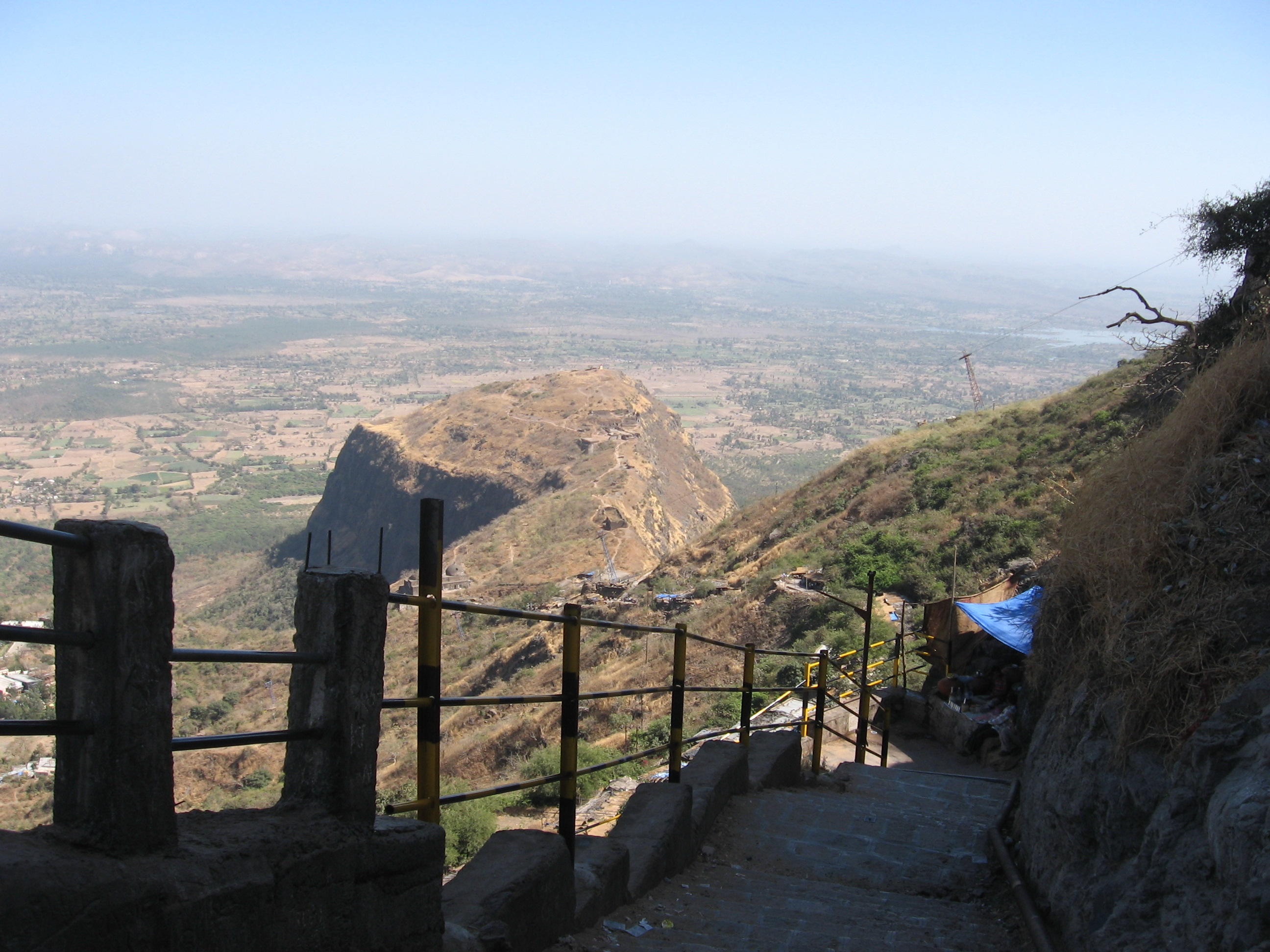
Path up the hill.

The hill is a southern Aravalli Range outlier, rising 800 metres (2,600 ft) above the surrounding plains. The Dhadhar River and Vishwamitri River originate on the hill. The Surya stream, which also rises on the hill, joins the Vishvamitri. There are five successive plateaus, Kalikamata Plateau, Mauliya Plateau, Bhadrakali Plateau, Machi Plateau and Atak Plateau. Plateau reservoirs (talaos) form a chain up the hill. Other features include dense forest, reddish-orange rhyolite boulders, and a natural cave just below the summit. Strong monsoon breezes blow winds upwards onto steep hill slopes.

The arrangement of the rock formations of Pavagadh Hill is stated as being "rhyolite, green bedded tuffs, porphyritic basalt, olivine dolerite and nonporphyritic alkaline basalt." There are steep rock exposures whose geological formation is attributed to ancient volcanic eruptions and lava flows. Pavagadh Hill has a geological setting of reddish-yellow coloured stone, and is considered to be one of the oldest rock formations in India.

The geological formation of Pavagadh Hill is thus very complex. It is interpreted as part of the Deccan Traps, which arose from the "tumultuous outpour of lava beyond 106 cubic km in volume. Eruption is deduced to have occurred 69-65 Ma age. These basaltic rocks said to be one of the largest continental flood basaltic provinces in the world." Studies carried by geologists have indicated eleven basic flows superposed by felsic volcanics. New varieties of rocks such as "rhyodacite, alkal-olivine basalt, mugearite and ankaramite" are reported. It is also recorded that except for rhyolite, all the rocks have an "alkaline-oloivine lineage." Geologists have also observed that "seventeen horizontal flows have occurred in Pavagadh" and postulated that the "whole series resulted by fractionalism in two episodes."

The highest point of the hill presents an undulating forested topography in the direction of Jambughoda. The path ascending the hill passes through many old gates and cuts through natural ledges of rock like a staircase, with precipitous sides. Midway up this path is a flat ground which is strewn with boulders. The mountain above the flat ground is a very steep hill scarp.

== Transportation ==
While private vehicles are not allowed, registered buses and government vehicles provide transportation up the hill. As the road ends before reaching the summit, there are only two options to reach the top, either on foot or by ropeway. The mono-cable ropeway is 740 metres (2,430 ft) in length. It can carry 1,200 people per hour. It is stated to be the country's highest ropeway, connecting the summit of the hill with the plateaus of Champaner.

== History and legends ==
This was a Jain pilgrimage. There were several attempts to destroy evidences of its Jain heritage. However, a court ordered against destruction of facts and heritage. Its Jain history dates back to 3rd century BC.

1. King Samprati, in the 3rd century BC, constructed and installed the idol of Sambhavnatha which was consecrated by Svetambara Jain monk Acharya Suhastisuri.
2. In 1055 AD, Śvetāmbara monk Acharya Gunsagarsuri consecrated a new temple of Jirawala Parshvanath and reconstructed an ancient 52-shrine temple of Abhinandanswami.
3. In 10th century AD, the Achalgacch of the Śvetāmbara sect of Jainism was established here by Acharya Aryarakshitsuri. He was unhappy with the wrong practices that had crept into the conduct of Jain monks due to the influence of yatis. He attempted reforms, but failed. Therefore, he ascended the hill to perform Sallekhana. Legend says that demi-goddess Mahakali appeared before him and requested the Acharya to not perform Sallekhana and said that he was the only one who could spread the truth. She asked him to start a new order based on the truth of the Agamas and assured him that she would safeguard the lay-followers of the new order and that they will prosper. Thus, in 1112 AD, Acharya Aryarakshitsuri founded the Achalgacch (or Viddhipaksh) at Pavagadh, and installed demi-goddess Mahakali as the adhishthayika (transl. protecting deity) of the gaccha. The founder Śrāvakas of the gaccha installed the idol of Mahakali on the hill to mark their respects. This is the idol and the shrine which was later encroached upon by Hindus.
4. There is a reference to a temple called “Sarvatobhadra” (transl. auspicious on all sides) built by Minister Tejpal in 12th century.
5. Ceremonial installation and consecration of a temple built by Jayawant Seth by Acharya Vijaysensuri in 1581 AD.
6. Under guidance of Acharya Kalyansagarsuri, a monk and reformer of Achalgacch, sravakas Sheth Vardhaman and Sheth Padamshin reconstructed the shrine of Mahakali in 16th century AD.
7. In 1689 AD, Gani Shilvijay Maharaj has referred to the existence of a temple of Neminatha.
8. In a laudatory poem dedicated to Jirawala Parshvanatha and composed by Jain monk Dipvijay Kaviraaj in late 18th century AD, the temples existing here are described in detail.

Several monks of the Achalgacch such as Mahendraprabhasuri, Merutungasuri, and Jaykesarisuri amongst many, and those of the Tapagacch such as Dharmaratnasuri, Hemvimalsuri, Laxmisagarsuri, Bhuvansundarsuri etc. consecrated numerous temples and idols on the hill. According to several Śvetāmbara scriptures, at one time, these shrines were considered to be of equal rank and importance as those atop the hill at Palitana.

It is believed that there was one large Śvetāmbara temple earlier on the hill, which faced multiple invasions. The ruins of this temple were used to construct 3 smaller Digambar temples.

Known for its forts, there are also dozens of heritage structures on the hill. It is part of the Champaner-Pavagadh Archaeological Park, a UNESCO World Heritage Site.

== Jain Temple ==
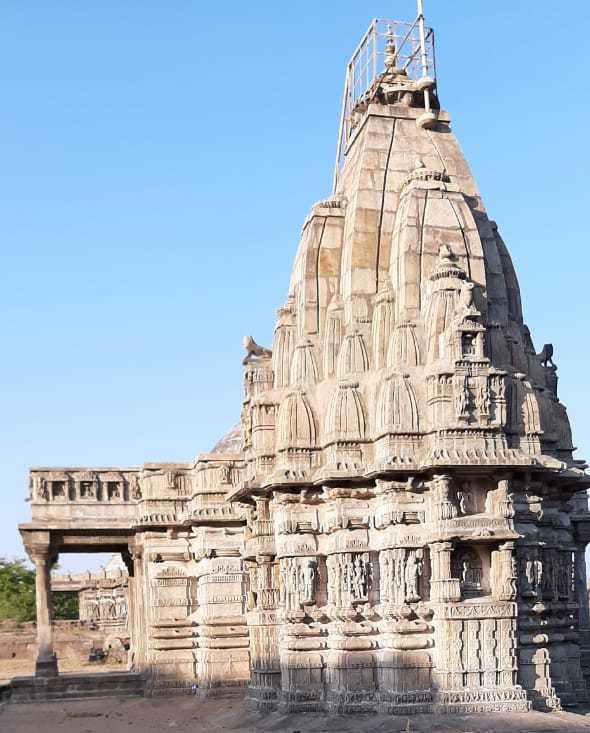
Pavagadh Jain temple

The temples of Jainism at Pavagadh are also noteworthy. They are of three groups: The first consists of the Bhavanaderi temples near the Naqqarkhana gate called the Navalakka temples, the second group is in honour of the tirthankaras Suparshvanatha and Chandraprabhu and the third group, situated on the south east of Pavagarh Hill (Mataji's cliff), is near the Pārśva temple next to the Dudhia tank. On the basis of their "stylistic and architectural features", the date of construction of these temples is deduced to be the 14th–15th centuries. The temple is made up of pure white stone with elaborately carved seated and standing images of the Jain pantheon are seen on the outer walls of the temples. The Garbabrihas are enshrined with beautiful stone images of tirthankaras in these temples. All the temples have been renovated over time. The temple also has a 30 ft. tall statue of God Bahubali stands tall in its vicinity.

The Greek geographer Ptolemy many centuries ago in his work regarded this temple as an ancient and holy place. In 1480 Mahmud Begada, the Muslim sultan of Gujarat, heavily damaged this temple. In 1880 this temple was repaired. The entire complex houses a Dharmshala or guesthouse, a Jain restaurant and gardens.

== Issues and controversy ==
On June 16, 2024, an incident of severe vandalism was reported to have happened on the hill. Several Tirthankara idols at the sides of the staircase on the old path to reach the Kalika Mata shrine were desecrated and broken down. Jain monk Jinpremvijaya spearheaded a peaceful but powerful protest at the local collector's office where local Jains turned up in huge numbers. The protest is said to have begun at the evening of June 16, 2024 and went on overnight into June 17, 2024. Most desecrated idols were over 400 years old, some even ancient and belonged exclusively to the Śvetāmbara sect.

== See also ==
- Sacred mountains of India
- Jain temples, Pavagadh
- Palitana temples
- Monuments of Champaner-Pavagadh Archaeological Park
