= Munisundarsuri =

Medieval Śvetāmbara Jain monk and lineage historian

Acharya Munisundarsuri
- Title: Jain Acharya

Personal life
- Flourished: 15th century CE (scholarly estimate)
- Known for: Tapā Gaccha lineage historiography; attributed didactic literature

Religious life
- Religion: Jainism
- Denomination: Murtipujaka
- School: Tapa Gaccha
- Sect: Śvetāmbara

Acharya Munisundarsuri (also rendered Munisundara Sūri) was a medieval Śvetāmbara Jain monk associated with the Mūrtipūjaka tradition and aligned with the Tapā Gaccha, the largest Śvetāmbara monastic order from the late medieval period onward. Modern academic scholarship situates him in the fifteenth century CE, primarily on the basis of transmitted dates preserved in Tapā Gaccha lineage chronicles (gurvāvalī or paṭṭāvalī) attributed to him. Scholars emphasise that chronological reconstruction remains approximate because Vikrama Saṃvat dates are subject to regional calendrical conventions when converted into the Common Era.

Within Śvetāmbara Jainism, Munisundarsuri is recognised not as a speculative philosopher but as a representative of the scholastic and institutional culture of late medieval Jain monasticism, in which lineage historiography, didactic composition, and Sanskrit textual production played a central role in articulating monastic authority and collective memory.

== Historical context ==
The historical milieu in which Munisundarsuri is placed corresponds to a period of consolidation among Śvetāmbara monastic orders in western and central India. From the thirteenth century onward, Jain monastic communities increasingly organised themselves into clearly defined gacchas, each maintaining formal lineages, disciplinary frameworks, and institutional identities. The Tapā Gaccha emerged during this era as a dominant order characterised by ascetic discipline and close engagement with urban mercantile elites.

Politically, the late medieval western Indian landscape was marked by shifting dynastic regimes, including the Vaghela rulers and early Sultanate administrations. Scholars have demonstrated that Jain monks frequently interacted with political authorities and wealthy lay patrons, particularly merchants, who supported monastic institutions through endowments and manuscript sponsorship. These interactions shaped the social role of Jain monasticism during this period.

== Monastic affiliation and lineage ==
Munisundarsuri is identified in academic literature as a monk of the Tapā Gaccha. His name is associated with an “older” Tapā Gaccha gurvāvalī dated to Vikrama Saṃvat 1466. This transmitted date, discussed by Peter Flügel, forms the primary basis for placing Munisundarsuri in the fifteenth century CE, though scholars stress that the precise Common Era equivalent remains uncertain.

The extant peer-reviewed literature does not permit a secure reconstruction of Munisundarsuri’s personal guru–śiṣya lineage. Modern scholars therefore refrain from harmonising later lineage lists without corroborating manuscript evidence, noting the retrospective nature of many monastic genealogies.

== Intellectual and doctrinal orientation ==
Scholars emphasise that Tapā Gaccha monks of this era prioritised ethical instruction, disciplined exegesis, and institutional continuity over philosophical innovation. Munisundarsuri is therefore interpreted as a transmitter of established doctrine rather than an originator of new theoretical positions.

== Major works ==
Modern reference works and manuscript catalogues attribute several texts to Munisundarsuri, though scholars consistently stress the provisional nature of these attributions.

=== Gurvāvalī ===
The work most securely associated with Munisundarsuri is a Tapā Gaccha gurvāvalī. This lineage chronicle records monastic successions and situates them within broader socio-political narratives. Paul Dundas has drawn attention to passages linking Tapā Gaccha monastic events at Cambay (Khambhat) with the Vaghela minister Vastupāla, illustrating the integration of monastic and regional history.

Scholars treat this gurvāvalī as an important witness to Tapā Gaccha self-representation while cautioning that its narrative strategies reflect institutional agendas rather than purely documentary historiography.

=== Upadeśaratnākara ===
The didactic work Upadeśaratnākara is attributed to Munisundarsuri in major manuscript survey reports. R. G. Bhandarkar’s catalogue of Sanskrit manuscripts lists copies of a text by this title under his name, providing bibliographic evidence of its circulation in Jain manuscript culture.

== Methodology and use of language ==
The Tapā Gaccha scholastic environment was characterised by sustained engagement with Sanskrit alongside canonical Ardhamāgadhī sources. Sanskrit functioned as the primary medium for historiography and scholastic exposition, enabling Śvetāmbara monks to participate in the wider Sanskrit intellectual culture of medieval India.

== Reception and legacy ==
Munisundarsuri’s legacy is primarily institutional and historiographical. His name survives in manuscript catalogues and scholarly reconstructions of Tapā Gaccha history rather than in sustained philosophical debate. Modern scholars regard such figures as essential for understanding how Jain monastic communities constructed historical memory and legitimised authority.

== See also ==
- Śvetāmbara Jainism
- Jain monasticism
- Jain literature
