= Kalyansagarsuri =

Indian Jain ascetic (c. 1577–1661)

Acharya Kalyansagarsuri Maharaj Saheb
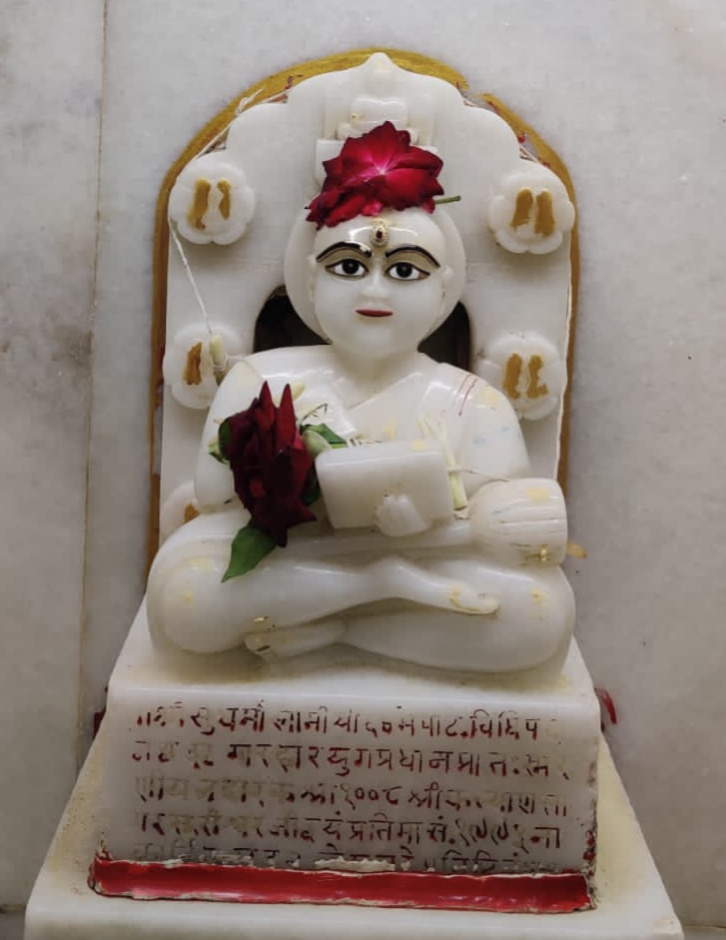
- Idol of Kalyanasagarsuri in Anantnatha Jain Temple, Narshi Natha Street, Mumbai

Personal life
- Born: Kodan Kumar; 1577 Patan, Gujarat
- Died: 1661 Bhuj, Kutch district, Gujarat
- Parents: Naning (father); Namilde (mother)

Religious life
- Religion: Jainism
- Sect: Śvetāmbara
- Initiation: by Acharya Dharmamurtisuri

Kalyansagarsuri (c. 1577 – 1661 CE) was a 16th century Jain ascetic, reformer, philosopher, and researcher belonging to the Achal Gaccha of the Śvetāmbara Murtipujaka sect of Jainism.

== Early life ==
Kodan Kumar was born to Naning (father) of Shrimali clan and Namilde (mother) on the 2nd day of the bright half of Ashadha month in 1577 CE in the town of Lolada in Patan, Gujarat. The town is situated roughly 19 km away from Shankheshwar Jain Temple.

== Initiation ==
With permission from his parents, at the age of 9 years, he was initiated as a Jain monk on 4th day of the bright half of Falguna month in 1586 CE by Acharya Dharmamurtisuri of Achal Gaccha of the Śvetāmbara sect of Jainism in the town of Dholka, Gujarat and was renamed as Kalyansagar.

== Ascetic life ==
=== Consecration as an Acharya ===
After initiation, Kalyansagar began studying the Aagamas, law, poetry, grammar and other scholarly disciplines under his preceptor Dharmamurtisuri's guidance. He was consecrated as an acharya within a short period of 7 years on the 6th day of the bright half of Magha month in 1593 CE. Consequently, he was renamed as Acharya Kalyansagarsuri.

=== Pilgrimage to Palitana ===
After consecration as an acharya, he traveled to Bhadreshwar in Kutch district. After listening to the importance of Palitana in Kalyansagarsuri's sermon, businessman and brothers of the Lalan clan, Sheth Vardhman and Sheth Padamsinh decided to go to Palitana with the Chaturvidha Sangha (transl. four-fold congregation including monks, nuns, male lay followers, and female lay followers) under Kalyansagarsuri's guidance. Lay followers of the sangha came to Jamnagar port by water as the desert of Kutch was said to be dangerous to travel in those days. However, since Jain ascetics do not use vehicles to travel, Kalyansagarsuri and his fellow monks and nuns walked through the Rann of Kutch. From Jamnagar port, the four-fold sangha began its journey towards Palitana with the vow of 6 Ri's as directed by Jain scriptures. The 6 Ri's: -

1. Pad Vihari: Traveling on foot
2. Ekal Aahari: Eating one meal only between sunrise and sunset
3. Bramhachari: Following celibacy
4. Bhumi Santhari: Sleeping on the floor with only one mat on the ground, and no beds or mattresses
5. Sachit Parihari: Not consuming uncooked food or unboiled water
6. Avashyak Kriyakari: Performing the 6 important duties of Shravak, and worshipping the idols of Tirthankaras

Approximately 15,200 people participated in the pilgrimage. Out of these, 200 were male ascetics, 300 were female ascetics, and 15,000 male and female laity (Śrāvakas and Śrāvikas). It took one month for the four-fold sangha to reach Palitana from Jamnagar. After paying their homage to the presiding deity Rishabhanatha, the brothers initiated the construction of a temple atop Mount Shatrunjaya on the 9th day of the bright half of Marghshirsh month in 1594 CE.

In 1596 CE, a businessman named Raaysinh Nagda organized a pilgrimage to Palitana with the vow of 6 Ri's under the guidance of Kalyansgarsuri.

=== Consecration as Achalgacchadhipati ===
His preceptor, Acharya Dharmamurtisuri, in his final days, went to Veraval, where he called demi-goddess Mahakali to solve his dilemma of who to appoint as his successor and to give them the powers of invisibility and flying. Mahakali suggested to choose Kalyansagarsuri as his successor and give him the powers. He was appointed as the leader of Achal Gacch on 11th day of the dark half of the Paush month in 1611 CE in the town of Patan. After the demise of Acharya Dharmamurtisuri, he was declared as Achalgacchadhipati (transl. Leader of Achal Gacch). In 1613 CE, he was given the title of "Yugpradhan" (transl. one who is the leader of the people of that era) in Udaipur by Chaturvidha Jaina Sangha of India.

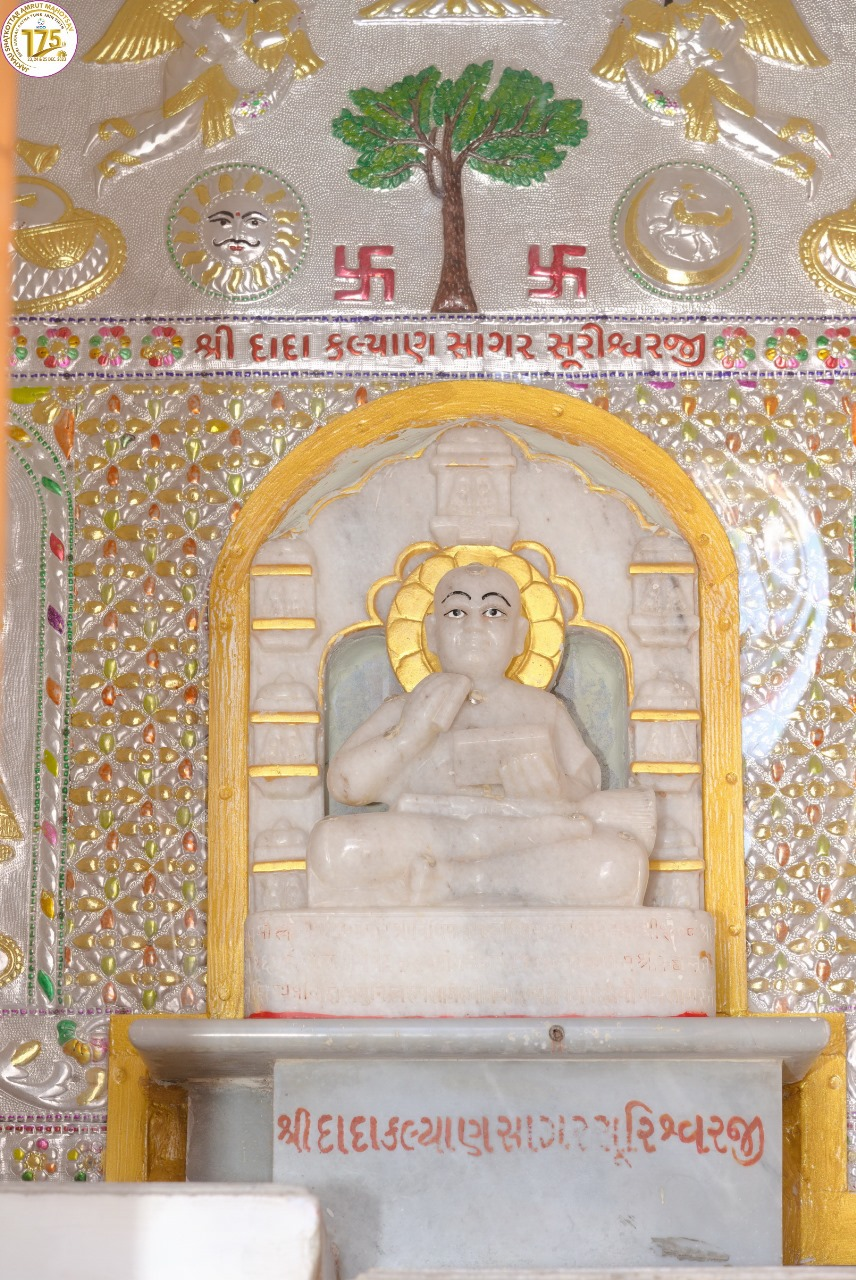
Idol of Kalyansagarsuri at Shri Jakhau Mahavir Swami Tirth, Kutch, Gujarat

=== Consecration of temples and idols ===
Several idols and temples are found where inscriptions mention Kalyansagarsuri's name. In 1617 CE, Kalyansagarsuri consecrated a temple on Mount Shatrunjay in Palitana. The temple was constructed by Sheth Vardhman and Sheth Padamsinh of the Lalan clan. In 1618 CE, upon Raayshi Shah's request, Kalyansagarsuri consecrated a total of 302 Tirthankara idols in the town of Jamnagar. In 1619 CE, on the 3rd day of the bright half of Vaishakh month (Akshay tritiya), the idol of Shantinatha and other Tirthankaras were consecrated by Kalyansagarsuri in the temple constructed by Sheth Vardhman and Sheth Padamsinh of Lalan clan. In 1621 CE, Kalyansagarsuri consecrated 501 Tirthankaraidols in a Bahattara Jinalaya (transl. 1 main shrine and 71 smaller shrines surrounding it) which was also constructed by Lalan brothers.

=== Renovation of pilgrim sites ===
Under the guidance of Kalyansagarsuri, Lalan brothers Sheth Vardhman and Sheth Padamsinh renovated ancient pilgrim sites including, but not limited to Bhadreshwar, Girnar, Taranga, Abu, Shikharji, Pavagadh, Champapuri, Pavapuri, Rajgrihi, Hastinapur, and Varanasi. The brothers also renovated the stone staircase at Girnar, Palitana, and Shikharji under Kalyansagarsuri's guidance. The temple of Adbad Adinath was renovated under the guidance of Kalyansagarsuri.

== Literary contributions ==
Kalyansagarsuri composed several hymns and prayers, and wrote books of varying genres. Some of his popular Sanskrit compositions are:

1. Jain Bhagavad Geeta
2. Parshwanath Ashtottar Shatnaam
3. Ling Nirnay
4. Mishra Ling Kosh
5. Mishra Ling Kosh Vivran
6. Ling Nirnay Granth Vivaran
7. Shantinath Charitra
8. Surpriya Charitra
9. Shree Jin Stotra
10. Parshwanath Sahasranaama
11. Maanikyaswami Stavan
12. Sambhav Jina Stavan
13. Suvidhi Jina Stavan
14. Shanti Jina Stavan
15. Antariksh Parshwanath Stavan
16. Godi Parshwa Ashtak
17. Dada Parshwanath Stavan
18. Kalikund Parshwanath Ashtak
19. Ravan Parshwanath Ashtak
20. Shree Godipur Stavan
21. Shree Chintamani Parshwanathjina Stotra
22. Shree Mahu Parshwanath Ashtak
23. Shree Satyapuriya Mahavir Stavan
24. Shree Godi Parshwanath Stavan
25. Shree Viraashtak
26. Shree Lonan Parshwanath Stavan
27. Shree Sherisa Parshwanath Ashtak
28. Shree Sambhanath Ashtak
29. Shree Chintamani Parshwa Jina Stotra
30. Shree Shauripur Neminath Stavan
31. Shree Shantinath Stavan
32. Shree Parshwanath Stavan
33. Shree Shanti Jina Stavan
34. Vis Viharman Jina Stavan
35. Shree Chaturvinshati Jina Stuti

He also composed Agadadattaras in the Gujarati language.

== Legends ==
During the pilgrimage to Palitana, on one night, Kalyansagarsuri noticed some unusual behavior of birds indicating a risk to lives of Vardhman and Padamsinh. To confirm it, Kalyansagarsuri invoked demi-goddess Mahakali, who confirmed about a deadly risk on both the brothers' lives. She also suggested a way to escape the risk. The next day, Kalyansagarsuri ordered the brothers to take the vow of Paushadh, which the brothers accepted wholeheartedly. While the brothers were walking barefoot with the Kalyansagarsuri, an elephant that accompanied the sangha became aggressive due to sexual desire and it became difficult to control him. After a while, the fetters of the elephant got stuck in the tree branches and the elephant calmed down. After the incident, the whole sangha realized the reason behind the Paushadh vow.

In 1596 CE, while traveling to Bhuj, Kutch, he cured the illness of Maharao Bharmal I, the then king of Kutch, with his magical powers. The pleased king then ordered a ban on animal slaughter in his kingdom during the 8 days of Paryushana and constructed a Jain temple out of respect for Kalyansagarsuri.

In 1612 CE, during chaturmas in Jamnagar, Kalyansagarsuri sent his disciple Ratnasagar to help the wife of the then Nawab of Jamnagar. With his magical powers, Ratnasagar cured the fever of the Nawab's wife. Impressed with the incident, the Nawab and his wife praised Jainism and built an upashraya for Jain ascetics.

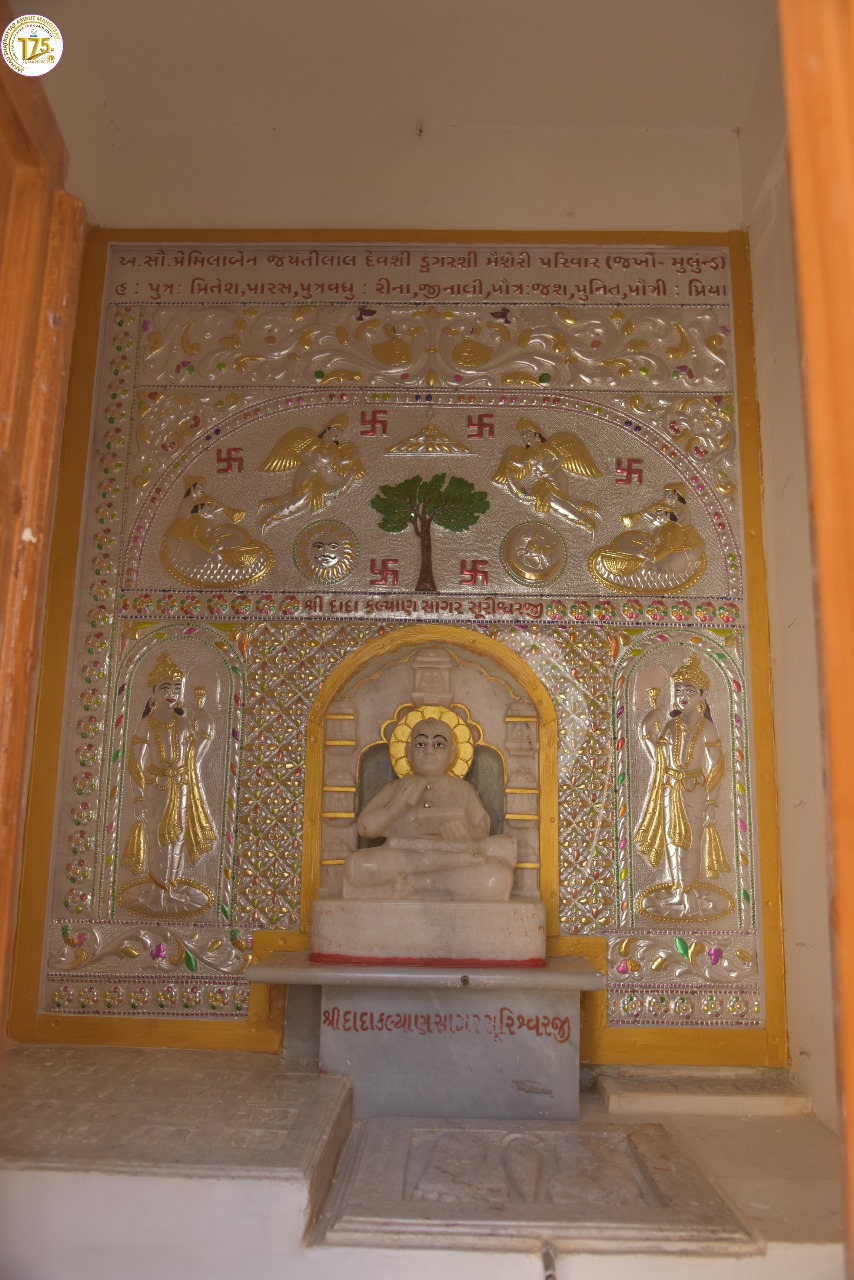
KalyansagarSuri & Footprints of other Acharyas of Achalgachha

In 1614 CE, Kalyansagarsuri consecrated 450 Tirthankara idols in a temple in Agra. The temple was constructed by brothers Kurpal and Sonpal of the Lodha clan. They were also ministers in the Mughal court. The brothers also organized a pilgrimage to Shikharji, Pavapuri, and Palitana apart from renovating several pilgrim sites. Later, when Kalyansagarsuri stayed in Varanasi, rivals of the Jain sangha wrongly influenced the Mughal emperor Jahangir against Jainism. Consequently, Jahangir asked Lodha brothers to show some miracle by the Tirthankaras within 10 days or the temple would be desecrated and destroyed. The younger brother, Sonpal, went to Varanasi where Kalyansagarsuri was staying at that moment to inform him about the incident and asked for help. Kalyansagarsuri relieved him and sent him back. It is said that due to limited time and the long commute between Agra and Varanasi, Kalyansagarsuri reached Agra by flying in the sky. The said magic of flying was taught to Kalyansagarsuri by his preceptor Acharya Dharmamurtisuri. On the tenth day, Jahangir arrived at the temple where Kalyansagarsuri asked him to bow down to the Tirthankara idol if he wanted to witness the miracle. As soon as the emperor bowed down to the idol, it lifted its hand to bless and said, "Dharmalabh" (transl. be blessed with spirituality). It is said that Kalyansagarsuri had ordered the demi-goddess Mahakali to enter the idol and do the said act. Witnessing the miracle, the emperor said that he truly believed in the truthfulness of Jains and that tirthankaras were true gods. Impressed with Kalyansagarsuri, Jahangir gifted 10,000 gold coins to Lodha brothers, which they used for charity.

== Death and legacy ==
Kalyansagarsuri died at the age of 84 on the 13th day of the bright half of Ashwin month in 1661 CE during chaturmas in Bhuj, Kutch.

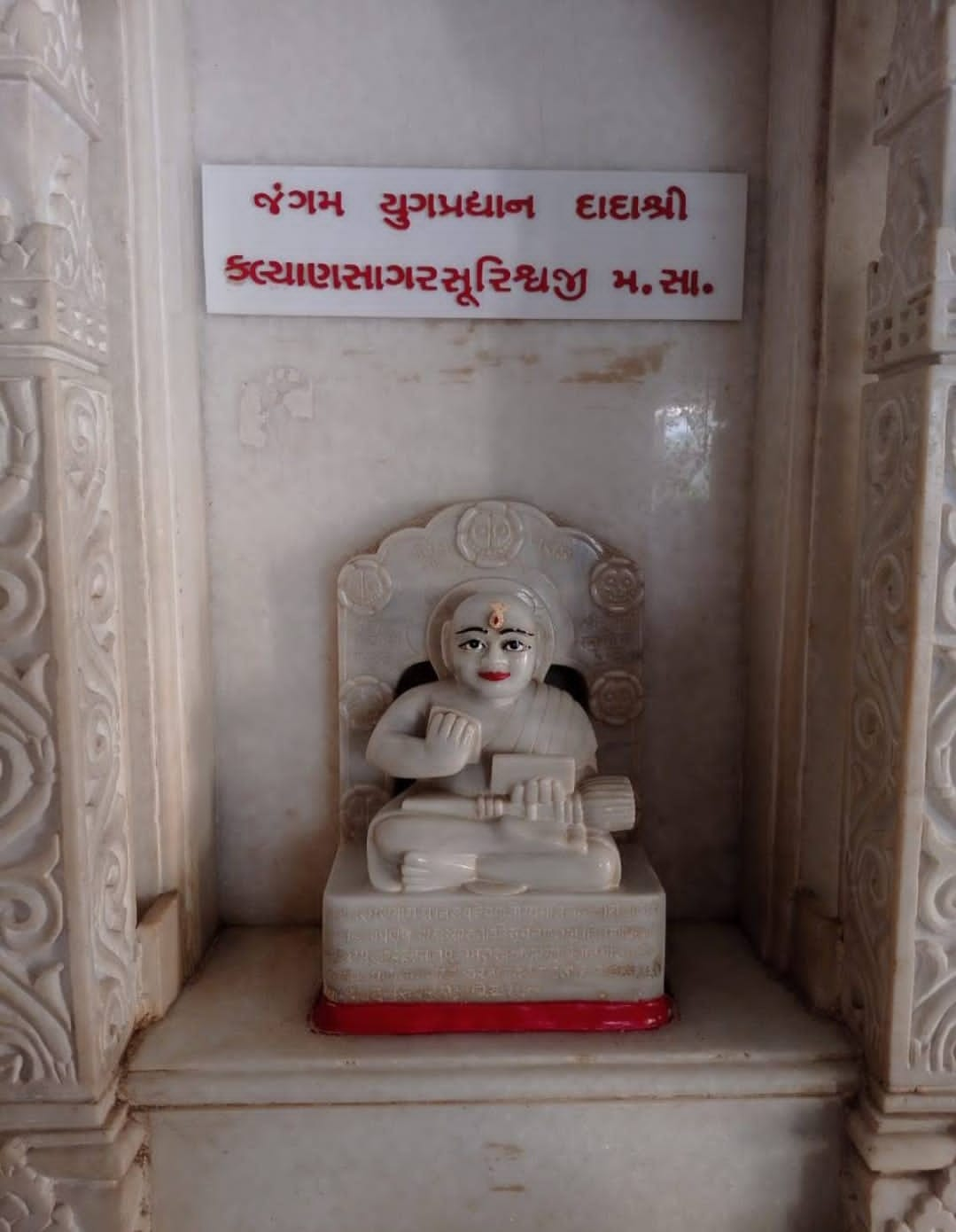
Idol of Kalyansgarsuri at Nallasopara

During his life and after, he was known given several alternate names and titles by his followers and disciples. Alternate names include Kshemasagar, Shubhasagar, Shivodadhisuri, and Shivsindhuraj amongst several other names he was known by. The titles he was given include Jangamtirth, Jagadguru, Yugpradhan, and Yugveer.

== See also ==
- Aryarakshitsuri
- Ratnaprabhasuri
- Kalapurnasuri
