= Tiloya Panatti =

Information
- Religion: Jainism
- Author: Yativrshabha
- Language: Prakrit
- Period: 4th century CE

Tiloya Panatti or Trilokaprajnapati is one of the earlier Prakrit texts on Jain cosmology composed by Acharya Yativrshabha.

== The subject matter ==
Jain cosmology has a unique perception of the Universe. It perceives different solar and lunar entities in a manner that is different from the current cosmology as well those put forward by different cultures. According to Jain cosmology, this universe is an uncreated entity existing since beginningless time. The Universe is made up of what Jains call six dravya or reals or substances – Living beings, non-living things or matter, space, time and the principles of motion and rest. The universe itself is divided abode of gods, abode of humans and animals, and abode of hellish beings.

== Contents ==
The Tiloya Panatti is a Prakrit work in the Jain Shauraseni dialect and has been composed primarily in the Arya metre. The work has a total of 5677 verses divided into 9 chapters. The chapter scheme is as under:

1. The Entire Universe (Loka)
2. The World of Hells (Naraka)
3. The World of Mansion-dwelling demigods (Bhuvanavasi)
4. The World of Humans (Manushya)
5. The World of Sub-human species – plants, animals, insects, etc. (Tiryanca)
6. The World of Peripatetic demigods
7. The World of Light
8. The World of Heavens
9. The World of the Siddhas – the liberated ones (Siddhashila)

== The Language and style ==
The Jain Shauraseni used in this work would seem to suggest that this work predates the Western recensions of the Agamas that took place in Valabhi in the 6th century CE. In addition to cosmology, this work sheds light on Jain dogmatics, culture, history, mythology and ascetic lineages. Of the 5677 gathas, most are in the Arya metre, but other metres such as Shardulavikridita, Vasantatilaka, Indravajra, Dodhaka, Svagata and Malini have also been used. Apart from the gathas, there are several long passages in prose.

== The authorship ==
Acharya Yativrshabha authored the Tiloya Panatti in 604-605 CE. He is known for his important commentary on the Kasayapahuda, (Treatise on Passions), which is dated in the early centuries of the Common Era. Hence it is speculated that Acharya Yativrshabha belonged to 4-5th century CE.

== See also ==
- Jain Agamas
