= Gaccha =

Order of followers of the Murtipujaka Śvetāmbara sect of Jainism

Gaccha, alternatively spelled as Gachchha, is a monastic order, along with lay followers, of the idol worshipping Murtipujaka Śvetāmbara sect of Jainism.

== Etymology ==
Gaccha literally means "who travel together".

== History ==
According to Jain tradition, in the first century, Vajrasensuri established four Kulas, subdivisions within the Swetambara Murtipujaka Jain community, to divide the community during time of drought to disperse them. They were: Chandra, Nirvriti, Vidyadhar and Nagendra. During 1000 to 1300 CE, the Gaccha replaced these Kula as basic divisions of community.

Although some 84 separate gacchas have appeared since the 7th–8th century, only a few have survived, such as the Kharatara, the Tapa, the Achal, the Paichand or Parshwachandra Gaccha. While the gacchas do not differ from one another in matters of doctrine, they do differ on issues of practice, in particular those practices relating to the sacred calendar and to ritual. The various gacchas also trace their descent through different lineages.

=== Former 84 Gacchas ===
The number of 84 Gacchas is still spoken of by the Jains, but the lists that have been hitherto published are very discordant. The Upkeśa Gaccha is, historically, the oldest of all. It is also the only one of the 84 gacchas that follows the lineage of Parshvanatha. The rest follow the lineage of Mahavira. The following was obtained from a member of the sect as being their recognized list,--and allowing for differences of spelling, nearly every name may be recognized in those previously published by Mr. H. G. Briggs or Colonel Miles.

The eighty four gacchas of the Jains:

1. ? *†
2. Upkeśa*†
3. Achal Gaccha
4. Jirâvalâ*†
5. Khaḍatara or Kharatara
6. Lonkâ or Richmati*†
7. Tapa Gaccha
8. Gaṁgeśvara*†
9. Koraṇṭavâla†
10. Ânandapura†
11. Bharavalî
12. Uḍhavîyâ*†
13. Gudâvâ*†
14. Dekâüpâ or Dekâwâ*†
15. Bh nmâlâ†
16. Mahuḍîyâ*†
17. Gachhapâla*†
18. Goshavâla†
19. Magatragagadâ†
20. Vṛihmânîyâ†
21. Tâlârâ*†
22. Vîkaḍîyâ*†
23. Muñjhîyâ*†
24. Chitroḍâ†
25. Sâchorâ*†
26. Jachaṇḍîyâ†
27. Sîdhâlavâ*†
28. Mîyâṇṇîyâ
29. Âgamîyâ†
30. Maladhârî*†
31. Bhâvarîyâ†
32. Palîvâla*†
33. Nâgadîgeśvara†
34. Dharmaghosha†
35. Nâgapurâ*†
36. Uchatavâla†
37. Nâṇṇâvâla*†
38. Sâḍerâ*†
39. Maṇḍovarâ*†
40. Śurâṇî*†
41. Khaṁbhâvatî*†
42. Pâëchaṁda
43. Sopârîyâ*†
44. Mâṇḍalîyâ*†
45. Kochhîpanâ*†
46. Jâgaṁna*†
47. Lâparavâla*†
48. Vosaraḍâ*†
49. Düîvaṅdanîyâ*†
50. Chitrâvâla*†
51. Vegaḍâ
52. Vâpaḍâ
53. Vîjaharâ, Vîjharâ*†
54. Kâüpurî†
55. Kâchala
56. Haṁdalîyâ†
57. Mahukarâ†
58. Putaliyâ*†
59. Kaṁnarîsey†
60. Revarḍi̐yâ*†
61. Dhandhukâ†
62. Thaṁbhanîpaṇâ*
63. Paṁchîvâla†
64. Pâlaṇpurâ*
65. Gaṁdhârîyâ*†
66. Velîyâ†
67. Sâḍhapunamîyâ
68. Nagarakoṭîyâ*†
69. Hâsorâ*†
70. Bhaṭanerâ*†
71. Jaṇaharâ*†
72. Jagâyana*
73. Bhîmasena*†
74. Takaḍîyâ†
75. Kaṁboja*†
76. Senatâ†
77. Vagherâ*†
78. Vaheḍîyâ*
79. Siddhapura*†
80. Ghogharî*†
81. Nîgamîyâ
82. Punamîyâ
83. Varhaḍîyâ†
84. Nâmîlâ.†

=== Present Gacchas ===
Tapa Gaccha was founded by Jagatchandrasuri in Vikram Samvat 1285 (1229 CE). He was given the title of "Tapa" (i.e., the meditative one) by the ruler of Mewar. It was a branch of the Brihad Gaccha founded by Udyotan Suri. Vijaydevsuri (1600–1657 AD) is considered one of major leader of lineage. They reformed monastic order of Śvetāmbara Jainism. As a result of this reform, most Śvetāmbara Jain monks today belong to Tapa Gaccha.

Kharatara Gaccha was founded by Vardhamana Suri (till 1031). His teacher was a temple-dwelling monk. He rejected him because of not following texts. His pupil, Jineshvara, got honorary title 'Kharatara' (Sharp witted or Fierce) because he defeated Suracharya, leader of Chaityavasis in public debate in 1023 at Anahilvada Patan. So the Gaccha got his title. Another tradition regards Jinadatta Suri (1075-1154) as a founder of Gaccha.

Achal Gaccha, also known as the Vidhipakṣa or Anchal Gaccha (Hindi: अचलगच्छ or अंचलगच्छ) is one of the four existing Gacchas and one of the 84 gacchas of the Śvetāmbara Murtipujaka sect of Jainism. It was founded by Acharya Aryarakshitsuri in 1079 CE.Currently, Acharya Kalāprabhasāgarsuri is the gacchadhipati of Achal Gaccha who was declared as Gunodayasāgarsuri's successor after his demise in 2020. Acharya Kalāprabhasāgarsuri was formally crowned as the gacchadhipati of Achal Gaccha in 2022 in Mulund.

Other gaccha is Parshwachandra Gaccha.

Presiding deities

Adhishthayak Deva or presiding deities are protector deities of followers of each Gaccha. They are as follows: Manibhadra Vira of Tapa Gaccha; Ambika and Bhairava of Khartara Gaccha; Kalika and Chakreshvari of Achal Gaccha; Nakoda Batuk Bhairava of Parshwachandra Gaccha.

== See also ==
Murtipujaka
