= Yativṛṣabha =

6th-century Jain monk and mathematician

- Jadivasaha

Personal life
- Born: est. 6th century CE Indian subcontinent
- Died: around the end of 6th century CE
- Notable work(s): Author of the Tiloyapannatti, which postulated different concepts about infinity.

Religious life
- Religion: Jainism
- Sect: Digambara
- Profession: Prakrit mathematician

Yativṛṣabha (Yativrishabha), also known as Jadivasaha, was a mathematician and Jain monk. He is believed to have lived during the 6th century, probably during 500–570. He studied under Arya Manksu and Nagahastin. He lived and worked between the periods of two great Indian mathematicians, Aryabhata (476 – 550) and Brahmagupta (598-668).

== Works ==
He compiled many works in Prakrit expounding Jain traditions. One of these, the Tiloyapannatti — a description of the universe and its parts, is of some importance to historians of Indian science because it incorporates formulas representative of developments in Jain mathematics between the older canonical works and the later texts of the ninth and following centuries. He wrote the book named Tiloyapannatti which describes cosmology from the point of view of Jain religion and philosophy. "The work also gives various units for measuring distances and time." Tiloya Panatti postulated different concepts about infinity. His work also describes the construction of the Universe expressed in specific numbers; for example, the diameter of the circular Jambu continent, upon which India is located, is 100,000 yojanas and its circumference is 316,227 yojanas, 3 krośas, 128 daṇḍas, 13 aṅgulas, 5 yavas, 1 yūkā, 1 ṛikṣā, 6 karmabhūmivālagras, 7 madhyabhogabhūmivālagras, 5 uttamabhogabhūmivālagras, 1 rathareṇu, 3 trasareṇus, 2 sannāsannas, and 3 avasannāsannas, plus a remainder of 23213/105409.

== See also ==
- List of Indian mathematicians
- Yati

== Sources ==
1. "Yativrsabha - Biography". Maths History.
2. "Yativr?s?abha | Encyclopedia.com". www.encyclopedia.com.
3. Ikeyama, Setsuro (2007), "Yativṛṣabha", in Hockey, Thomas; Trimble, Virginia; Williams, Thomas R.; Bracher, Katherine (eds.), The Biographical Encyclopedia of Astronomers, New York, NY: Springer, p. 1251, doi:10.1007/978-0-387-30400-7_1513, ISBN 978-0-387-30400-7
