= Aryarakshitsuri =

Indian Jain ascetic (1080–1180)

Acharya Aryarakshitsuri Maharaj Saheb
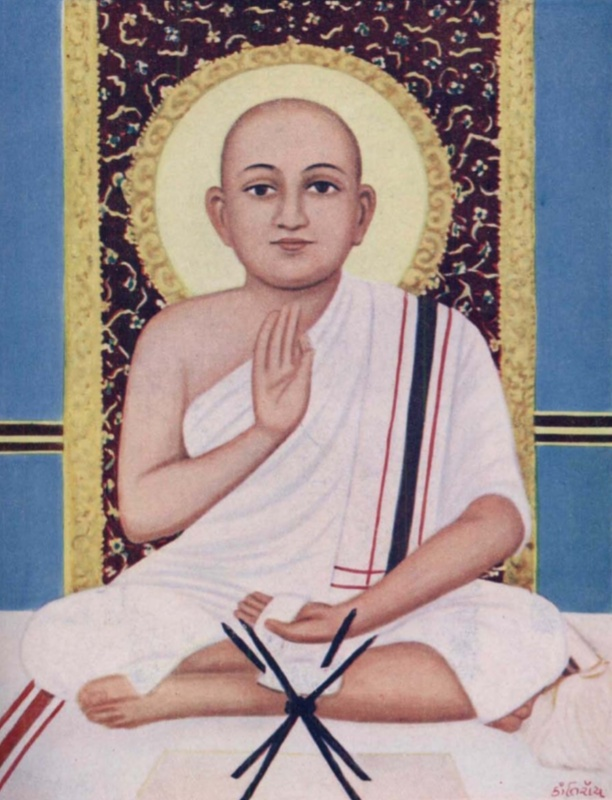
- A representative image of Aryarakshitsuri

Personal life
- Born: Vayja Kumar; 1080 CE Dantani, Rajasthan
- Died: 1180 CE Benap, Banas Kantha, Gujarat
- Parents: Drona (father); Dedi (mother)

Religious life
- Religion: Jainism
- Sect: Śvetāmbara
- Initiation: by Acharya Jaysinghsuri

Aryarakshitsuri (c. 1080 CE—1180 CE) was a Śvetāmbara Jain monk and the founder of the Achal Gaccha of the Śvetāmbara sect of Jainism. He was a contemporary of Hemchandrasuri and is said to have met him.

== Early life ==
He was born as Vayja Kumar to Dedi and Dron in the Pragwat community in a small village Dantani near Mount Abu, Rajasthan, India on 9th day of bright half of Shravan month in 1080 CE. He also had a younger brother named Solha.

== Initiation ==
At the age of 6, on the 8th day of bright half of Vaishakh month in 1086 CE, Vayja Kumar was initiated as a Jain monk by Acharya Jaysinghsuri at Dantani, his birth place. He was named as Muni Vijayachandra by his preceptor Acharya Jaysinghsuri. After his initiation as a Jain monk, he studied Jain Aagams, Sanskrit and Prakrit grammar, poetries, law theories, prosody, lexicography, and philosophy under the guidance of his preceptor. He also learned different mantras, hymns, and other meditation techniques from Acharya Jaysinghsuri's disciple Rajchandra. He was consecrated as an Acharya at the age of 23 years in 1069 CE on the 3rd day of bright half of the Magshirsh month, and was renamed as Acharya Vijayachandrasuri.

== Criticism of lax monastic practices ==
=== Realization ===
Once, while revising the Daśavaikālika Sutra, one of the 45 canonical scriptures of the Śvetāmbaras, he came across a stanza which stated that a Jain monk must not touch or drink water that is not boiled. He wondered about the reason this was not being practiced as unboiled water was being used by monks then. The Jain Sangha was under a strong influence of yatis, and consequently lax monasticism was being practiced by several Jain monks. He decided to clarify his queries by asking his preceptor. Upon hearing Vijaychandrasuri's doubt, Jaysinghsuri responded by saying that a Jain monk is indeed disallowed from drinking or touching unboiled water. He also mentioned that this was due to unfavorable times, which made following the directions laid in the scriptures difficult. Vijayachandrasuri was unsatisfied by this response and further asked his preceptor about the result of following the scriptures and giving up the lax conduct. The preceptor responded that such a monk is considered venerable by everyone. After getting permission from Jaysinghsuri, Vijayachandrasuri decided to reestablish the true path. Upon Jaysinghsuri's insistence, he gave up the title of Acharya and retained the status of an Upadhyaya.

=== Guidance and separation from Jaysinghsuri ===
Vijayachandra sought guidance from Jaysinghsuri to perform a Kriyoddhāra (major reforms to eliminate lax monastic practices). Jaysinghsuri advised him to understand the Śvetāmbara canon completely before doing so. With Jaysinghsuri's permission, Vijayachandra and a few other monks who also wanted to reestablish the correct monastic conduct for Jain monks decided to wander separately from Jaysinghsuri.

=== Encounter with monks of Poornima Gaccha ===
While roaming for Kriyoddhāra, Vijayachandra met Acharya Shilgunsuri of Poornima Gaccha. Before initiation, Shilgunsuri was Vijayachandra's maternal uncle. Vijaychandra decided to stay with Shilgunsuri to learn scriptures and perform the ritual of Kriyoddhāra. Shilgunsuri taught him the Śvetāmbara canon and insisted him to accept consecration as an acharya in the order of Poornima Gaccha. However, Vijayachandra declined the offer and separated from Poornima Gaccha.

== Kriyoddhāra (Reforms in monastic practices) ==
=== Resolution to perform Sallekhana ===
Upadhyaya Vijayachandra visited the Mahavira temple atop the Pavagadh Hill and resolved to perform Sallekhana beginning with Māsakṣaman, a month-long fast, if he failed to make impactful reforms in monasticism as prescribed by the Śvetāmbara canon.

=== Encounter with Chakreshvari ===
Legend has it that once, demi-goddess Chakreshvari asked Tirthankara Simandhara, who is currently believed to be living in Mahavideha, if there was an ascetic in the Bharata Kṣetra who was closest to following the practices prescribed in the Śvetāmbara canon. To this, Simandhara had replied that Upadhyaya Vijayachandra would fit this description and that he was performing Sallekhana at Pavagadh. He also mentioned that Upadhyaya Vijayachandra would establish the Vidhi Pakṣa in future. Upon hearing this, Chakreshvari decided to visit Vijayachandra to request him to not perform Sallekhna. She mentioned her conversation with Simandhara and that a lay follower named Yashodhana would come to the Jain temples at Pavagadh and also offer him alms suitable to a Jain ascetic. She added that Yashodhana would also become his first lay follower. Yashodhana arrived at Pavagadh with the Chaturvidha Jain Sangha (four-fold congregation). After worshipping the idols and paying homage to the ascetics, he requested Upadhyaya Vijayachandra to oblige him by accepting food and water from his mobile kitchen that was set up at the foothills of Pavagadh Hill. Vijayachandra accepted his request and broke his month-long fast. Later, Vijayachandra preached Yashodhana and informed him about the ill practices in the monastic conduct of monks due to the influence of yatis. Consequently, Yashodhana and all his family members accepted the 12 vows of a Jain Śrāvaka from Upadhyay Vijayachandra.

=== Encounter with Mahakali ===
Pleased with the conduct and wisdom of Upadhaya Vijayachandra, demi-goddess Mahakali appeared in front of him and promised that she would help followers of Vijayachandra's gaccha. Hence, she is considered as adhishthayika of Achal Gaccha. She also requested him to accept the name Aryarakshitsuri (transl. the one who is protected by the conduct of Aryans (monks) when he becomes an Acharya. Yashodhana and Upadhyaya Vijayachandra visited Bhalej, where he was consecrated as an acharya on the 3rd day of the bright half of Vaishakh month (Akshaya Tritiya) in 1079 CE by his initiator Jaysinghsuri and was given the name Aryarakshitsuri. His lay followers also established the Mahakali Temple atop Pavagadh Hill. The idol of Mahakali was consecrated by Aryarakshitsuri.

=== Establishment of the Vidhi Pakṣa Gaccha (Achal Gaccha) ===
In 1079 CE, he founded the Vidhi Pakṣa Gaccha and Yashodhana became his first lay follower. Several acharyas of other gacchas such as Shankheshwar Gaccha, Nanak Gaccha, Vallabhi Gaccha, Nadol Gaccha, and Binmal Gaccha accepted the practices of Aryarakshitsuri and merged their order into the Vidhi Pakṣa Gaccha. Jhalori Gaccha, Jhadapalliya Gaccha, Aagam Gaccha, Poornima Gaccha, and Sadhupoornima Gaccha partially accepted the practices of the Vidhi Pakṣa Gaccha. Upon the request of the lay followers at Bhalej, Aryarakshitsuri decided to stay in the city during Chaturmasya. Upon completion of the four months, Aryarakshitsuri, along with the lay followers of Bhalej, went on pilgrimage to Palitana. Later, he visited the town of Benap, where he preached Kapardi, a minister of the king Jaysimha Siddhraj. While listening to Aryarakshitsuri's sermon, Kapardi's daughter Somai decided to accept the life of a Jain ascetic and went on to become the first nun of Aryarakshitsuri's order. She was renamed as Sadhvi Samyashreeji.

Legend has it that Jaysimha Siddhraj was performing a Putrakameshti Yajna (a sacrifice to be blessed with a male child) and during the sacrifice, a cow died at the location. As per beliefs and advice of Brahmins, if cow goes out of the location alive, only then the sacrifice is completed. Hence, the king requested Aryarakshitsuri for help. Seeing that it can benefit the Chaturvidha Sangha, Aryarakshitsuri agreed to help. With the help of his magical powers, he entered the cow's dead body and got it out of the location alive. Surprised with the powers Jayasimha Siddharaja renamed the Vidhi Pakṣa Gaccha to Achal Gaccha because Aryarakshitsuri stayed 'achal' (transl. firm) on his words.

An alternate story says that once, minister Kapardi performed Guru Vandan to Hemachandrasuri in Kumarapala's court by cleaning the floor with his clothes. Amazed by this method of paying homage to a monk, Kumarapala asked Hemachandra about its authenticity and mention in aagamas. Hemachandra confirmed that it was indeed a correct method as per the scriptures. After this incident, Kumarapala gave another named to Vidhi Pakṣa Gaccha and called it "Anchal Gaccha".

In 1154 CE, Hameer, the king of Ratanpur, and his son Jesangde, along with their family, accepted the 12 vows of Śrāvaka from Aryarakshitsuri. Jesangde had two other names "Sakhatsangh" and "Malde". His descendants can be identified with surname "Malde" in the Oswal community. Apart from that, the ancestors of Sahashguna-Gandhi and Vadera clan were disciples of Aryarakshitsuri.

Numerous legends such as that of king Mahipal of Parkar are associated with him.

== Disciples of Achal Gaccha ==
There were a total of 3,517 ascetics in Aryarakshitsuri's order. Out of these, 2,202 were monks, and 1,302 were nuns. Jaysinghsuri, one of the 2,202 disciples of Aryarakshitsuri, was chosen to lead the order after Aryarakshitsuri. Jaysinghsuri was initiated as a monk by Aryarakshitsuri in 1137 CE in the town of Tharad.

== Death ==
Aryarakshitsuri died in 1180 CE at the age of 100 by performing Sallekhana in the town of Benap in Banaskantha district of Gujarat.

== See also ==
- Rajendrasuri
- Ratnaprabhasuri
- Vijayanandsuri
