= Muhapatti =

Jainist religious face covering

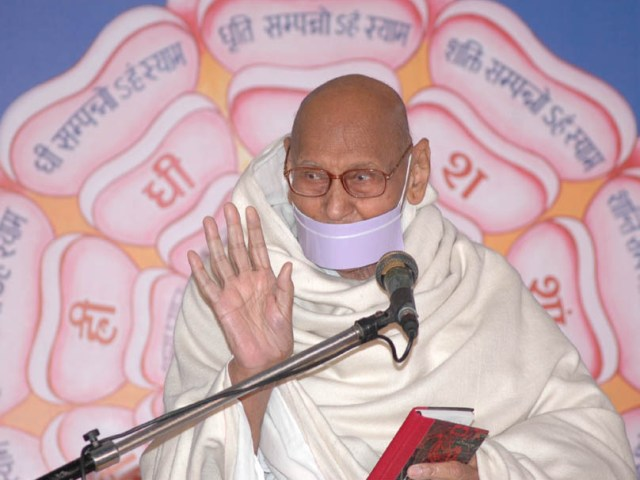
Acharya Mahapragya, wearing a muhapatti

The muhapatti (variously spelled mahapatti, muhpatti or mahpatti) is a square of white cloth worn across the face and tied behind the ears or held, by Sthanakvasi Śvetāmbara or Śvētāmbara Terapanthi Jains. Sometimes a card is used instead of a cloth.

The purpose is to prevent saliva from coming into contact with sacred books, images or other items. It is often purported to be worn to reduce the chance of inhaling (and thus killing) small insects and other airborne life. Some Jains believe the destruction of even these tiny life forms is a violation of ahimsa, the principle of non-violence. Whilst this may be one benefit of the use of muhapatti, it is not the initial reason for use. It is one of the accessories of sadhu in the practise of Dharma. It is one of many "health-giving concepts" woven into the Jain belief system. Murtipujaka monks and nuns also use the muhapatti when delivering a religious discourse.

The muhapatti is also viewed as a symbol of samyama, or "control of speech". It is described as a religious accessory with a long history, used by Indrabhuti Gautama, a ganadhara, according to the canonical text Vipâka sûtra, adhyayana 1.
