= Murtipujaka =

Sub-tradition of Svetambara Jainism

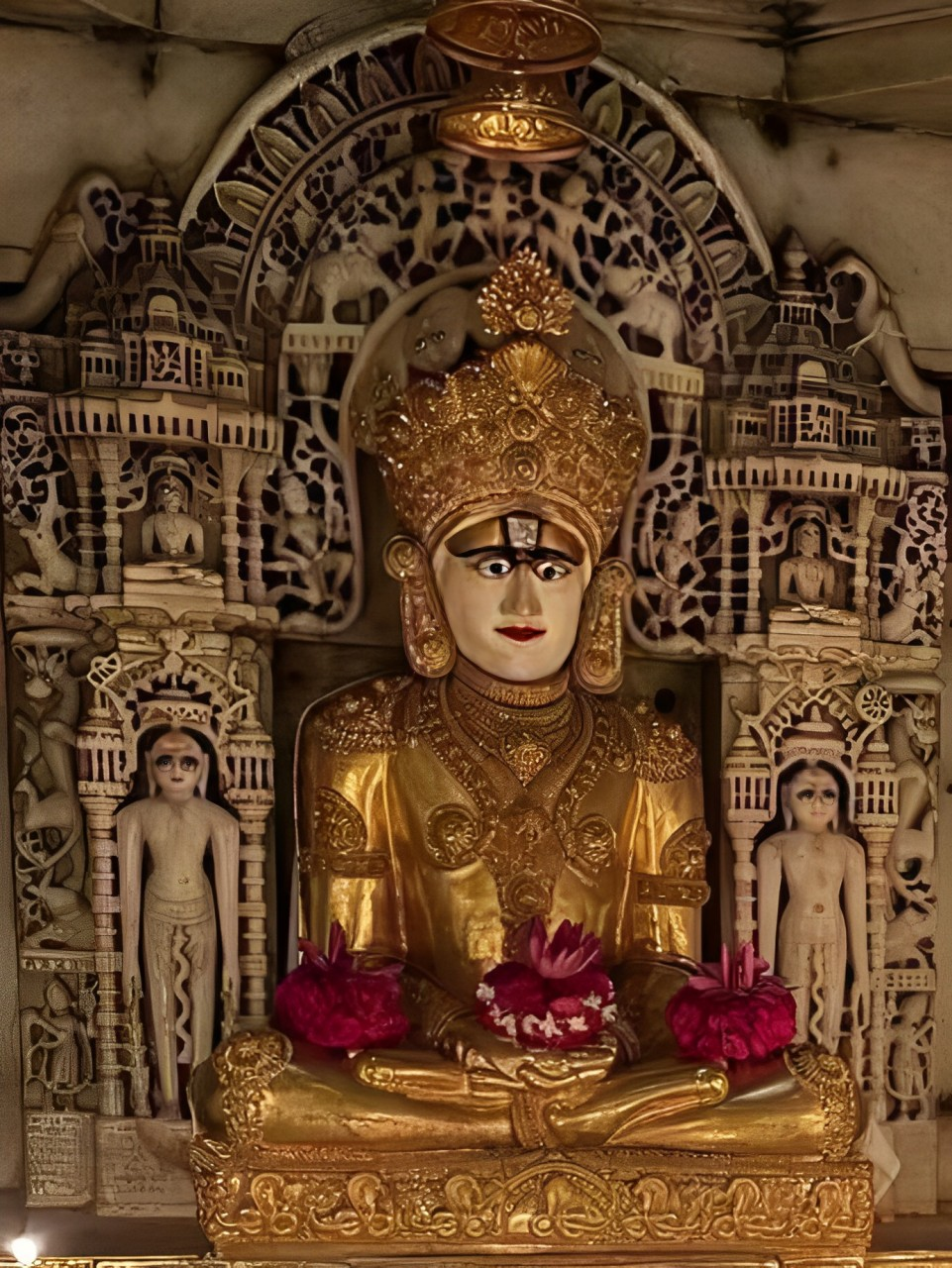
Murtipujaka Parshvanatha iconography

Mūrtipūjaka (lit. "image-worshipper"), also known as Derāvāsī ("temple-dweller") or Mandir Mārgī ("follower of the temple path"), is the largest sect of Śvetāmbara Jainism. Mūrtipūjaka Jains differ from both Śvetāmbara Sthānakavāsī and Śvetāmbara Terāpanthī Jains in that they worship images of the Tīrthaṅkaras. Mūrtipūjaka may also generally describe members of both the Śvetāmbara and Digambara traditions who use idols (mūrti) in their worship (pūjā).

== Agreements and disagreements ==
According to Nalini Balbir, all Śvetāmbara sects agree upon "the authority of the Śvetāmbara canonical scriptures, with slight differences; claims of monastic descent from Sudharman, except for the Upakeśa Gaccha; [and] white monastic robes [for] monks and nuns." However, despite these commonalities, a central division exists between each of the sects as related to the use of images in worship.

The early Jain reformer Loṅkā Śāh used the term "mūrtipūjaka" to classify an image-worshipping Jain from other kinds. Loṅkā is generally presented in his biographies as a scribe who lived in the Gujarat region during the 15th century. His occupation allowed him access to many Jain scriptures and manuscripts, which he interpreted to lack references to the construction of temples or the worship of images, despite both being prevalent at the time and also idols belonging to the time of Lord Mahavira being worshiped. He argued that these practices were spiritually dangerous by grounding them as violations of ahiṃsā, the principle of non-injury central to Jain religion and philosophy. According to Loṅkā, re-shaping the land to build temples leads to the destruction of microscopic organisms, and pūjā rituals entail "subtle forms of harm" through material offerings like flowers or incense.

Loṅkā's lasting influence brought to light an aniconic impulse within a strict, doctrinal understanding of Jain teaching. The Śvetāmbara Sthānakavāsī and Terāpanthī sects accept this impulse, agreeing with Loṅkā that the most appropriate form of religious practice is mental worship (bhāva-pūjā), which is already performed by mendicants because the reliance on images and temples is indicative of an attachment to objects that is "spiritually counterproductive".

Mūrtipūjaka Jains respond to the criticisms of mūrti-pūjā in two ways: first, by revealing that it is, in fact, scripturally prevalent; and second, by saying that images are necessary for the spiritual practices of laypeople. The monk Ātmārām (1837 – 1896), who was originally a Śvetāmbara Sthānakavāsī monk and later became the mendicant leader Ācārya Vijayānandasūri, discovered upon reading early Jain texts in Prakrit and their Sanskrit commentaries that there was an abundance of references to image worship. This led him to believe that the non-Mūrtipūjaka position actually "contravened Jain scripture".

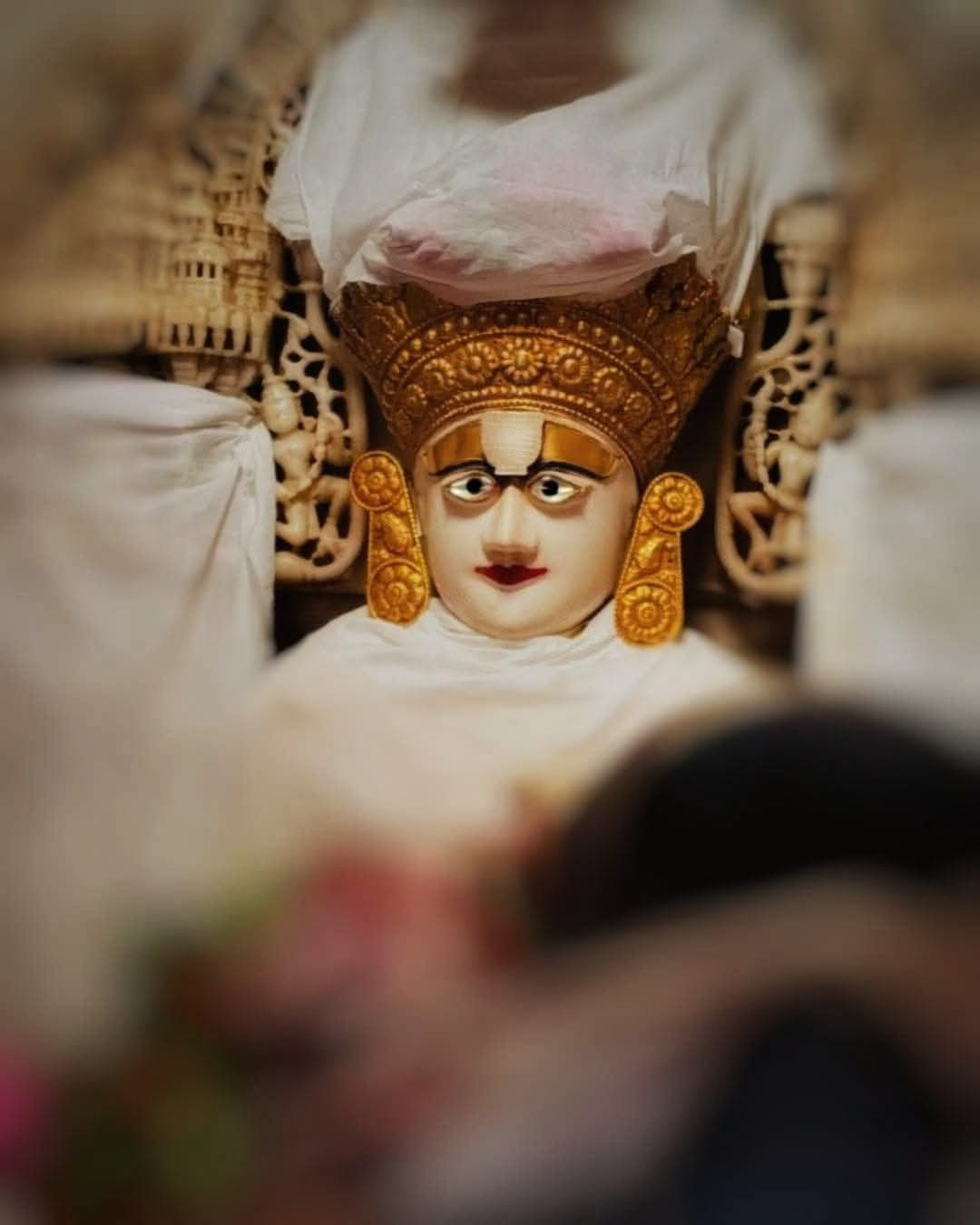
The idol of Parshvanatha at Shankheshwar, Patan, Gujarat

Muni Bhadraṅkaravijaya considered image worship to cultivate morality by praising the qualities of the Tīrthaṅkaras and undergoing the ascetic practices associated with them. As such, given its disciplinary nature, "image worship will destroy a wide variety of karmas." Bhadraṅkaravijaya also argued that given the current cosmic age, laity can't contemplate the Tīrthaṅkaras without the assistance of some mental prop or image. Thus, a key element of the Mūrtipūjaka response to the controversy of image worship is to view images as a tool to develop better spiritual practices, especially amongst the laity.

== Other distinctions ==
Outside the use of images in worship, Śvetāmbara Mūrtipūjaka Jains distinguish themselves in the use of the muhpattī. The muhpattī is a small, rectangular piece of cloth placed over the mouth, traditionally used to prevent harming small organisms either by inhaling them or expelling breath onto them. Mūrtipūjaka mendicants, according to Paul Dundas, they will simply hold it in place when necessary in situations such as reading of scriptures. In contrast, Śvetāmbara Sthānakavāsī and Terāpanthī mendicants permanently wear the muhpattī except while eating. Laypeople will hold a similar cloth in front of their mouths during certain rituals, where it is intended to "prevent pollution of the sacred objects by [the laity's] breath." However, Kristi Wiley notes that this is actually a different cloth from the muhpattī.

== Gacchas ==
Derived from the word for "tree" - or as Wiley also suggests, a derivation of the terms "going" or "traveling together" - Śvetāmbara Mūrtipūjaka mendicants are divided into orders based on their pupillary lineages known as gacchas. Emerging between the 11th and 16th centuries, each of the gacchas claimed to represent a "truer" version of Jainism than another, and they often hotly contested one another in polemical debates and writings that argued against the laxity of mendicant regulations. Despite this, each of the gacchas shared a common ancestor, their respective records tracing back to the Tīrthaṅkara Mahāvīra's disciple, Sudharman. Although some 84 separate gacchas appeared since the 7th–8th century, and are still spoken of, only the following seem to have survived:

- Tapā Gaccha (1228 CE)
- Kharatara Gaccha (simply traced to 11th century CE)
- Achal Gaccha (dated at 1179 CE)
- Paichand or Parshwachandra Gaccha (dated ?)

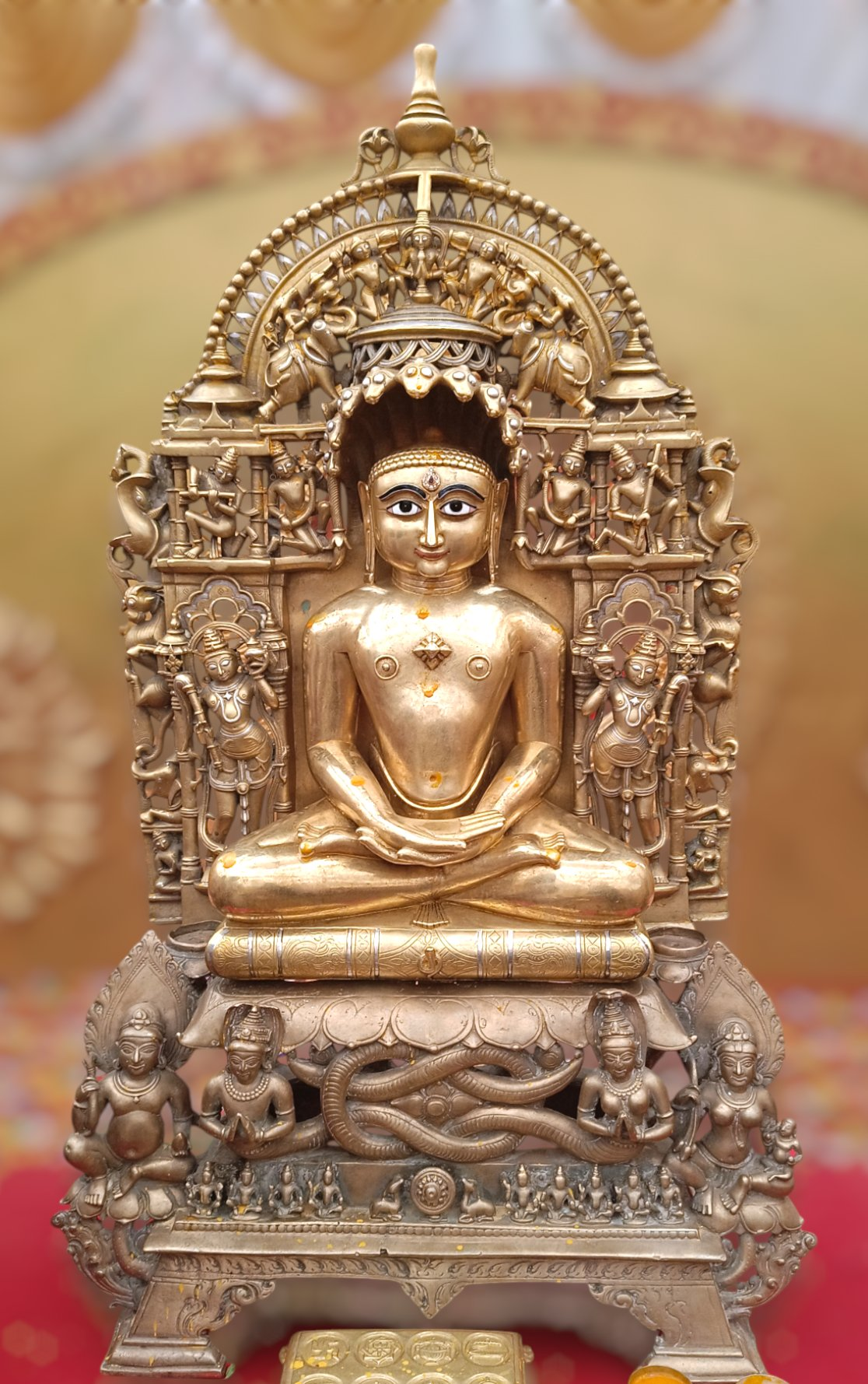
A 10th century CE Murtipujaka idol of Parshvanatha from Patan, Gujarat

As previously mentioned, the Upakeśa Gaccha is also identified as a Śvetāmbara sect which eventually died out during the end of the medieval era. Unlike the orders listed above, they claim descent from the 23rd Tīrthaṅkara Pārśvanātha. According to Flügel, some Upakeśa Gaccha scholars like Devagupta Sūri considered "injury to living beings committed during the construction of temples and in the preparation of pūjā with flowers, fruits and water as a form of unavoidable or occupational violence (ārambhajā himsā)." In this sense, they are congruent with other Mūrtipūjaka sects and their beliefs in that some forms of violence are permissible, or at least outweighed, by the value of temples and pūjā rituals.

== History ==
According to Jain tradition, in the first century, Vajrasensuri established four Kulas, subdivisions within the Swetambara Murtipujaka Jain community, to divide the community during time of drought to disperse them. They were: Chandra, Nirvriti, Vidyadhar and Nagendra. During 1000 to 1300 CE, the Gaccha replaced these Kula as basic divisions of community.

Although some 84 separate gacchas have appeared since the 7th–8th century, only a few have survived, such as the Kharatara, the Tapa, the Achal, the Paichand or Parshwachandra Gaccha. While the gacchas do not differ from one another in matters of doctrine, they do differ on issues of practice, in particular those practices relating to the sacred calendar and to ritual. The various gacchas also trace their descent through different lineages.

=== Former 84 Gacchas ===
The number of 84 Gacchas is still spoken of by the Jains, but the lists that have been hitherto published are very discordant. The Upkeśa Gaccha is, historically, the oldest of all. It is also the only one of the 84 gacchas that follows the lineage of Parshvanatha. The rest follow the lineage of Mahavira. The following was obtained from a member of the sect as being their recognized list,--and allowing for differences of spelling, nearly every name may be recognized in those previously published by Mr. H. G. Briggs or Colonel Miles.

The eighty four gacchas of the Jains:

1. ? *†
2. Upkeśa*†
3. Achal Gaccha
4. Jirâvalâ*†
5. Khaḍatara or Kharatara
6. Lonkâ or Richmati*†
7. Tapa Gaccha
8. Gaṁgeśvara*†
9. Koraṇṭavâla†
10. Ânandapura†
11. Bharavalî
12. Uḍhavîyâ*†
13. Gudâvâ*†
14. Dekâüpâ or Dekâwâ*†
15. Bh nmâlâ†
16. Mahuḍîyâ*†
17. Gachhapâla*†
18. Goshavâla†
19. Magatragagadâ†
20. Vṛihmânîyâ†
21. Tâlârâ*†
22. Vîkaḍîyâ*†
23. Muñjhîyâ*†
24. Chitroḍâ†
25. Sâchorâ*†
26. Jachaṇḍîyâ†
27. Sîdhâlavâ*†
28. Mîyâṇṇîyâ
29. Âgamîyâ†
30. Maladhârî*†
31. Bhâvarîyâ†
32. Palîvâla*†
33. Nâgadîgeśvara†
34. Dharmaghosha†
35. Nâgapurâ*†
36. Uchatavâla†
37. Nâṇṇâvâla*†
38. Sâḍerâ*†
39. Maṇḍovarâ*†
40. Śurâṇî*†
41. Khaṁbhâvatî*†
42. Pâëchaṁda
43. Sopârîyâ*†
44. Mâṇḍalîyâ*†
45. Kochhîpanâ*†
46. Jâgaṁna*†
47. Lâparavâla*†
48. Vosaraḍâ*†
49. Düîvaṅdanîyâ*†
50. Chitrâvâla*†
51. Vegaḍâ
52. Vâpaḍâ
53. Vîjaharâ, Vîjharâ*†
54. Kâüpurî†
55. Kâchala
56. Haṁdalîyâ†
57. Mahukarâ†
58. Putaliyâ*†
59. Kaṁnarîsey†
60. Revarḍi̐yâ*†
61. Dhandhukâ†
62. Thaṁbhanîpaṇâ*
63. Paṁchîvâla†
64. Pâlaṇpurâ*
65. Gaṁdhârîyâ*†
66. Velîyâ†
67. Sâḍhapunamîyâ
68. Nagarakoṭîyâ*†
69. Hâsorâ*†
70. Bhaṭanerâ*†
71. Jaṇaharâ*†
72. Jagâyana*
73. Bhîmasena*†
74. Takaḍîyâ†
75. Kaṁboja*†
76. Senatâ†
77. Vagherâ*†
78. Vaheḍîyâ*
79. Siddhapura*†
80. Ghogharî*†
81. Nîgamîyâ
82. Punamîyâ
83. Varhaḍîyâ†
84. Nâmîlâ.†

=== Present Gacchas ===
Tapa Gaccha was founded by Jagatchandrasuri in Vikram Samvat 1285 (1229 CE). He was given the title of "Tapa" (i.e., the meditative one) by the ruler of Mewar. It was a branch of the Brihad Gaccha founded by Udyotan Suri. Vijaydevsuri (1600–1657 AD) is considered one of major leader of lineage. They reformed monastic order of Śvetāmbara Jainism. As a result of this reform, most Śvetāmbara Jain monks today belong to Tapa Gaccha.

Kharatara Gaccha was founded by Vardhamana Suri (till 1031). His teacher was a temple-dwelling monk. He rejected him because of not following texts. His pupil, Jineshvara, got honorary title 'Kharatara' (Sharp witted or Fierce) because he defeated Suracharya, leader of Chaityavasis in public debate in 1023 at Anahilvada Patan. So the Gaccha got his title. Another tradition regards Jinadatta Suri (1075-1154) as a founder of Gaccha.

Achal Gaccha, also known as the Vidhipakṣa or Anchal Gaccha (Hindi: अचलगच्छ or अंचलगच्छ) is one of the four existing Gacchas and one of the 84 gacchas of the Śvetāmbara Murtipujaka sect of Jainism. It was founded by Acharya Aryarakshitsuri in 1079 CE.Currently, Acharya Kalāprabhasāgarsuri is the gacchadhipati of Achal Gaccha who was declared as Gunodayasāgarsuri's successor after his demise in 2020. Acharya Kalāprabhasāgarsuri was formally crowned as the gacchadhipati of Achal Gaccha in 2022 in Mulund.

Other gaccha is Parshwachandra Gaccha.

== Annual festivals ==
The Svetambara Murtipujak annual festivals, according to the Gujarati calendar, are:

- Kārtak (October-November)
  - Bright 1: New Year / Gautam Svāmī Enlightenment
  - Bright 5: Knowledge Fifth (Jñān Pañcamī)
  - Bright 5: Wealth Fifth (Lābh Pañcamī)
  - Bright 14: Four-monthly Fourteenth (Kārtak Caudaś)
  - Bright 15: Kārtak Full Moon (Kārtak Pūnam)
- Māgsar (November-December)
  - Bright 11: Silence Eleventh (Maun Agyāras)
  - Dark 10: Poṣ Tenth (Poṣ Daśami)
- Poṣ (December-January)
- Māgh (January-February)
- Fāgan (February-March)
  - Bright 14: Four-monthly Fourteenth (Fāgan Caudaś)
  - Dark 8: Beginning of Varṣītap
- Caitra (March-April)
  - Bright 7-15: Āyambil Oḷī
  - Bright 13: Mahāvīr Jayantī
- Vaiśākh (April-May)
  - Bright 3: Immortal Third (Akhā Trīj)
- Jeṭh (May-June)
- Āṣāḍh (June-July)
  - Bright 14: Four-monthly Fourteenth (Aṣāḍh Caudaś)
  - Bright 15: Beginning of Comāsu
- Śrāvan (July-August)
  - Dark 12/13: Beginning of Paryuṣaṇ
- Bhādarvā (August-September)
  - Bright 4/5: Saṃvatsarī
- Āso (September-October)
  - Bright 7-15: Āyambil Oḷī
  - Dark 13: Wealth Thirteenth (Dhan Teras)
  - Dark 14: Black Fourteenth (Kāḷī Caudaś)
  - Dark 15: Dīvāḷī / Accountbook Worship / Mahāvīr Liberation
