= Mahakali =

Goddess in Hinduism and Buddhism

- Mother Goddess; Goddess of Time and Death
- Member of the Matrikas
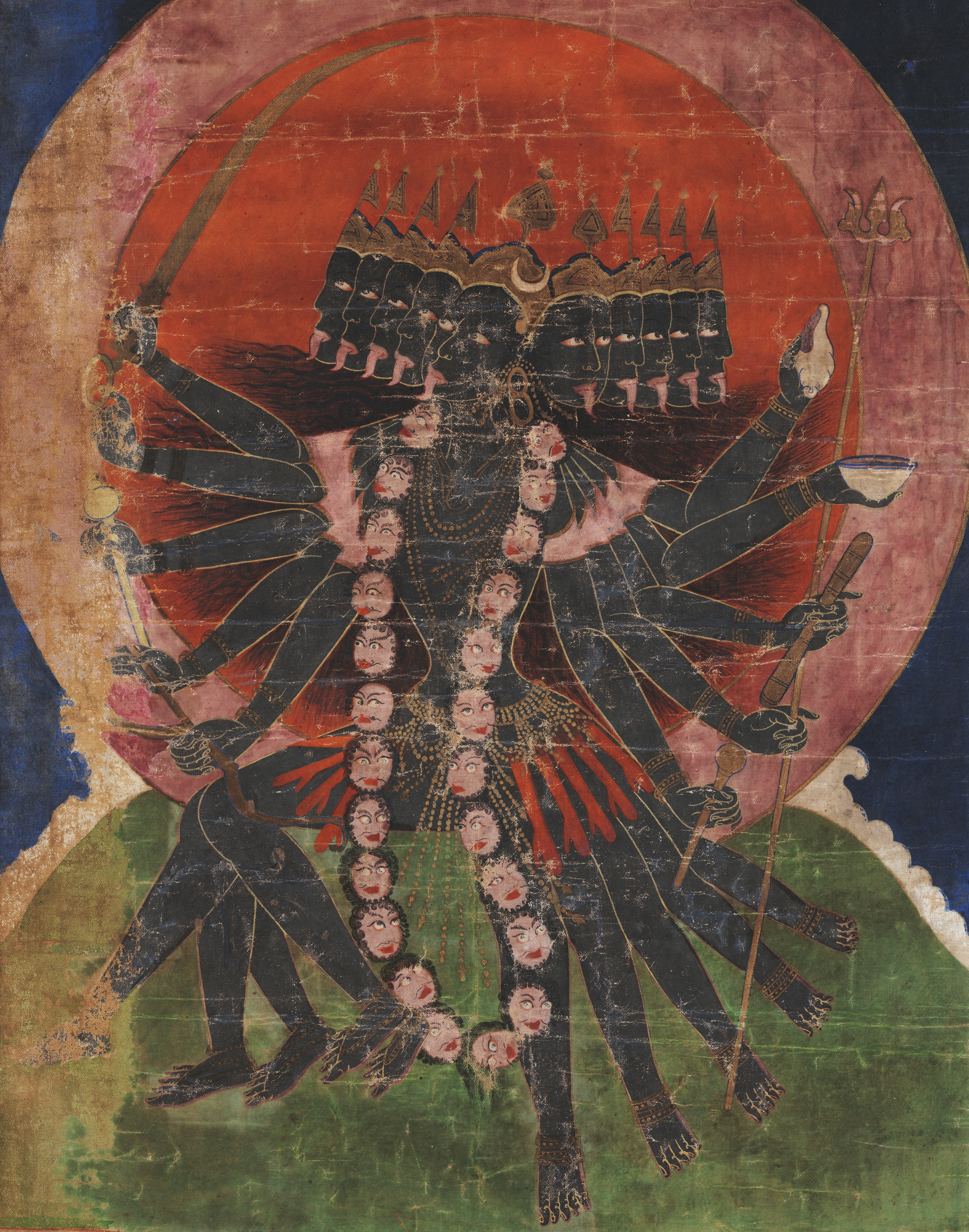
- Mahakali, National Museum, Delhi
- Devanagari: महाकाली
- Sanskrit transliteration: Mahākālī
- Affiliation: Mahadevi, Parvati, Shaktism, Kali, Tridevi, Lakshmi, Saraswati
- Abode: Manidvipa
- Mantra: Oṁ Śrī Mahākālikāyai namaḥ; Oṁ Kālī Mahākālī Kalike Parameśvarī Sarvānanda Devī Nārāyaṇī namostute
- Weapon: shield, trishula, sword, dagger, bow and arrow, scimitar, cobra, gada, chakra, noose, vajra
- Consort: Shiva as Mahakala

Mahakali (Sanskrit: महाकाली, romanized: Mahākālī) is a deity common to Hinduism and Buddhism. In Hinduism, she is the goddess of time and death in the goddess-centric tradition of Shaktism. She is also known as the supreme being in various Hindu tantras and Puranas. She is an incarnation of the Hindu goddess Kali.

Mahakali is a fierce goddess associated with universal power, time, life, death, and both rebirth and liberation. She is the consort of Mahakala, the god of consciousness, the basis of reality and existence. Mahakali, in Sanskrit, is etymologically the feminised variant of Mahakala, or Great Time (which is also interpreted as Death), Shiva in Hinduism.

== Meaning ==
Mahakali's origin is found in various Puranic and Tantric Hindu scriptures (Shastras). In the texts of Shaktism, she is variously portrayed as the Adi-Shakti, the Primeval Force of the Universe, identical with the Ultimate Reality, or Brahman. She is also known as the (female) Prakriti or the world as opposed to the (male) Purusha or the consciousness, or as one of three manifestations of Mahadevi (The Great Goddess) that represent the three Gunas or attributes in Samkhya philosophy. In this interpretation, Mahakali represents Tamas or the force of inertia. Devi Mahatmya ("Greatness of the Goddess"), a later interpolation into the Markandeya Purana, is considered to be one of the core texts of Shaktism (the branch of Hinduism which considers Durga to be the highest aspect of Godhead). It assigns a different form of the Goddess (Mahasaraswati, Mahalakshmi, and Mahakali) to each of the three episodes therein. Here, Mahakali is assigned to the first episode.

== Iconography ==
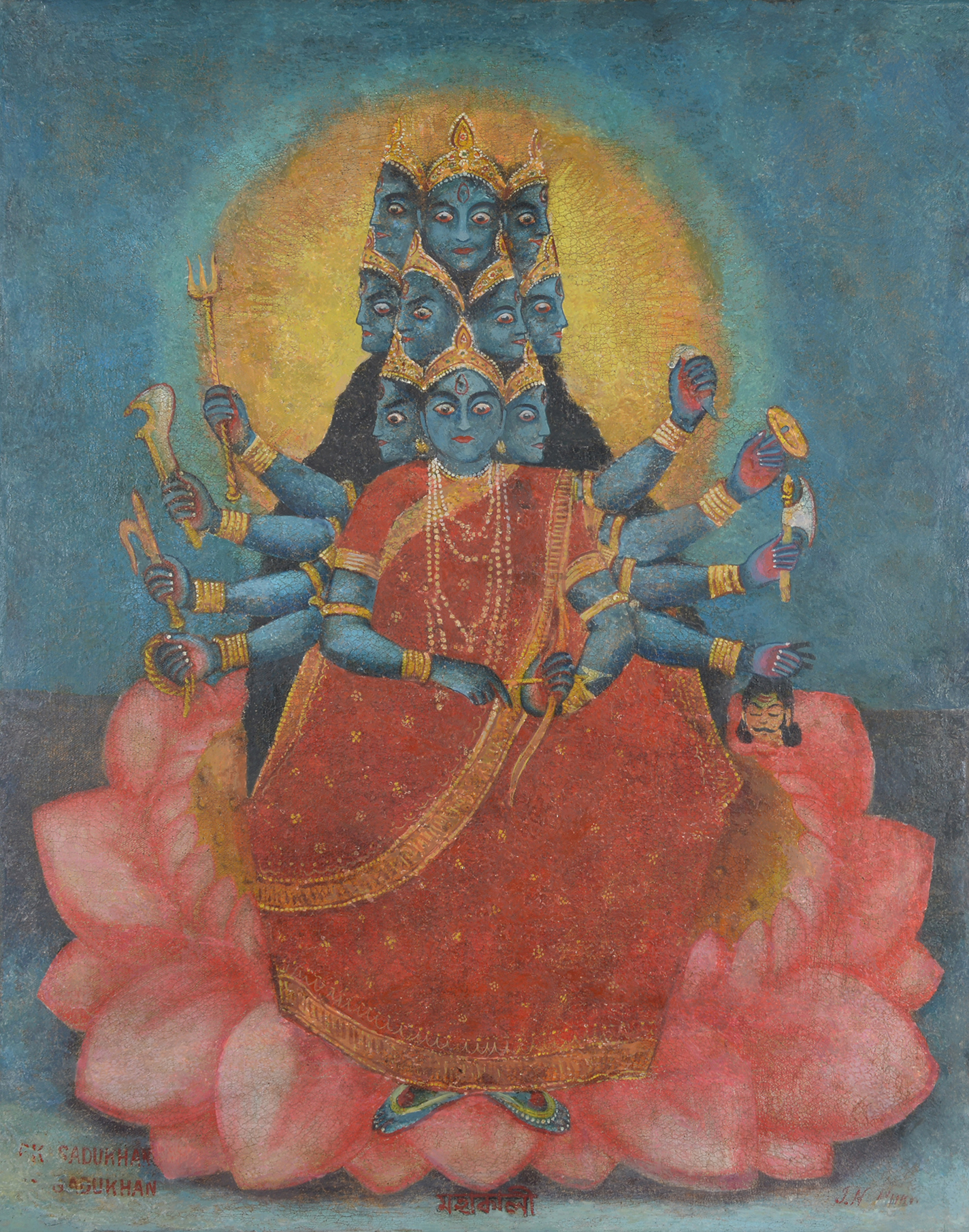
Mahakali sitting on a Lotus

Mahakali is most often depicted in blue/black complexion in popular Indian art.

Her most common four-armed iconographic image shows each hand carrying variously a crescent-shaped khadha, a sword, a trishula (trident), a severed head of a demon and a bowl or skull-cup (kapala) catching the blood of the severed head. Her eyes are described as red with intoxication and in absolute rage, her hair is shown disheveled, small fangs sometimes protrude out of her mouth and her tongue is lolling. The blood of the demons she slays drips out of her lolling tongue, having consumed it. She is adorned with a garland consisting of the heads of demons she has slaughtered, variously enumerated at 108 (an auspicious number in Hinduism and the number of countable beads on a japa mala, similar to a rosary, for repetition of mantras) or 50, which represents the letters of the Sanskrit alphabet, Devanagari, and wears a skirt made of demon arms.

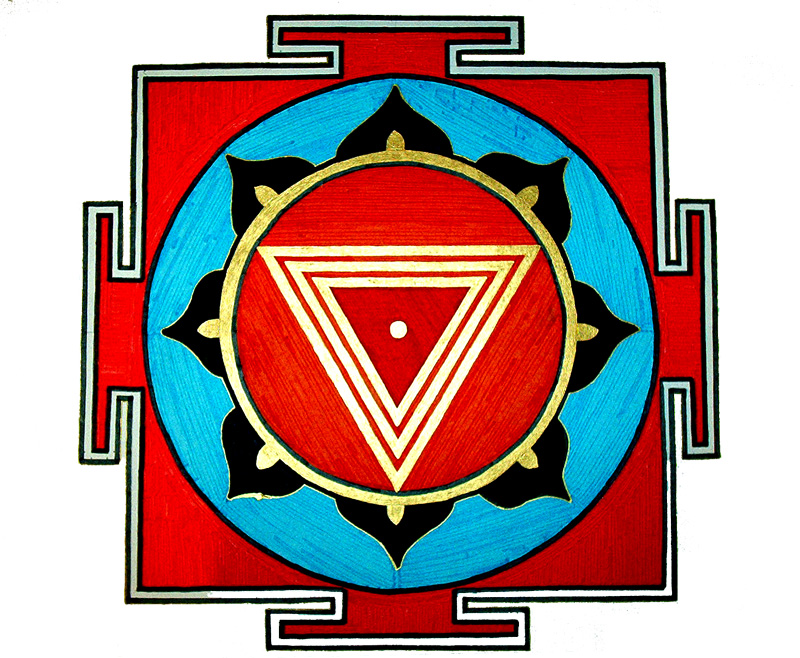
Mahakali Yantra

Her ten-headed (dashamukhi) image is known as the 10 Mahavidyas Mahakali, and in this form she is said to represent the ten Mahavidyas or "Great Wisdom (goddess)". She is sometimes shown sitting on a flaming grave or a rotting corpse. Her complexion is described as that of the night sky, devoid of stars. She is depicted in this form as having ten heads, thirty flaming eyes, ten arms, and ten legs but otherwise usually conforms to the four armed icon in other respects. Each of her ten hands is carrying an implement which varies in different accounts, but each of these represent the power of one of the devas, and are often the identifying weapon or ritual item of a given deva. The implication is that Mahakali subsumes and is responsible for the powers that these deities possess and this is in line with the interpretation that Mahakali is identical with Brahman. While not displaying ten heads, an ekamukhi (one-headed) image may be displayed with ten arms, signifying the same concept: the powers of the various gods coming only through her grace.

In either one of these images she is shown standing on the prone, inert body of Shiva. This is interpreted in various ways but the most common is that Mahakali represents Shakti, the power of pure creation in the universe, and Shiva represents pure Consciousness which is inert in and of itself. While this is an advanced concept in monistic Shaktism, it also agrees with the Nondual Trika philosophy of Kashmir, popularly known as Kashmir Shaivism and associated most famously with Abhinavagupta. There is a colloquial saying that "Shiva without Shakti is Shava" which means that without the power of action (Shakti) that is Mahakali (represented as the short "i" in Devanagari) Shiva (or consciousness itself) is inactive; Shava means corpse in Sanskrit and the play on words is that all Sanskrit consonants are assumed to be followed by a short letter "a" unless otherwise noted. The short letter "i" represents the female power or Shakti that activates Creation. This is often the explanation for why she is standing on Shiva, who is her husband in Shaktism, and also the Supreme Godhead in Shaivism. Another understanding is that the wild destructive Mahakali can only stop her fury in the presence of Shiva the God of Consciousness, so that the balance of life is not completely overrun over by wild nature.

=== Jain Beliefs ===
According to Jainism, Mahākālī is a sasana-devi, also called Yakshini, which is a class of female guardian deities. Some traditions state that she is the Yakṣiṇī of the 5th Tirthankara Sumatinatha, while others say she is the attendant deity of Suvidhinatha, the 9th Tirthankara. Mahākālī also refers to one of the sixteen Jain goddesses of learning, known as Vidya Devis.

The Śvetāmbara traditions have two descriptions for the goddess Mahākālī. Both state that she rides on a man, but differ about what she holds in her hands. The Digambara form of Mahākālī is to be represented as standing on a corpse and bearing in her hands a bow, sword, fruit and weapon. She is mentioned in Chapter 3.3 of Trishashti Shalaka Purusha Caritra, where she is described as golden.

In 12th century CE, the Achalgaccha of the Śvetāmbara sect of Jainism was established at Pavagadh by Acharya Aryarakshitsuri with promise of protection of sangha by Mahakali. He was unhappy with the wrong practices that had crept into the conduct of Jain monks due to the influence of yatis. He attempted reforms, but failed. Therefore, he ascended the hill to perform Sallekhana. Legend says that demi-goddess Mahakali appeared before him and requested the Acharya to not perform Sallekhana and said that he was the only one who could spread the truth. She asked him to start a new order based on the truth of the Agamas and assured him that she would safeguard the lay-followers of the new order and that they will prosper. Thus, in 1112 CE, Acharya Aryarakshitsuri founded the Achalgaccha (or Viddhipaksh) at Pavagadh, and installed demi-goddess Mahakali as the adhishthayika (transl. protecting deity) of the gaccha. The founder Śrāvakas of the gaccha installed the idol of Mahakali on the hill to mark their respects. This is the idol and the shrine which was later encroached upon by Hindus. Under guidance of Acharya Kalyansagarsuri, a monk and reformer of Achalgaccha, sravakas Sheth Vardhaman and Sheth Padamshin reconstructed the shrine of Mahakali at Pavagadh in 16th century CE. In a laudatory poem dedicated to Jirawala Parshvanatha and composed by Jain monk Dipvijay Kaviraaj in late 18th century CE, the temples existing in Pavagadh are described in detail. Mahakali has been considered to be the protecting deity of the Achalgaccha and its lay-followers.

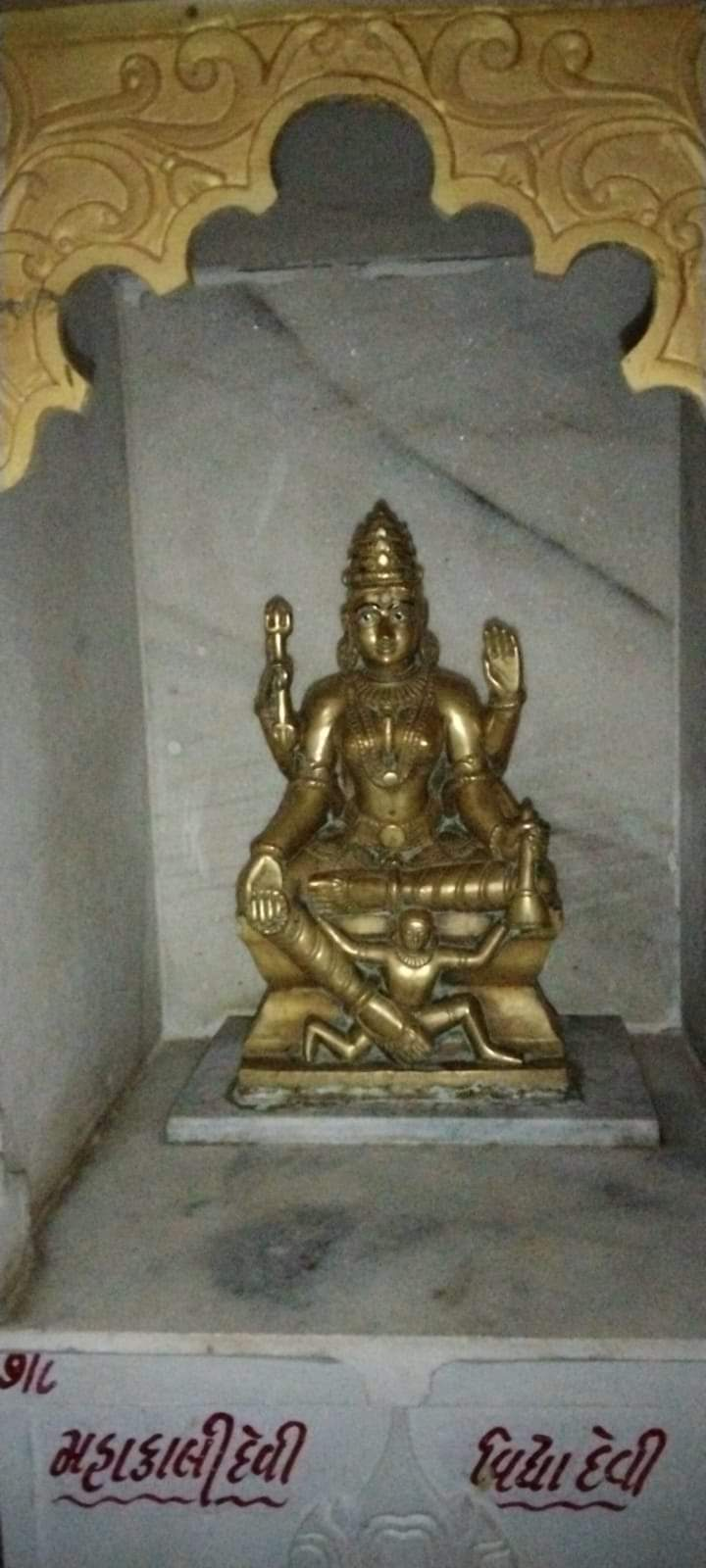
Jain idol of Mahakali, the adhishthaayika of Achalgaccha and the sasana-devi of the 5th Tirthankara Sumatinatha Bhagwaan

=== Kashmir Shaivism ===
In Kashmir Shaivism, the highest form of Kali is Kalasankarshini, who is nirguna, formless and is often shown as a flame above the head of Guhyakali, the highest gross form of Kali. In Nepali Newar arts, both form and formless attributes of Kali are often envisioned in a single art form showing the hierarchy of goddesses in their tradition. In it, the Guhyakali image culminates in flame, with Kalasankarshini, the highest deity in the sequence, who consumes time within herself and is envisioned solely as a flame representing Para Brahman. She is like a divine actress in her own universal play who assumes the form and role of Sristi Kali, Rakta Kali, Yama Kali, Samhara Kali, Mrityu Kali, Rudra Kali, Mahakaala Kali, Paramaraka Kali, Kalagnirudra Kali, Martanda Kali, Sthitinasha Kali and Mahabhairavaghorachanda Kali who is none other than Kalasankarshini Kali.

== Literature ==
The Kali Sahasranama Stotra from the Kalika Kulasarvasva Tantra states that she is supreme (paramā) and indeed Durga, Śruti, Smriti, Mahalakshmi, Saraswati, Ātman Vidya and Brahmavidya. In the Mahanirvana Tantra she is called Adya or Primordial Kali, the origin and devourer of all things:

Because Thou devourest Kala, Thou art Kali, the original form of all things, and because Thou art the Origin of and devourest all things Thou art called the Adya Kali. Resuming after Dissolution Thine own form, dark and formless, Thou alone remainest as One ineffable and inconceivable. Though having a form, yet art Thou formless; though Thyself without beginning, multiform by the power of Maya, Thou art the Beginning of all, Creatrix, Protectress, and Destructress.

The Markandeya Purana describes Mahakali as the Unborn, the Eternal, Mahamari and Lakshmi after her slaying of Shumbha and Nishumbha:

All this egg of Brahmā, O king, is pervaded by her, who is Mahākālī at Māhākāla, and who has the nature of the Great Destroying Goddess. She indeed is Mahāmārī at the fated time; she indeed is creation, the Unborn; she indeed the Eternal gives stability to created beings at their fated time. She indeed is Lakṣmī, bestowing prosperity on the houses of men while she abides with them.

— Markandeya Purana, Canto XCII

In Devi Bhagavata Purana, the four-armed Vishnu is described as being unable to defeat Madhu-Kaitabha. After getting tired of trying to destroy them, he decides to rest for a while. During this time he came to know that they have been granted the boon of Iccāmrityu, or death at will, by the supreme Śakti. Realizing that he will not be able to kill the two Danavas, he decided to take the refuge of Mahakali:

Then the supreme Yogi, Bhagavān Viṣṇu, of immeasurable spirit began to praise with folded palms that great Bhuvaneśvarī Mahā Kāli, the giver of boons for the destruction of the Dānavas. “O Devī! I bow down to Thee O Mahāmāyā, the Creatrix and Destructrix! Thou beginningless and deathless! O auspicious Chandike! The Bestower of enjoyment and liberation I do not know Thy Saguṇa or Nirguṇa forms”

— The Devi Bhagavata Purana, Book 1, Chapter 9

In Chapters 13 and 23 of Brihan Nila Tantra she is called the cause of everything, Gayatri, Lakshmi, Mahāmāyā, Parameshwari, omniscient, worshipped by Shiva himself, the great absolute (māhāparā), supreme (paramā), the mother of the highest reality (parāparāmba) and Ātman. The Devyāgama and further Tantra Shastras, assert that her own form is Para Brahman (parabrahmasvarūpiṇī). She is also variously referred to as Soul of the universe, Paramatman, Bīja and Nirguna.

Several other scriptures also state that Mahakali is the primordial being. Some examples of this are the Mahabhagavata Purana, the Rudrayamala and the Kalika Purana.

== Legacy ==
Mahakali's influence extends into Nepali Army through the Gurkha war cry "Jaya Mahakali, Aayo Gorkhali!" ("Victory to Mahakali, the Gorkhalis have arrived!"). Invoking Mahakali, the fierce warrior goddess associated with power and destruction of evil. The battle cry has a long history within the Nepali Army and has traditionally been used by Nepali soldiers before entering battle.

== See also ==
- Durga – Major deity in Hinduism
- Kali Puja – Hindu festival dedicated to the goddess Kali
- Parvati – Major goddess in Hinduism
- Tridevi – Trinity of chief goddesses in Hinduism
- Mahavidya – Group of ten Hindu goddesses
