= Yati =

Jain scholar

Yati, historically was the general term for a monk or pontiff in Jainism.

== Jainism ==
In the late medieval period, yati came to represent a stationary monk, who lived in one place rather than wandering as required for a Jain monk. The term was more common for the Śvētāmbara monastics, but was also used by the Digambaras. The term has also been occasionally for ascetics from other traditions.

Some scholars married and were termed sansari yati or mahātmās.

Some ruling dynasties in Rajasthan had a close relationship with yatis. Abu'l-Fazl ibn Mubarak mentions that yatis were invited to participate in the discussion on religions.

The stationary yatis often managed institutions and properties. Some of their residences are termed jatiji in their memory.

With the re-establishment of orders of wandering (samvegi) monks since late 19th and early 20th century, the number of yatis have declined significantly.

=== Shripujya ===
The heads of the institutions of Śvetāmbara yatis were often termed shripujya, similar to Digambara institutions headed by the Bhattarakas. Only a celibate yati could become a shripujya. They have now been replaced by acharyas who head orders of wandering monks.

=== Prominent Jain yatis ===
- Yativṛṣabha, 500-570
- Rajendrasuri who was initiated as a yati and later helped transform the Śvetambara Mūrtipūjaka tradition in 1880.
- Yati Lavaji, the founder of the Sthānakavāsī sect about 1653
- Yati Yatanlal, (1894-1967) freedom fighter. There is an award named after him.

== See also ==
- Yativṛṣabha
- Bhattaraka
- Mahātmā#Jain Mahatmas in Dabestān-e Mazāheb
