= Champaner-Pavagadh Archaeological Park =

UNESCO World Heritage Site in Gujarat, India

UNESCO World Heritage Site
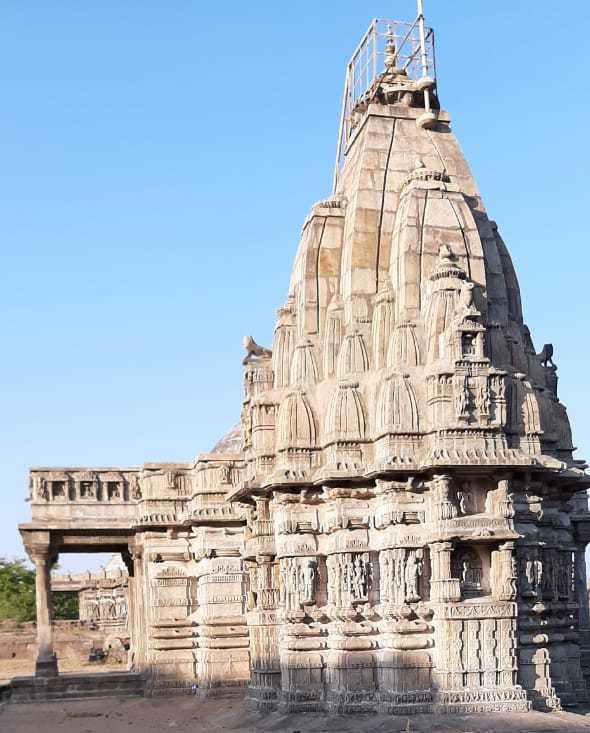
- View of Jain temples, Pavagadh in Champaner

- Location within Gujarat Location within India Location within South Asia
- Location: Panchmahal district, Gujarat, India
- Criteria: Cultural: (iii), (iv), (v), (vi)
- Reference: 1101
- Inscription: 2004 (28th Session)
- Area: 1,328.89 ha (3,283.8 acres)
- Buffer zone: 2,911.74 ha (7,195.1 acres)
- Coordinates: 22°29′N 73°32′E

Champaner-Pavagadh Archaeological Park, a UNESCO World Heritage Site, is located in Panchmahal district in Gujarat, India. It is centered around the historic city of Champaner, which was founded by Vanraj Chavda, the most prominent king of the Chavda Dynasty, in the eighth century. He named it after his friend and general, Champa, also known later as Champaraj. The heritage site contains forts with bastions starting from the hills of Pavagadh, and extending into the city of Champaner. The park includes archaeological, historical, and living cultural heritage monuments, including Chalcolithic sites, a hill fortress of an early Hindu capital, and remains of the 16th-century capital of the state of Gujarat. There are palaces, entrance gates and arches, mosques, tombs and temples, residential complexes, agricultural structures and water installations such as stepwells and tanks, dating from the eighth to the 14th centuries. The Kalika Mata Temple, located on top of the 800 metres (2,600 ft) high Pavagadh Hill, is an important Hindu shrine in the region, attracting pilgrims throughout the year.

The transition between Hindu and Muslim culture and architecture in the late 15th to early 16th century is documented in the park, particularly the early Islamic and pre-Mughal city that has remained largely unchanged. It was inscribed on the UNESCO World Heritage List in 2004.

== Geography ==
Map of the Archeological Park

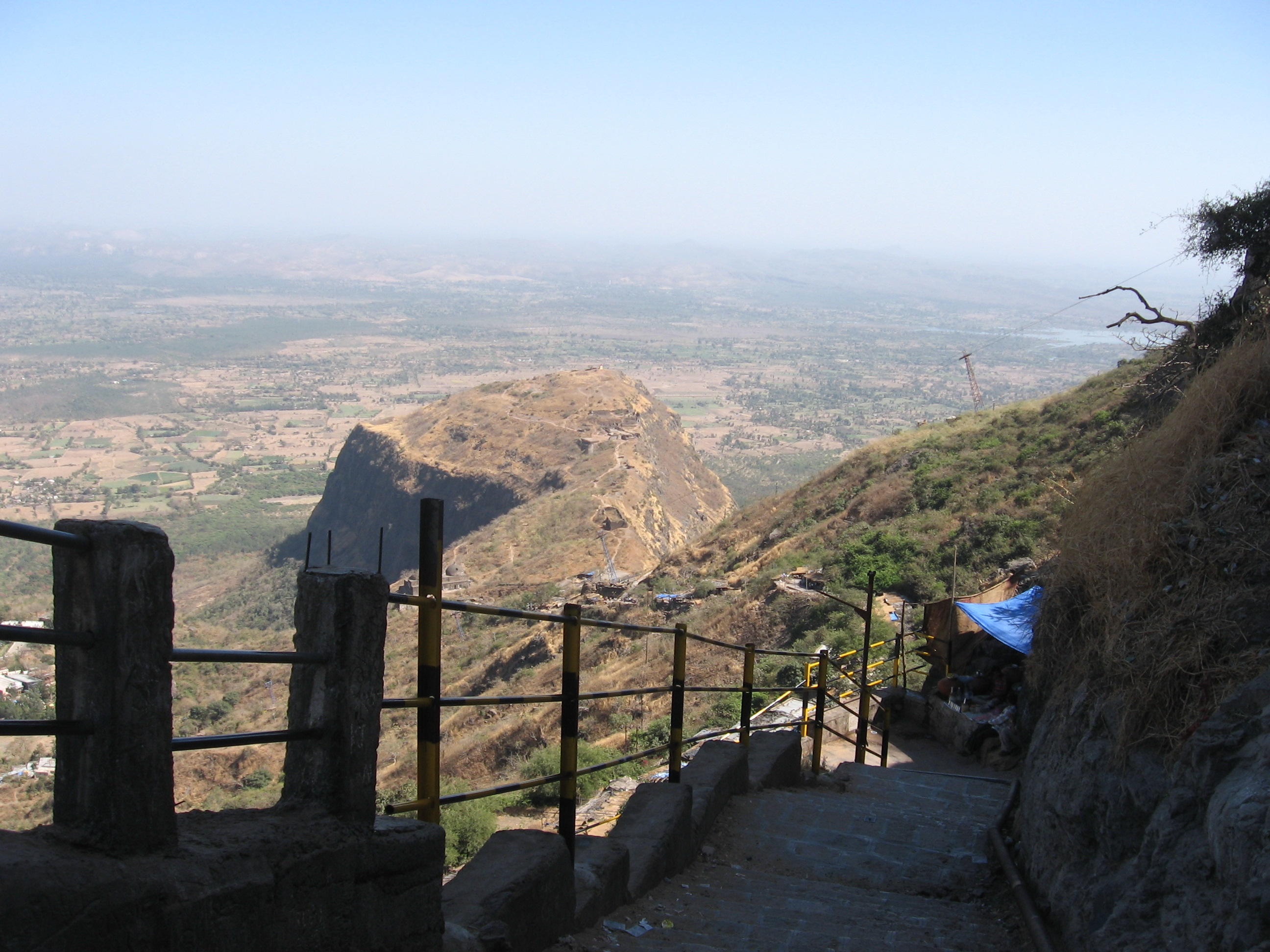
Path on Pavagadh Hill

The Champaner-Pavagadh heritage site is spread over an area of more than 1,329 hectares (3,280 acres) with a buffer zone of 2,812 hectares (6,950 acres). In addition to the Primary Heritage Zone of 983.27 hectares (2,429.7 acres), there are several other sites which include: Kabutarkhana, Maqbara, Maqbara Mandvi, Maqbara near Patidar Village, Malik Sandal Ni Vav, Hathikhana, Sindh Mata, Sikander Ka Reuza, Babakhan Ki Dargah, Nau Kuan Sat Vavdi, and Chandrakala Vav. The site is 50 kilometres (31 mi) east of Baroda and 68 kilometres (42 mi) south of Godhra, whose history is recorded from the second century AD and which has many religious monuments of Gujarati Sultans (of Turkish descent), Rajputs, and Jains. It includes the Palace of Mahmud Begada, grandson of Ahmed Shah, who founded Ahmedabad City, Jama Masjid and other mosques. The setting is undulating hillocks and plateaus. There are steep rock exposures formed by ancient volcanic eruptions and lava flows.

Champaner is located at 22°30′N 73°30′E, about 1.61 kilometres (1.00 mi) to the south of Pavagadh Hill. Pavagadh Hill rises to a height of 800 metres (2,600 ft), has a geological setting of reddish-yellow stone, and is considered to be one of the oldest rock formations in India. The highest point of the hill presents an undulating forested topography in the direction of Jambughoda. The Pavagadh Hill has a historical fort where the ancient Kalika Mata Temple is situated. The path to the summit passes through many old gates and cuts through staircase-like natural ledges of rock with precipitous sides. Midway up this path is a flat area strewn with boulders. Above this point there is a very steep scarp with a marble temple and two lantern towers.

== History ==
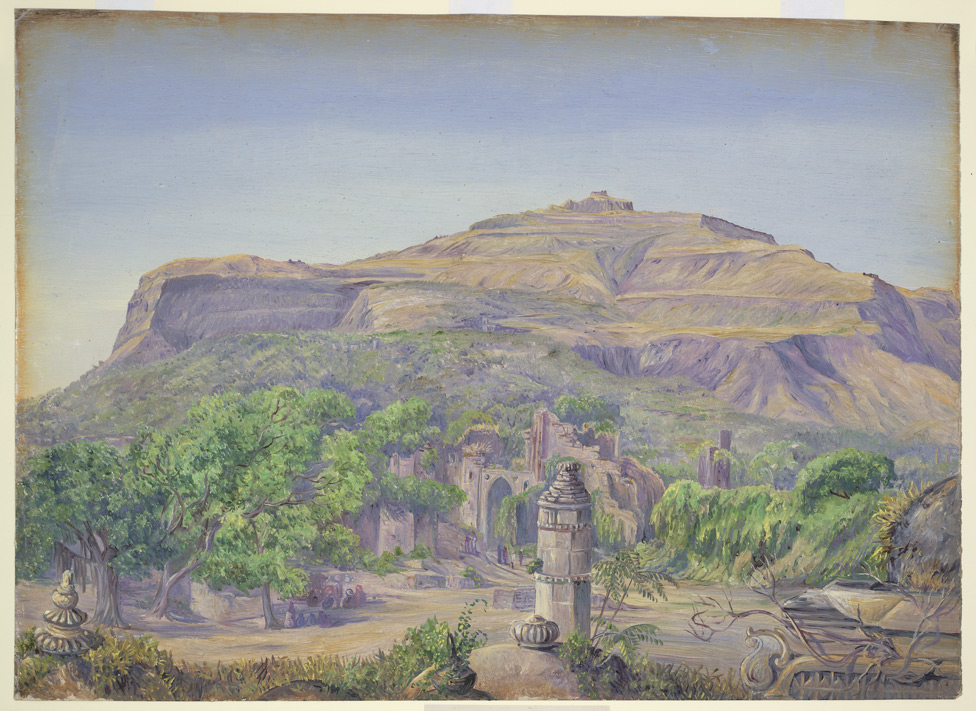
Oil painting on paper, Champaner, 1879

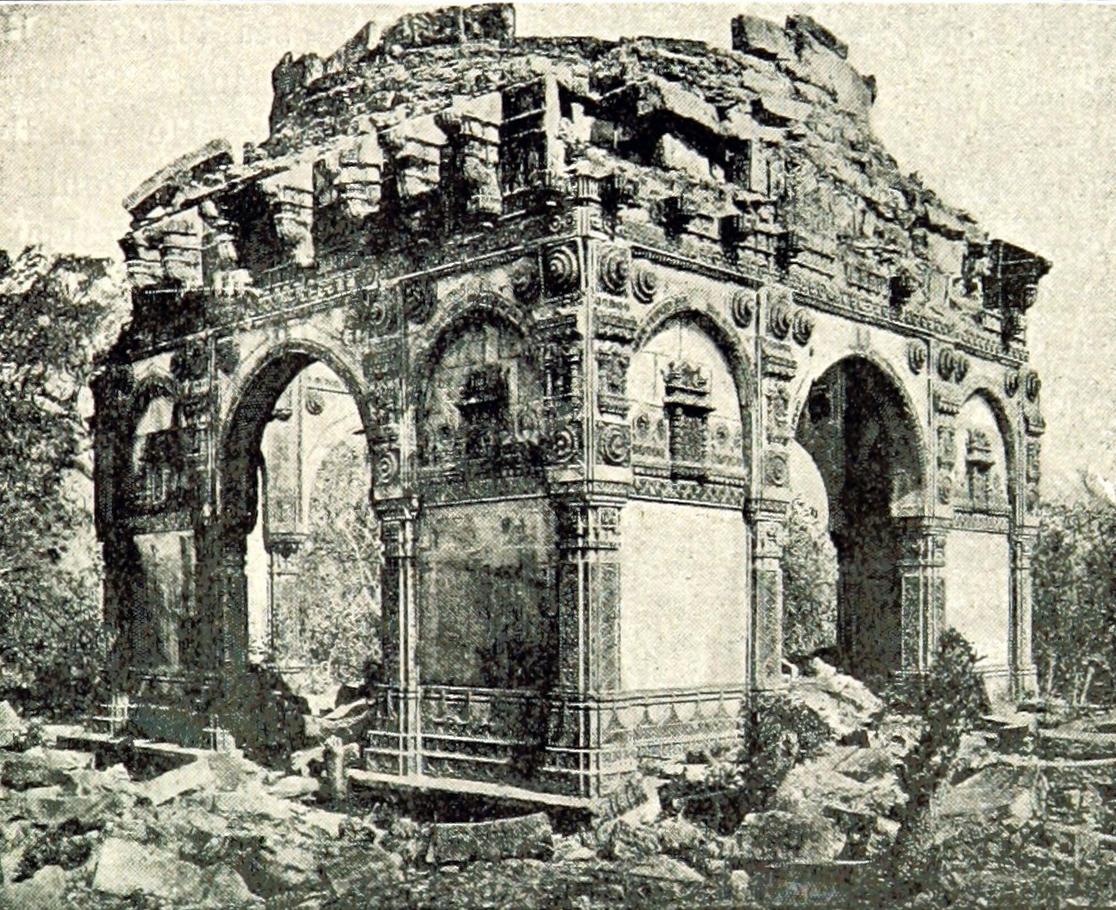
Ruined tomb at Champaner, 1893

=== Early history ===
Judging by early archaeological remains and according to records, the area had already been inhabited in the Chalcolithic period; however, it remained neglected until approximately 400 AD. The history also reports a local legend that the divinity of the hills was derived from the right toe of the goddess Kalika, which had apparently fallen on the hill.

Champaner is named after Champa Bhil, a last Bhil king of Champaner. Champa Bhil built Champaner Fort He also established this city during the rule of Vanraj Chavda of Anhilwad Patan (from 746 to 806 AD). In the eleventh century, Ram Gaur Tuar ruled, and Champaner was under the Anhilwad until 1297 or so when they were defeated by Alauddin Khalji, who made it their stronghold. During this period, the Chauhan Rajput had also settled in Champaner. The Pavagadh Hill was where the Solanki kings and Khichi Chauhans built fortresses and ruled from. However, they lost their authority in Champaner in 1484.

In 1418 and in about 1450, Khichis managed to fight off their neighbour, Rao of Idar, and the Muslim rulers of Ahmedabad, thanks to the protection provided by the hill. However, in 1482, when Mahmud Begada's captain, Malik Sida, was raiding through Champaner, he was attacked and killed by Raval Jaisingh. What ensued in the following years was the complete defeat of the Rajputs by Sultan Begada. The hill was surrounded and the fort held under siege for around twenty months and was finally captured on 17 November 1484, when Kiamul Mulk and Malik Ayaz Sultani penetrated the walls and broke the main gate, destroyed the army and injured the leaders of the Rajput. Raval Jaisingh was wounded and for six months was given amnesty but was then executed since he refused to convert to Islam.

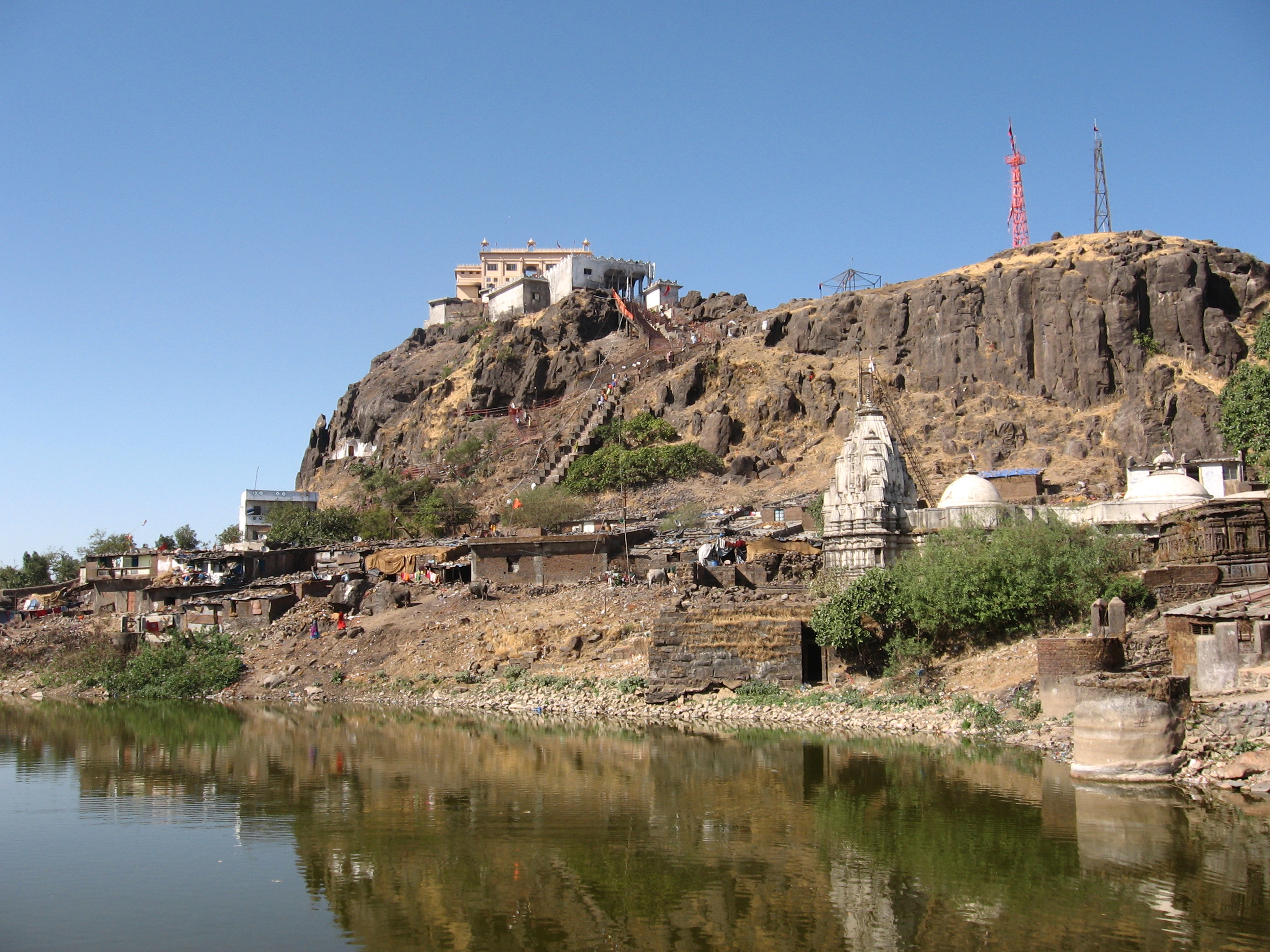
Pavadagh Hill

Raval's son, however, converted to Islam and was made a noble with the title "Nizam-ul-Mulk". After the fort was seized, Mahmud renamed the city "Muhmudabad-Champaner". It was during this period that Mahmud laid the foundation stone for his mosque. He built elaborate ornate structures, fortified both the forts, made the hill fort his Mauliya (meaning Lord of the Hill) and his citadel over a period of 23 years and eventually moved his capital from Ahmadabad to Champaner.

During this period, Champaner was famous for mangoes, sandalwood trees (used then for house building and sword blades), and colourful silks. Merchants and craftsmen prospered. Mahmud died in 1511 and his successors continued to rule from Champaner until the death of Bahadur Shah (1536). The city of Champaner had been very well planned with streets and whitewashed stone houses. In 1526, young Sikander Shah died and Bahadur Shah became the next ruler of Champaner. In 1535, the Mughal Emperor Humayun invaded Champaner and looted the coffers. Upon Bahadur's death in 1536, the capital and the court shifted back to Ahmadabad. The city fell into rapid decline, was largely abandoned and for several centuries was neglected and almost deserted.

This was a Jain pilgrimage. There were several attempts to destroy evidences of its Jain heritage. However, a court ordered against destruction of facts and heritage. Its Jain history dates back to 3rd century BC.

1. King Samprati, in the 3rd century BC, constructed and installed the idol of Sambhavnatha which was consecrated by Svetambara Jain monk Acharya Suhastisuri.
2. In 1055 AD, Śvetāmbara monk Acharya Gunsagarsuri consecrated a new temple of Jirawala Parshvanath and reconstructed an ancient 52-shrine temple of Abhinandanswami.
3. In 10th century AD, the Achalgacch of the Śvetāmbara sect of Jainism was established here by Acharya Aryarakshitsuri. He was unhappy with the wrong practices that had crept into the conduct of Jain monks due to the influence of yatis. He attempted reforms, but failed. Therefore, he ascended the hill to perform Sallekhana. Legend says that demi-goddess Mahakali appeared before him and requested the Acharya to not perform Sallekhana and said that he was the only one who could spread the truth. She asked him to start a new order based on the truth of the Agamas and assured him that she would safeguard the lay-followers of the new order and that they will prosper. Thus, in 1112 AD, Acharya Aryarakshitsuri founded the Achalgacch (or Viddhipaksh) at Pavagadh, and installed demi-goddess Mahakali as the adhishthayika (transl. protecting deity) of the gaccha. The founder Śrāvakas of the gaccha installed the idol of Mahakali on the hill to mark their respects. This is the idol and the shrine which was later encroached upon by Hindus.
4. There is a reference to a temple called “Sarvatobhadra” (transl. auspicious on all sides) built by Minister Tejpal in 12th century.
5. Ceremonial installation and consecration of a temple built by Jayawant Seth by Acharya Vijaysensuri in 1581 AD.
6. Under guidance of Acharya Kalyansagarsuri, a monk and reformer of Achalgacch, sravakas Sheth Vardhaman and Sheth Padamshin reconstructed the shrine of Mahakali in 16th century AD.
7. In 1689 AD, Gani Shilvijay Maharaj has referred to the existence of a temple of Neminatha.
8. In a laudatory poem dedicated to Jirawala Parshvanatha and composed by Jain monk Dipvijay Kaviraaj in late 18th century AD, the temples existing here are described in detail.

Several monks of the Achalgacch such as Mahendraprabhasuri, Merutungasuri, and Jaykesarisuri amongst many, and those of the Tapagacch such as Dharmaratnasuri, Hemvimalsuri, Laxmisagarsuri, Bhuvansundarsuri etc. consecrated numerous temples and idols on the hill. According to several Śvetāmbara scriptures, at one time, these shrines were considered to be of equal rank and importance as those atop the hill at Palitana.

It is believed that there was one large Śvetāmbara temple earlier on the hill, which faced multiple invasions. The ruins of this temple were used to construct 3 smaller Digambar temples.

=== Later history ===
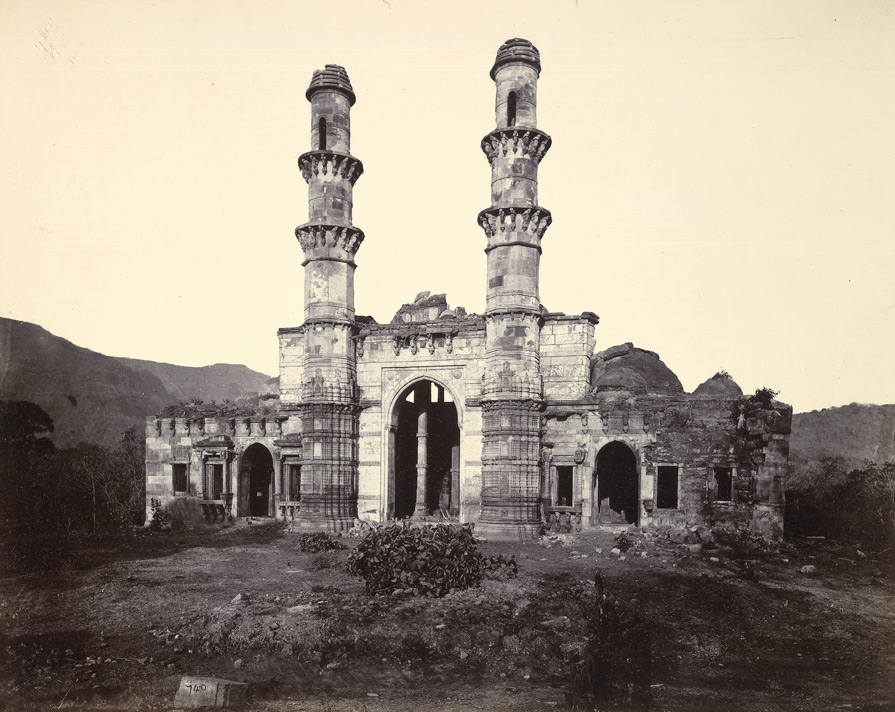
General view of the Nagina Masjid, 1885

The British visited the town of Champaner in 1803, at which time there were only 500 people residing there. The old city was in ruins and wildly overgrown. They re-founded it and it became a great exporter of silk, with facilities for washing and preparing raw silk. However, a cholera epidemic reduced the population to 400 families by 1812. When the British finally usurped the area on 13 July 1829, it was almost deserted; efforts at that time to populate the place by inducting cultivators with an incentive of Rs 1260 to develop the lands at that time also failed. In 1879, a few Bhil and Naikda tribes resided there, but over the next few years, it became well known in India for its rulers and the monuments left behind by them

In the last decade the site has received attention by archaeologists and Heritage Trusts working in the area to develop it into a tourist attraction and a World Heritage Site. The Baroda Heritage Trust took the initiative in this direction and carried out a landscape study of the former urban centre. A Master Plan for an archaeological park was developed for Champaner City and Pavagarh as a cultural sanctuary, and the Archaeological Survey of India, supported by the Baroda Heritage Trust, submitted a proposal to UNESCO to declare the site a World Heritage Site. In July 2004, UNESCO approved the proposal and inscribed the site on the World Heritage List with the justification of its "joint significance as a living Hindu pilgrimage center, its cluster of Jain temples, its remarkable preserved medieval urban fabric, its exquisite sandstone-carved mosques and tombs and its intangible heritage values". Tourism in the area was affected by the Godhra Hindu-Muslim riots, resulting in conflicting interests in developing infrastructure such as roads, ropeway and accommodation facilities for the pilgrims and tourists visiting the various monuments in this site.

== City planning ==
Remaining at the site are the Royal precincts within fortified walls, the entrance gate or the city gate, the mosque outside the fortifications, the royal walkway leading into the palace, and the second enclosure consisting of unexplored Jahanpanah. The urban planning of the city reveals well laid and paved streets which lead to the city centre. The residential area consists of houses of both rich and poor; rich people's houses are built with scenic gardens and water channels. Public parks and pavilions surround the housing complex. However, temples, mosques, and tombs are mostly concentrated in the Pavagarh Hills. The walk up the hill from the plains is called the Patha (pilgrim's route); considered to be the "soul of Champaner", it has thousands of steps and is embellished with ornamental and essential structures.

Rainwater harvesting

One of the innovative features of the two historic monuments centres was the development of methods for harvesting rainwater, in the form of tanks or ponds in the Pavagadh hills (called the "hill of hundred pools") and innumerable wells in the city of Champaran, which was nicknamed "city of thousand wells". The Vishamitri River is the only stream that rises from the Pavgadh hills, and was tapped for feeding wells in Champaner and tanks in Pavagadh. The tanks served the pilgrims and other utilitarian, recreational, spiritual and aesthetic needs. Some of the tanks were built by constructing embankments and diverting the stored water into stone cisterns. Some of the famous water structures are: the Ganga, Yamuna and Saraswathi Kunds (in the Mauliya plateau); the Wada Talao, the largest water tank fed by rivulets located on the eastern part of the city; the innovative Gaben Shah tank; the exquisitely ornamented helical stepwells such as in the public gardens and at the entrance to the city, and the Royal summer pavilions. The water channel in the house of a noble, called the "Amir’s Manzil", is cited as a reflection of the "superb workmanship of water structures built by those responsible for the palatine and religious architecture of Champaner".

== Monuments ==
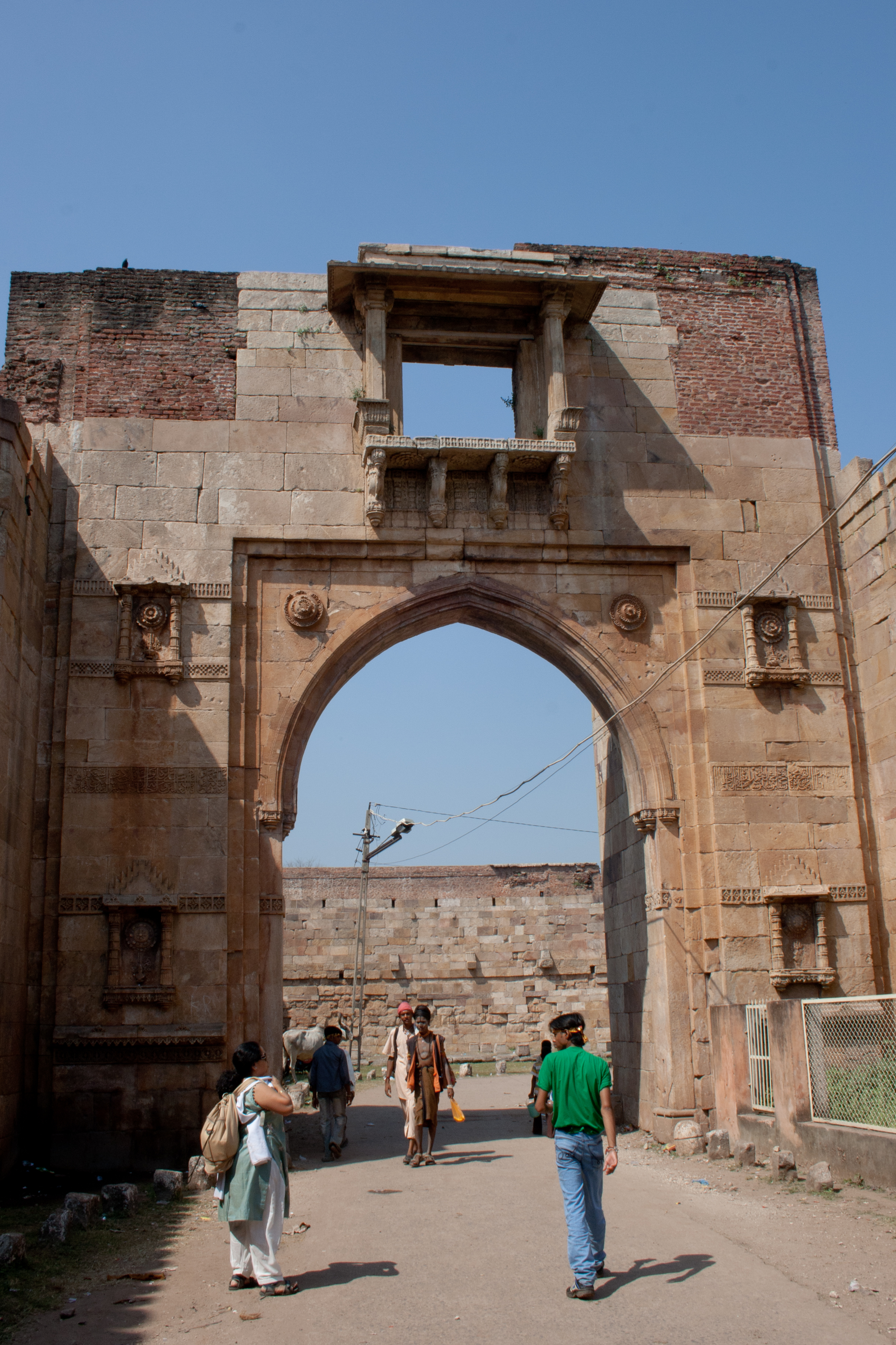
Eastern fortress gate

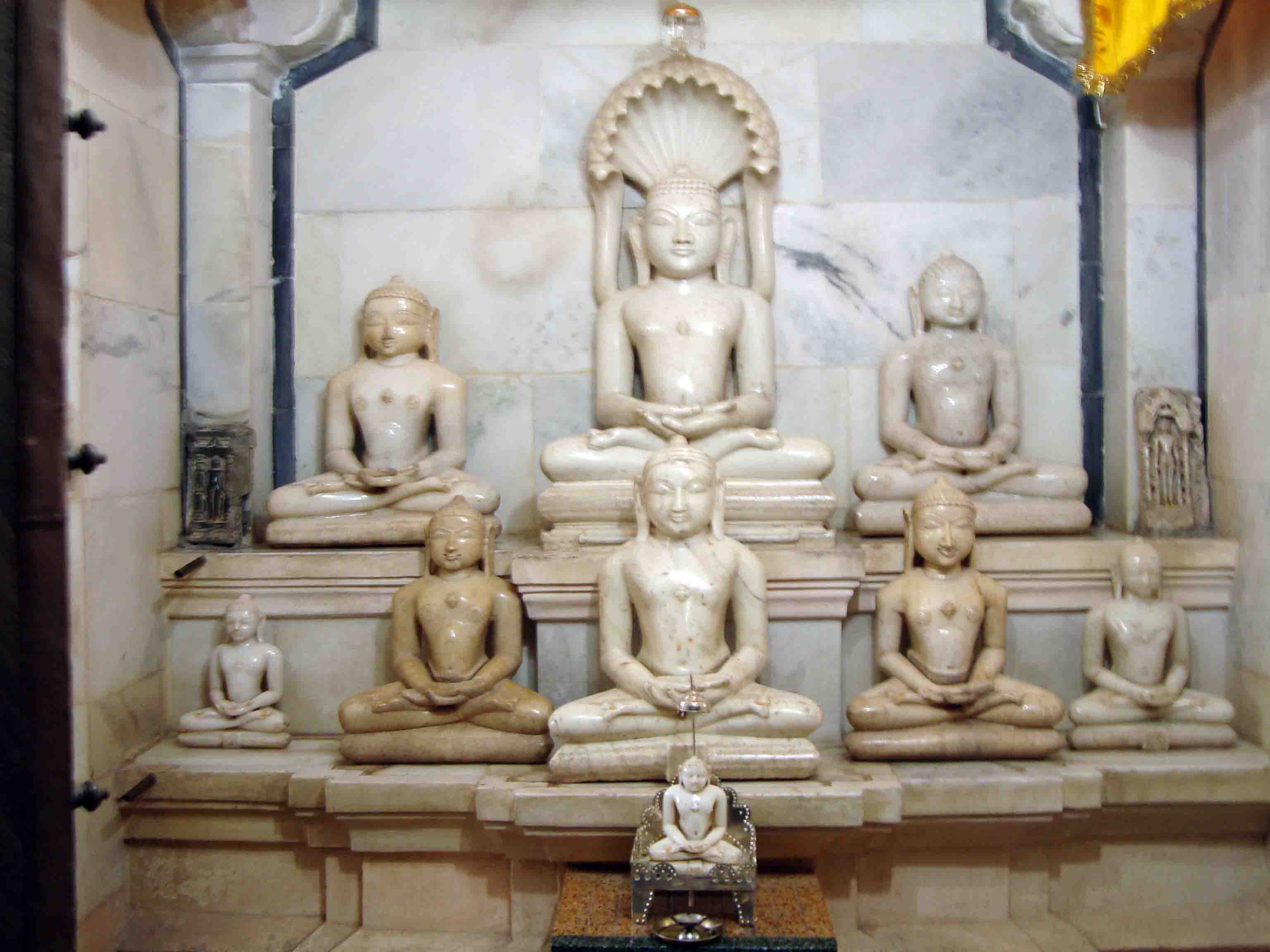

There are eleven different types of buildings at Champaner-Pavagadh, including mosques, temples, granaries, tombs, wells, walls, and terraces. The monuments are situated at the foot of and around the Pavagadh hill. The Heritage Trust of Baroda lists 114 monuments in the area, of which only 39 monuments are maintained by the Archaeological Survey of India, due to limited funding. The Forest Department owns 94% of the land here, while the temple trusts and other sectarian establishments provide facilities for boarding and lodging to the pilgrims and tourists. On the southern side near the foot of the hill some dilapidated houses and the foundations of Jain temples can also be seen.

The monuments include:

Champaner

- Helical stepped well
- Sakar Khan's Dargah
- City Gate near Kasbin Talao
- Citadel walls
- City walls at south-east corner of the citadel going up the hill
- East and South Bhadra Gates
- Sahar ki Masjid (Bohrani)
- Three cells inside the citadel wall between Sahar ki Masjid the local fund Dharmashala
- Mandvi or Custom House
- Jami Masjid
- Stepwell north of Jama Masjid
- Kevda Masjid and Cenotaph
- Tomb with a big dome in the centre and small corner domes on way to Khajuri Masjid near Wada Talao
- Cenotaph of Kevda Masjid
- Nagina Masjid
- Cenotaph of Nagina Masjid
- Lila Gumbaz ki Masjid, Chapaner
- Kabutarkhana Pavilion on the north bank of Wada Talao near Khajuri Masjid
- Kamani Masjid
- Bawaman Mosque

Pavagad hill

- Gate No. 1 on Pavagarh hill (Atak Gate)
- Gate No. 2 (with three gateways, Budhiya gate)
- Gate No. 3 (Moti gate, Sadanshah-Gate)
- Gate No. 4 with big bastion with cells in the interior
- Sat Manzil between gate Nos. 4 and 5 right up to bastions on top
- Mint above Gate No4
- Gate No. 5 near Machi (Gulan Bulan Gate)
- Gate No. 6 (Buland Darwaza)
- Makai Kothar
- Palace of Patai Rawal with tanks
- Gate No. 7 near iron bridge (Makai Gate)
- Gate No. 8 (Tarapore Gate)
- The fort of Pavagad and ruined Hindu and Jain temples on the top of Pavagad hills
- Navlakha Kothar
- Walls of fort on top

=== Fortresses and walls ===
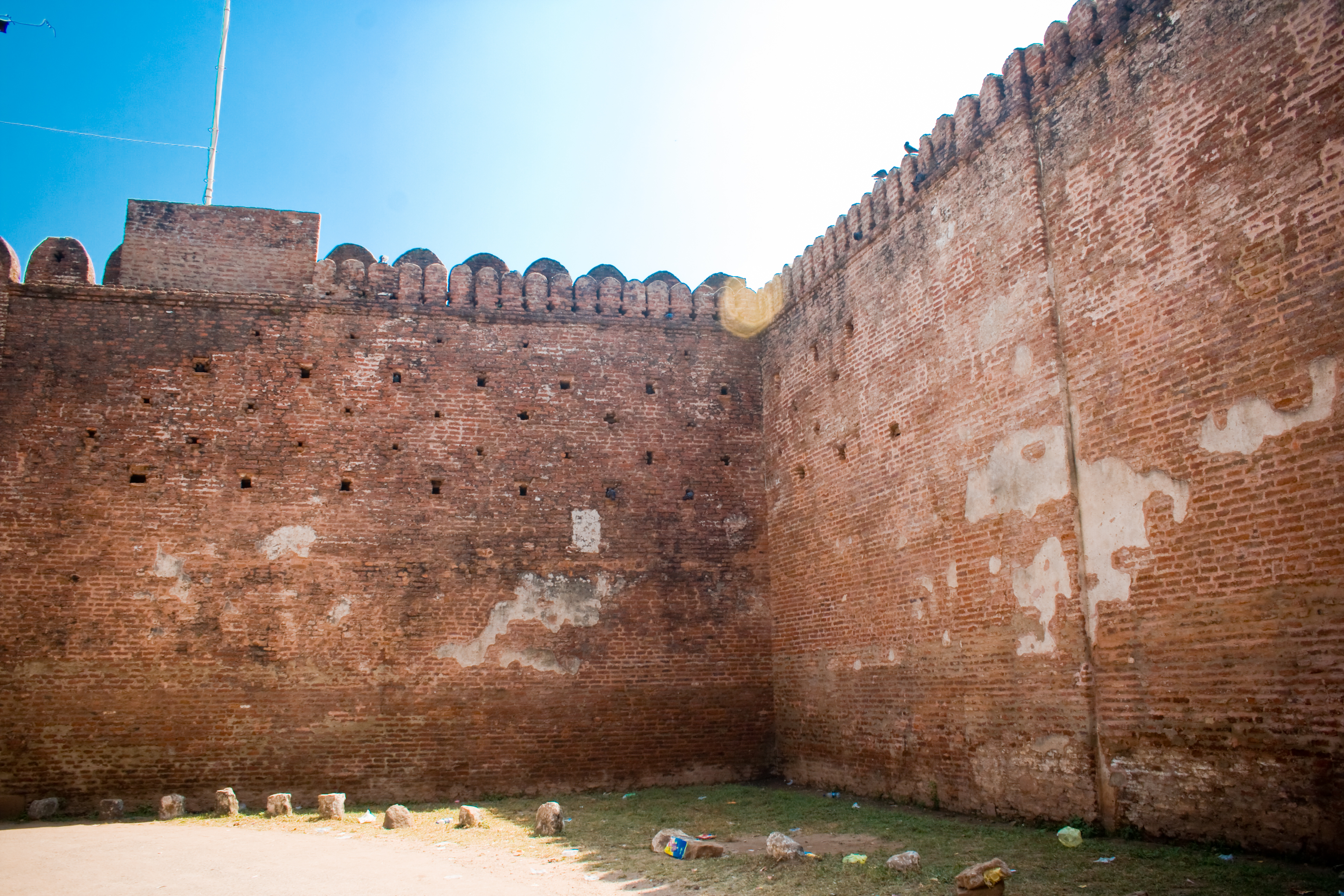
Citadel walls.

The fortress built by the Solanki kings of Gujarat was further fortified by Khichi Chauhans. In 1484, Sultan Mahmud Begadah captured the fort and renamed it Muhammadabad Champaner. The fortifications start on the Mauliya plateau, which is situated on the hill and ends on the plains. They are very large and are built with sandstone walls connected with bastions at intervals and have elegant balconies. There are several gates in the fortifications and the enclosed area within also have barracks and jails. The west gate has fortifications running from the ridge to the north built of brick and cement, followed by a freely laid stone wall for about a mile, then followed by a second line of old wall (of 30 feet (9.1 m) height) which extends 220 yards (200 m) and rises to join the first line (known as atak) of fortifications on the hill. The huge wall of free stone is known as Bigada's wall, and encloses the Jahapanah (the world shelter) and the Bhadar or the citadel of Mahmudabad Champaner; the area enclosed by this fortification is 1 mile (1.6 km) long and 280 yards (260 m) wide. A rectangular building at the approach to the citadel is a guard room of size 150 feet (46 m)x1120 feet (37 m) with double gates, which has windows made of stone that are embellished with intricate carvings. Shikari Kot or Hunters Fort is located to the east of the Citadel. The Bada Talao or the Great Lake is next to the ruins of the palace.

=== Temples ===
The earliest temple on Pavagadh hill in the Mauliya plateau is dated to the 10th–11th century and is dedicated to Lakulish. However, the temple is in ruins, with only the gudha mandapa (sanctum sanctorum) and Ardha mandapa part of the antarala now present. Lakulish, Dakshinmurthi, Brahma, Vishnu, Gajendramoksha, various forms of Shiva, Indra, seated Ambika and Surasundaris are the images seen in this temple. The temple was built in the Hindu temple architecture style of architecture with garbhagriha, mandapa and an entrance porch. It had ornate decorations, mostly consisting of stone carvings. While this oldest temple is in a dilapidated condition and not in use, all the other temples are used as places of worship. They have ornate decorations, mostly stone carvings.

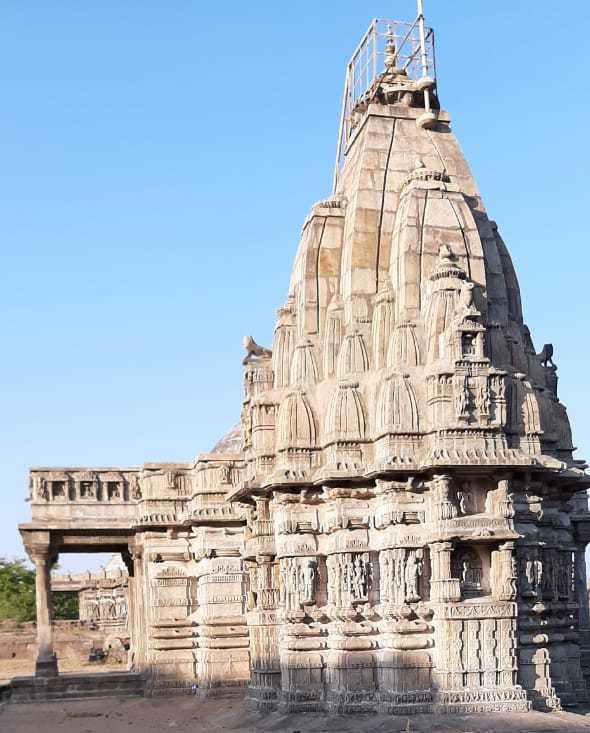
Jain temples, Pavagadh

The temples of the Jain religion at Pavagadh are also noteworthy. They are of three different groups: The first consists of the Bhavanaderi temples near Naqqarkhana gate called the Navalakka temples, the second group is in honour of the Tirthankaras Suparshvanatha and Chandraprabha and the third group, situated on the southeast of Pavagarh Hill (Mataji's cliff), is near the Pārśva temple next to the Dudhia tank. These temples are deduced to have been constructed in the 14th–15th centuries on the basis of "[their] stylistic and architectural features". Elaborately carved seated and standing images of the Jain pantheon are seen on the outer walls of the temples. The Garbabrihas are enshrined with beautiful stone images of Tirthankaras in these temples. All the temples have been renovated over time.

The most visited temple on the hill is the Kalika Mata Temple. It has three images of goddesses: the central image is of Kalika Mata, flanked by Kali on the right and Bahuchara Mata on the left. The spire of this temple carries a shrine of Sadanandsha pir, a Muslim saint held in great reverence in the region. It is the third of the major Shakta pithas of Gujarat and is known for tantric worship. It is connected by a mono-cable ropeway 740 metres (2,430 ft) in length which can carry 1200 people per hour and is stated to be the country's highest ropeway. On Chaitra ashtami, during navratri (nine-day festival), a fair is held at the Kalika Mata temple which is attended by thousands of devotees. The ruins of Patai Raval's palace can be seen on the way to the temple.

=== Mosques ===
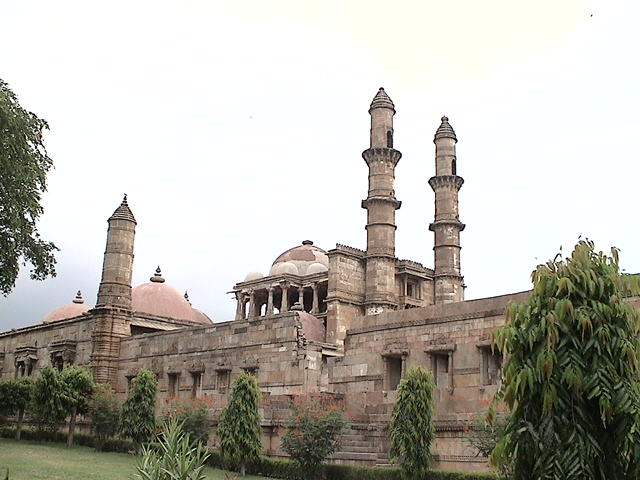
Jami Masjid

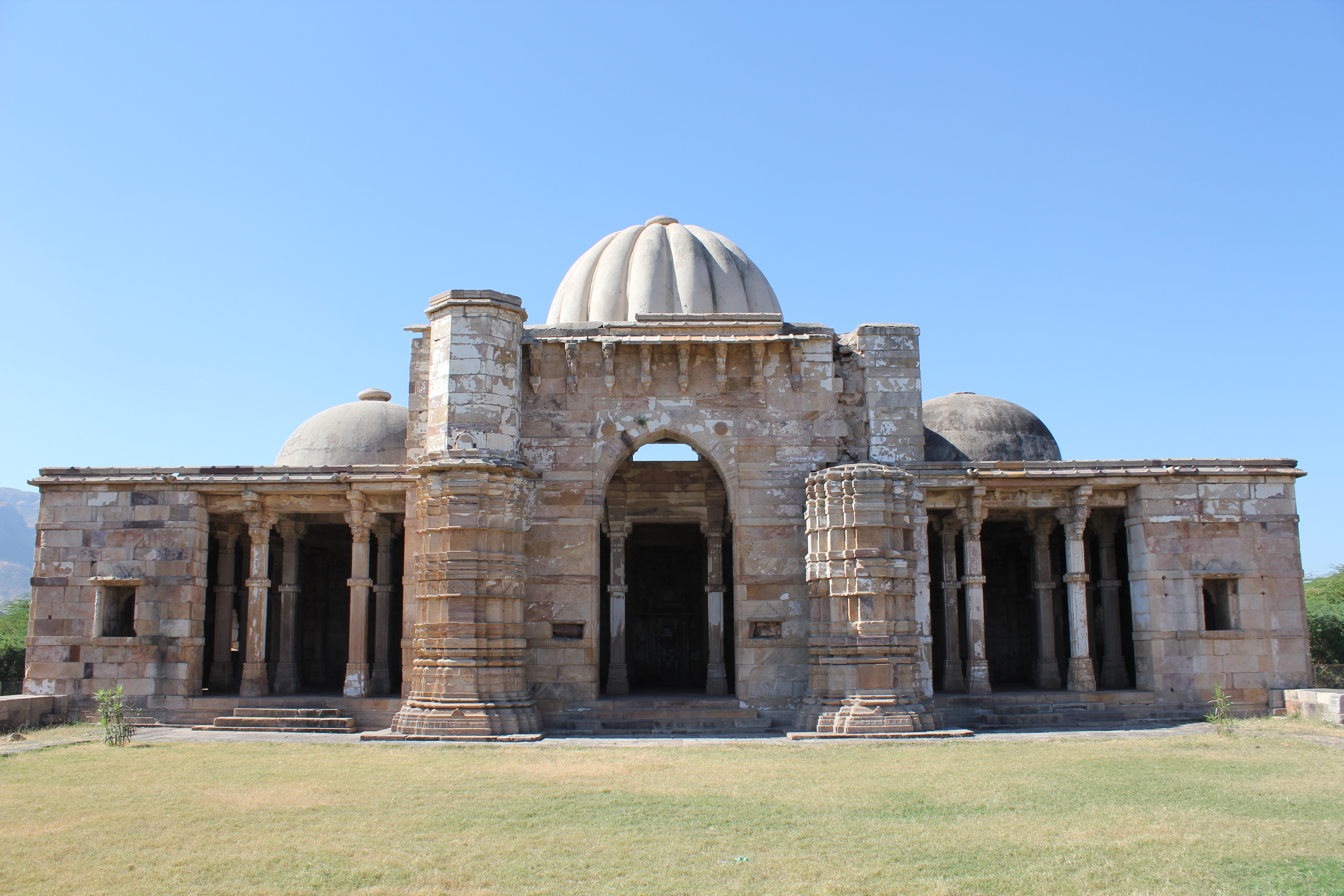
Lili Gumbaz Masjid

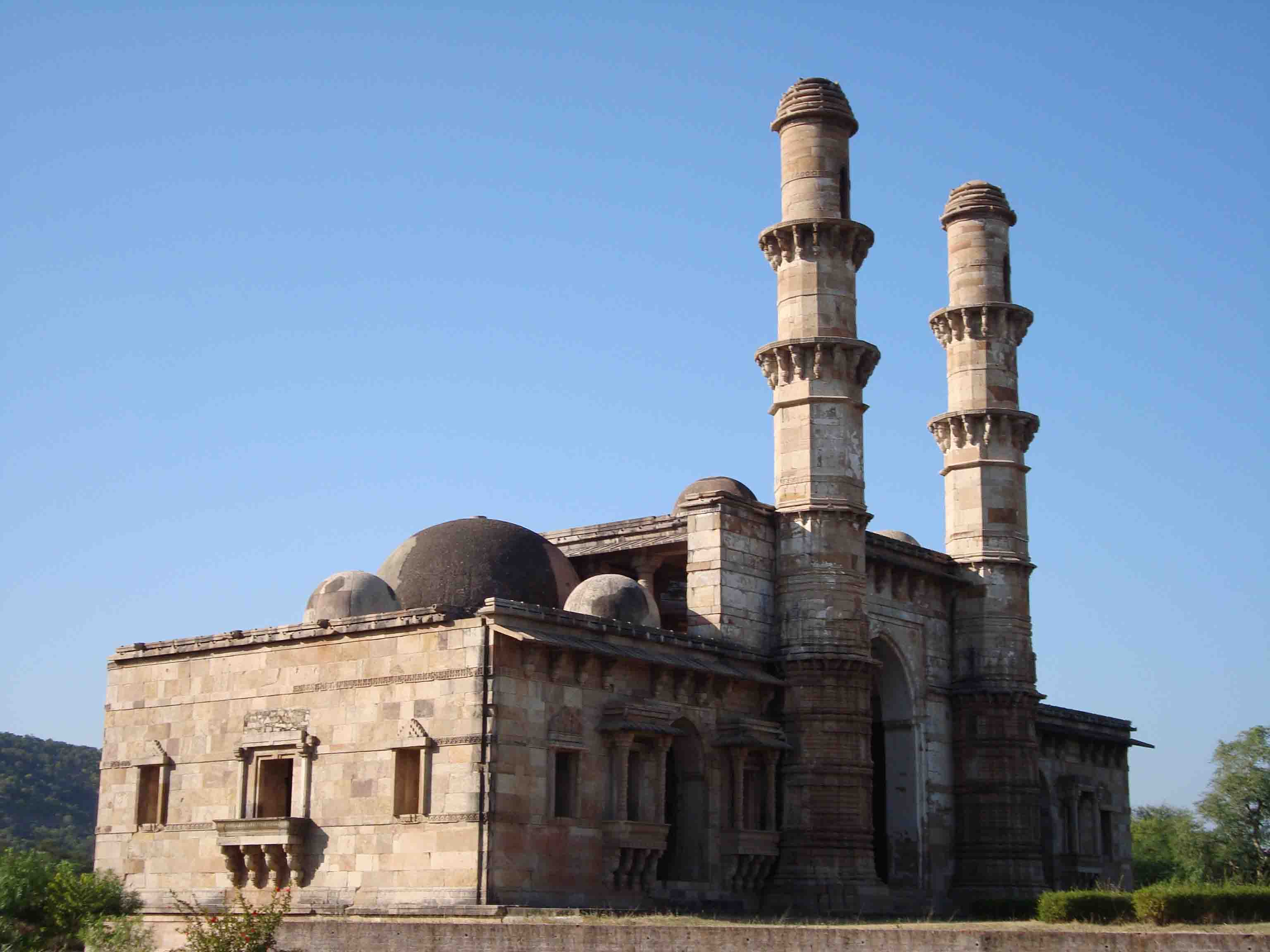
Kevada Masjid

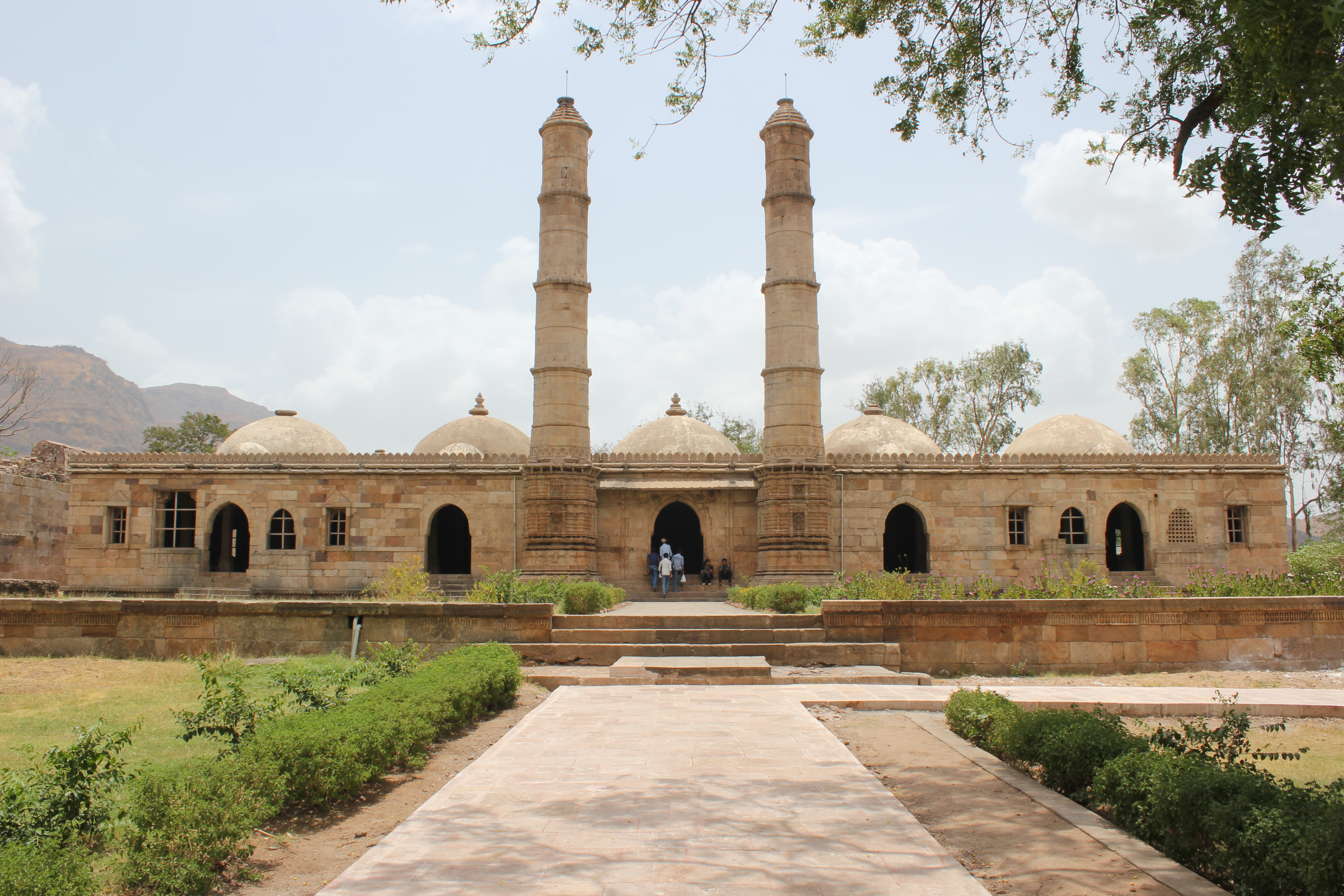
Sahar ki Masjid

Among the five mosques in very good condition, the Jami Masjid (also spelled "Jama Masjid") near the east gate, built by Sultan Begada, is one of the most notable among the 114 monuments listed by the Baroda Heritage Trust. It has a blend of Hindu and Muslim architecture preserving the Islamic ethos and with its elegant interiors is considered one of the finest mosques in Western India. The masjid is built over a high plinth, has a central dome, two minarets each 30 metres (98 ft) high, 172 pillars, seven mihrabs and ornately carved entry gates fitted with stone jalis. The Mughal architecture is said to have drawn from the architecture of the Sultanates, which is a blend of Hindu religious connotations and workmanship with Muslim ethos; the large domes are indicative of such a mix. In the Jami Masjid, the ornamentation of the surface areas of the mosque and tomb consists of symbols of motifs of the Sun, diamonds, pots and vines, and lotus insignia which were used in the earlier temples. This mosque has three mural plaques, in oblong shape, one at the top of the pulpit and the other two on the sides with engravings of hymns from the Koran. Of the two minarets, one was damaged by an intentional gun firing in 1812 by Patankar, a Scindia Governor.

Other notable mosques in the heritage area are: the Kevada Masjid, the Ek Minarka Masjid (single dome mosque); the Panch Mahuda ka masjid (five-domed mosque) in a forested area; the Shehrka Masjid (city mosque), an elegant structure located inside the citadel; and the Nagina Masjid (jewel mosque), about 0.75 miles (1.21 km) to the south of the citadel, built with pure white stone; a stepwell decorated with arches is close to this mosque. Tombs have been built adjacent to mosques, invariably to a square plan with columns and domes erected over them, and also embellished with decorations. The tomb of Sikander Shah seen near Halol is a simple single storied building in Muslim architectural style. The shrine of Khon pir, a saint, a colourful tomb, was a place of worship of the weaver community (Muslims known as Tais) of Champaner.

=== Palaces ===
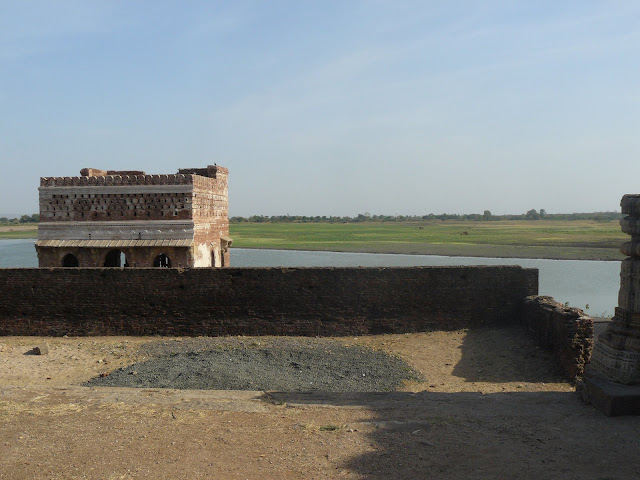
Kabutarkhana Pavilion

The custom house was probably used as a guard room. It is well planned in a square shape with five rows of arches and five equal colonnaded aisles. From this location to the east gate, the view of present-day Champaner consists of shabby houses on a lone street. Kabutarkhana Pavilion is situated on the north bank of Bada Talao near Khajuri Masjid. Another building with columns is also located on the Pavagadh Hill, above the roof of the Mahakali temple.

== Vandalism ==
On evening of June 16, 2024, an incident of severe vandalism was reported to have happened on the hill. Several Tirthankara idols cemented on the sides of the steps on the old path to reach the Kalika Mata shrine were desecrated and broken down. Local Jains and monks spearheaded protest at the local collector's office. The protest continued overnight into June 17, 2024. Most desecrated idols were over 400 years old, some even more ancient and belong exclusively to the Śvetāmbara sect.

== Bibliography ==
- Silverman, Helaine; Ruggles, D. Fairchild (2008). Cultural heritage in a globalized world. Springer. pp. 56–60. ISBN 978-0-387-76579-2.
