= Jain temples, Pavagadh =

Temple complex in Pavagadh Hill, Gujarat

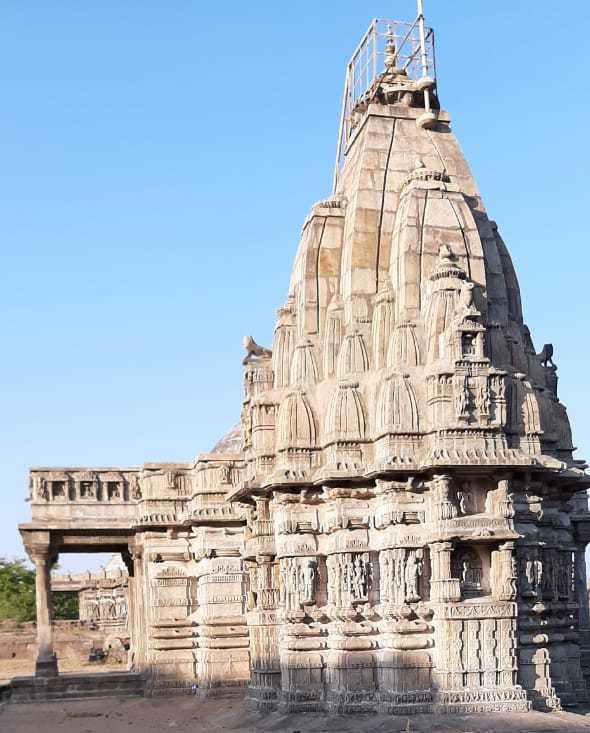
- Parshvanatha temple

Religion
- Affiliation: Jainism
- Sect: Originally Svetambara later converted by Digambara
- Deity: Rishabhanatha, Parshvanatha, Chandraprabha, Suparshvanatha
- Festival: Mahavir Janma Kalyanak

Location
- Location: Pavagadh, Gujarat
- Interactive map of Jain temples, Pavagadh
- Coordinates: 22°29′05″N 73°32′02″E

Architecture
- Creator: Vastupala minister of the Solanki Vaghela ruler of Gujaratra
- Established: 13th century
- Temple: 11
- UNESCO World Heritage Site
- Official name: Champaner-Pavagadh Archaeological Park
- Criteria: Cultural: (iii)(iv)(v)(vi)
- Designated: 2004 (session)
- Reference no.: 1101

Jain temples, Pavagadh is a group of seven Śvetāmbara Jain temples located on Pavagadh Hill in the state of Gujarat. These temples are part of the UNESCO World Heritage Site of Champaner-Pavagadh Archaeological Park.

== Jain tradition ==
Pavagadh Hill is considered one of the four sacred regions where moksha can be attained.

== History ==
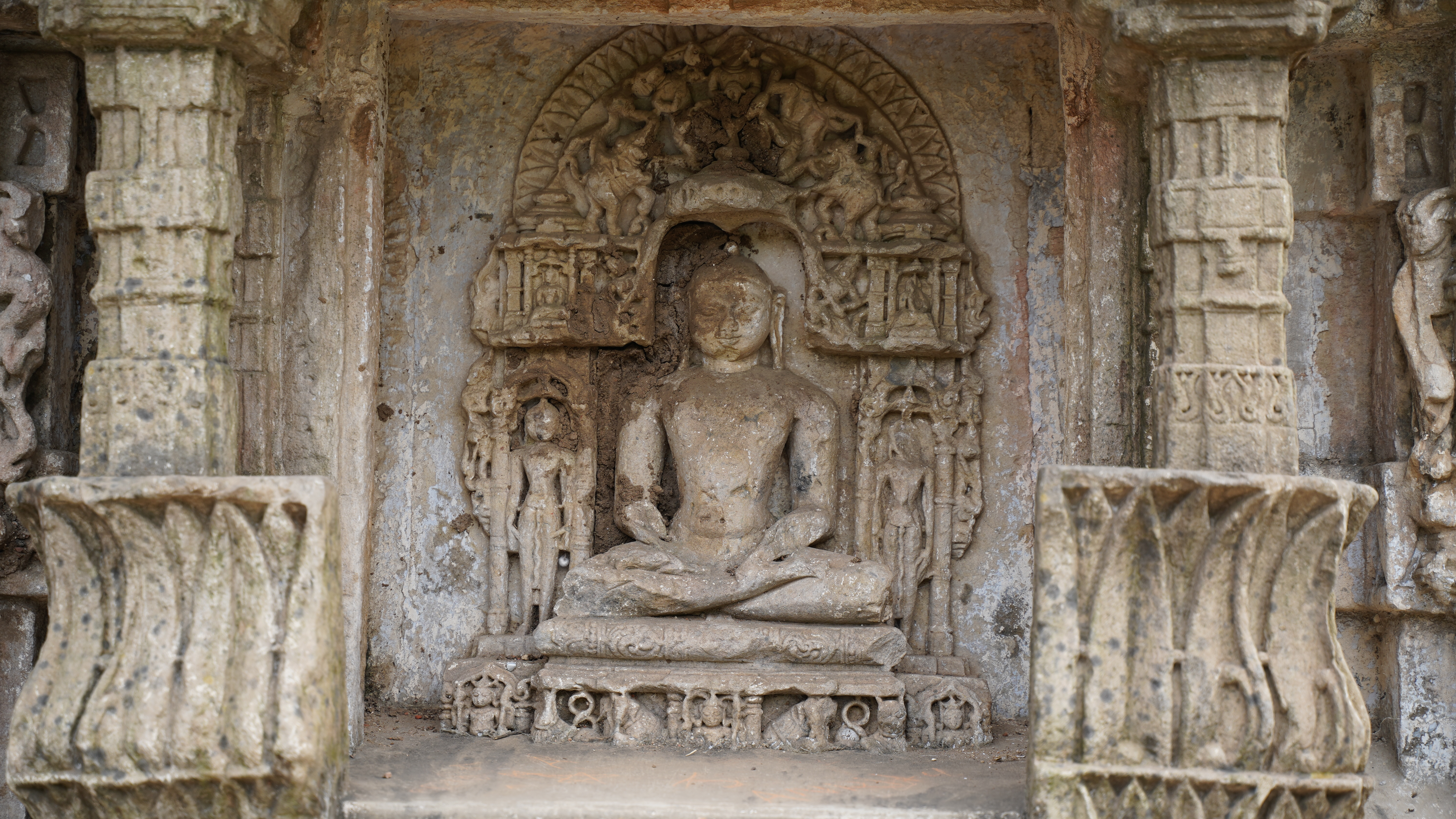
An idol of a Tirthankara depicting Śvetāmbara iconography (with a waistband and a piece of cloth in the middle and below the folded legs) on the outer walls of a Jain temple at Pavagadh Hill

Pavagadh has historically been a Śvetāmbara Jain pilgrimage site. There have been several attempts to destroy evidence of its Jain heritage. However, a court ordered against the destruction of facts and heritage. Its Jain history dates back to 3rd century BC.

1. King Samprati, in the 3rd century BC, constructed and installed the idol of Sambhavnatha which was consecrated by Svetambara Jain monk Acharya Suhastisuri.
2. In 1055 AD, Śvetāmbara monk Acharya Gunsagarsuri consecrated a new temple of Jirawala Parshvanath and reconstructed an ancient 52-shrine temple of Abhinandanswami.
3. In the 10th century AD, the Achalgacch of the Śvetāmbara sect of Jainism was established here by Acharya Aryarakshitsuri. He was unhappy with the wrong practices that had crept into the conduct of Jain monks due to the influence of yatis. He attempted reforms, but failed. Therefore, he ascended the hill to perform Sallekhana. Legend says that demi-goddess Mahakali appeared before him and requested the Acharya not to perform Sallekhana and said that he was the only one who could spread the truth. She asked him to start a new order based on the truth of the Agamas and assured him that she would safeguard the lay-followers of the new order and that they would prosper. Thus, in 1112 AD, Acharya Aryarakshitsuri founded the Achalgacch (or Viddhipaksh) at Pavagadh, and installed demi-goddess Mahakali as the adhishthayika (transl. protecting deity) of the gaccha. The founder Śrāvakas of the gaccha installed the idol of Mahakali on the hill to mark their respects. This is the idol and the shrine which was later encroached upon by Hindus.
4. There is a reference to a temple called "Sarvatobhadra" (transl. auspicious on all sides) built by Minister Tejpal, an adherent of the Śvetāmbara sect in the 12th century CE.
5. Ceremonial installation and consecration of a temple built by Jayawant Seth by Acharya Vijaysensuri, a Śvetāmbara monk, in 1581 AD.
6. Under guidance of Acharya Kalyansagarsuri, a monk and reformer of the Śvetāmbara subsect known as Achalgacch, sravakas Sheth Vardhaman and Sheth Padamshin reconstructed the shrine of Mahakali in 16th century AD.
7. In 1689 AD, Gani Shilvijay Maharaj, a Śvetāmbara ascetic, has referred to the existence of a temple of Neminatha.
8. In a laudatory poem dedicated to Jirawala Parshvanatha and composed by Śvetāmbara Jain monk Dipvijay Kaviraaj in late 18th century AD, the temples existing here are described in detail.

Several monks of the Śvetāmbara Achalgacch such as Mahendraprabhasuri, Merutungasuri, and Jaykesarisuri amongst many, and those of the Tapagacch such as Dharmaratnasuri, Hemvimalsuri, Laxmisagarsuri, Bhuvansundarsuri etc. consecrated numerous temples and idols on the hill. According to several Śvetāmbara scriptures, at one time, these shrines were considered to be of equal rank and importance as those atop the hill at Palitana.

== Temples ==
The Pavagadh temples are famous for their architecture and are also part of the UNESCO World Heritage Site of Champaner-Pavagadh Archaeological Park. Pavagadh has three Jain temples complexes that includes a total of seven Jain temples, a dharamshala and an old-age home. The three Jain complexes are Bavanderi or Naulakhi temples, Chandraprabha and Suparshvanatha temple and group around Parshvanatha temple. Bavanderi Naulakhi temples are the ruins of subsidiary shrines of a once large Chaumukhi temple with entrances in four cardinal direction. The pillars inside the temple having carvings that bear a resemblance to Luna Vasahi. Chandraprabha and Suparshvanatha temples are two small temples built near Kalika Mata temple. Parshvanatha temple is the main temple in this group and is surrounded by ruins of small temples.

These temples are visited by over 22 lakh visitors annually with 1 lakh devotees visiting daily during navaratri fair.

== Issues and controversy ==
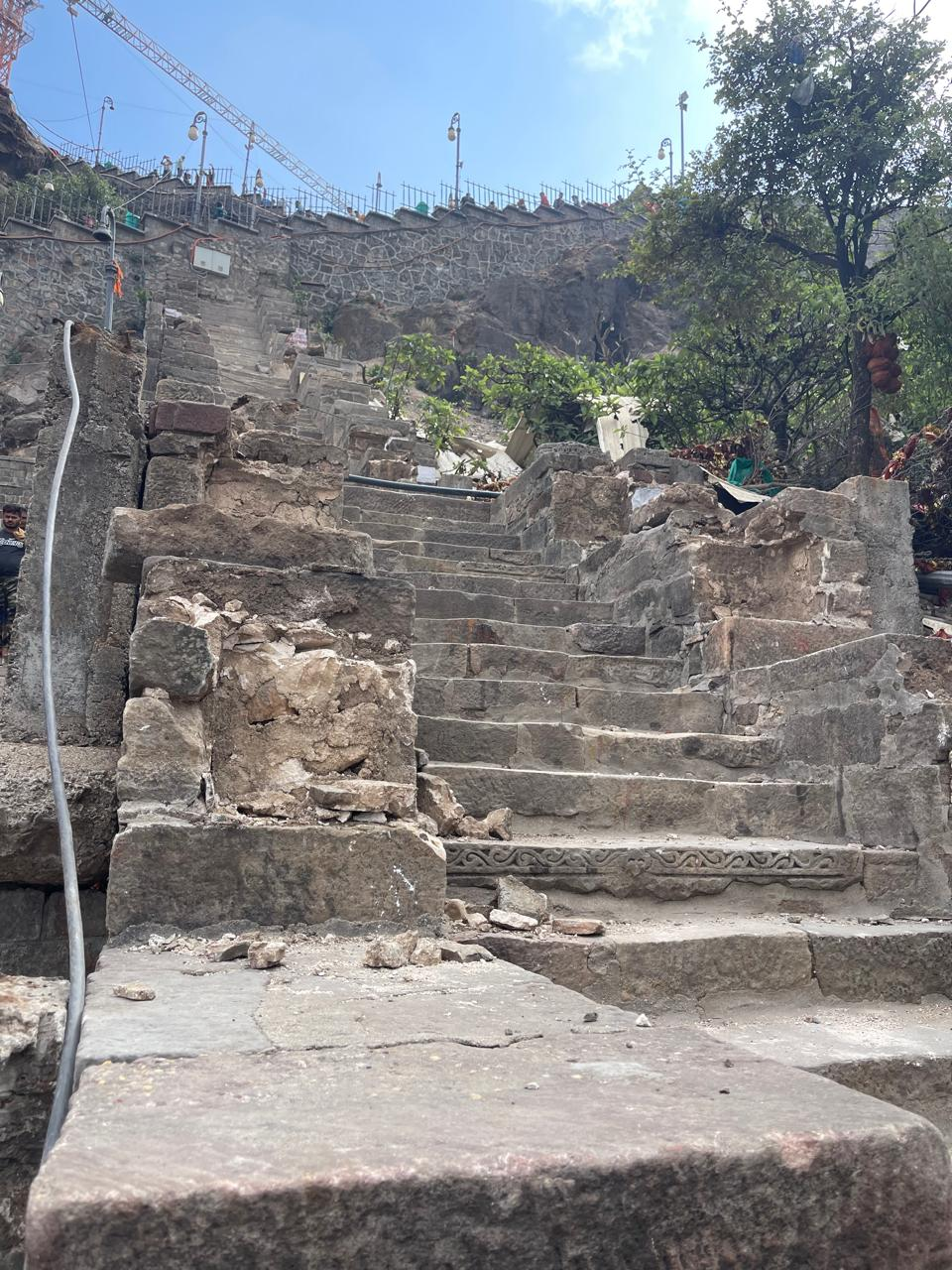
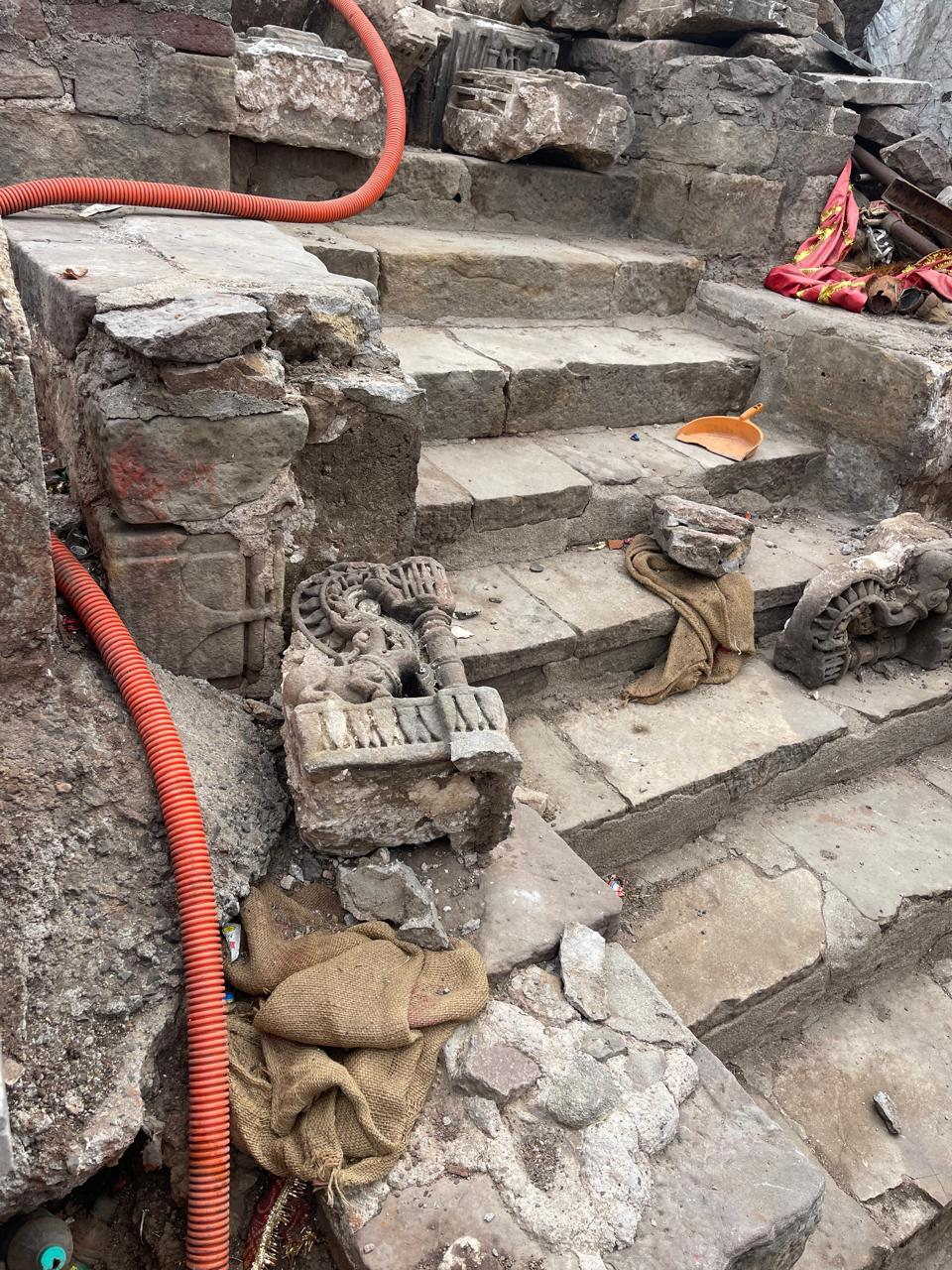
Desecration of Jain idols at Pavagadh on June 16, 2024

On June 16, 2024, an incident of severe vandalism was reported to have happened on the hill. Several Tirthankara idols at the sides of the staircase on the old path to reach the Kalika Mata shrine were desecrated and broken down. Jain monk Jinpremvijaya spearheaded a peaceful but powerful protest at the local collector's office where local Jains turned up in huge numbers. The protest is said to have begun at the evening of June 16, 2024 and went on overnight into June 17, 2024. Most desecrated idols were over 400 years old, some even ancient and belonged exclusively to the Svetambara sect.

== Gallery ==
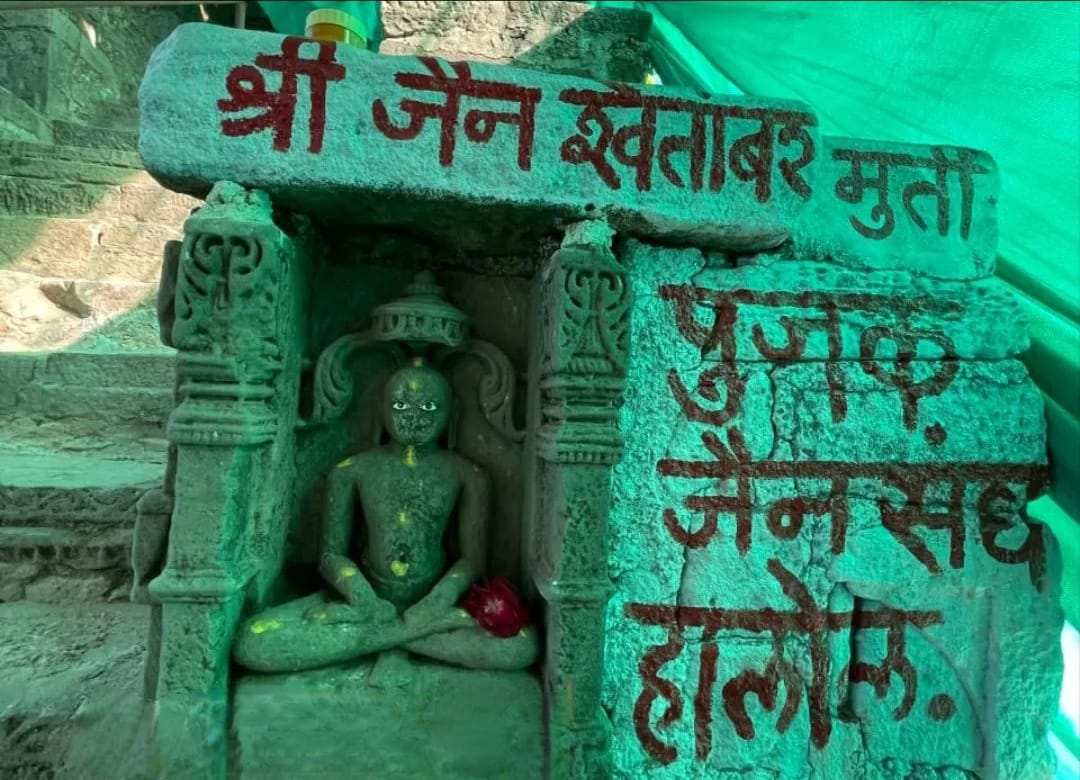
Śvetāmbara idol on Pavagadh hills

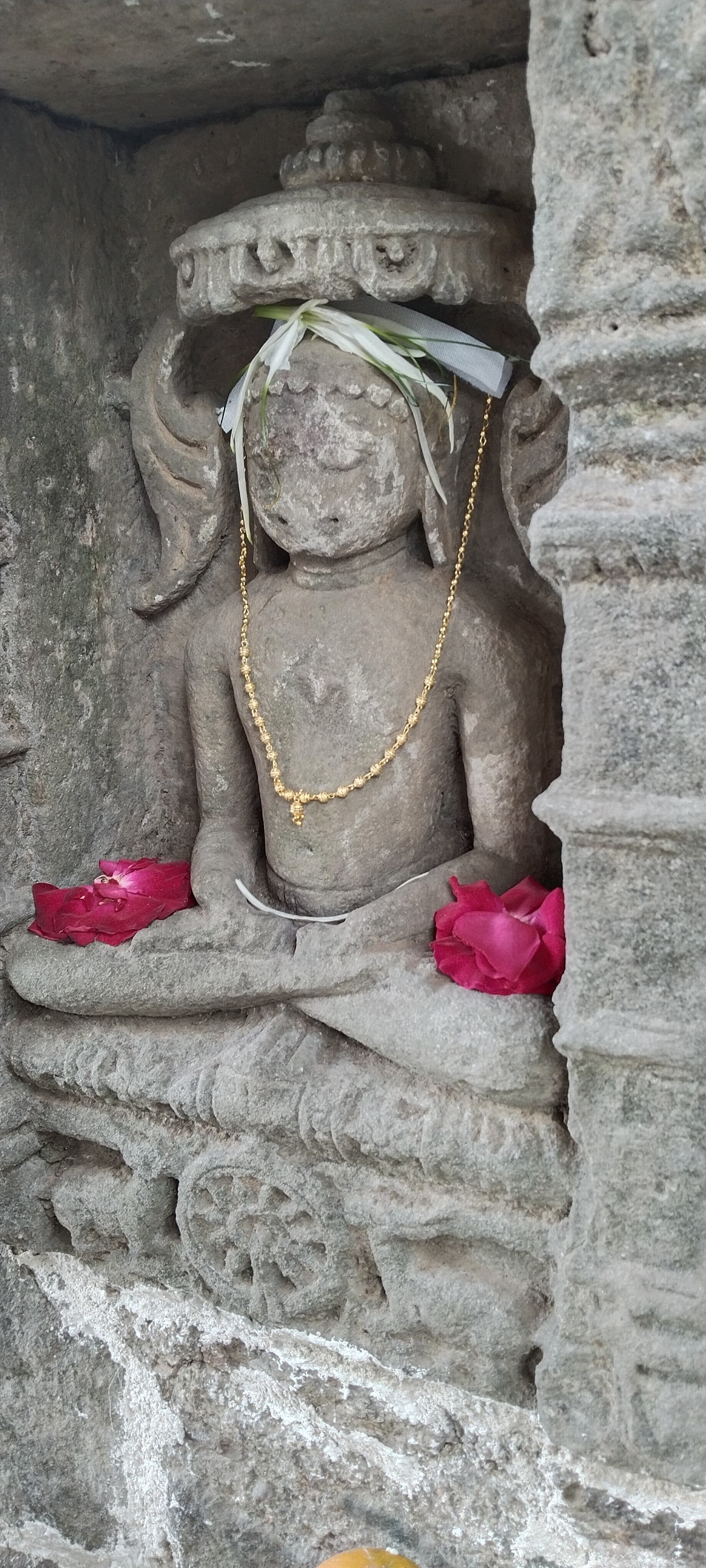
Śvetāmbara idol on Pavagadh hills

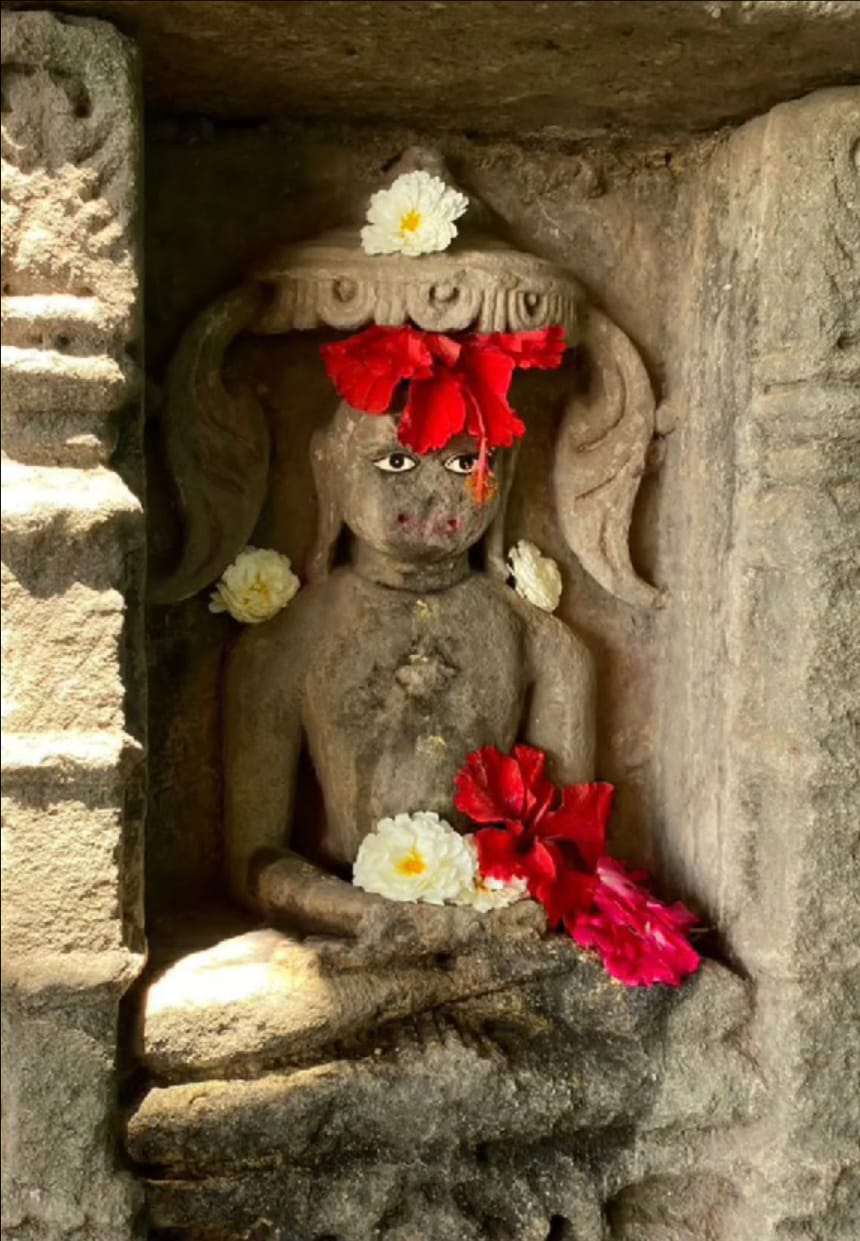
Śvetāmbara idol on Pavagadh hills

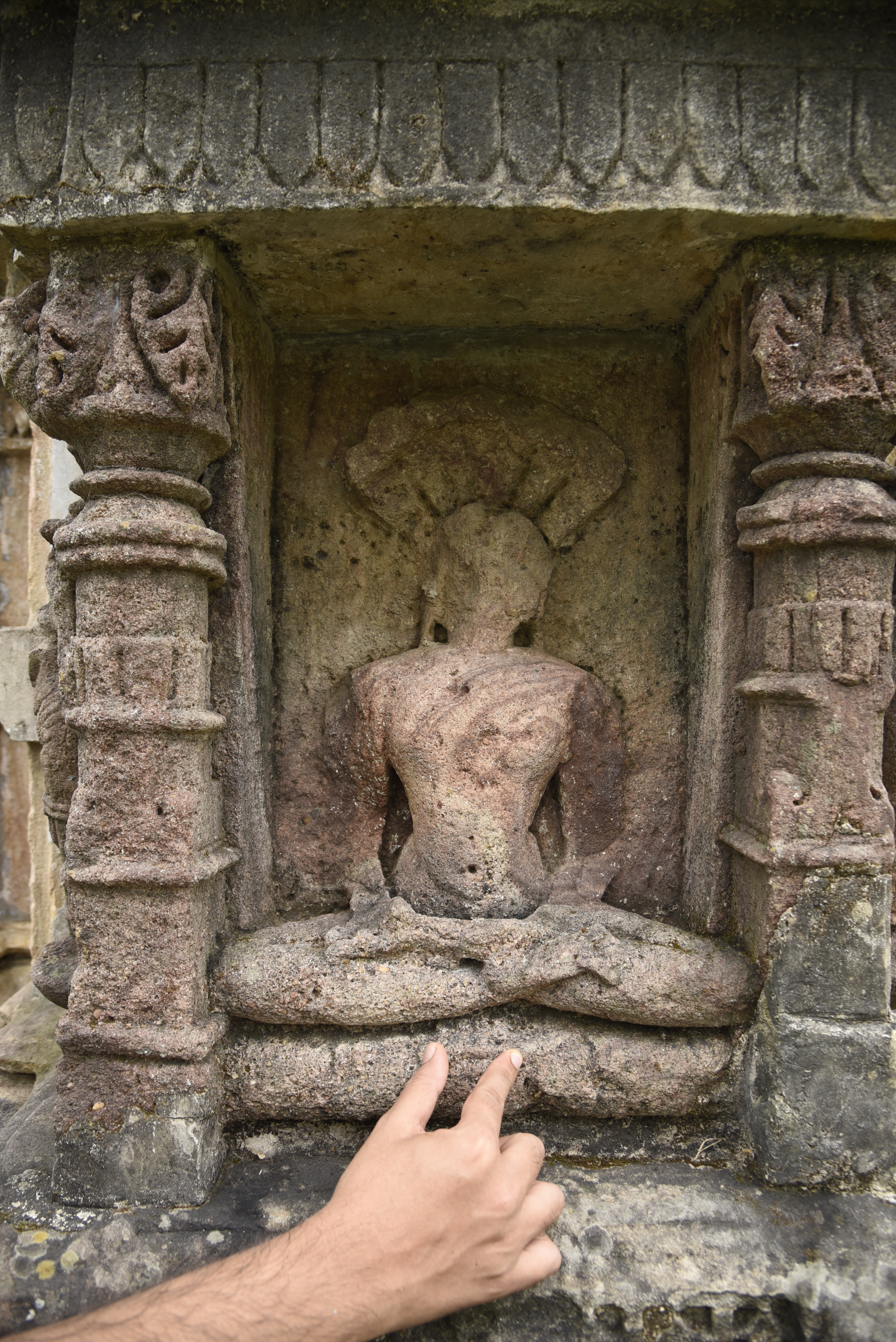
Parshvanatha depicting Śvetāmbara iconography (with a piece of cloth carved below the folded legs) on the outer walls of a Jain temple on Pavagadh Hill

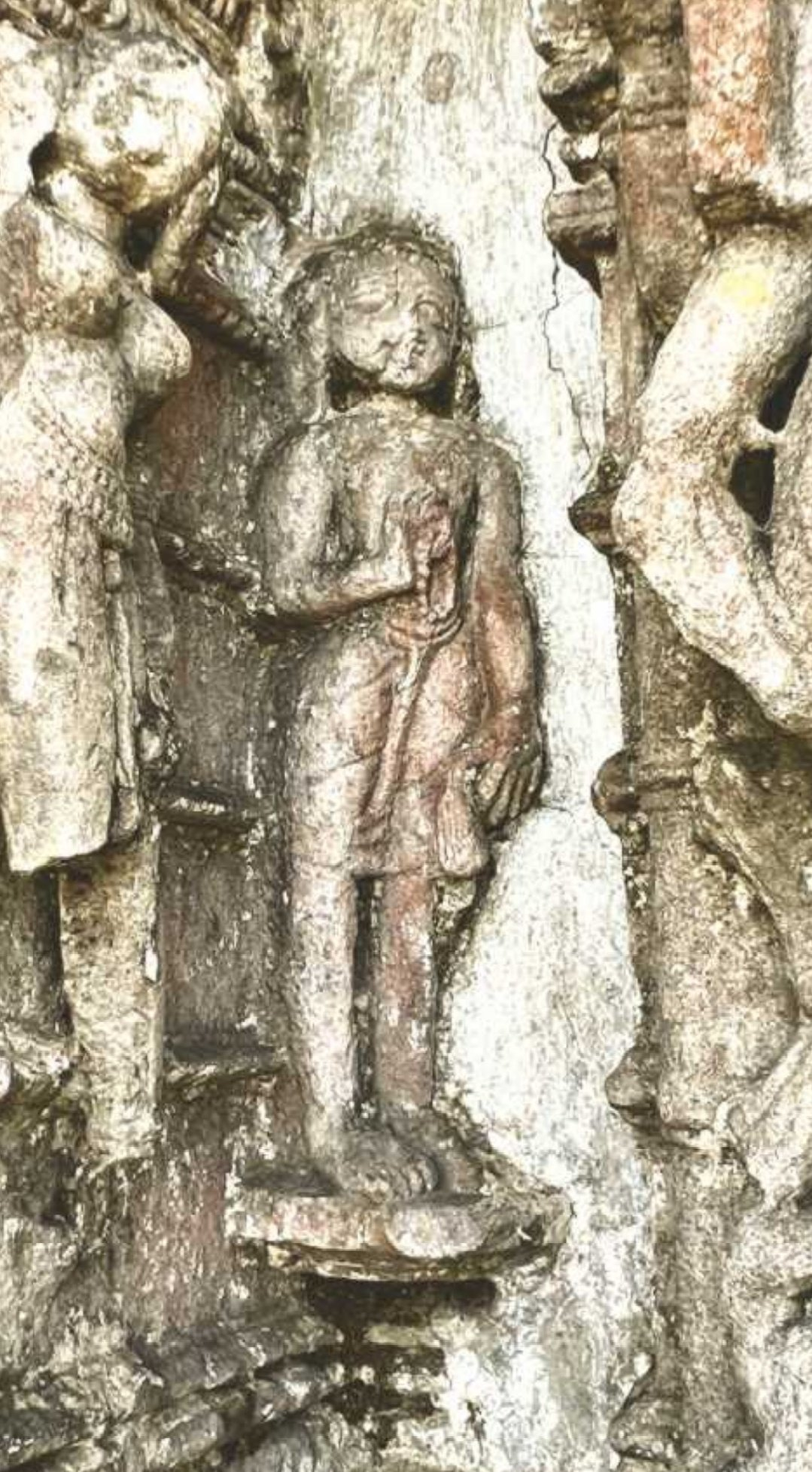
An idol of a Śvetāmbara monk wearing colpattā carved on the outer walls of a Jain temple at Pavagadh Hill

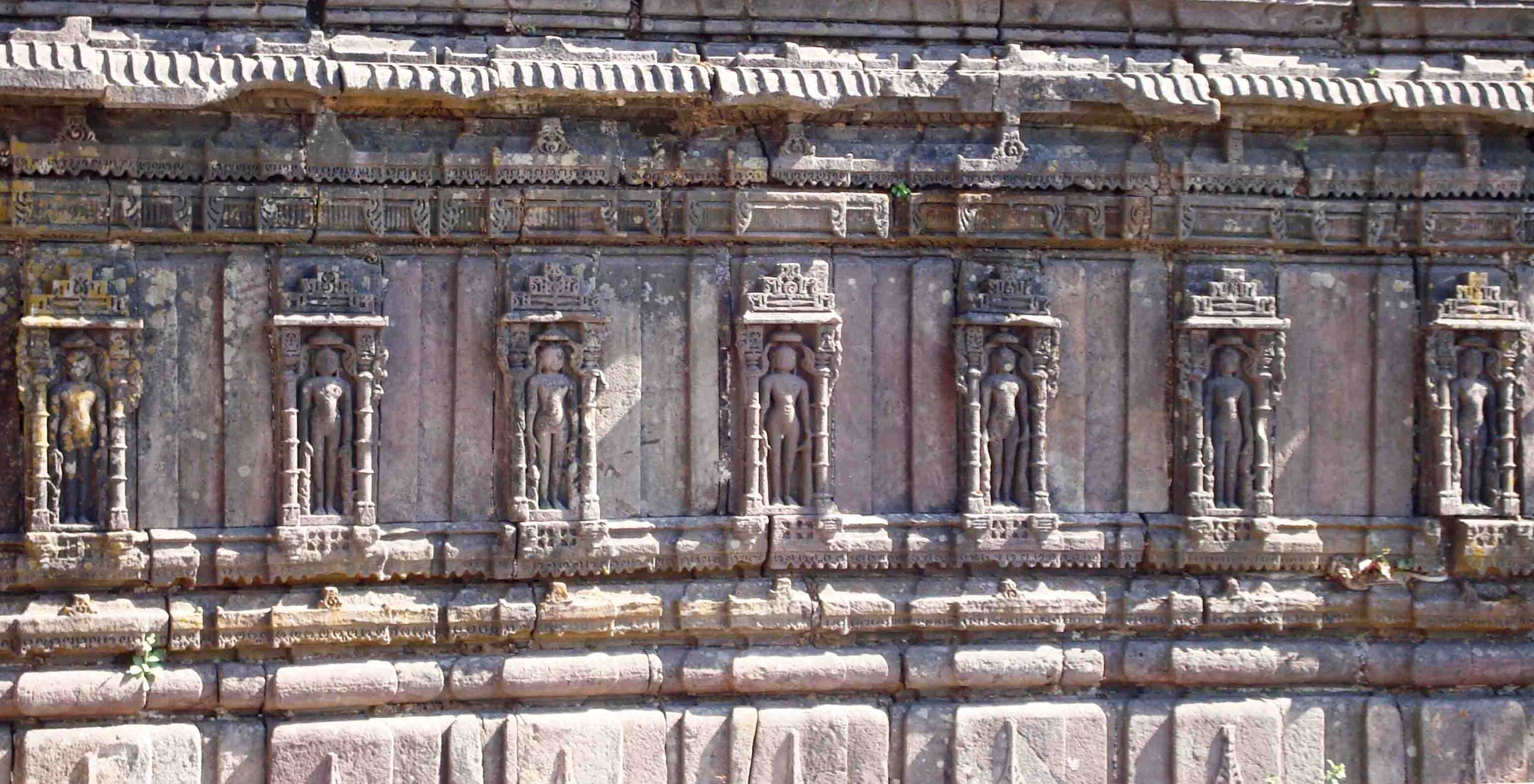
Carving of Jain Tirthankara on wall

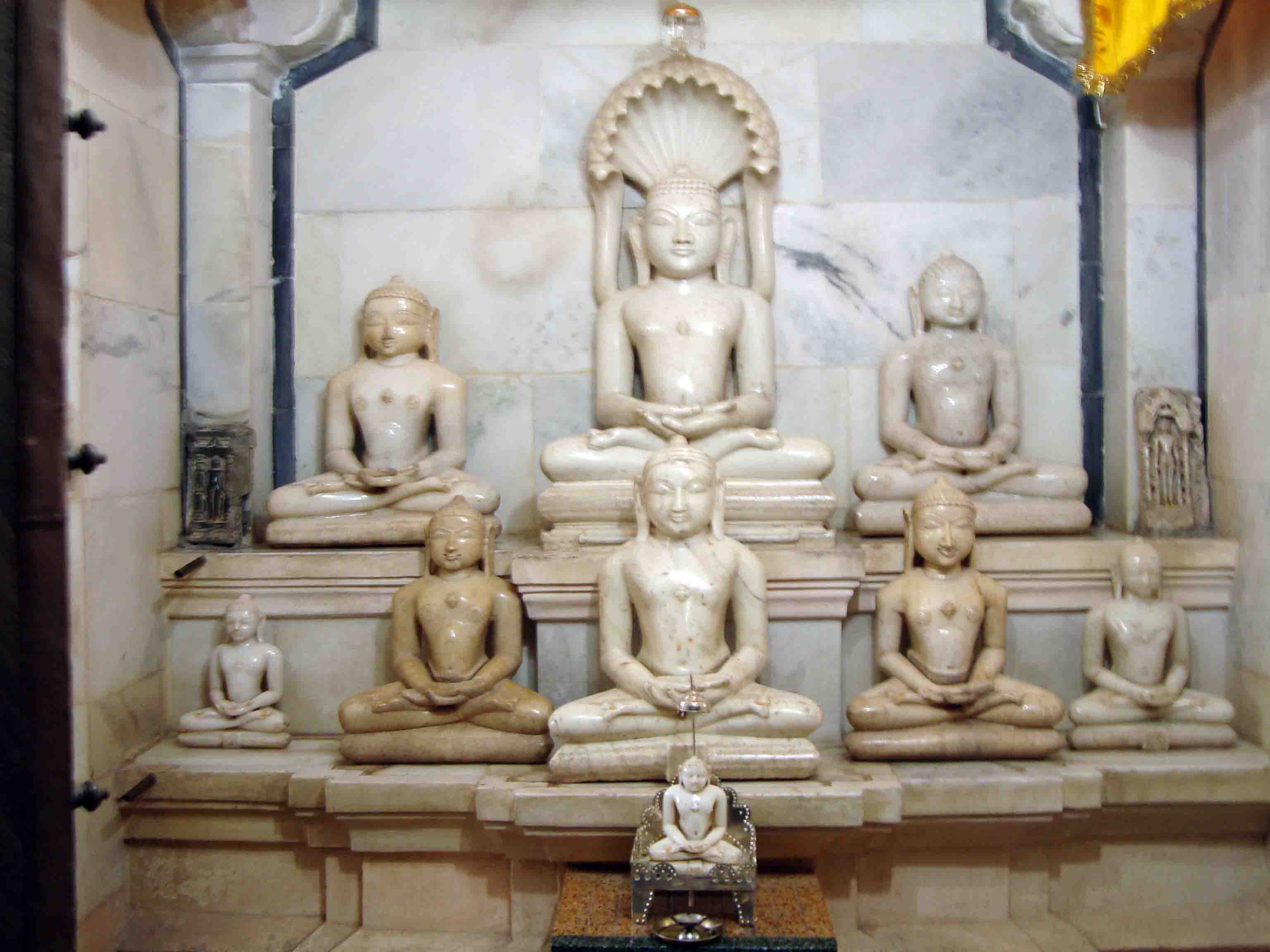
Main vedi Parshvanatha temple

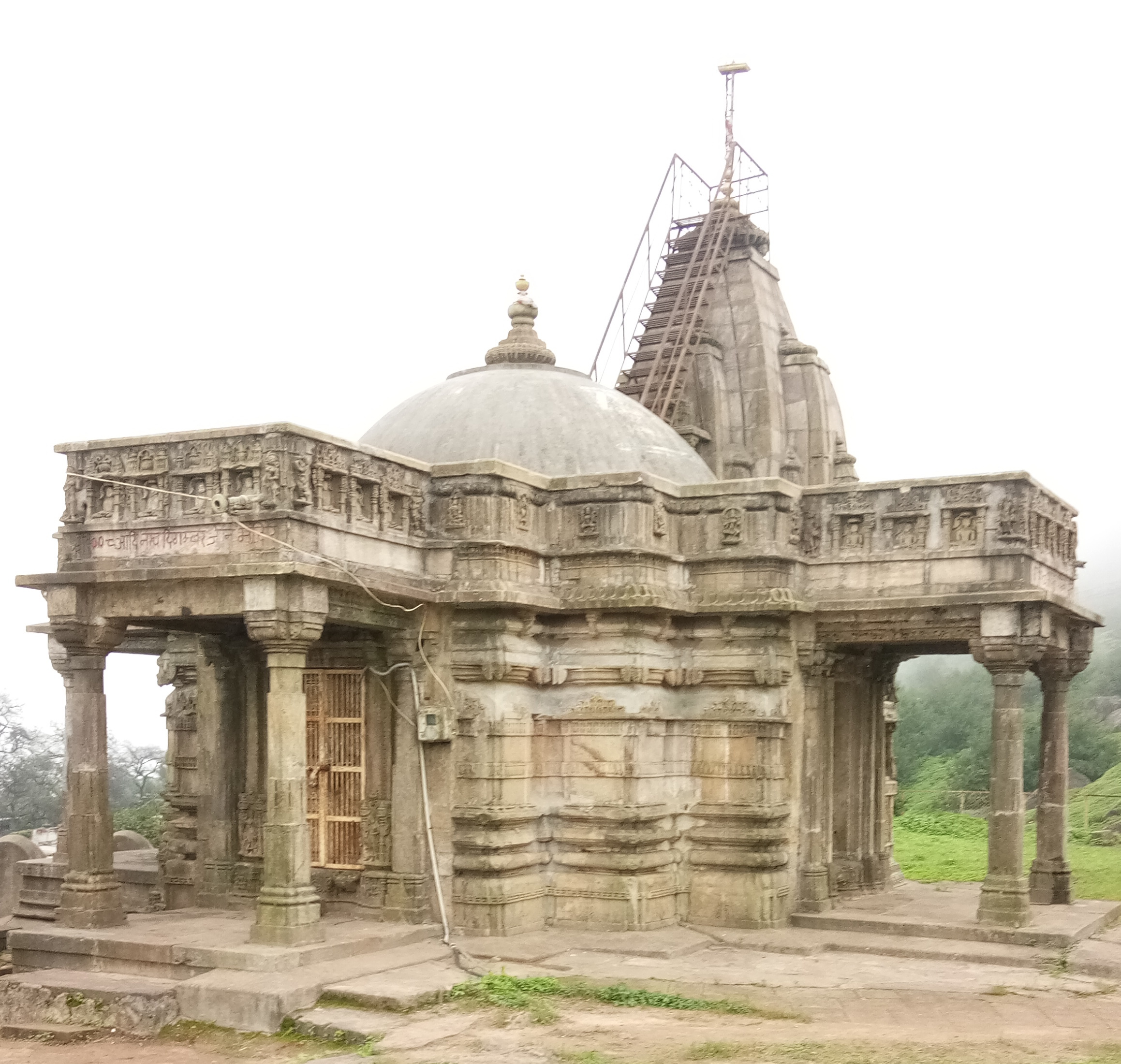
Chandraprabha temple

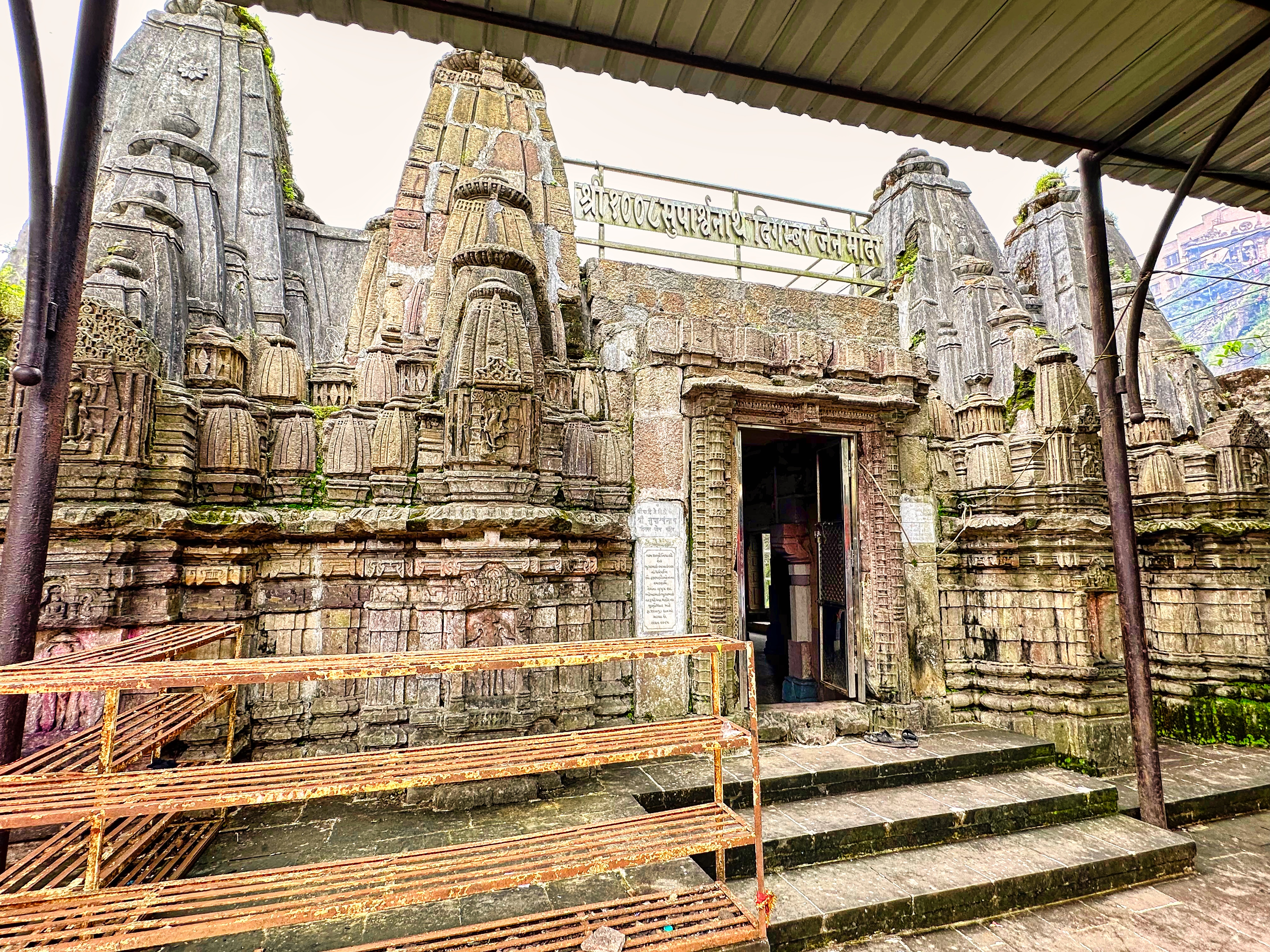
Suparshvanatha temple, the largest Jain temple on Pavagadh hill

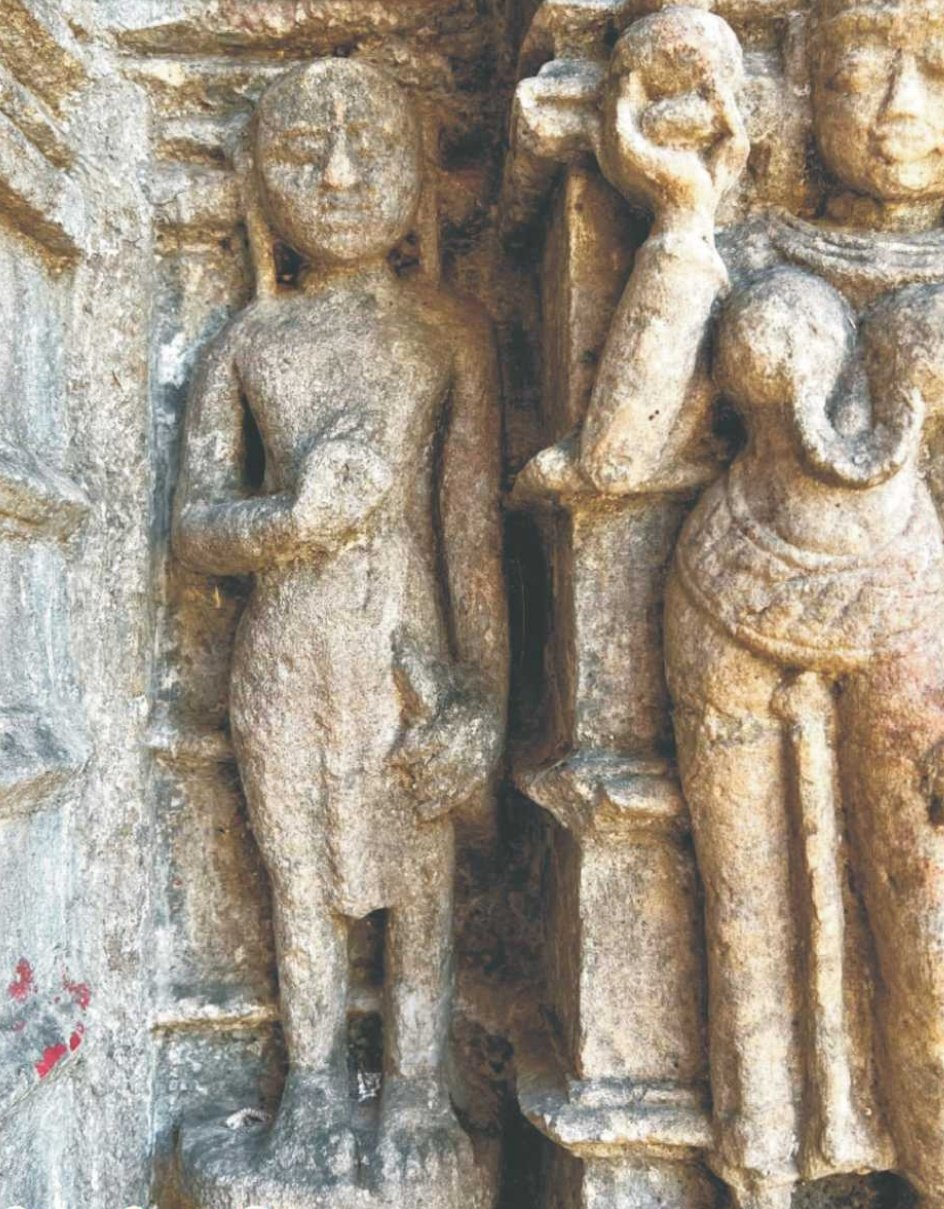
An idol of a Śvetāmbara monk draping a piece of cloth and holding a rajoharana carved on the outer walls of a Jain temple at Pavagadh Hill

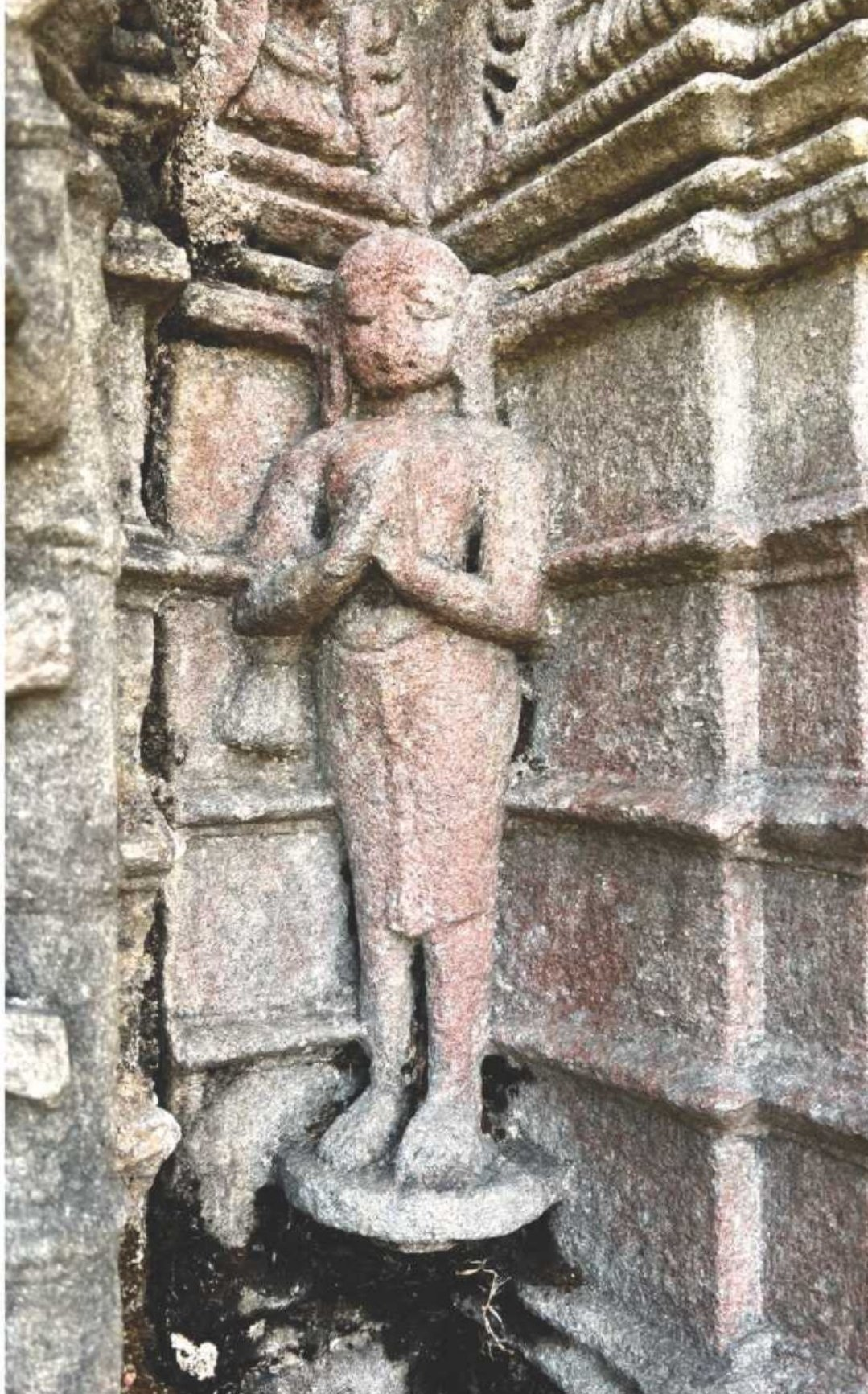
An idol of a Śvetāmbara monk wearing colpattā carved on the outer walls of a Jain temple at Pavagadh Hill

== See also ==
- Girnar Jain temples
- Jama Mosque, Champaner
