= Kalika Mata Temple, Pavagadh =

Hindu temple in India

Mahakali Mata Temple, Pavagadh
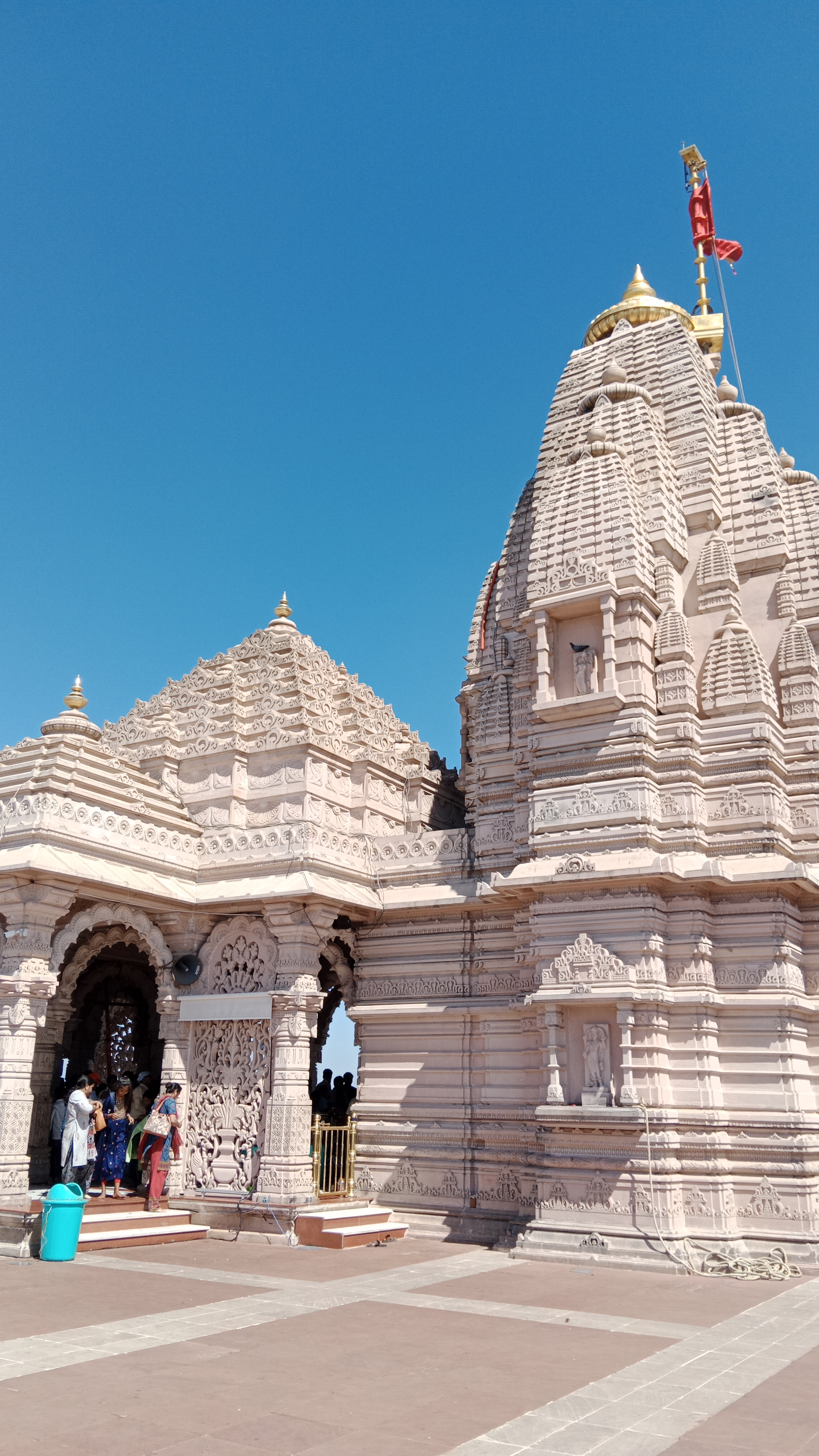
- Mahakali Mata Temple, Pavagarh

- Location in Gujarat Kalika Mata Temple, Pavagadh (India)

Religion
- Affiliation: Hinduism and Jainism
- District: Panchmahal
- Deity: Mahakali Mata
- Festival: Navaratri

Location
- Location: Pavagadh Hill
- State: Gujarat
- Country: India
- Coordinates: 22°27′40″N 73°30′42″E

Architecture
- Type: Nagara architecture
- Creator: Vishvamitra Rishi
- Completed: 10–11th centuries
- Elevation: 827–832 m (2,713–2,730 ft)

Mahakali Mata Temple (or Mahakalimata; lit. 'the great black Mother') is a Hindu goddess temple complex and pilgrim centre at the summit of Pavagadh Hill in Panchmahal District, India, with in the Champaner-Pavagadh Archaeological Park.

Here, She is worshipped in the form of Durga or Chandi. In the temple, the Kali Yantra is worshipped which dates to 10th or 11th century. The temple has three images of goddesses: the central image is of Mahakali Mata, flanked by Kali on the right and Bahucharamata on the left.

The idol of Mahakali originally belonged to the Achalgacch of Svetambara sect of Jains that was established on the hill in the 12th century, installing the Mahakali devi as the Adishtayika of the Achalgacch. Pavagadh was an ancient Jain pilgrimage centre.

On Chitra sud 8, a fair is held at the temple which is attended by thousands of devotees. The temple is the site of one of the 51 Great holy Shakta pithas. One can easily reach the temple by ropeway.

== Geography ==
Kalika Mata Temple is situated in the Indian state of Gujarat, near Halol, at 762 metres (2,500 ft) above sea level. The temple complex is part of the Champaner-Pavagadh Archaeological Park, a UNESCO World Heritage Site. It is set amidst a dense forest cover on a cliff.

The temple can be accessed by a pathway from the road head through the forest over a distance of 5 kilometres (3.1 mi). The path passes the ruins of Patai Raval's palace ruins. Alternatively, there is a Pavagadh ropeway access, which was commissioned in 1986.

== History ==
The Kali yantra is worshipped at Pavagadh's Kalika Mata Temple.

Dating from the 10th-11th centuries, Kalika Mata is the oldest temple in the area. According to R. K. Trivedi in Fairs and Festivals of Gujarat (1961), the goddess Kalika Mata was initially worshipped by the local Bhil and Koli People, When the toe of devi sati fell at the Pavagadh's highest tip at that time Maa Mahakali byself were self-installed here and has been installed since time and will sit here till eternity. Maa Mahakali is Adi Parashakti. Even Vishvamitra did taap (meditation) on Pavagadh Hill summit.

Pavagadh's Kalika Mata is also worshipped by the Adivasi. The temple was described in Gangadas Pratap Vilasa Natakam, a 15th-century drama. Named in honor of the Goddess Kali, the temple is believed to be the Kali Mata's residence, and is one of the Shakta pithas, as the right leg toe of the goddess Sati was fallen here.

Pavagadh was an ancient Jain pilgrimage. There were several attempts to destroy evidence of its Jain heritage with the latest attempt on 16 June 2024 when idols of the ancient Sopaan jinalaya were vandalised. Jains appealed in the court and the court passed an order not to destroy facts. Its Jain history dates back to 3rd century BC. Pavagadh's Jain history can be traced as: -

1. In 1055 CE, Śvetāmbara monk Acharya Gunsagarsuri consecrated a new temple of Jirawala Parshvanath and reconstructed an ancient 52-shrine temple of Abhinandanswami. This was when he also consecrated the idol of Mahakali goddess which was later converted and worshipped by Hindus.
2. In 12th century CE, the Achalgacch of the Śvetāmbara sect of Jainism was established here by Acharya Aryarakshitsuri. He was unhappy with the wrong practices that had crept into the conduct of Jain monks due to the influence of yatis. He attempted reforms, but failed. Therefore, he ascended the hill to perform Sallekhana. Legend says that demi-goddess Mahakali appeared before him and requested the Acharya to not perform Sallekhana and said that he was the only one who could spread the truth. She asked him to start a new order based on the truth of the Agamas and assured him that she would safeguard the lay-followers of the new order and that they would prosper. Thus, in 1113 CE, Acharya Aryarakshitsuri founded the Achalgacch (or Viddhipaksh) at Pavagadh, and installed demi-goddess Mahakali as the Adishthayika (transl. protecting deity) of the gaccha. The founder Śrāvakas of the gaccha installed the idol of Mahakali on the hill to mark their respects. This is the idol and the shrine which was later encroached upon by Hindus.
3. Under guidance of Acharya Kalyansagarsuri, a monk and reformer of Achalgacch, sravakas Sheth Vardhaman and Sheth Padamshin reconstructed the shrine of Mahakali in 16th century CE.
4. In a laudatory poem dedicated to Jirawala Parshvanatha and composed by Jain monk Dipvijay Kaviraaj in late 18th century CE, the temples existing here are described in detail, including the Mahakali shrine.

Several monks of the Achalgacch such as Acharya Mahendraprabhasuri, Acharya Merutungasuri, and Acharya Jaykesarisuri amongst many, and those of the Tapagacch such as Acharya Dharmaratnasuri, Hemvimalsuri, Acharya Laxmisagarsuri, Acharya Bhuvansundarsuri, etc. consecrated numerous idols on the hill. According to several Śvetāmbara scriptures, at one time, these shrines were considered to be of equal rank and importance as those atop the hill at Palitana.

== Architecture and fittings ==
The small and plain temple is set amidst fortifications with an open yard in the front and is open for long hours to cater to the rush of pilgrims. There are two altars in front of the temple for offering sacrifices to the Goddess, but any kind of animal sacrifice is strictly banned since almost two to three centuries now. The Kali yantra is worshipped at the temple.

The old complex was divided into two parts, the ground floor containing Hindu shrines, while the temple spire is domed with a Muslim shrine. The chief shrine on the ground floor contains three divine images: in the centre Kalika Mata in the centre (depicted in the form of a head, known as mukhwato and red in colour), while Bhadrakali is situated to her right and Bahuchara Mata to her left. The domed temple spire contains a Muslim shrine and mausoleum to Sadan Shah Pir, a Sufi saint.

Following redevelopment of the temple in 2022, the dargah was shifted nearby and the new shikhara of the temple was built.

== Festivals ==
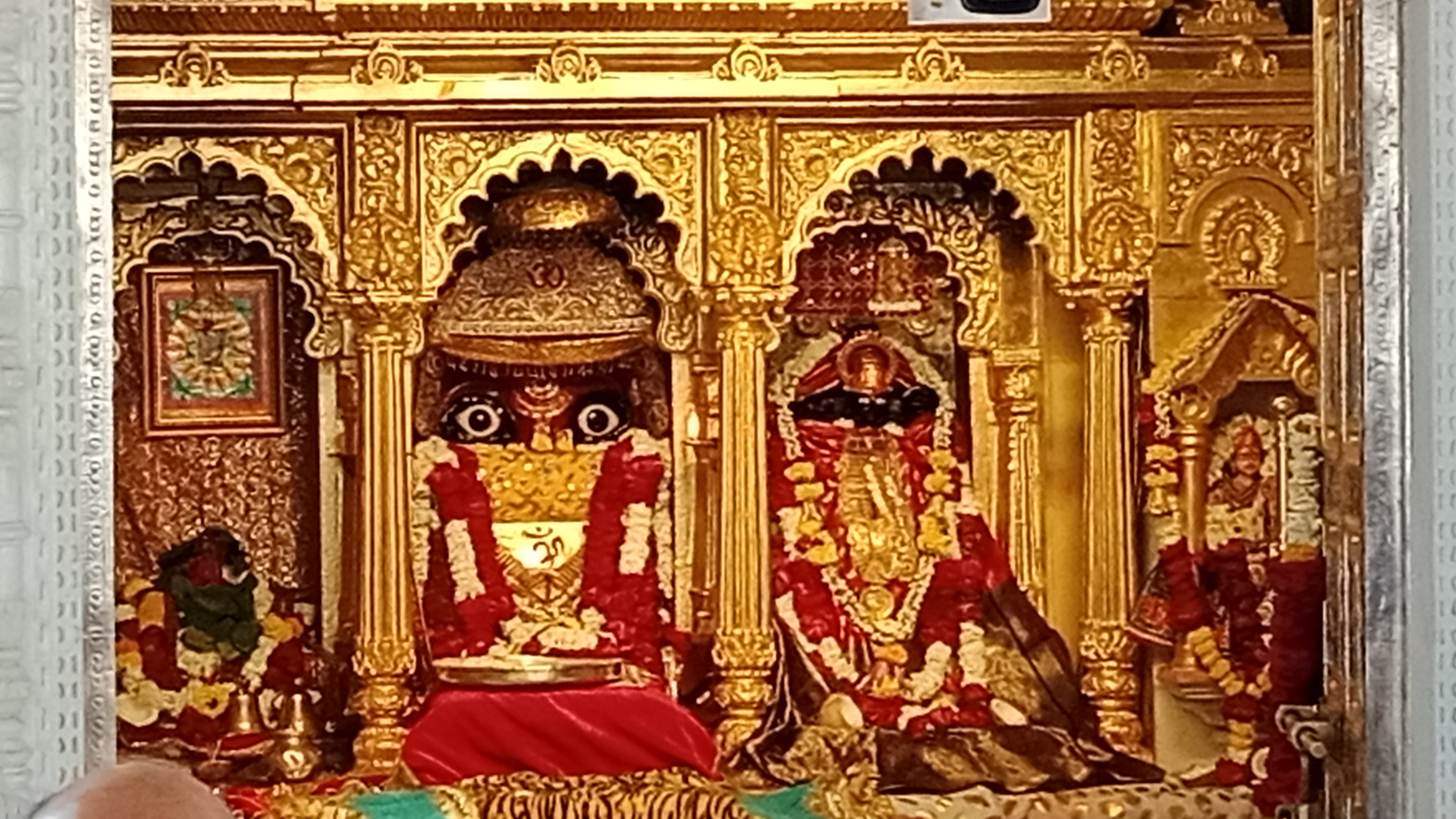
Goddess Mahakali in middle, Kali on left side and Bahuchara in right, in the main altar of the temple

The temple is one of the biggest tourist and pilgrimage centers in Gujarat, attracting large numbers of people every year. It is a Chodhri tradition to make a pilgrimage here at least once in a lifetime. Devotees of Kalika Mata visiting the temple "worshipped by beating bell-metal symbols". Every year in September and October during Navratri (9-day devotion of all shakti goddess) large number of devotees come together for celebration.

== Issues and Controversy ==
On June 16, 2024, an incident of severe vandalism was reported to have happened on the hill. Several Tirthankara idols at the sides of the staircase on the old path to reach the Kalika Mata shrine were desecrated and broken down. Jain monk Jinpremvijaya spearheaded a peaceful but powerful protest at the local collector's office where local Jains turned up in huge numbers. The protest is said to have begun at the evening of June 16, 2024 and went on overnight into June 17, 2024. Most desecrated idols were over 400 years old, some even ancient and belonged exclusively to the Śvetāmbara sect.

== See also ==
- Jain temples, Pavagadh
- Palitana temples
- Monuments of Champaner-Pavagadh Archaeological Park
