= Jirawala Tirth =

Śvetāmbara Jain Temple in Rajasthan, India

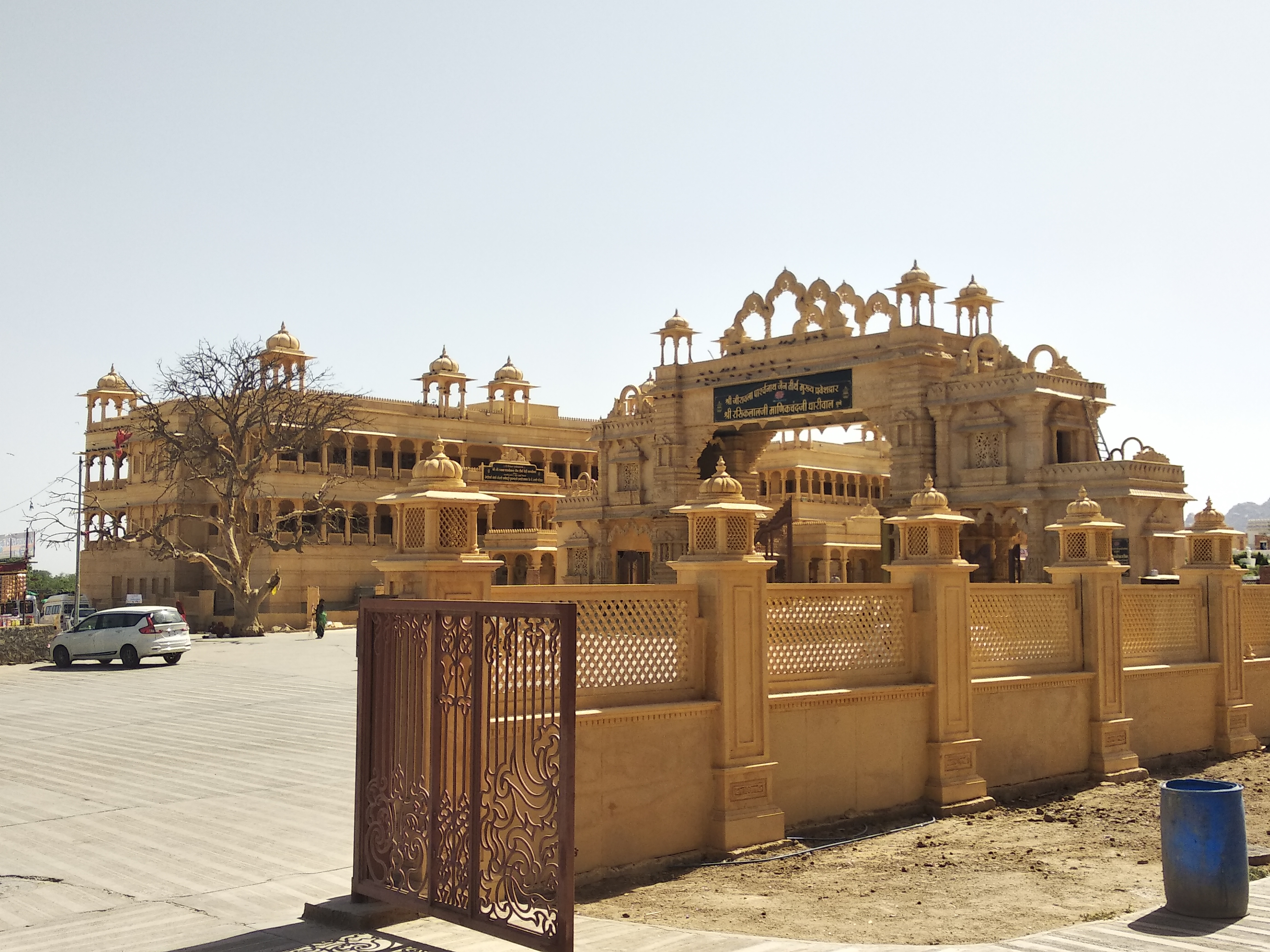
- Jirawala Parshwanath temple

- Location within Rajasthan

Religion
- Affiliation: Jainism
- Sect: Śvetāmbara
- Deity: Parshva
- Festivals: Mahavir Jayanti, Diwali

Location
- Location: Sirohi district, Rajasthan, India
- Coordinates: 24°40′26.3″N 72°29′34.8″E

Architecture
- Creator: Sheth Shri Amrasa
- Completed: 1134 CE (present structure)
- Temple: 2

Website
- www.jirawalatirth.com

Jirawala Tirth is a Śvetāmbara Jain temple in Jirawala village of Sirohi District in Rajasthan, India. It is situated 58 km from Abu Road. The temple is an important Śvetāmbara Jain pilgrimage center, and the Jirawala Parshvanath idol is one of the 108 prominent Śvetāmbara Parshvanath idols.

== History ==
According to Jain belief, the temple dates back to 2,800 years back. Jirawala has been an important Jain centre between 506 CE to 1324 CE and received patronage by multiple Jain acharyas. The iconic idol of Parshvanath, the principal deity of the temple, was found during an excavation. The cow belonging to Brahmin boy Kadwa used to pour out its milk every day near a cave in Jirawala. Upon hearing about this by Brahmin boy, Jain Seth Dhanna Shah dreamt of a Parshvanath idol where cow went to pour milk. After the search, the idol was found from the same spot and the idol was installed by Acharya Deva Gupta Suri in 894 CE. An idol of Neminatha was temporarily replaced as mulnayak of the temple.

During 2001 Gujarat earthquake, the temple structure was damaged and was later restored in 2017 with a cost of ₹60 crore (US$6.2 million).

== Architecture ==
The temple has an ornate architecture. The temple has a large domical structure as the principal shrine with domical 52 sub-shrine along the axis of principal shrine. There a total of 108 idols of Parshvanatha in these shrines each bearing a different name with central shrine housing idol of Jirawala Parshvanatha, the principal deity of the temple. There are total of 60 dhwaja stambha in the temple complex.

== About temple ==
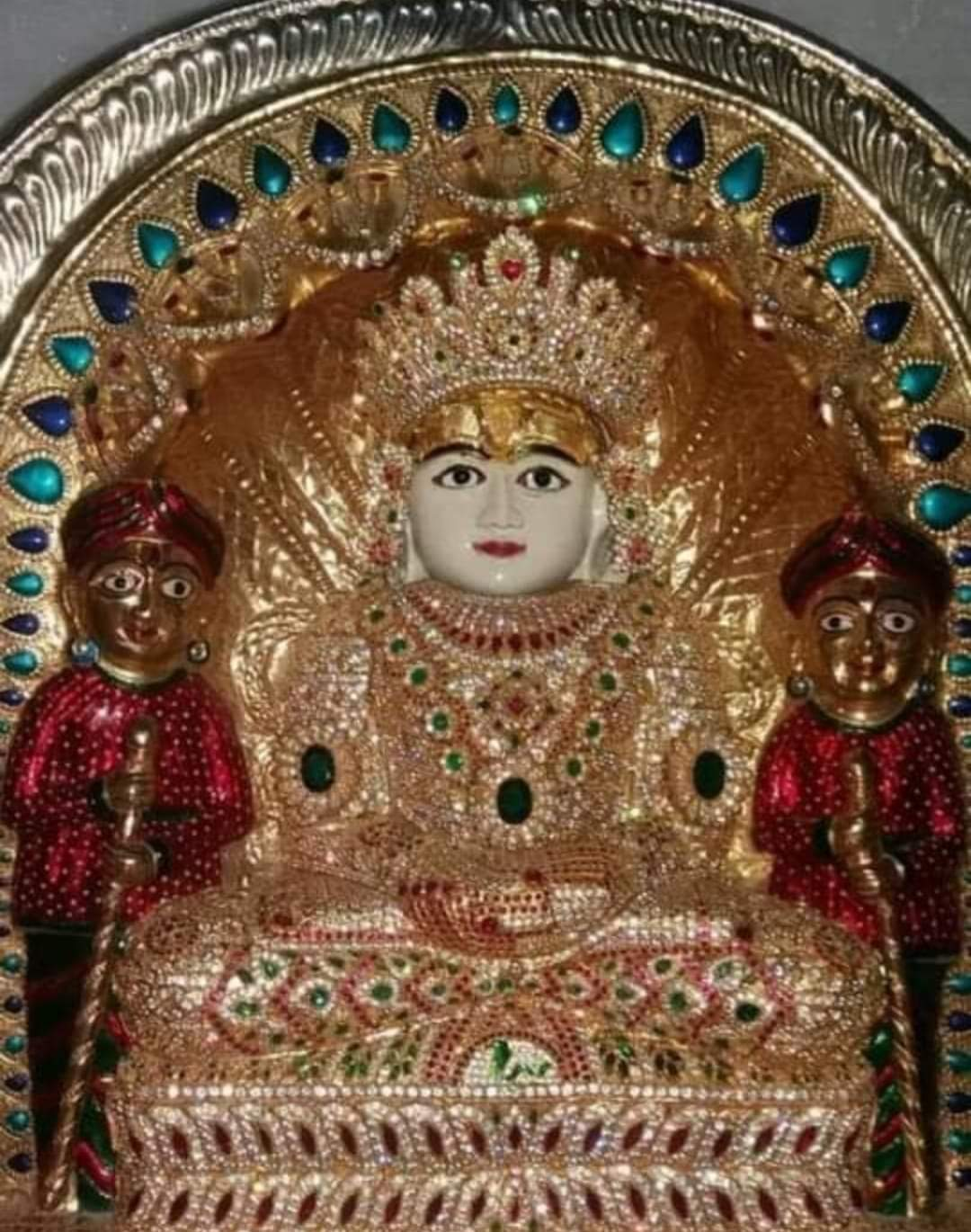
Jirawala Parshvanatha idol

The current structure of the temple dates back to 1134 AD. The temple is considered an important Jain pilgrimage center. The principal deity of the temple is a 18 centimetres (7.1 in) white coloured idol of Parshvanatha popularly known as Jirawala Parshvanath. The idol is believed to made using mixture milk and sand. In Shvetambara tradition, idols tend to derive their name from a geographical region, the Jirawala Parshvanath is one of 108 prominent idols of Parshvanath idols. The replicas of Jirawala Parshvanatha is popular among Śvētāmbara murtipujaka. According to Jain belief, worshipping these local replication idols allow them to directly worship to the original idol. There is a temple with an image of Neminatha, too. These temples were attacked and desecrated during Muslim rule but were later renovated by the Jain community. The village was a place of pilgrimage for Jains. Many Jain saints and scholars visited the place and composed the religious books there during the fifteenth century.

The temple also has a dharamshala equipped with all modern facilities, including bhojanalaya (a restaurant).

== See also ==
- Dilwara temples
