= Kevada Mosque =

Former mosque in Champaner, Gujarat, India

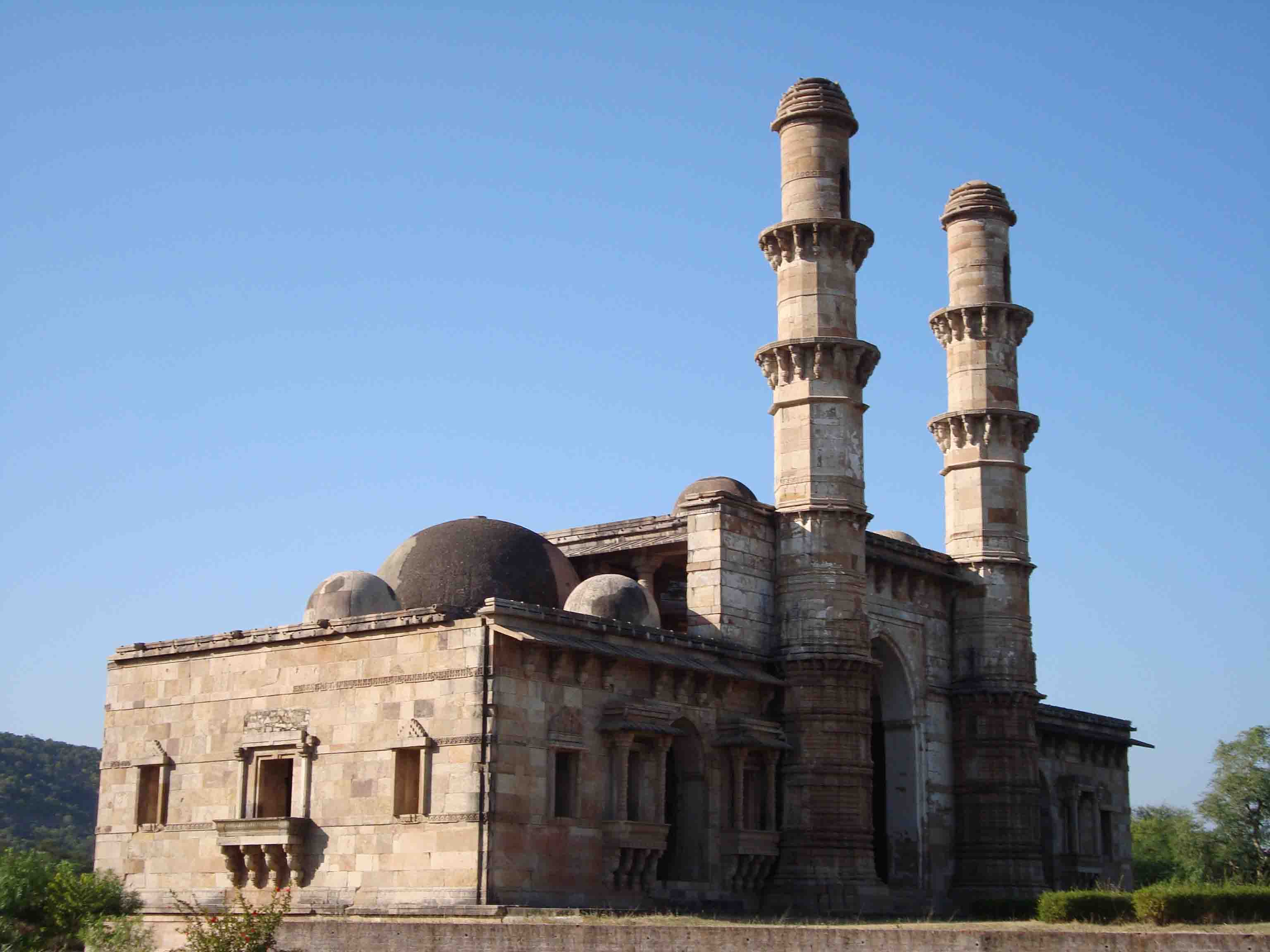

- Location of the mosque in Gujarat

Religion
- Affiliation: Islam (former)
- Ecclesiastical or organizational status: Mosque (former)
- Status: Abandoned; Preserved

Location
- Location: Champaner, Panchmahal, Gujarat
- Country: India
- Interactive map of Kevada Mosque
- Coordinates: 22°29′09″N 73°32′14″E

Architecture
- Type: Mosque architecture
- Style: Indo-Islamic; Mughal
- Funded by: Mahmud Begada
- Completed: 15th century

Specifications
- Dome: Five
- Minaret: Two
- Materials: Rubble masonry

Monument of National Importance
- Official name: Kevada Mosque and Canatoph of Kevda Masjid
- Reference no.: N-GJ-93 and 95

UNESCO World Heritage Site
- Official name: Champaner-Pavagadh Archaeological Park
- Criteria: Cultural: (iii), (iv), (v), (vi)
- Designated: 2004
- Reference no.: 1101

The Kevada Mosque (also known as Kewda or Kevda) is a former mosque, now a heritage site, in Champaner, in the state of Gujarat, India. The mosque and its cenotaph are Monuments of National Importance, and, together with other structures, are part of the Champaner-Pavagadh Archaeological Park, a UNESCO World Heritage Site.They are among the 114 monuments listed by the Baroda Heritage Trust. The mosque has minarets, globe-like domes, and narrow stairs. According to Ruggles (2008), the "built temple reified natural form" and nature was integrated into the Kevada Mosque's architecture in a way that was unusual elsewhere in the Islamic world.

== History ==
The mosque was built in Champaner during the time of Mahmud Begada, as were several other mosques within the Champaner-Pavagadh Archaeological Park, including the Bawaman, Jama, Lila Gumbaj Ki, and Nagina mosques, and the Ek Minar, Khajuri, and Shahar Ki mosques. After James Burgess and Henry Cousens wrote descriptions of the Kevada, Jama, and Nagina Mosques, roads were built to reach them. The Kevada is notable because of its mausoleum. The Kathra Mosque is west of the Kevada.

== Architecture ==
The mosque has many intricately carved mihrabs. There is a damaged brick tank for ablutions before prayers are offered at the mosque. The cenotaph, located next to the tank, is square in shape with a fluted central dome and four corner domes. The layout of the mosque is rectangular. Floral and geometrical designs adorn the niches. The trabeate inter-columns are considered attractive. The prayer hall, a double-storied structure, had three domes, but the central dome has since disappeared. The windows have balconies built over pillars with intricate carved decorations. There are two minarets, which are also decorated with intricate carvings. Restoration works were carried out in the 1890s.

The Archaeological Survey of India (ASI) reports of 2006 indicate that extensive restoration works were carried out at the Kevada Mosque and also at many other monuments in Champaner-Pavagadh Archaeological Park, the Jami Mosque, fort walls, Bawana Mosque, Lila Gubaz, Sikandar Shah Tomb and Sikander tomb, which resulted in a slight increase in tourist traffic to the sites. ASI had already spent Rs 2.25 crores (about US$0.45 million) on conservation in a four-year period and a further Rs 1.15 crores (US$0.23 million) was allotted for more restoration work at the sites.

== Gallery ==
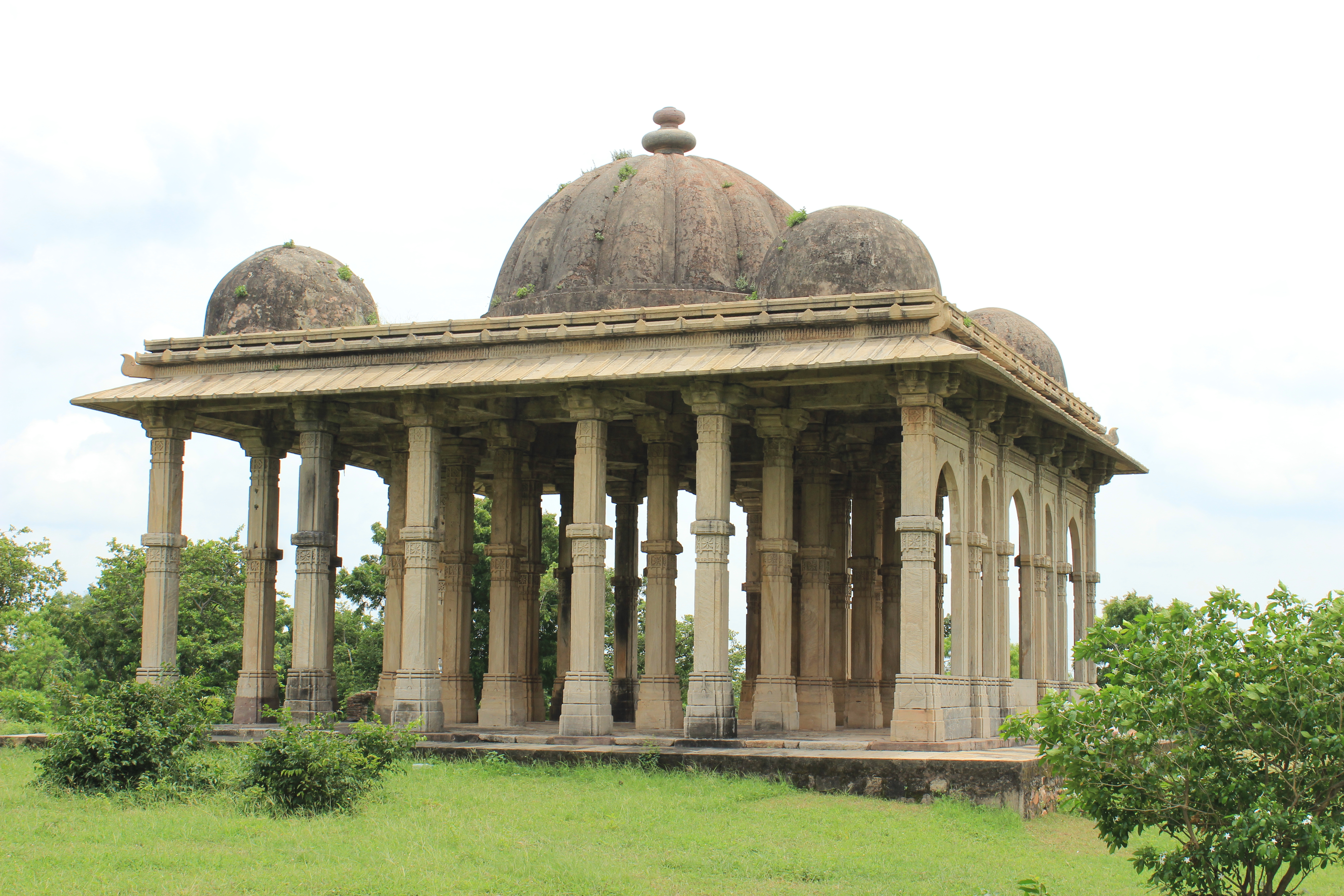
Cenotaph in front of the mosque

== See also ==
- Islam in India
- List of mosques in India
- List of Monuments of National Importance in Gujarat
- Monuments of Champaner-Pavagadh Archaeological Park
- Jain temples, Pavagadh
- Palitana temples
