= Nagina Mosque =

Former mosque in Champaner, Gujarat, India

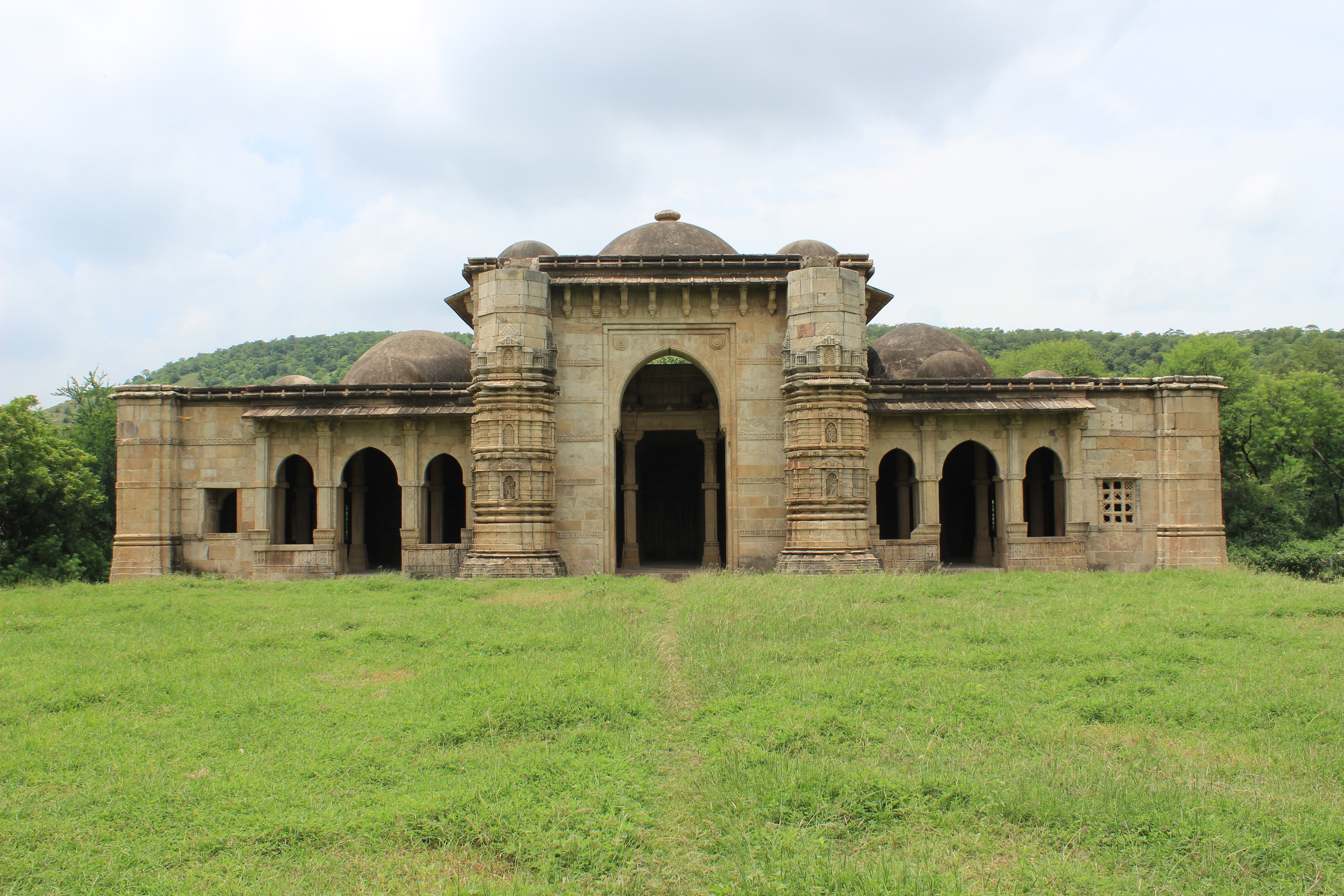

- Location of the mosque in Gujarat

Religion
- Affiliation: Islam (former)
- Ecclesiastical or organizational status: Mosque (former)
- Status: Abandoned; Preserved

Location
- Location: Champaner, Panchmahal, Gujarat
- Country: India
- Interactive map of Nagina Mosque
- Coordinates: 22°29′09″N 73°32′14″E

Architecture
- Type: Mosque architecture
- Style: Indo-Islamic; Mughal
- Funded by: Mahmud Begada
- Completed: 15th century

Specifications
- Dome: Three
- Minaret: Two
- Materials: Rubble masonry

Monument of National Importance
- Official name: Nagina Mosque and Cenatop of Nagina Masjid
- Reference no.: N-GJ-96 and 97

UNESCO World Heritage Site
- Official name: Champaner-Pavagadh Archaeological Park
- Criteria: Cultural: (iii), (iv), (v), (vi)
- Designated: 2004
- Reference no.: 1101

The Nagina Mosque (meaning 'Jewel Mosque', see Negin) is a former mosque, now a heritage site, in Champaner, Gujarat, India. It was built during the time of Mahmud Begada, in the 15th century. It has minarets, globe-like domes, and narrow stairs. The mosque is a Monument of National Importance, and, together with other structures, is part of the Champaner-Pavagadh Archaeological Park, a UNESCO World Heritage Site, and is among the 114 monuments there which are listed by the Baroda Heritage Trust.

== History ==
The mosque was built in Champaner during the time of Mahmud Begada, as were several other mosques within the Champaner-Pavagadh Archaeological Park, including the Bawaman, Jama, Kevada, and Lila Gumbaj Ki mosques, and the Ek Minar, Khajuri, and Shahar Ki mosques.

== Geography ==
The mosque, or masjid, is approximately 0.75 miles (1.21 km) to the south of the citadel, and 1,800 feet (550 m) north of the Bhadr. The Kajuri Masjid is west of the Nagina and the Kevada is to the north-northwest. A small lake is situated considerably to the north. After James Burgess and Henry Cousens wrote descriptions of the Nagina, Kevada, and Jama Masjids, roads were built to reach them.

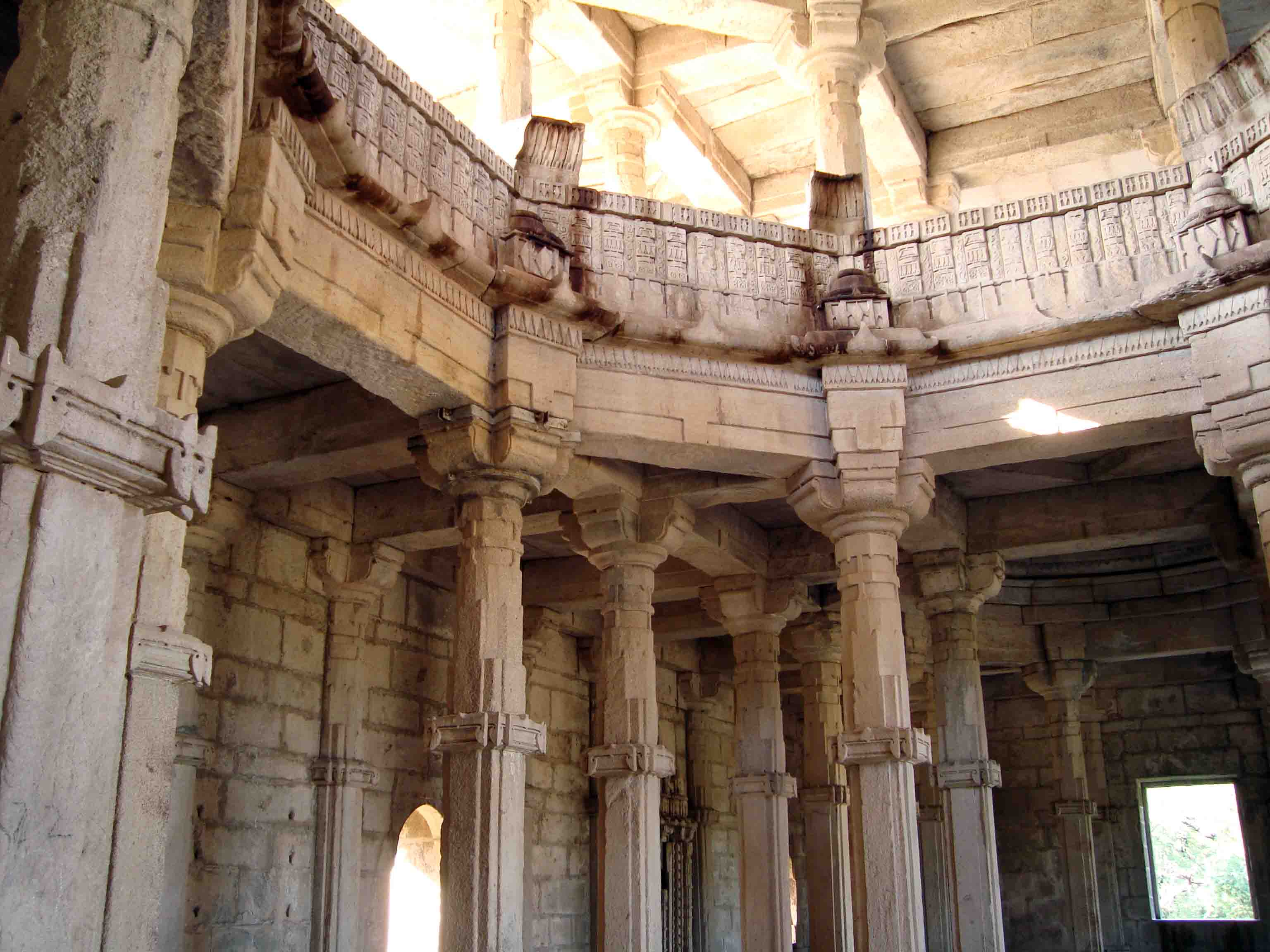
Interior of Nagina Masjid, Champaner.

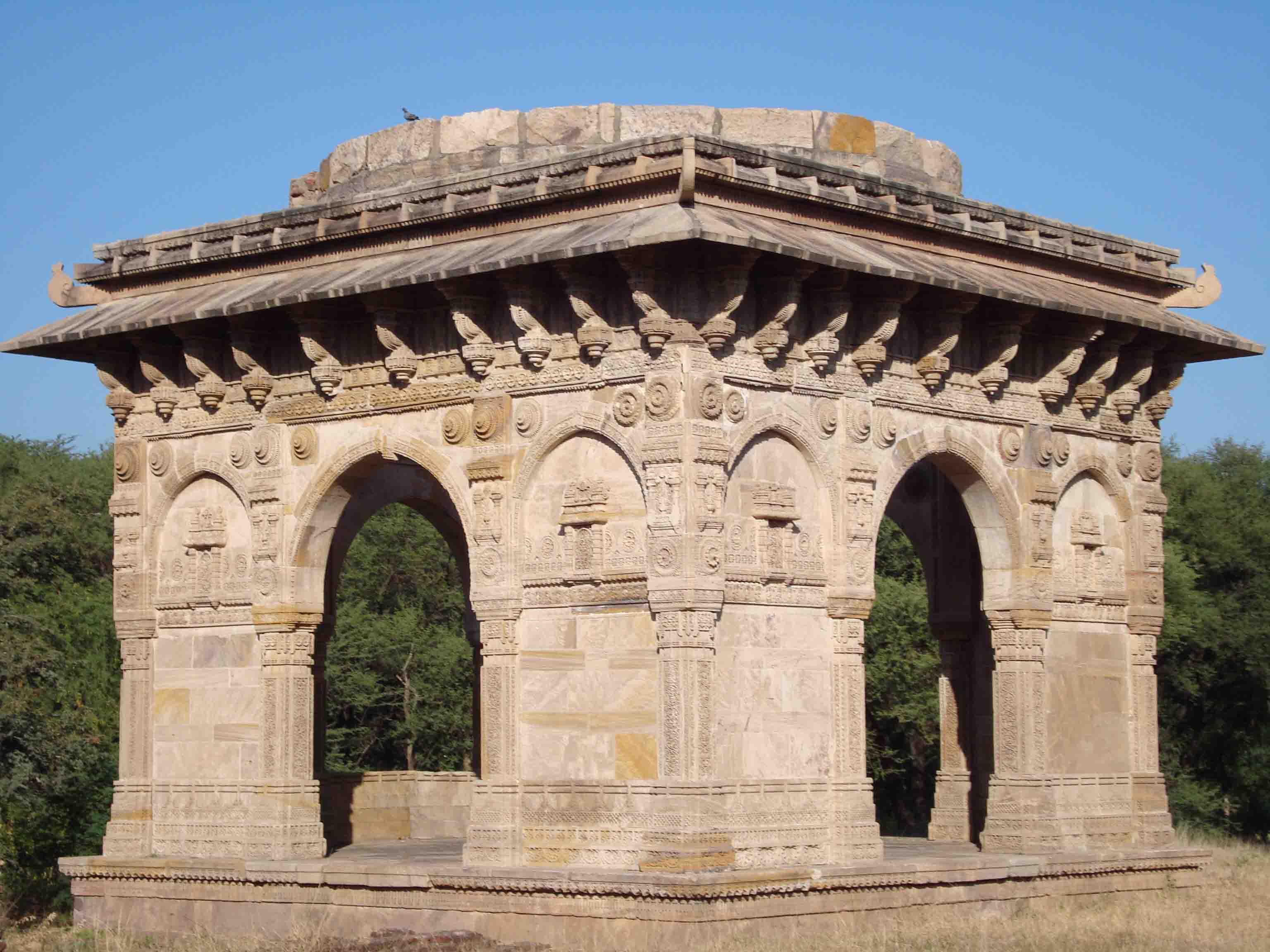
Nagina Masjid's cenotaph.

== Architecture ==
The masjid is a large monument built on a high-rise plinth with a large open courtyard in front. The building was constructed of pure white stone. At the main entrance, the masjid is marked by minarets, which have intricate and elegant carvings; as in other masjids, like Kevada Masjid, it has floral designs in its niches. Three large domes rise over the main prayer hall, above decorative columns and windows. The architecture also features a series of beautifully designed projecting corbels and a projecting cornice, and is decorated with geometric motifsm both inside and outside at the platform level. The main prayer hall rises two storeys and has a balcony.

== Grounds ==
Within the precincts of the masjid there are a few brick structures and step wells. An elegant domed mausoleum is situated in front of the mosque to the northeast. The cenotaph has openings on all four directions; its frontage, columns and niches are decorated with carved floral and geometrical designs. The cenotaph's central dome has disappeared.

== Restoration ==
Initial restoration works were carried out in the 1890s. The pillars of Nagina Masjid and Lila Gumbaj Ki Masjid were subject to deterioration due to wind, humidity and moisture (bio-deterioration) and the stones were "pulverized". Further pulverization was prevented by spraying on OH-100 (ethyl silicate) and also in a few cases deteriorated areas were filled with stone powder mixed with OH-100. Other treatment measures included removing insoluble salts using a 2% solution of sodium hexametaphosphate, ferrous salts with a 2% solution of EDTA and removing bat excreta with a 5% solution of liquid ammonia and non-ionic detergent followed by a second stage of treatment by applying a mixture of ammonium carbonate and ammonium bicarbonate, with EDTA as an additive. Micro-vegetation growth were carefully removed by brushing with soft nylon brushes sprayed with an aqueous solution of 3% ammonia and 1% non-ionic detergent, which was later removed by washing with a large quantity of water.

== Other mosques ==
There are several other mosques within the Champaner-Pavagadh Archaeological Park, including the Bawaman, Jama, Kevada, and Lila Gumbaj Ki mosques.

== See also ==
- Islam in India
- List of mosques in India
- List of Monuments of National Importance in Gujarat
- Monuments of Champaner-Pavagadh Archaeological Park
