= Bawaman Mosque =

Former mosque in Champaner, Gujarat, India

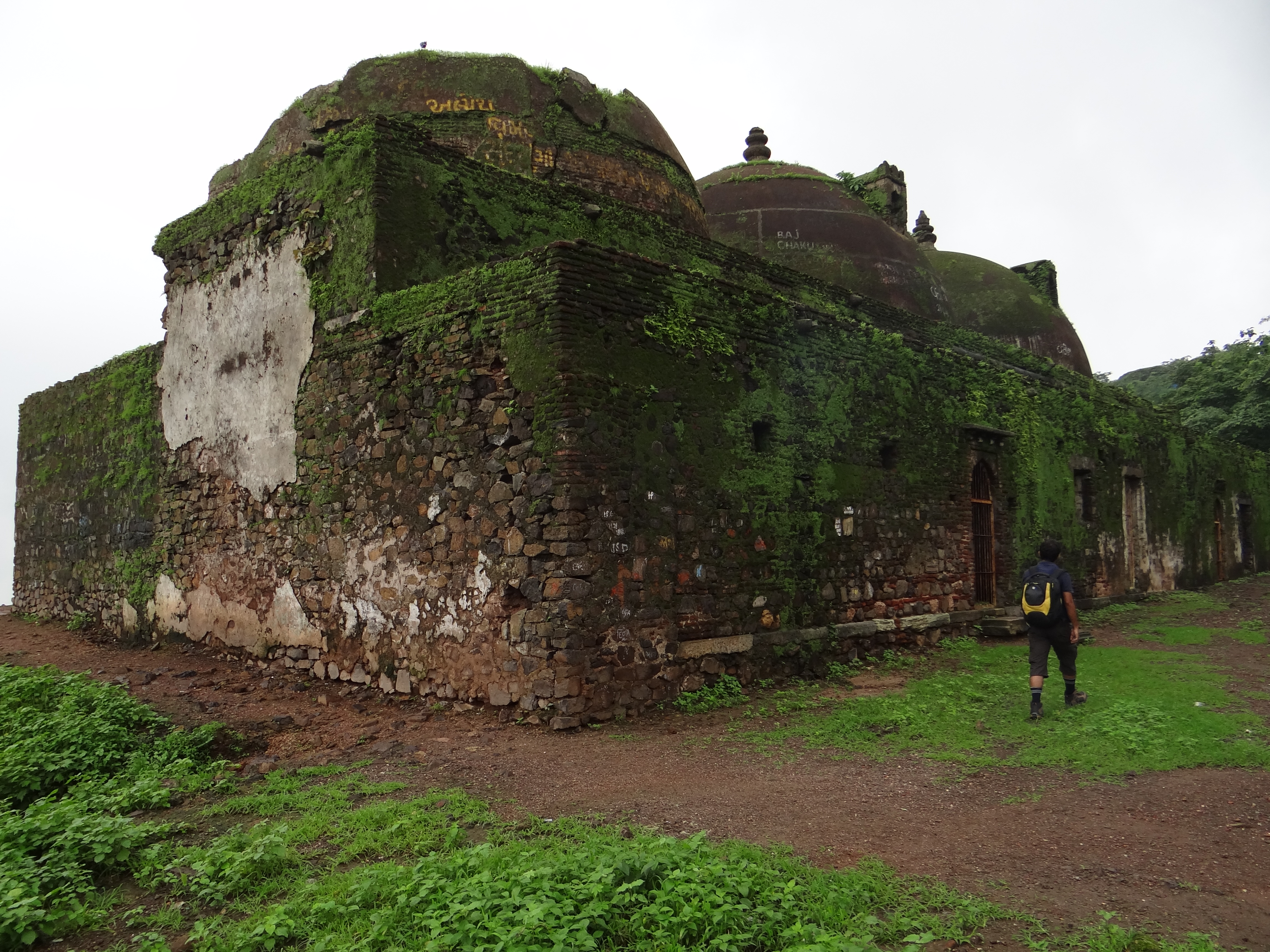

- Location of the mosque in Gujarat

Religion
- Affiliation: Islam (former)
- Ecclesiastical or organizational status: Mosque (former)
- Status: Abandoned; Preserved

Location
- Location: Champaner, Panchmahal, Gujarat
- Country: India
- Interactive map of Bawaman Mosque
- Coordinates: 22°29′09″N 73°32′14″E

Architecture
- Type: Mosque architecture
- Style: Indo-Islamic; Mughal
- Funded by: Mahmud Begada
- Completed: 15th century

Specifications
- Dome: Three
- Minaret: One
- Materials: Rubble masonry

Monument of National Importance
- Official name: Bawa Man's Mosque
- Reference no.: N-GJ-101

UNESCO World Heritage Site
- Official name: Champaner-Pavagadh Archaeological Park
- Criteria: Cultural: (iii), (iv), (v), (vi)
- Designated: 2004
- Reference no.: 1101

The Bawaman Mosque, also known as the Bava Man's Masjid, is a former mosque, now a heritage site, in Champaner, western India. The mosque is a Monument of National Importance, and, together with other structures, is part of the Champaner-Pavagadh Archaeological Park, a UNESCO World Heritage Site, and is among the 114 monuments there which are listed by the Baroda Heritage Trust. It is situated on the western side of one of the ancient city's fort gates.

== History ==
The mosque is named after Bawaman (or Bava Man), who was revered as a saint in Baroda. Bawaman was a follower of Sadan Shah, whose tomb is enshrined within the Kalika Mata Temple at the summit of Pavagadh Hill, which is also within the Archaeological Park. The mosque was built in Champaner during the time of Mahmud Begada, as were several other mosques within the Champaner-Pavagadh Archaeological Park, including the Jama, Kevada, Lila Gumbaj Ki, and Nagina mosques, and the Ek Minar, Khajuri, and Shahar Ki mosques.

While many structural elements are worn or damaged, in 1985 the Archaeological Survey of India reported that restoration work was in progress, such as the removal of dead lime concrete material from the roof, as well as the reset of loose stones in the arches. ASI reported in 2006 that extensive restoration works of many heritage monuments were carried out at the Bawana Mosque and also at the Jama Masjid, fort walls, Kevada Masjid, Lila Gumbaj Ki Masjid, Sikandar Shah Tomb and Sikander tomb, which resulted in a slight increase in tourist traffic to the sites. ASI had spent Rs 2.25 crores on the conservation activity in a four-year period and a further Rs 1.15 crores was allotted for more restoration works at the sites. A follow-up report in 2009 described extensive conservation work subsequent to earthquake damage.

== Architecture ==
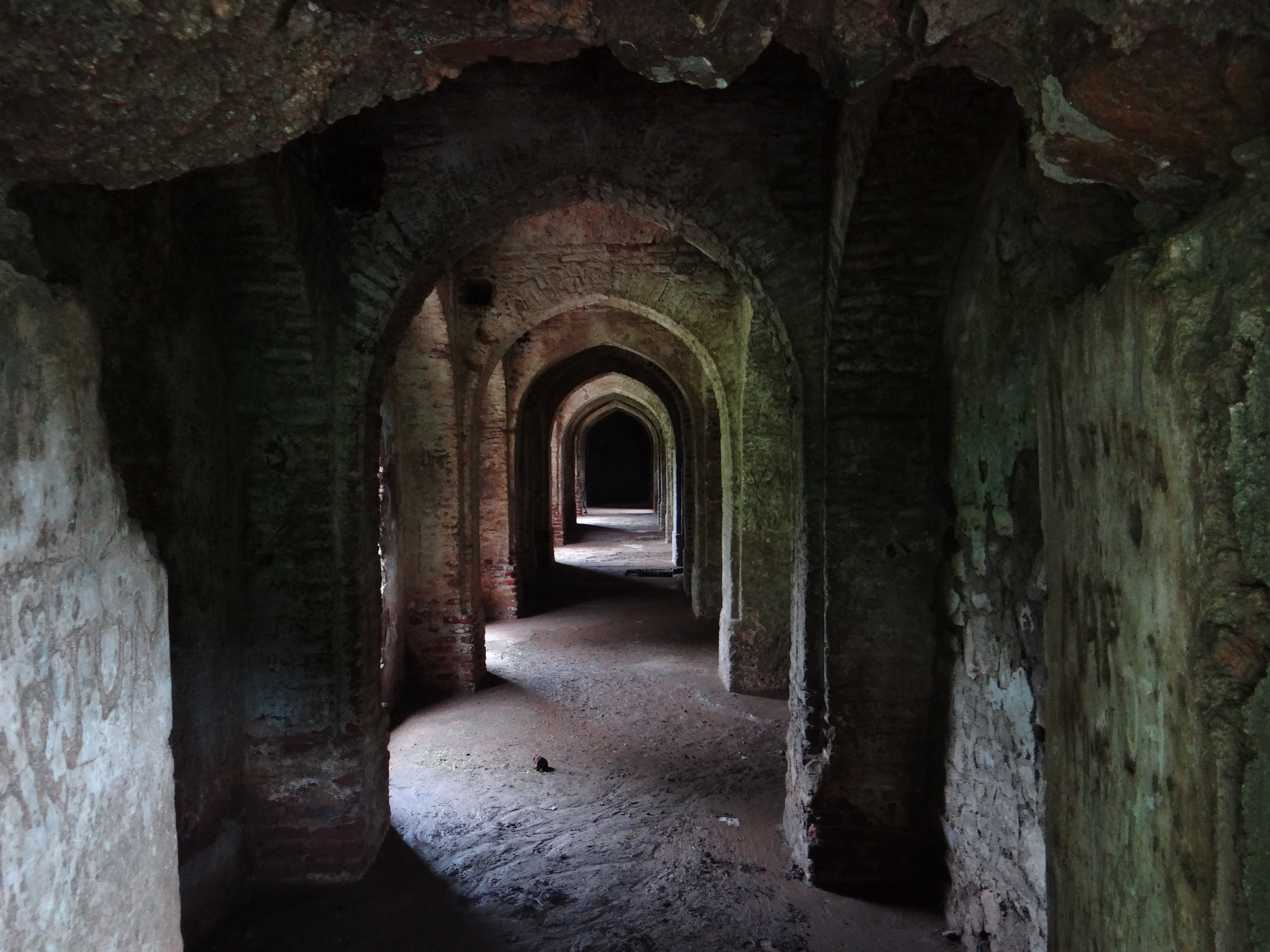
Interiors of the Mosque

Built on a raised platform with a high plinth, its features include a minaret which stands out above the trees, three large domes, three mihrabs on the rear wall, and three arched entrances. There are also ablution tanks close to the building.

== See also ==
- Islam in India
- List of mosques in India
- List of Monuments of National Importance in Gujarat
- Monuments of Champaner-Pavagadh Archaeological Park
- Jain temples, Pavagadh
- Palitana temples
