= Lila Gumbaj Ki Mosque =

Former mosque in Champaner, Gujarat, India

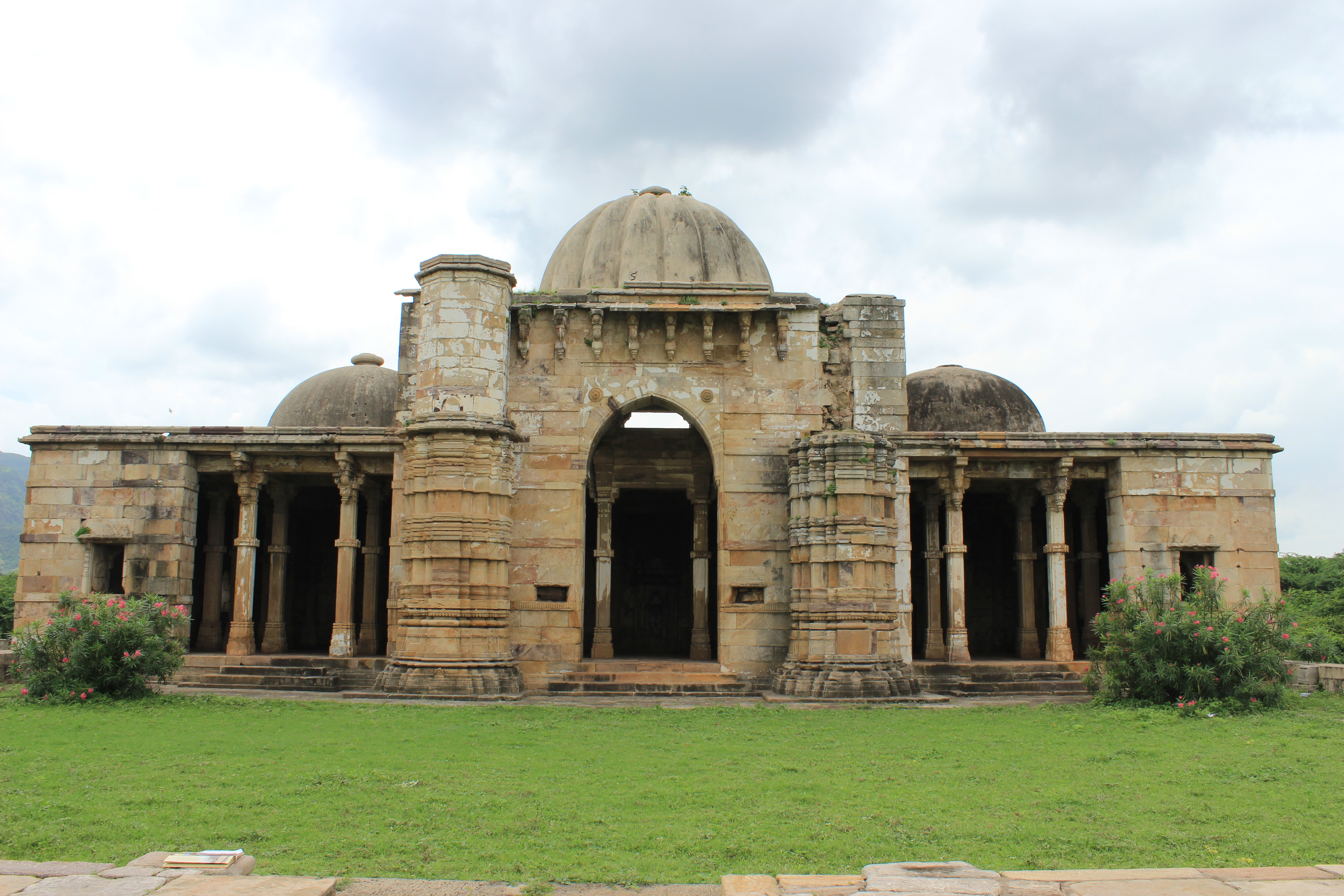

- Location of the mosque in Gujarat

Religion
- Affiliation: Islam (former)
- Ecclesiastical or organizational status: Mosque (former)
- Status: Abandoned; Preserved

Location
- Location: Champaner, Panchmahal, Gujarat
- Country: India
- Interactive map of Lila Gumbaj Ki Mosque
- Coordinates: 22°29′09″N 73°32′14″E

Architecture
- Type: Mosque architecture
- Style: Indo-Islamic; Mughal
- Funded by: Mahmud Begada
- Completed: 15th century

Specifications
- Dome: Three
- Minaret: One
- Materials: Rubble masonry

Monument of National Importance
- Official name: Lila Gumbaj ki Masjid
- Reference no.: N-GJ-98

UNESCO World Heritage Site
- Official name: Champaner-Pavagadh Archaeological Park
- Criteria: Cultural: (iii), (iv), (v), (vi)
- Designated: 2004
- Reference no.: 1101

The Lila Gumbaj Ki Mosque is a former mosque, now a heritage site, located in Champaner, in the state of Gujarat, India. The mosque is a Monument of National Importance, and, together with other structures, is part of the Champaner-Pavagadh Archaeological Park, a UNESCO World Heritage Site, and is among the 114 monuments there which are listed by the Baroda Heritage Trust. It is located near the east gate of the former city.

== Architecture ==
The mosque, or masjid, is built on a high plinth, has a frontage with an arched entrance at the centre flanked by two lateral arches. Initially, three entrances existed on the east, south, and north directions. There are well spaced minarets fashioned with horizontal cornices and mouldings, and decorated niches. Of the three domes, the central one has a fluted design and is colourful. On the north-east corner there is a rectangular ablution tank with a deep drain in front. Inside the mosque, there are three mehrabs in the prayer hall and these are decorated with a central suspended kalash carved with floral motifs.

== Conservation ==
Conservation work on the Lila Gumbaz was conducted in 1921, which involved, according to an Archaeological Survey of India report of that year, removing the concrete cover over the ribbed dome and replacing it with new concrete and plastering, and also replacing stone floor slabs in the interior of the masjid. The drain around the masjid was cleared of decaying vegetation over a length of about 50 feet (15 m). Subsequently, in 1929, an underground drain which runs three quarters of the way around the masjid was cleaned, but only partially. ASI reports of 2006 indicate that extensive restoration works of many heritage monuments were carried out at the Lila Gubaz and also at the Jami Masjid, fort walls, Bawana Mosque, Kevada Masjid, Sikandar Shah Tomb and Sikander tomb, which resulted in a slight increase in tourist traffic to the sites. ASI had already spent Rs 2.25 crores (about US$0.45 million) on conservation in a four-year period and Rs 1.15 crores (US$0.23 million) was allotted for further restoration work at the sites.

The pillars of Lila Masjid and Nagina Masjid were subject to deterioration due to wind, humidity and moisture (bio-deterioration) and the stones were "pulverized"; at Lila Masjid, the top parts of the architectural detailing of two pillars had been lost. Further pulverization was prevented by spraying on OH-100 (ethyl silicate) and also in a few cases deteriorated areas were filled with stone powder mixed with OH-100. Other treatment measures included removing insoluble salts using a 2% solution of sodium hexa meta phosphate, ferrous salts with a 2% solution of EDTA and removing bat excreta with a 5% solution of liquid ammonia and non-ionic detergent followed by a second stage of treatment by applying a mixture of ammonium carbonate and ammonium bicarbonate, with EDTA as an additive. Micro-vegetation growth were carefully removed by brushing with soft nylon brushes sprayed with an aqueous solution of 3% ammonia and 1% non-ionic detergent, which was later removed by washing with a large quantity of water.

== Other mosques ==
There are several other mosques within the Champaner-Pavagadh Archaeological Park, including the Bawaman, Jama, Kevada, and Nagina mosques.

== See also ==
- Islam in India
- List of mosques in India
- List of Monuments of National Importance in Gujarat
- Monuments of Champaner-Pavagadh Archaeological Park
