= Sakar Khan mausoleum =

Mausoleum in Halol, Gujarat, India

Coordinates: 22°28′58.08″N 73°31′5.88″E

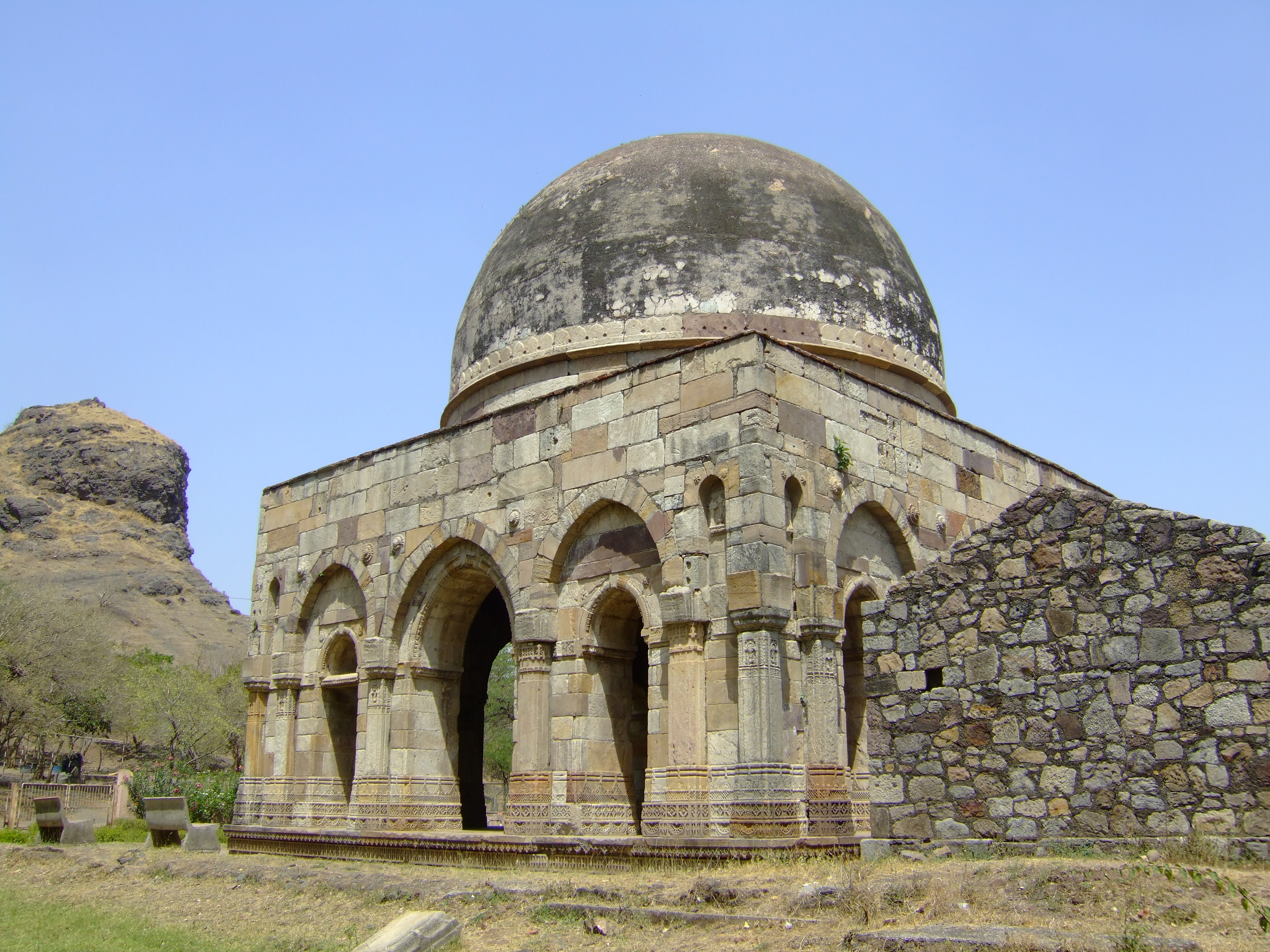
Sakar Khan's Dargah, in Halol, Gujarat

Sakar Khan mausoleum located in Halol, Gujarat, is a dargah or mausoleum of Sakar Khan. It is the largest in the old part of Champaner. Dargah has a low plinth and a large dome, with windows in the frontage.

== See also ==
- List of Monuments of National Importance in Gujarat
- Champaner-Pavagadh Archaeological Park
- Monuments of Champaner-Pavagadh Archaeological Park
