= Jama Mosque, Champaner =

Former mosque and heritage site in Champaner, Gujarat, India

Jami Masjid
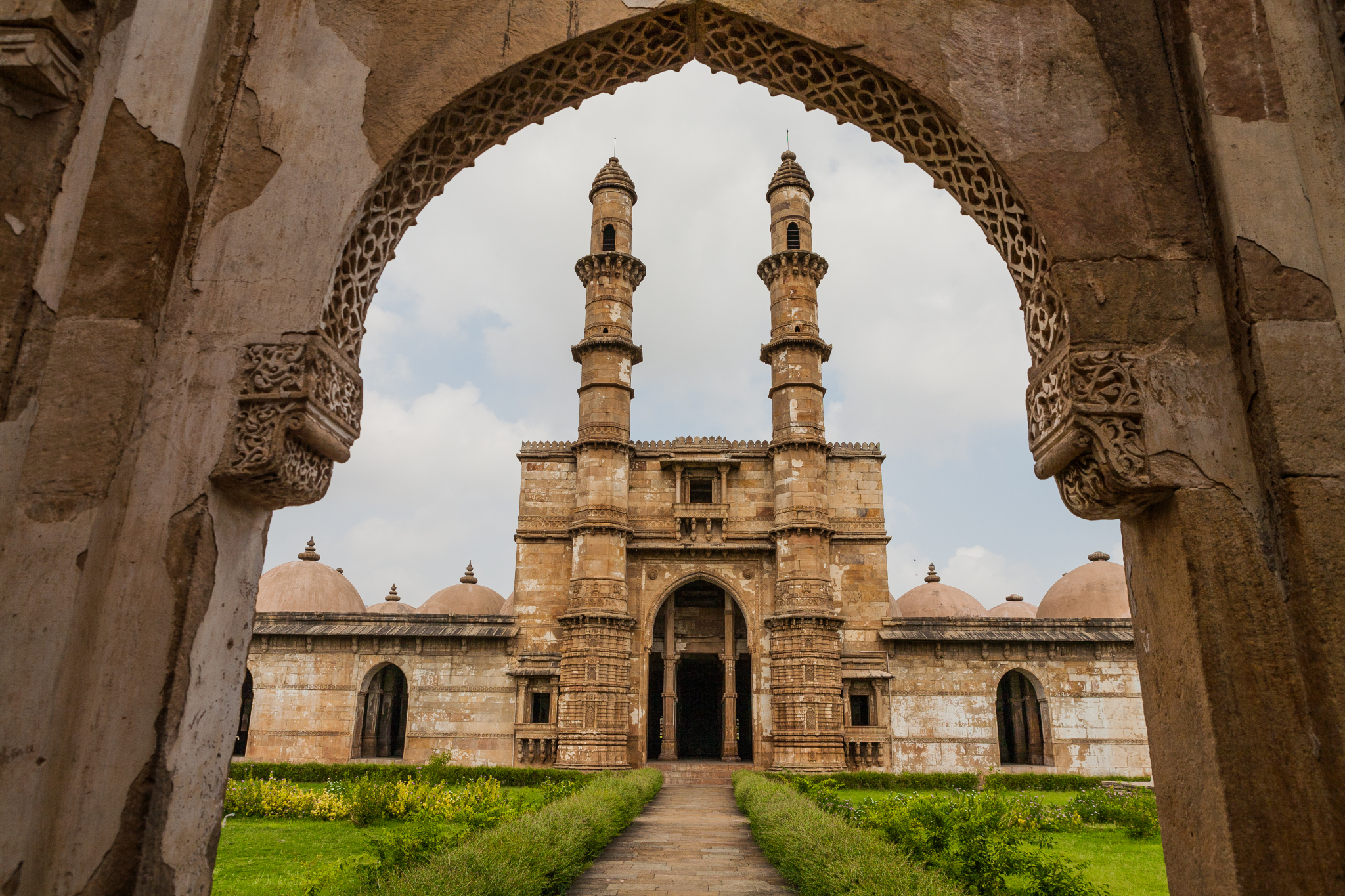

- Location of the former mosque in Gujarat

Religion
- Affiliation: Islam (former)
- Ecclesiastical or organizational status: Mosque (former)
- Status: Abandoned; Preserved (good condition)

Location
- Location: Champaner, Panchmahal, Gujarat
- Country: India
- Interactive map of Jami Masjid
- Coordinates: 22°29′09″N 73°32′14″E

Architecture
- Type: Mosque architecture
- Style: Indo-Islamic; Mughal
- Funded by: Mahmud Begada
- Completed: 1513

Specifications
- Dome: Twelve
- Minaret: Two
- Minaret height: 30 metres (98 ft)
- Materials: Rubble masonry

Monument of National Importance
- Official name: Jami Masjid, Champaner
- Reference no.: N-GJ-91

UNESCO World Heritage Site
- Official name: Champaner-Pavagadh Archaeological Park
- Criteria: Cultural: (iii), (iv), (v), (vi)
- Designated: 2004
- Reference no.: 1101

The Jami Masjid, also known as Jama Masjid; meaning "public mosque", is a former Friday mosque, now a well-preserved heritage site, located in Champaner, in the state of Gujarat, India. The mosque is a Monument of National Importance, and, together with other structures, is part of the Champaner-Pavagadh Archaeological Park, a UNESCO World Heritage Site, and is among the 114 monuments there which are listed by the Baroda Heritage Trust. The mosque is located approximately 46 metres (150 ft) east of the city walls (Jahdnpandh), near the east gate.

== History ==
The mosque dates from 1513; and construction was carried out over 25 years. It is one of the most notable monuments built by Sultan Mahmud Begada. The Mughal architecture is said to have drawn from the architecture of the Sultanates, which is a blend of Jain religious connotations and workmanship with Muslim ethos; the large domes are indicative of such a mix. Restoration works were carried out in the 1890s.

== Architecture ==
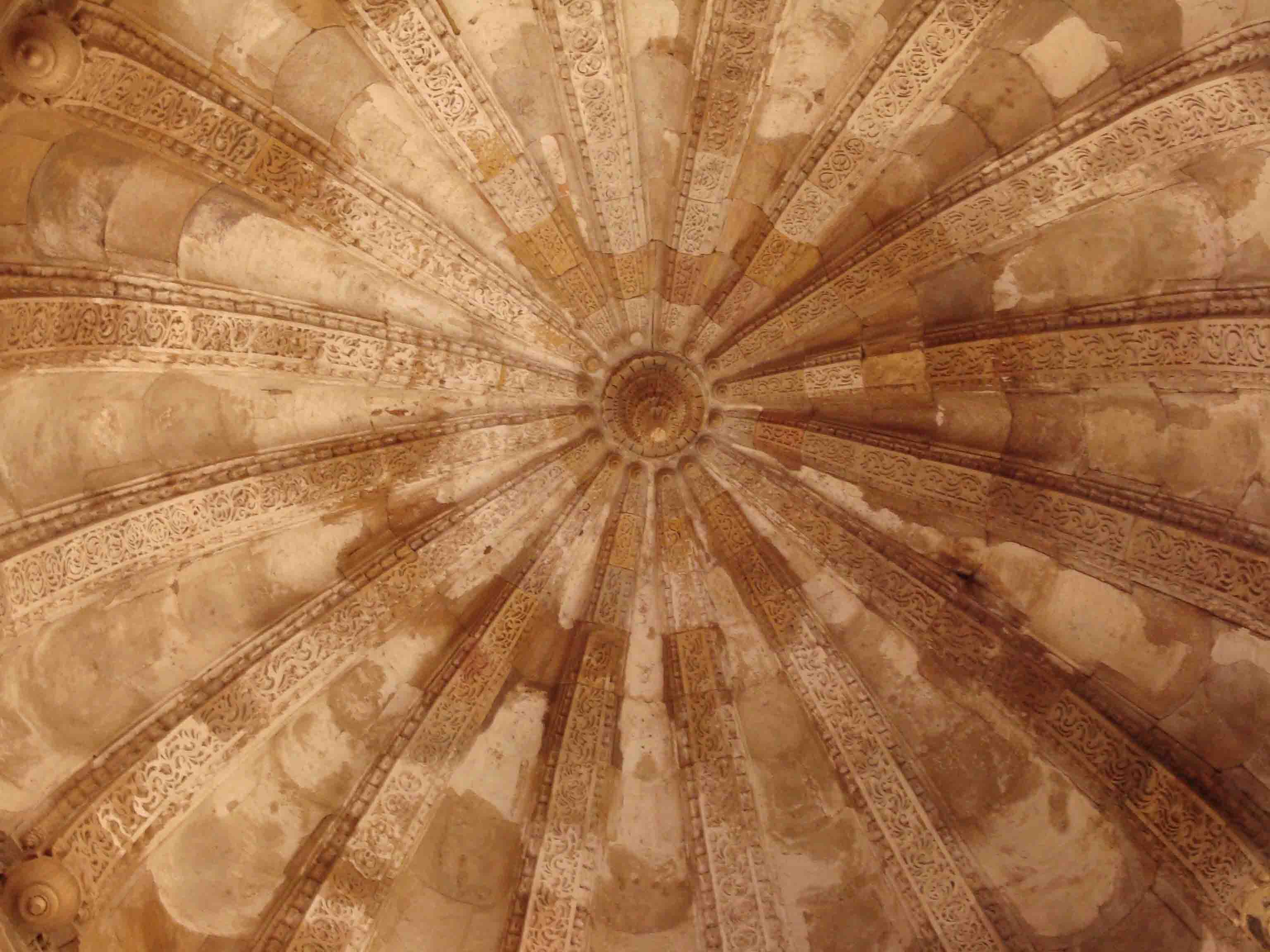
Central dome of the mosque

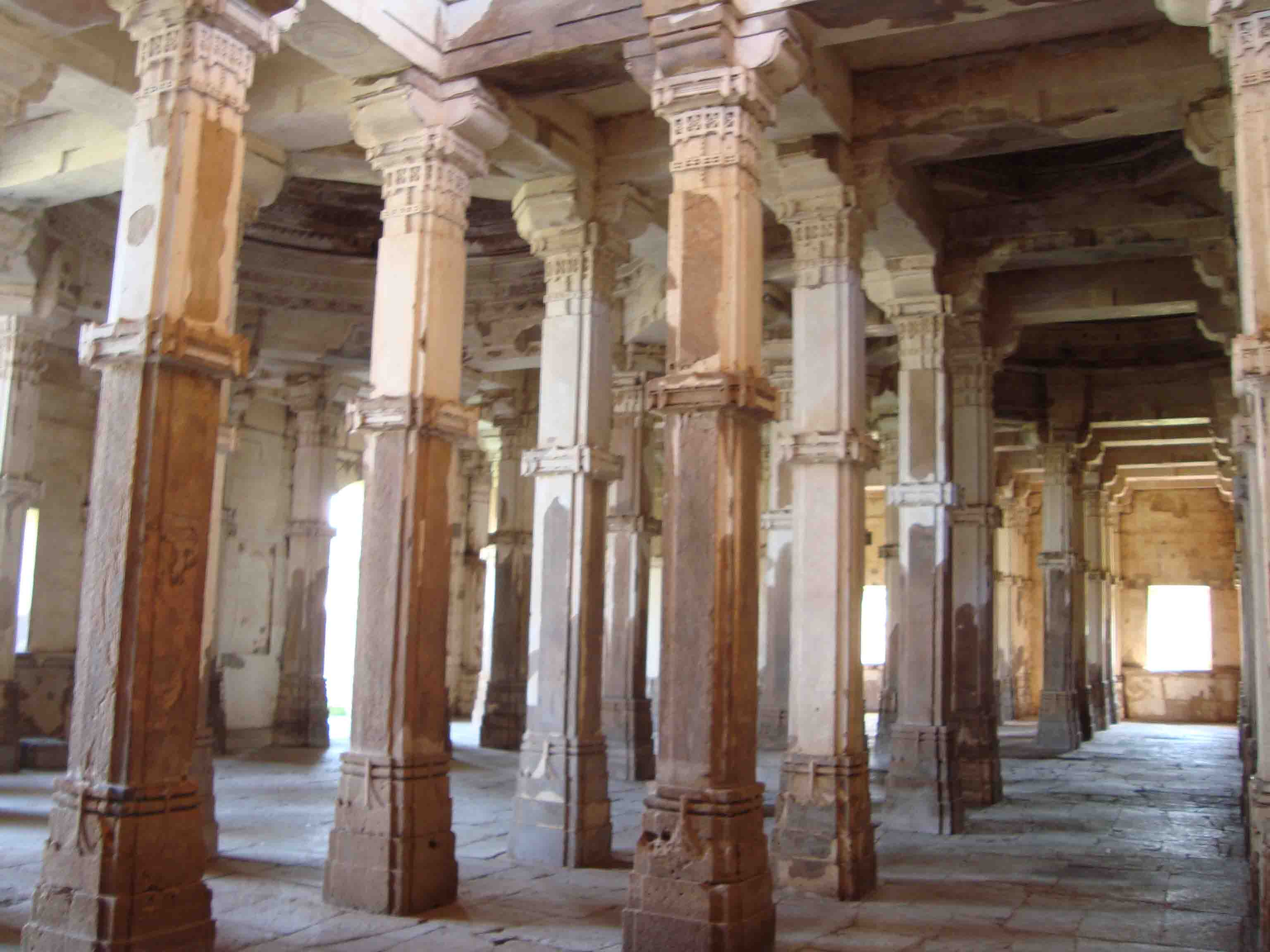
Interior pillars of the mosque

It has a blend of Jain and Muslim architecture, preserving the Islamic ethos, and is considered one of the finest mosques in Western India with its elegant interiors. The ornamentation of the surface areas of the mosque and tomb consists of symbols of motifs of the Sun, diamonds, pots and vines, and lotus insignia which were used in the earlier temples; the artists of the region who worked on these monuments had imbibed their craftsmanship from their forefathers and they were not sectarian in character as they worked on assignments given by Hindus, Muslims or Jains. This mosque had three oblong mural plaques, one at the top of the pulpit and the other two on the sides, with engravings of hymns from the Koran.

The building is two-storied, with both Islamic and Hindu styles of decoration. The plan is similar to that of the Sidi Saiyyed Mosque in Ahmedabad; it is rectangular with the entrance on the east side. There is a portico which has a large dome built over a podium. There are steps to the mosque from northern and southern directions. Tall octagonal minarets 30 metres (98 ft) in height are situated on both sides of the main carved entrance. One of the two minarets were damaged by an intentional gun firing in 1812 by Patankar, a Scindia Governor. A typical Gujarat style of architecture is seen in the form of oriel windows with distinctive carvings on the outer surface. The carved roof contains several domes, and the courtyard is large. There are seven mihrabs and the entrance gates are carved and fitted with fine stone jalis.

Multiple prayer halls are separated by almost 200 pillars. The main prayer hall has eleven domes, with the central dome, a double-storied structure, built on pillars in an arcade form. The ruler's prayer hall is separated from the main area by jalis. There is a double clerestory in one of the domes. Other interior features include an arcuate maqsurah screen, trabeate hypostyle lwan, double square side wings, zanana enclosure, and screened off northern mihrab.

=== Grounds ===
Tombs have been built adjacent to the mosque, invariably to a square plan with columns and domes erected over them, and also embellished with decorations. An ablution tank of octagonal kund appearance is near the building; it was used for rainwater harvesting and washing before prayer. The mosque has become a place of pilgrimage for those who seek blessings from the pir who is buried in one corner of the garden.

== Other mosques ==
There are several other mosques within the Champaner-Pavagadh Archaeological Park, including the Bawaman, Kevada, Lila Gumbaj Ki, and Nagina mosques.

== Gallery ==
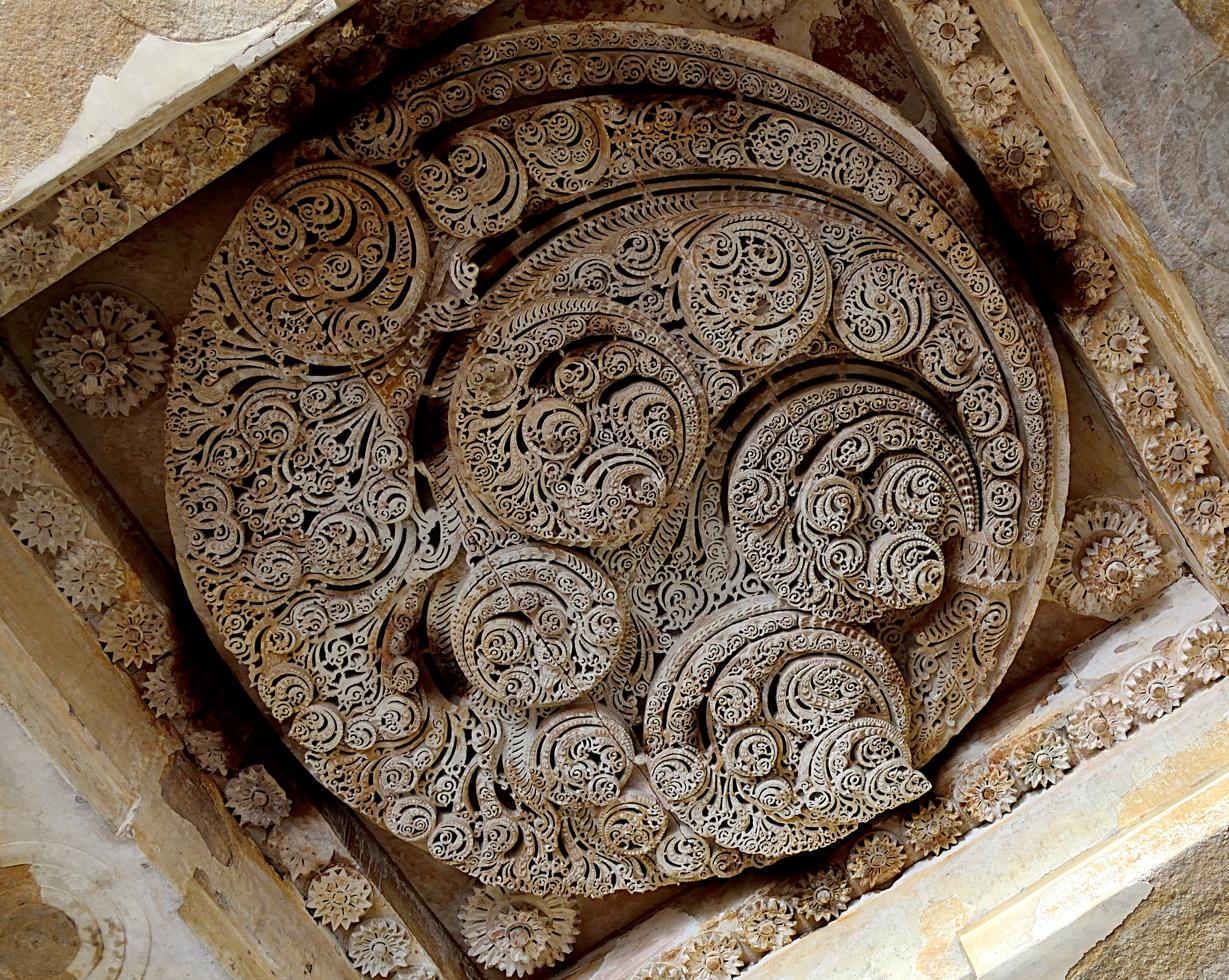
Ceiling fractal carvings resemble to Kalpavriksha illustration in Dilwara Jain Temple

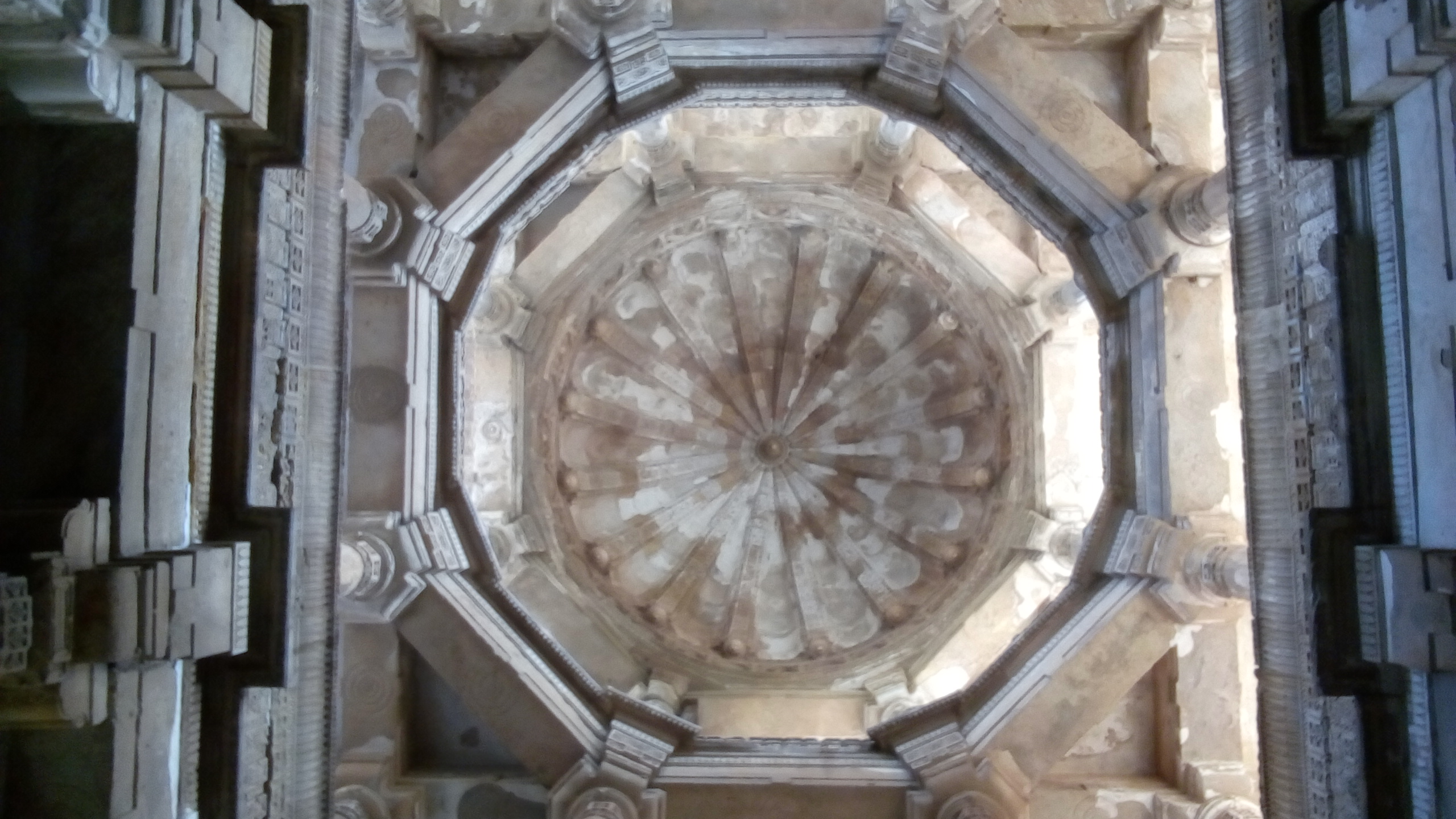
Sky light and supports of main dome

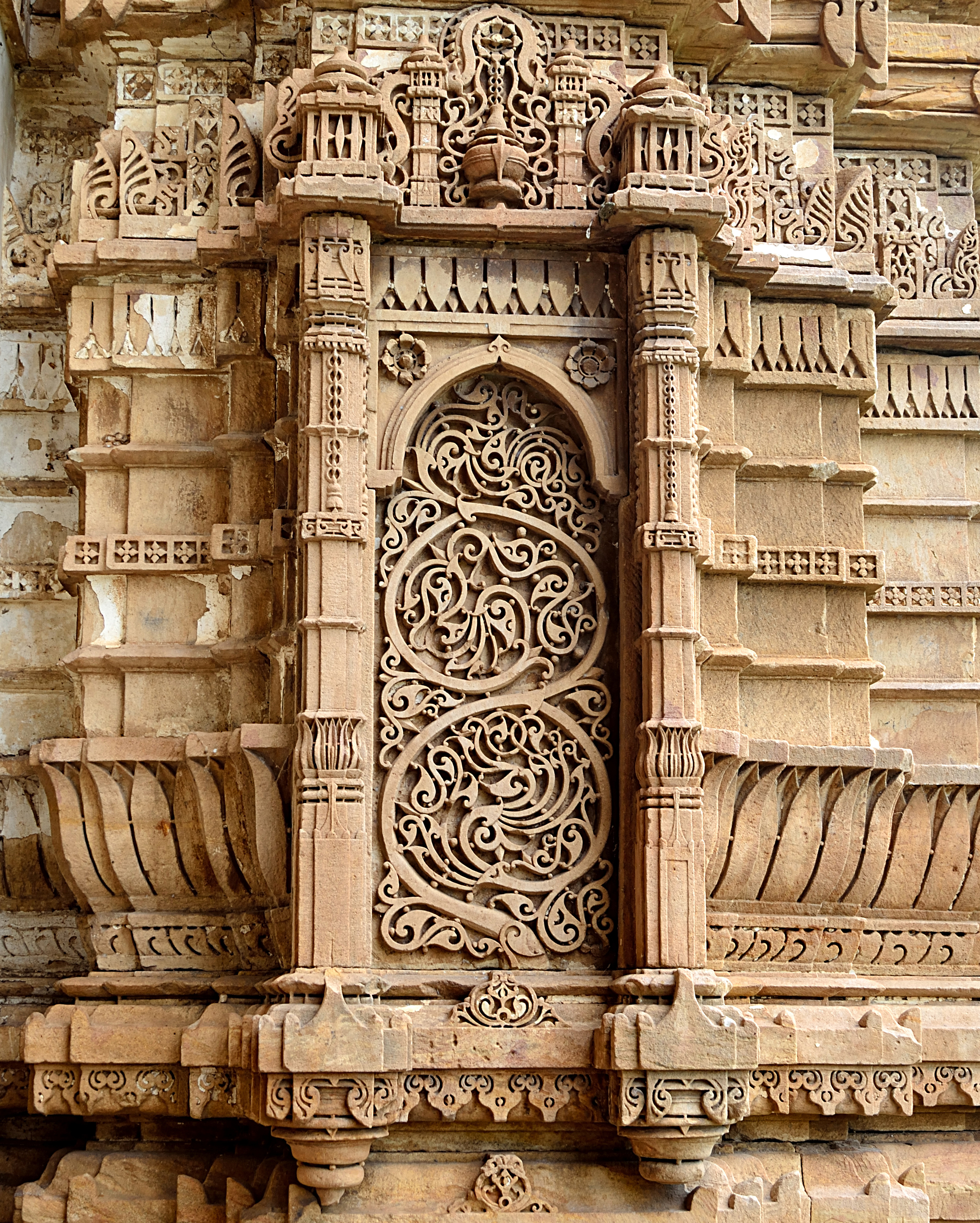
'Jaali' design at minar base

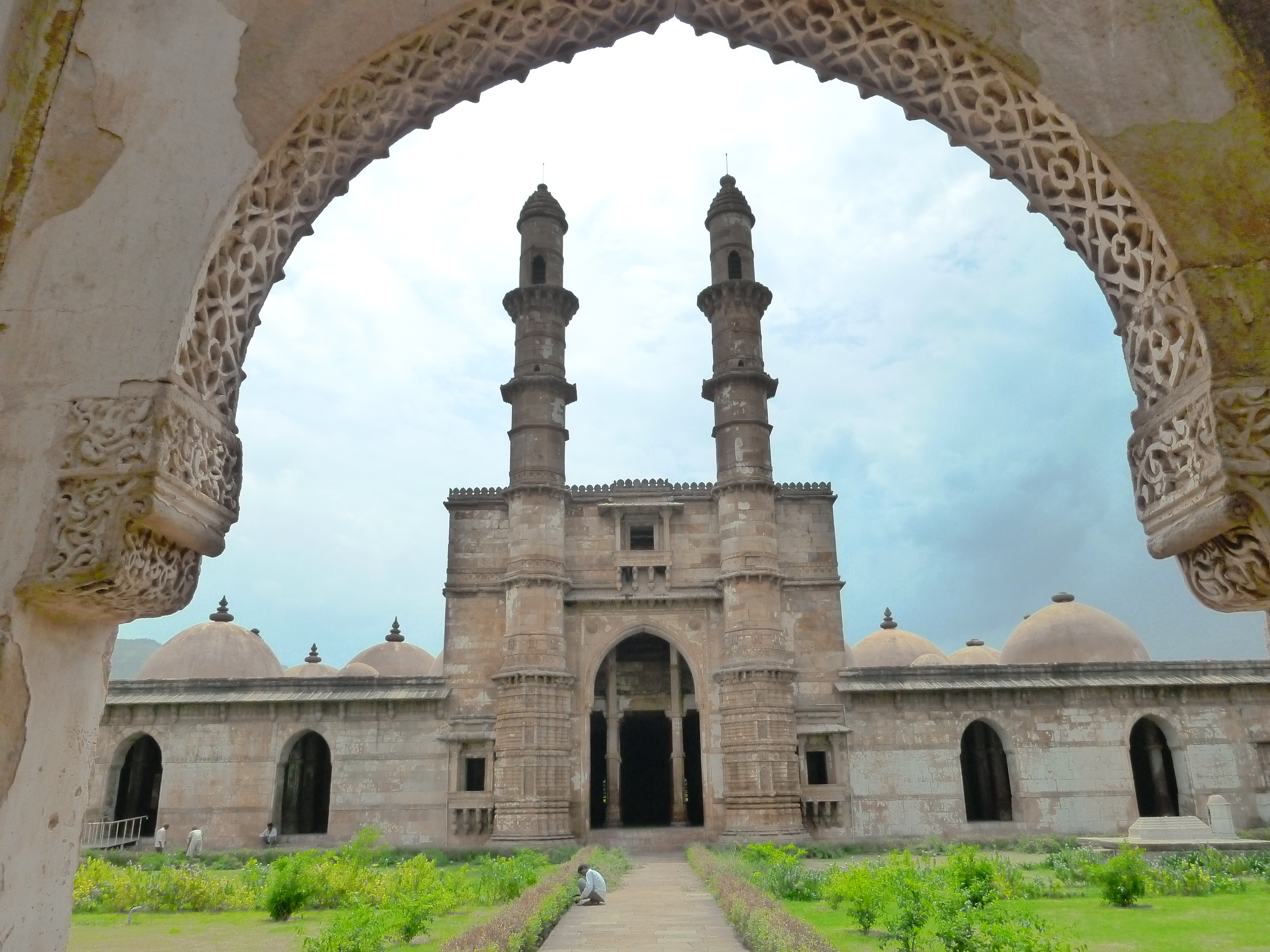
Minarets

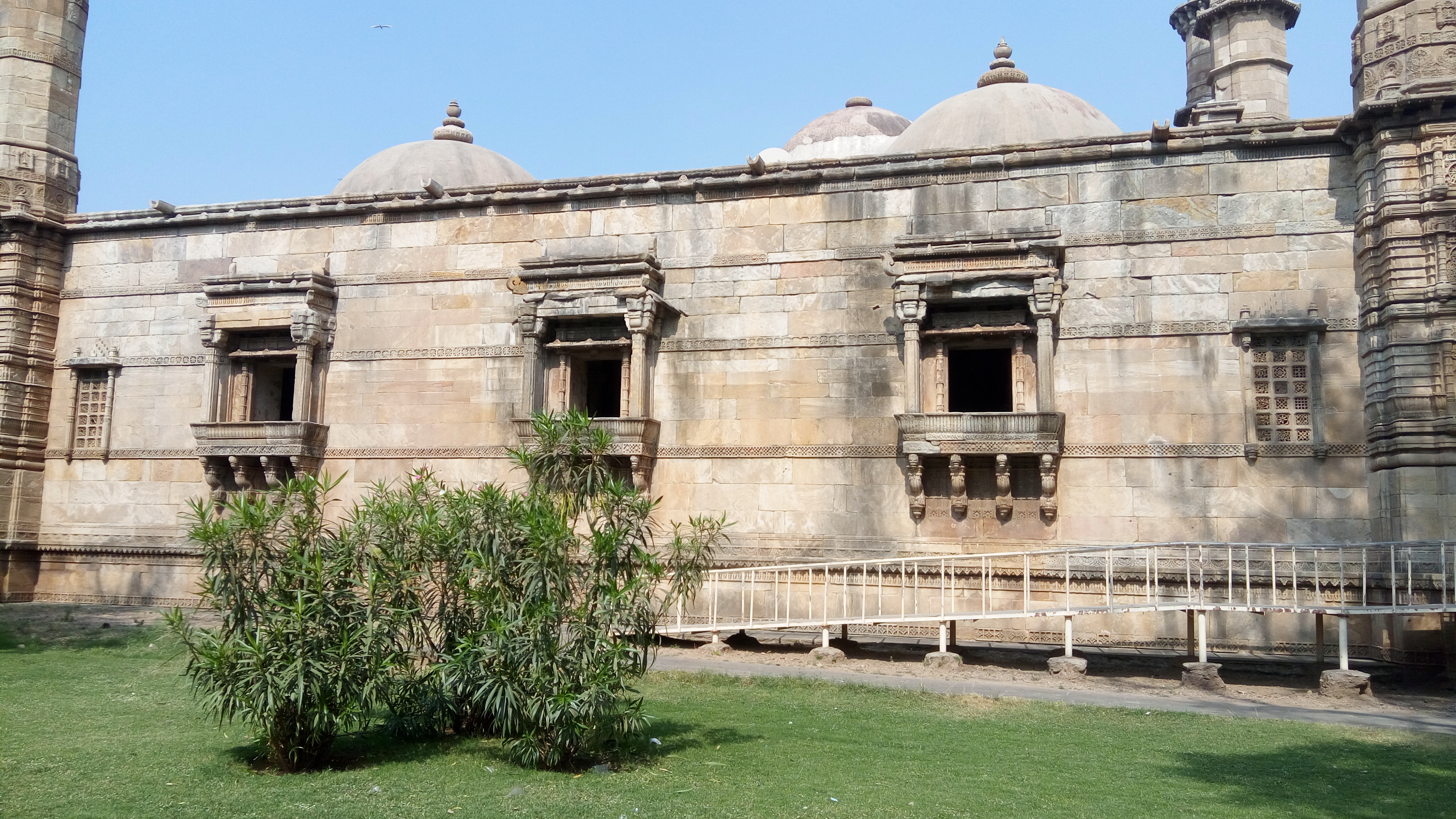

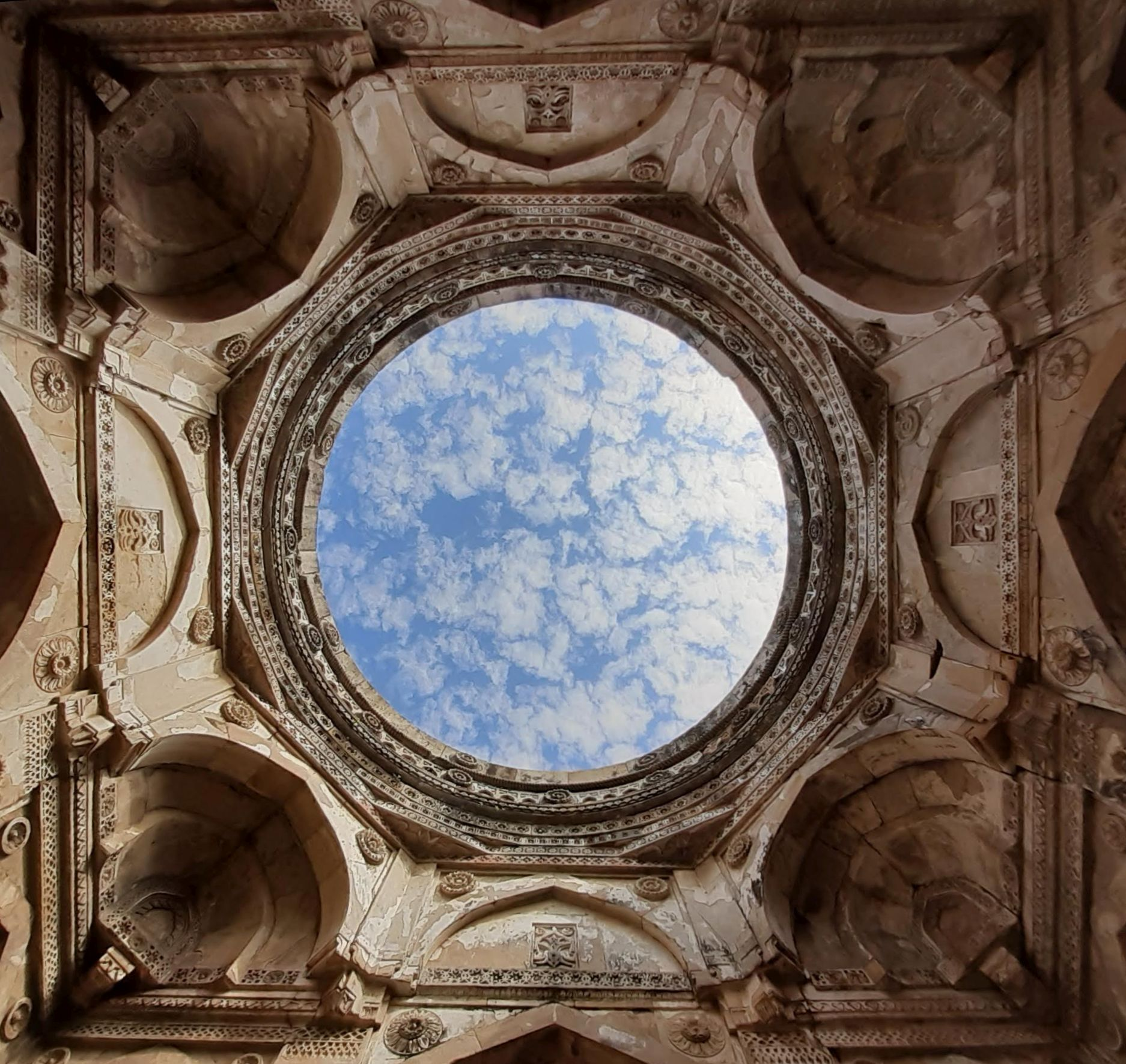
Open roof of the entry hall

== See also ==
- Islam in India
- List of mosques in India
- List of Monuments of National Importance in Gujarat
- Monuments of Champaner-Pavagadh Archaeological Park
