= Chandrashekhar Vijay =

Jain monk, scholar and author from India (1934–2011)

Panyas Chandrashekhar Vijay ji Maharaj Saheb

Personal life
- Born: Indravadan; 18 January 1934 Mumbai, Maharashtra, British Raj
- Died: 8 August 2011 (aged 77) Ahmedabad, Gujarat, India
- Cremation place: Tapovan Sanskarpith, Amiyapur, Gandhinagar
- Parents: Kantilal Jivatlal Pratapshi (father); Subhadraben (mother)
- Notable work: 261 books
- Education: matriculation
- Website: www.yugpradhan.com

Religious life
- Religion: Jainism
- Sect: Śvetāmbara; Tapa Gaccha
- Initiation as Panyas: 15 May 1952; Byculla, Mumbai by Prem Suri

Religious career
- Disciples: 120

Chandrashekhar Vijayji Maharaj Saheb (18 February 1934 – 8 August 2011), also known as Guruma, was a Jain monk, scholar and author. Born and educated in Mumbai, he was initiated as a monk who was later designated Panyas. He was involved in religious as well as social activities. He founded several institutions and authored 261 books.

== Biography ==
He was born on 18 January 1934 (Vikram Samvat 1990, Falgun Sud 5) in Irla Bombay to Subhadraben and Kantilal Jivatlal Pratapshi. His family belonged to Radhanpur in present-day Banaskantha district. His birth name was Indravadan. He studied till matriculation. He was initiated as a Jain monk at the age of 18 years by Prem Suri on 15 May 1952 (Vikram Samvat 2008, Vaisakh Vad 6) at Motisha Jain auditorium, Byculla, Mumbai and was given new name, Chandrashekhar Vijay. Later he was elevated to designation of Panyas on 2 December 1984 (Vikram Samvat 2041, Magshar Sud 10) at Tapovan Sanskardham, Navsari, Gujarat. He was known to be extremely humble, fearless and performed celibacy and was highly devoted to Jain scriptures.

He led a nationwide campaign in 2002–2003 against the plan of opening 56,000 new abattoirs by the Government of India. He initiated 94 disciples as Jain monks. He authored more than 261 books on various subjects including religion, culture, nationalism, history, education, criticism and short stories. He composed more than 100,000 new shloka(s) in Sanskrit. He was well versed in Sanskrit, Law, Karmagranthas, etc.

He performed three Chaturmas at Antariskhji Tirth for its protection and also made strenuous efforts to protect the Samethshikharji, Girnarji and Mashriji Tirth(s). He inspired youths and donors to help the needy in Bundelkhand during its devastating droughts.

He established several religious and socio-cultural organizations such as Akhil Bharatiya Sanskruti Rakshak Dal and Vardhaman Sanskardham. He founded two schools which profess Indian cultural education, Tapovan Sanskardham at Navsari and Tapovan Sanskarpith at Amiyapur near Ahmedabad. He was also considered one of the best orators among Jain monks. He is known to have given sermons to massive crowds of 10,000 to 15,000 people without even using microphones or electronic devices.

He died on 8 August 2011 (12.40 pm) (Vikram Samvat 2067, Shravan Sud 10) at Ambavadi, Ahmedabad. He was cremated at Tapovan Sanskarpith, Amiyapur, Gandhinagar where his memorial temple was constructed later. His funeral was attended by many high profile politicians including the then chief minister of Gujarat Shri Narendra Modi.

Recognising his works, he was awarded the "Yugpradhan Acharyasam" title by the then head of Gachhadhipati, Suri Jayghosh Vijayji Maharaj Saheb.

== Works ==
He has written 261 books. Sadhnani Pagdandie was his first book. To Bharatno Uday Chapatima was his last. He was inspired to start Muktidoot, Virtidoot and Tapal Dwara Tatvagyan magazines. Nyaay Sidhaant Muktavali, Avacchedkatva Niryukti and Samanya Niryukti are his books on Nyaya philosophy.
