= Nemisuri =

Indian Jain ascetic (1872–1948)

Śāsana Samrāt Ācārya Nemisuri Mahārāja Sāheb
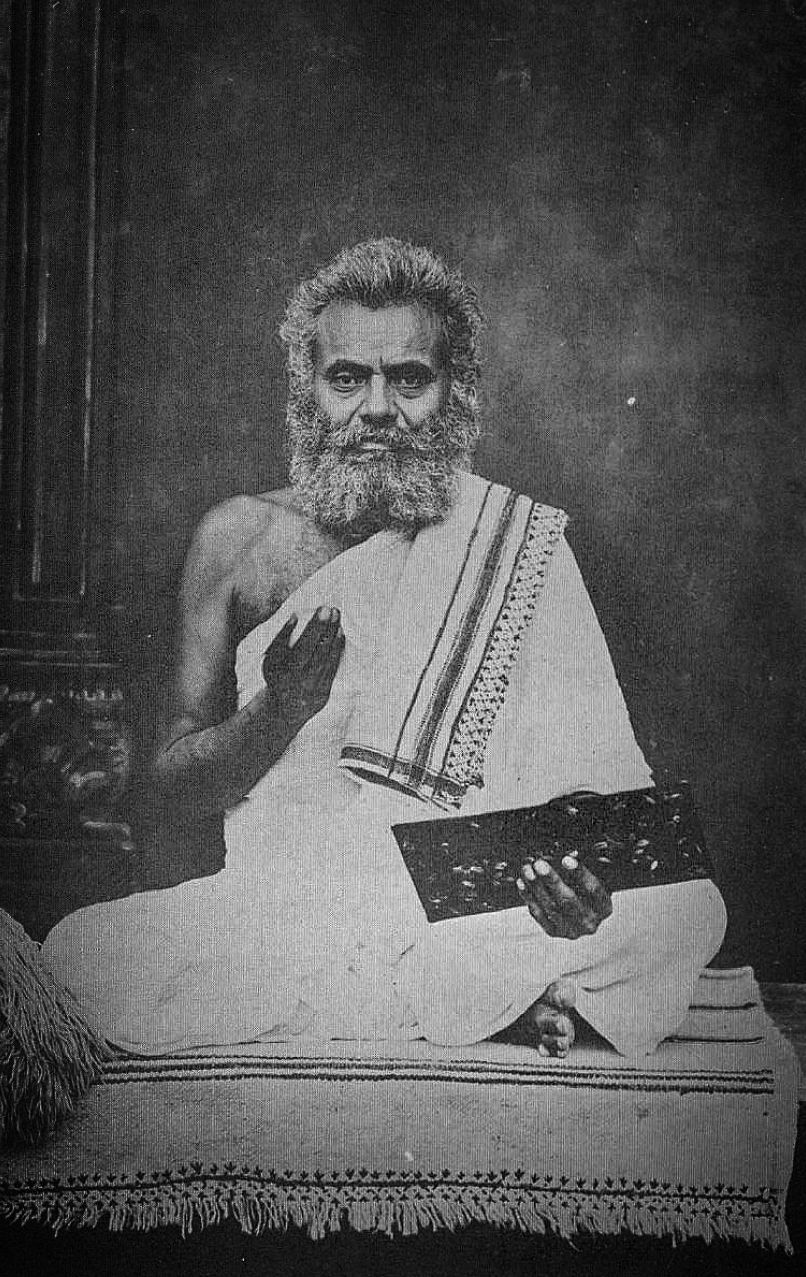
- Śāsana Samrāt Ācārya Nemisuri Mahārāja Sāheb

Personal life
- Born: Nemchand; 1872 CE Mahuva, Bhavnagar, Gujarat, India
- Died: 1948 CE
- Parents: Laxmichandbhai (father); Diwaliben (mother)
- Known for: Protection of major Jain pilgrimage sites such as Girnar, Taranga, Palitana, Antariksh Parshvanatha Temple at Shirpur

Religious life
- Religion: Jainism
- Sect: Śvetāmbara; Tapa Gaccha
- Initiation: 1888 CE by Vruddhichandraji

Religious career
- Predecessor: Vruddhichandraji

Śāsana Samrāt Ācārya Nemisuri Mahārāja Sāheb was a 20th century CE Śvetāmbara Jain ascetic, philosopher, researcher, reformer, and the head of the Tapa Gaccha. He is best known for his efforts in preserving the Jain literature and protection of major pilgrimage sites such as Palitana temples, Girnar Jain temples, and Taranga Jain temples.

== Early life and education ==
He was born on the Jain New Year's day which falls on the first day of the bright half of the Kartika month, in the year 1872 CE in Mahuva, Gujarat. He was named Nemchand by his parents Diwaliben and Laxmichandbhai.

He received his early education in vernacular and English medium schools before pursuing business endeavors in the stock market. However, his interest soon shifted towards Sanskrit and religious studies, leading him to study under Jain ascetic Vruddhichandraji in Bhavnagar.

== Initiation ==
He was constantly surrounded by his preceptor and other ascetics. He devoutly studied Sanskrit, Prakrit and Jain scriptures. This began infusing a feeling of detachment from worldly life in him. This feeling increased with every passing day and when his father wrote to him about the passing of his grandmother, he responded by writing back that the worldly life was meaningless and that only diligence in religious studies proves to be meaningful.

His father felt that if Nemchand stayed in Bhavnagar anymore, he would turn towards monkhood, so he called him back. He sternly denied permission for renunciation. Nemchand and his friend Durlabhji, who was also desirous of monkhood, ran away to Bhavnagar to meet their preceptor.

Since Durlabhji's father had already died, he did not face troubles and was initiated into the Chaturvidha Sangha. However, Vruddhichandraji denied initiation to Nemchand without his parents' permission. Nemchand wore a monk's dress and came to his preceptor. Looking at his courage, he initiated him into the Chaturvidha Sangha on the 7th day of the bright half of the Jyeshtha month in the year 1888 CE. Upon initiation, his name was changed to Muni Nemvijaya. The rajoharan that was given to him was used by Ganivarya Muktivijaya (a monk in lineage of Acharya Jagatchandrasuri) earlier, a revered ascetic of the Tapa Gaccha.

== Ascetic life ==
=== Spiritual endeavors as a junior monk ===
As a young ascetic, Nemvijaya studied scriptures and eventually became a Sanskrit and Prakrit scholar. In the Chaturvidha Sangha, he is known for his strict discipline and austere religious practices. He is said to have preached non-followers and followers of Jainism about the core Jain principles of non-violence and celibacy. Along with scriptural studies, he is said to have had observed ashta-pravanchanamata. He is also said to have studied Siddhanta-chandrika and Siddhanta-kaumudi to learn grammar and later, Magha-naishadha.

In 1890 CE, his preceptor sent him to Ahmedabad for yogodvahan under Panyas Pratapvijaya before his vadi-diksha. After he returned to Bhavnagar, Danvijaya, a disciple of Ganivarya Muktivijaya, noticed Nemvijaya's keenness to learn. Later, he set up a religious school named 'Shree Buddhisinhji Jain Sanskrit Pathshala' at Palitana and requested Nemvijaya's preceptor to send him there to teach logic and grammar to other ascetics. After his preceptor died, he studied Siddha-Hema-Shabdanushasana, Hemachandra's work on grammar. Later, he initiated the rituals of 'Gyaan-Sadhna' and 'Shaastrabhyaas.' He also revived the tradition of 'Yogodvahana.'

=== Consecration as Gaṇīvarya and Panyās ===
Vruddhichandraji, Nemvijaya's preceptor, had requested Panyas Gambhirvijaya, his senior-most disciple, to assist Nemvijaya for a yogodvahana of aagamas. As a result, in 1900 CE, Nemvijaya underwent yogodvahana of aagamas, beginning at Ahmedabad. The ritual concluded in 1902 CE, when he had performed a yoga of all canonical scriptures of the Śvetāmbaras except Vyākhyāprajñapti.

In 1903 CE, he underwent the yoga of Vyākhyāprajñapti and was offered the position of a Gaṇīvarya at Vallabhi. Soon after that, he was offered the position of Panyās.

=== Consecration as Ācārya ===
There was no competent Ācārya in Tapa Gaccha after Ācārya Vijayanandsuri had died in 1896 CE. Panyās Gambhirvijaya and ascetic Manivijaya thought Nemvijaya to be fit for this position. In 1907 CE, this proposal was presented before the sangha at the sixth 'Akhil Bharatiya Jain Shwetambar Murtipujaka Conference.' It was accepted and Nemvijaya was then inducted into a ritual of 'Navpada Oli' of Surimantra-pancha-prasthana, a ritual necessary for the installation of an Ācārya. In 1907 CE, Nemvijaya was consecrated as an Ācārya and was renamed as Nemisuri.

He became the first Ācārya to have undergone the ritual of 'yogodvahana' after a long spell of absence of such Ācāryas in the Tapa Gaccha. He is also said to have had been a strict disciplinarian in training his disciples.

=== Spiritual endeavors after consecration as Ācārya ===
After becoming an Ācārya, Nemisuri stayed and worked mostly in Ahmedabad, Saurashtra, and Khambhat. He inspired the establishment of several libraries holding Jain literature in these regions and inspired the renovation of temples and pilgrimage sites of historical importance.

He preached the principles of Jainism to fishermen living on the coastline of Gujarat. A few thousand fishermen are said to have given up the profession and take up Jainism. A fisherman turned a Jain monk Acharya Rajtilaksuri is an example of such influence. After being preached by Nemisuri, fishermen of Datha burned their nets to mark a change in their career. He also strongly opposed the practice of animal sacrifice. He also raised several lakhs of rupees to build, maintain, and settle debts of sanctuaries and shelter homes for animals.

He is also said to have brought about harmony in the community and between sects of Jainism by resolving several disputes amongst castes and Jain sanghas through arbitration throughout India. In 1933 CE, he also led a muni-sammelan (transl. conference of ascetics) to resolve quarrels within different groups of ascetics and is said to have brought about harmony and unity within Jain ascetics.

As an Ācārya, he aimed to revive the tradition of virtuous, disciplined, and knowledgeable disciples. Consequently, he groomed several disciples through strict disciplinary practices. Prabhashankar Patni had considered Nemisuri as his preceptor and is often said to have advised his son to visit Nemisuri to seek guidance when troubled. He also preached several kings, princes, and eminent scholars such as Madan Mohan Malaviya. He propagated and gave scriptural evidence that the idol-worshipping sect was the only true path to moksha. Moved by his speech, thousands of followers of the newly-formed aniconic sects turned back to the idol-worshipping sect and became Murtipujaka again. During his time, only 25-30 ascetics were following the correct conduct as per the Śvetāmbara canon. An exponential increase in the number of such ascetics as seen today is attributed to Nemisuri, Vijayanandsuri, Rajendrasuri, Kamalsuri, and Gautamsagarsuri of Achal Gaccha.

== Preservation of Jain literature ==
Nemisuri is said to have pioneered the publishing of Jain literature for ascetics and for the laypeople. He is also said to have inspired the establishment of several hundred pathshalas (transl. religious classes) for lay-followers of Jainism in Gujarat and Rajasthan. Such classes were meant for lay-followers of all ages and gender who wished to learn the scriptural tenets of Jainism.

In addition to the establishment of religious classes, Nemisuri inspired the establishment of several libraries to hold and preserve ancient manuscripts of canonical and non-canonical scriptures of Śvetāmbaras across Gujarat and Rajasthan. This led to a large-scale publication as well as preservation of Jain literature.

Apart from the establishment of religious classes and libraries and authoring several non-canonical scriptures of the Śvetāmbara sect, he supported a large-scale publication of Jain literature authored by the most prominent Śvetāmbara Jain ascetics such as Ācārya Hemachandrasuri, Ācārya Haribhadrasuri, and Mahopadhyaya Yashovijaya. With the publication of Jain literature, he was able to revive several rites and rituals such as anjan-shalaka, siddhachakra-pujan, and arihant-mahapujan which were lost over time due to limited access to literature. He also revived the tradition of 'yogodvahana' which was lost and was limited to very few ascetics for several years.

== Protection of pilgrimage sites ==
He was actively involved in preserving Śvetāmbaras' Jain heritage in Western India. He mainly worked on pilgrimage sites such as Matara, Sherisa, Vamaj, Kaparda, and Kadambagiri. Major Jain pilgrimage sites such as Palitana temples, Girnar Jain temples, Taranga Jain temple, and Shikharji were renovated under his supervision. He also actively guided Shri Anandji Kalyanji Pedhi in maintaining several Śvetāmbara pilgrimage sites across India. He preached and inspired kings and royalties of princely states of Jaisalmer, Udaipur, Bhavnagar, and Vallabhi to protect animals as well as sites of pilgrimage and heritage.

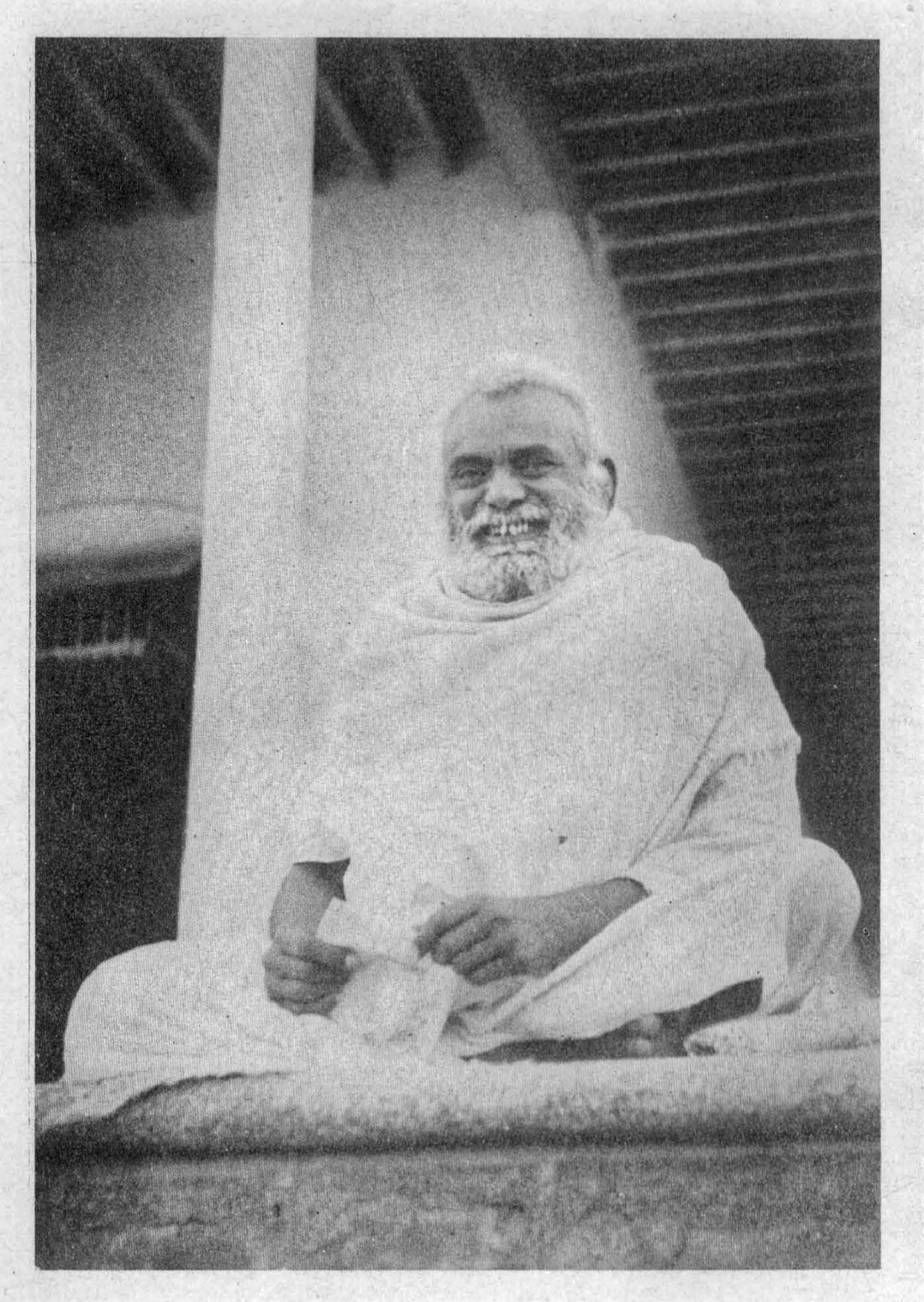
Photo of Ācārya Nemisuri clicked by Krishnakumār Sinh, the then king of Bhavnagar

The Kadambagiri pilgrimage site was under a community of Darbars. Inspired by Nemisuri's sermons, they offered him a few plots of land on the mountain to facilitate reconstruction and renovation of the Jain temples atop the hill. He directed them to sell it to Shri Anandji Kalyanji Pedhi instead, citing Jain monks' vow of non-possession.

== Literary contributions ==
Several non-canonical scriptures of the Śvetāmbara school are attributed to him. Some of them are as follows: -

1. Saptabhangiprabha
2. Nyayasindhu
3. Laghu Hemprabha Vyakarana

== Death and legacy ==
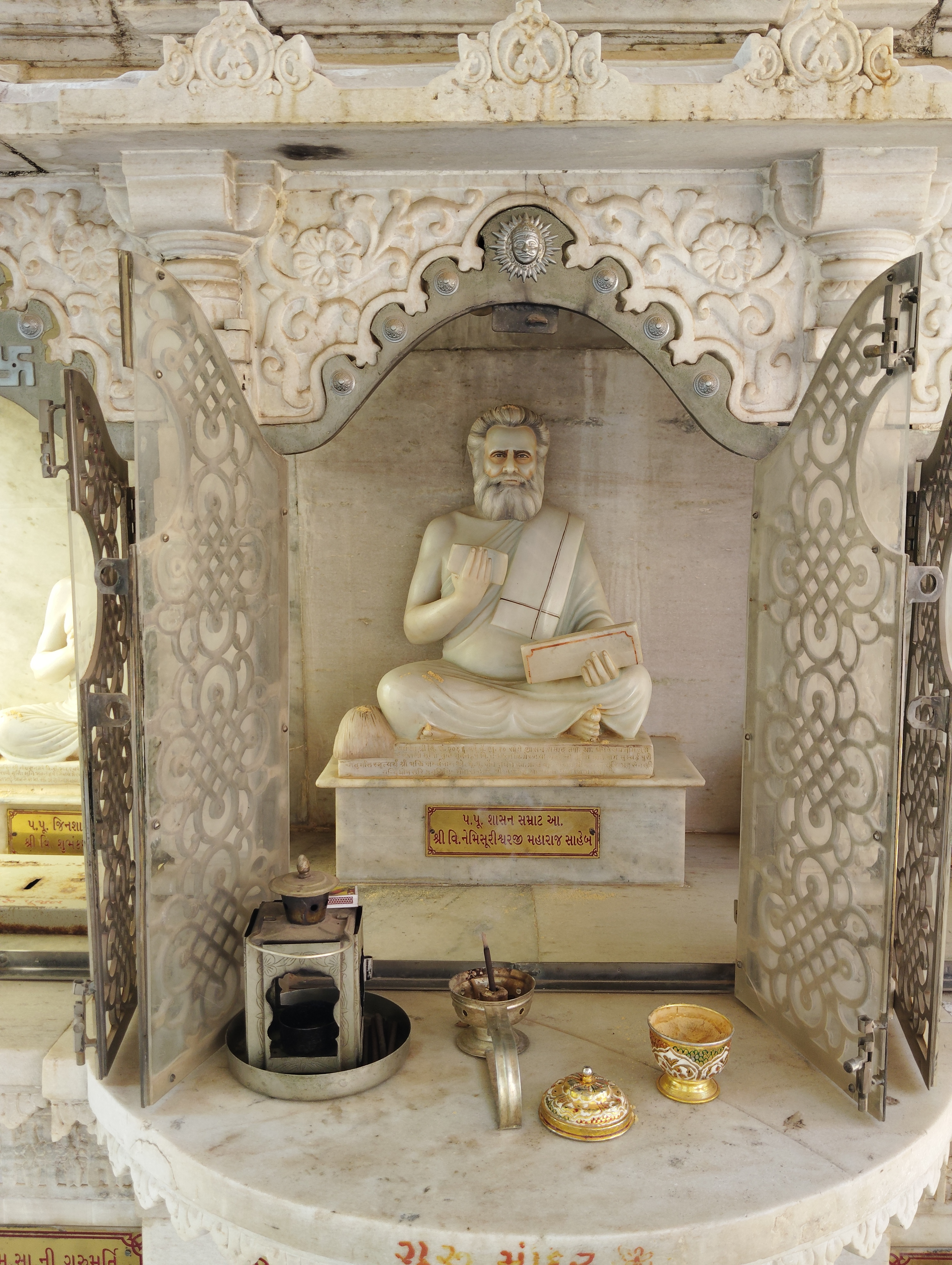
Idol of Aacharya Vijay Nemisuri ji at Vasupujya Jain temple, Godhra

In 1948 CE, he was at Mahuva for his chaturmasya. His disciples Nandansuri and Udayasuri were looking after a weak and bed-ridden Nemisuri. At 7:00pm on the day of Diwali in 1948 CE, he died near the spot of his birth. Two temples were erected, one at the spot of his birth and another at the site of his cremation. A shrine dedicated to him and with his footsteps was also erected at the spot of his death.

For his guidance on diverse matters such as preserving pilgrimage sites, Jain literature and his austere conduct as a monk, Nemisuri was given the title of "Suri Chakravartin" (transl. King of Suris (or Ācāryas)).

A 170-verse-long biographical Sanskrit poem named "Namu Guru Nemisuri Sansarma" dedicated to Nemisuri was composed by Ācārya Shilchandrasuri. He also authored a comprehensive biography of Nemisuri named "Śāsana Samrāt" in Gujarati. He also described a ritual for worshipping the idols of Nemisuri through "Ashtaprakari Gurupuja". Another biography of Nemisuri was written by Jain monk Niranjanvijaya. Nemisuri served as an inspiration for several Jain ascetics later as well. Ramanlal Shah, a lay follower of Nemisuri also wrote a short biography of him. Another biography of Nemisuri was written by Acharya Kulchandrasuri.

Books at "Nemisuri Gyaanshala" are displayed at the annual celebration of Jñāna Panchami in Khambhat. A website dedicated to his work, and media related to him was also created in 2023 - "Mandan Parivar", an initiative by Ganivarya Trailokyamandanvijaya, a monk of Nemisuri's community, is a trust that performs works of charity and spreading the word of Jainism.

== See also ==
- Ratnaprabhasuri
- Vimalsuri
- Bappabhattisuri
