= Vallabhsuri =

19th century Indian Jain ascetic

Acharya Vallabh Suri
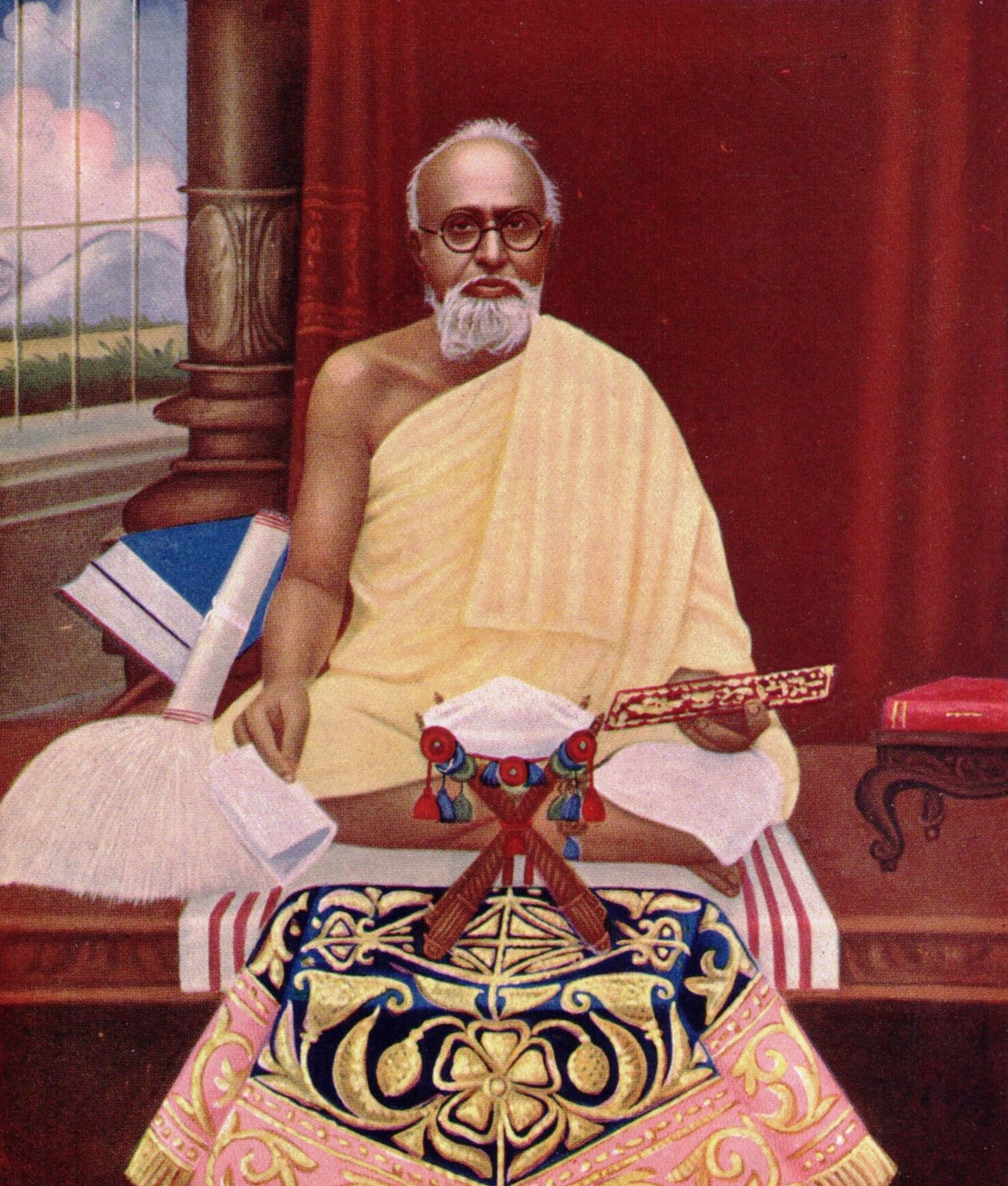
- Official name: Acharya Vijay Vallabhsuri

Personal life
- Born: Chhagan; October 26, 1870 Baroda (now Vadodara, Gujarat, India)
- Died: 22 September 1954 (aged 83) Byculla, Bombay (now Mumbai)
- Parents: Deepchand (father); Ichchhabai (mother)

Religious life
- Religion: Jainism
- Sect: Śvetāmbara
- Initiation: Vallabhvijay; 5 May 1887; Radhanpur by Vijayanandsuri (Atmaram)

Religious career
- Successor: Samudra Suri

Acharya Vijay Vallabhsuri (Vijayavallabhasūri; 26 October 1870 – 22 September 1954) was a Jain monk. He was a disciple of Vijayanandsuri. He worked in Punjab so he was given honorific Punjab Kesari.

== Biography ==
Vallabhsuri was born on 26 October 1870 (Second day of bright half of Kartik month, Vikram Samvat 1927) at Vadodara, Gujarat. He was named Chhagan. His parents Deepchand and Ichhabai died in his early years.

He met Vijayanandsuri, a monk in the lineage of Jagatchandrasuri, the founder of Tapa Gaccha, at Janisheri Jain Upashray, Vadodara. At the age of seventeen, he was initiated as a Jain monk and named Muni Vallabhvijay on 5 May 1887 (Jayesth Vad 9, Vikram Samvat 1944) at Radhanpur by Vijayanandsuri and he became a disciple of Muni Harshvijay. In Vikram Samvat 1981, he was conferred with the title of Acharya on Magshirsh Sudi 5 by Sumativijay at Lahore. He also had the title of Pattadhar conferred on him by Jain sangha.

Vallabhsuri was in Gujranwala for Chaturmas in 1947. Due to the partition of India, Gujaranwala fell in Pakistan. There was a widespread communal violence across both nations. He refused to travel by aeroplane which was arranged by the Government of India as Jain monks do not use vehicles. He travelled by foot along with other Jains of Gujaranwala and entered India via the Wagah Border and reached Amritsar in September 1947.

Vallabhsuri placed emphasis on education and inspired Jains to build more educational institutions. He is well known as the founder of Shree Parshwanath Jain Vidyalaya in 1927 at Varkana Village in Pali district of Rajasthan. The seed which he sowed has taken shape of a dense tree in Godwad area of Rajasthan. He founded Mahavir Jain Vidyalaya (at Mumbai, Vadodara, Pune), Parshwanath Umed Mahavidyalaya (at Falna), Atmanand Jain College (at Ambala, Malerkotla), Atmanand Jain High School (Ludhiana, Ambala, Malerkotla, Bagwada, Hoshiarpur, Jandiala Guru) and other educational institutes. He wrote some books and religious texts in Hindi, Gujarati, Punjabi Languages. He also established the Atmanand Jain Sabha. He was also instrumental in establishing Jain unity and accessibility of Jain literature. He supported Mahatma Gandhi's non-violent movement for independence of India.

He died on 22 September 1954 (Bhadrapad Vadi 11, Vikram Samvat 2010), Tuesday at 2:32 am in Byculla, Mumbai. More than two lakh people attended his funereal procession. A memorial dedicated to him was built there later.

== Recognition ==
Shri Atma Vallabh Jain Smarak, a memorial shrine in Delhi, was erected to honour him. It is managed by Shree Atma Vallabh Jain Smarak Shikshan Nidhi. The India Post issued a postage stamp of Vallabhsuri on 21 February 2009 which depicted his image along with Vijay Vallabh Smarak as a background image.

The 151 inches (12.6 ft) high statue was installed at the Vijay Vallabh Sadhana Kendra at Jaitpura in Pali, Rajasthan with efforts Nityanandsuri. It is made of ashtadhatu and was inaugurated by Prime Minister Narendra Modi on the 151st birth anniversary of Vallabhsuri on 16 November 2020.

== See also ==
- Tapa Gachchha
