= Ramchandra Suri =

Indian monk and religious scholar (1896–1991)

Acharya Ramchandra Suri

Personal life
- Born: Tribhuvan; 3 March 1896 Dahevan, Gujarat, British India
- Died: 9 August 1991 (aged 95) Ahmedabad, Gujarat
- Parents: Chhotalal (father); Samarath Ben (mother)

Religious life
- Religion: Jainism
- Sect: Śvetāmbara
- Initiation: by Acharya Prem Suri

Ramchandra Suri (3 March 1896 – 9 August 1991) was an Indian monk and scholar of the Tapa Gaccha sub-sect of Śvetāmbara Jainism.

Born in Dahevan village, present-day Gujarat, he was initiated as a monk by Muni Mangalvijayji in 1912. He was a disciple of Prem Suri.

He died on 9 August 1991, leaving behind a spiritual succession called Ramchandra Suri Samuday.
