= Vijayanandsuri =

Indian Jain ascetic (1837–1896)

Acharya Vijayanandsuri
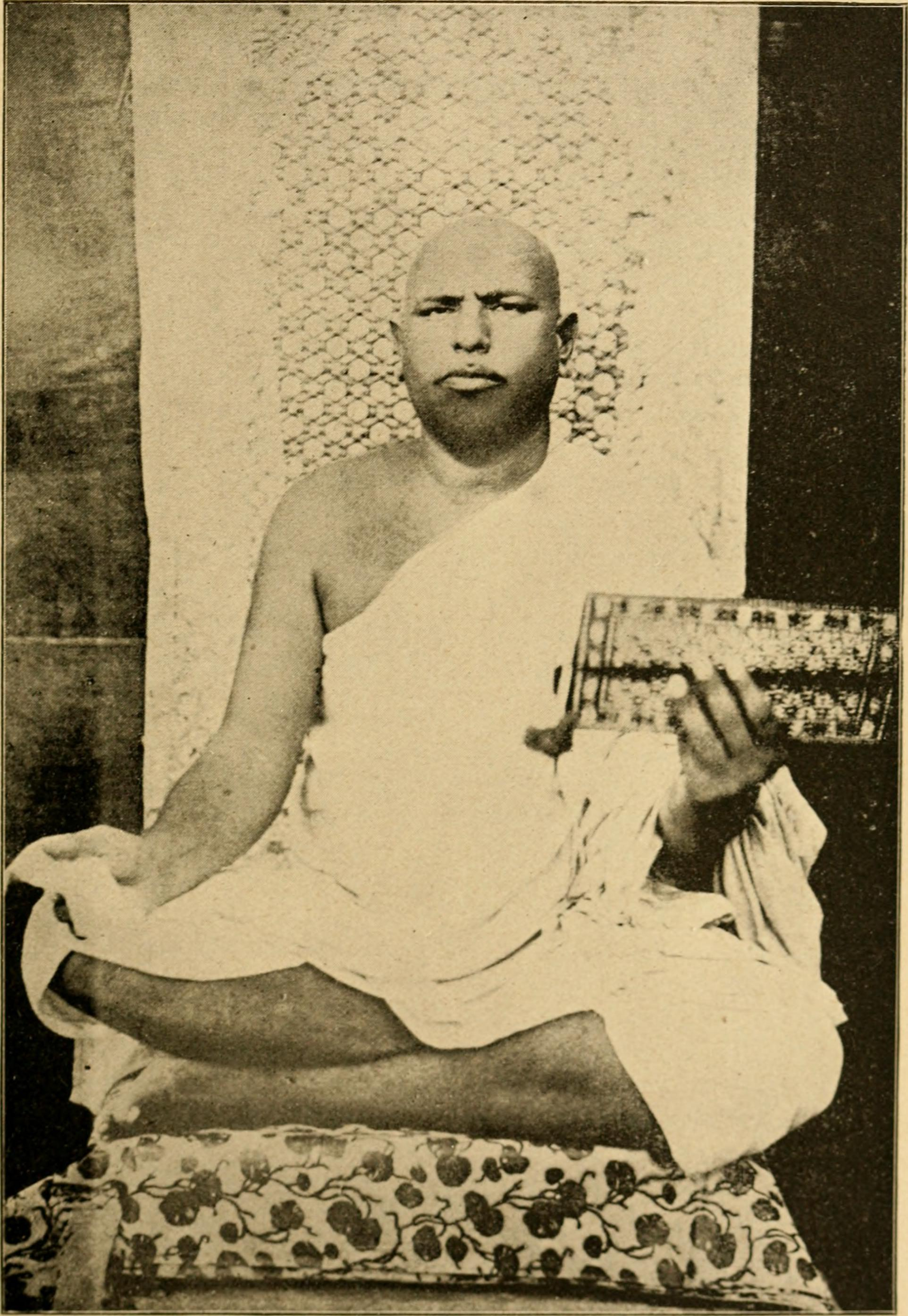
- Official name: Acharya Vijayanand Suri

Personal life
- Born: 6 April 1837 Lehra, Punjab, British India
- Died: 20 May 1896 (aged 59) Gujranwala, Punjab, British India
- Buried: Atmaramji Samadhi (Cremated remains), Gujranwala, Pakistan
- Notable work(s): Jain Tattvadarsh, Agyana Timira Bhaskara, Tattva Nirnaya Prāsād

Religious life
- Religion: Jainism
- Sect: Śvetāmbara
- Initiation: Anandvijay (earlier Atmaram); 1876; Ahmedabad by Muni Buddhivijay

Religious career
- Successor: Vallabhsuri

Acharya Vijayanand Suri (Vijayānandasūri; 6 April 1837 – 20 May 1896), also known as Atmaramji of Gujranwala, was the first Swetambar Murtipujaka Jain monk in modern times to receive the title of Acharya. Born and raised in Punjab, he was initiated as a Sthanakvasi monk and later joined the Murtipujaka tradition. He travelled extensively in Gujarat, Rajputana and Punjab; he organised and reformed Jain community, ascetic orders and literature. He wrote several books in Hindi and was invited to the first World Parliament of Religions in 1893 which was attended by Virchand Gandhi later. He was also known as Ātmānanda and his Sthānakavāsī name was Ātmārāma.

== Early life ==
He was born on 6 April 1837 CE (Chaitra Shukla 1 Vikram Samvat 1893) in Lehara, Punjab to Ganeshchandra and Rupdevi. He was born in a Hindu family. His father was an army official of Ranjit Singh. His father died in his early childhood and he was raised by his mother. He was given to Sheth Jodhmal of Jira, Punjab for education in VS 1903. He studied Hindi and arithmetic. He came into contact with Sthanakvasi monks during his school life. A couple of influential Sthanakavasi monks initiated him in 1853 (VS 1910) at the age of sixteen and was given the name of Atmaram.

== Ascetic career ==
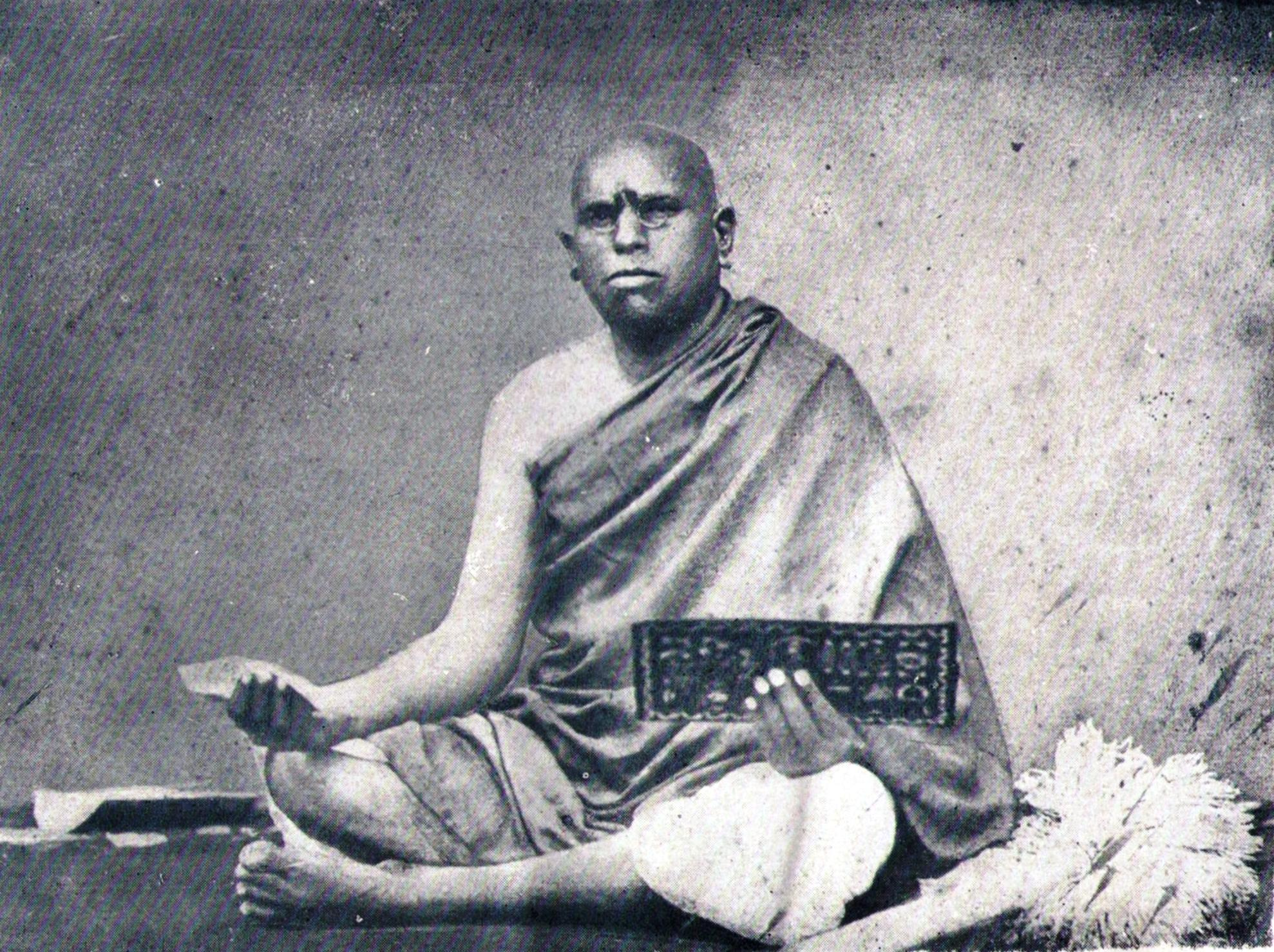
Vijayanandsuri

Atmaram began the study of Jain scriptures along with his fellow ascetics. He was later joined by a Yati of Tapa Gaccha lineage. After several years of study, he was convinced that the Sthanakavasi position of opposition of Idol-worshiping contradicted the scriptures. Later in 1876 (VS 1943), he was initiated again as a Murtipujaka monk in Ahmedabad by Muni Buddhivijay (a monk in lineage of Acharya Jagatchandrasuri), also known as Buterayji of Tapa Gaccha who himself was Sthanakvasi monk before. He was given a new name, Anandvijay.

In 1886, he was conferred the title of Acharya by the congregation of Palitana during his Chaturmas (four months stay during rainy season) there. This was a notable event because since four centuries, there wasn't an ascetic who was conferred with the title of Acharya. He was the first Acharya of contemporary Jain history as till then only Yatis were conferred with the title. As a result of reforms advocated by him, the influence of yatis declined, although the yatis still survive in some locations.

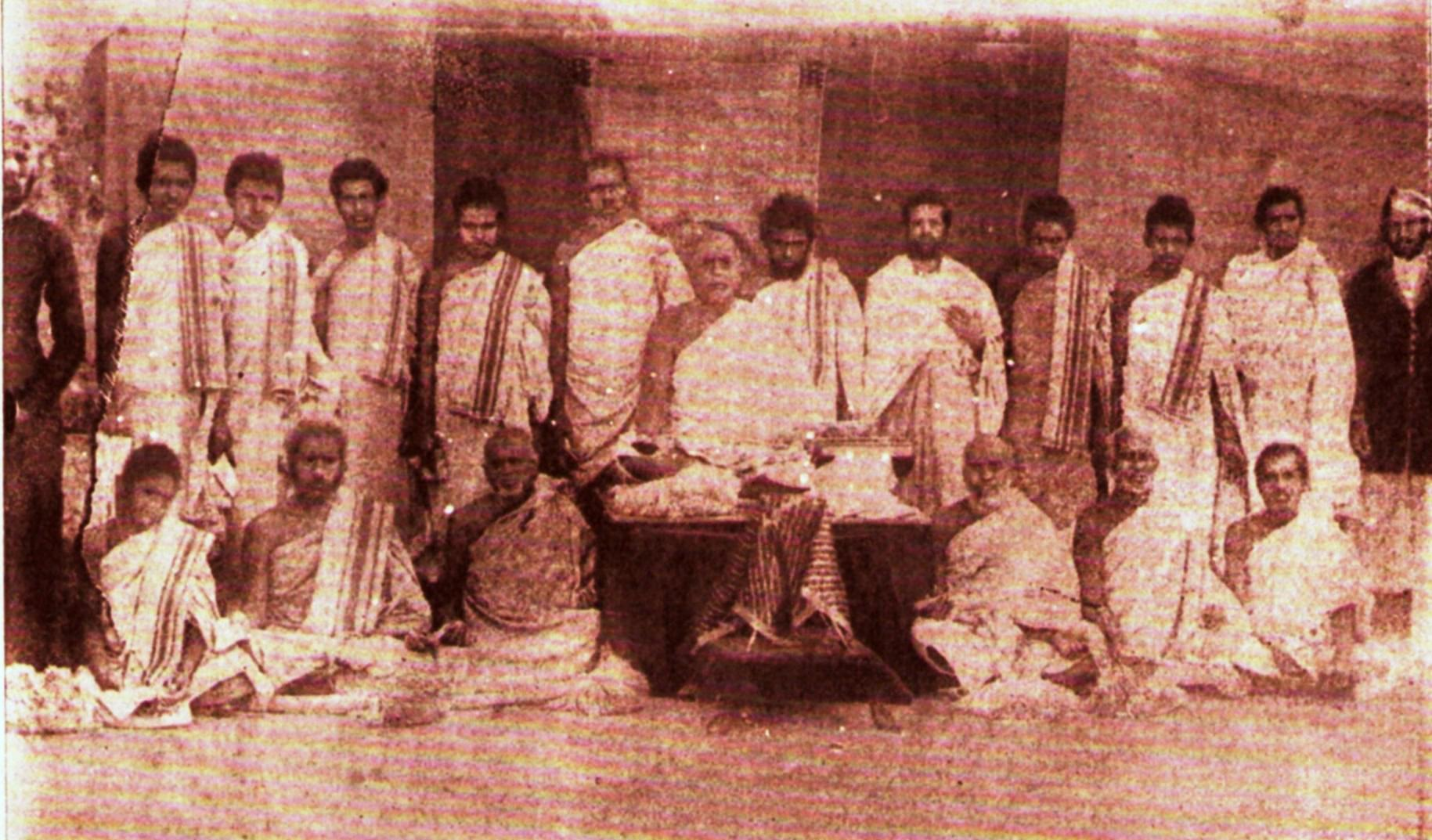
Vijayanandsuri with his disciples in Ajmer in VS 1946 (c. 1889–1890 CE)

He travelled extensively in Gujarat and Punjab. He convinced to open Jain Bhandaras (libraries) with Jain literature kept closed to people for years and had texts copied and examined by scholars. He brought this literature to light and instilled a sense of identity among Jains. In 1893, he was invited to participate in the first ever World Parliament of Religions at Chicago and since Jain monks do not travel overseas he sent Virchand Gandhi to United States to participate in the World Parliament of Religions. He won silver medal in 1893 at Chicago and was covered by many USA periodicals. Based on questions that he had received from the organizers of the Parliament, he wrote a book for the occasion entitled The Chicago-Prashnottar or Questions and Answers on Jainism for the Parliament of Religions Held at Chicago USA in 1893. He was instrumental in reviving the tradition of fully initiated monks (Samvegi sadhu). He also convinced many Sthankvasis in the Punjab to join the Murtipujaka tradition. About 15000 people converted to Jainism due to his efforts. He also encouraged the construction and renovation of Jain temples. He had helped orientalist Rudolf Hoernlé in his studies on Jainism. He died in Gujranwala (now in Pakistan) on 20 May 1896 (Jayeshtha Shukla 8 VS 1953). A memorial shrine dedicated to him was built there by Lala Mayadas Nanakchand Bhabras. His footprints along with the chhatri (cenotaph) over them, are moved to Lahore Fort Museum. Some artefacts and decorations were also moved. The shrine was mistakenly identified as the memorial of Punjab ruler Ranjit Singh's grandfather Charat Singh.

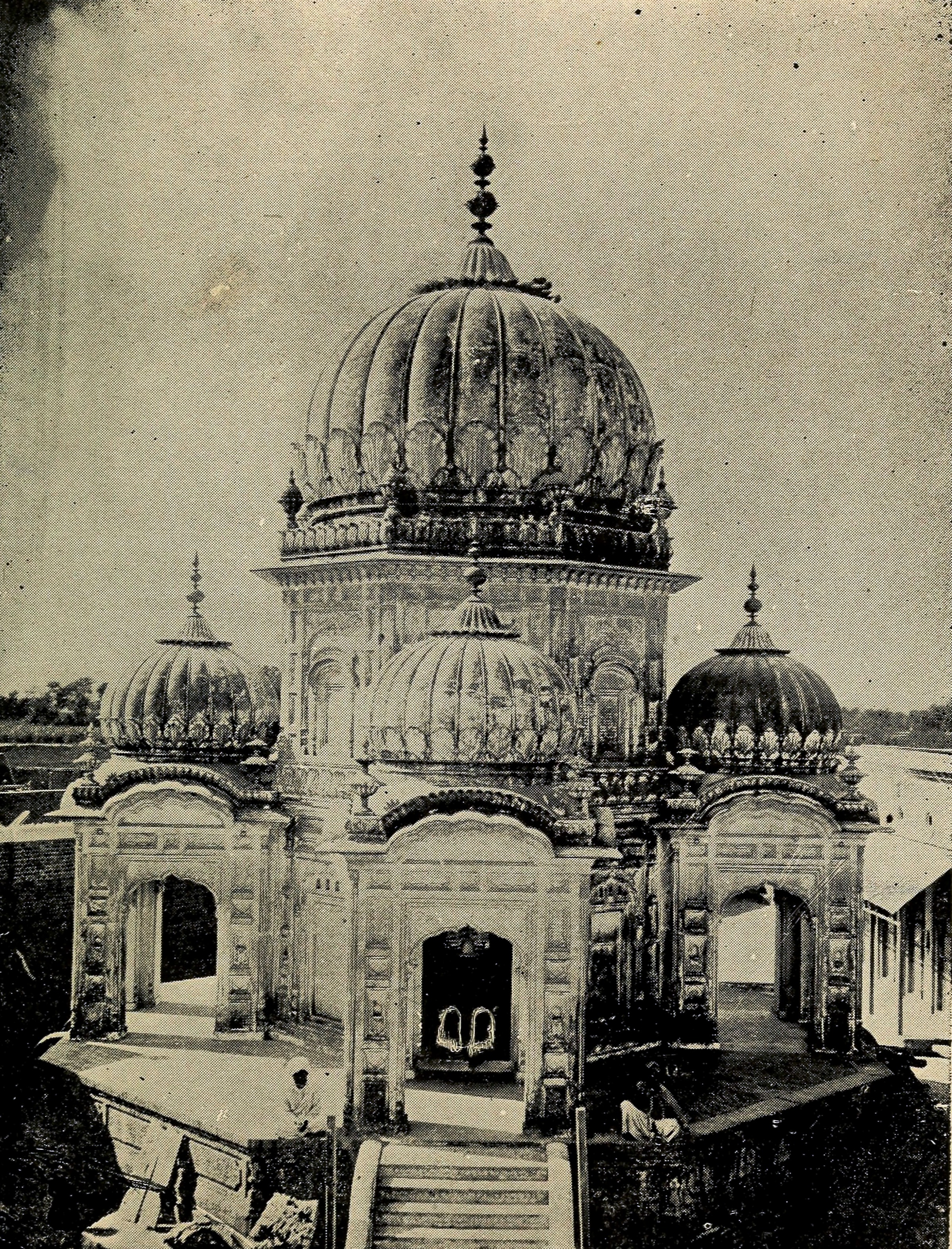
Memorial shrine in Gujranwala. From Chicago Prashnottar, 1918

The shrine came under the local police in 1984 and used as a police station until 2003 when most offices were moved to new place. The central chamber was used as an office of the Gujranwala Deputy Police Superintendent. The building was used by traffic police until 2015. In 2019, it was declared as a protected monument by the Government of Punjab, Pakistan. The samadhi was visited by Jain Acharya Gachadhipati Dharmadhurandhar Suri on May 28, 2023, along with other Jain munis and lay Jains after a gap to more than 75 years.

== Works ==
He wrote a number of books in Hindi, including The Chicago-Prashnottar or Questions and Answers on Jainism for the Parliament of Religions Held at Chicago USA in 1893 which was translated into English and published in 1918. His other important works are Jain Tattvadarsh, Agyana Timira Bhaskara, Samyaktva-shalyadwara and Tattva Nirnaya Prāsād.

== Legacy ==
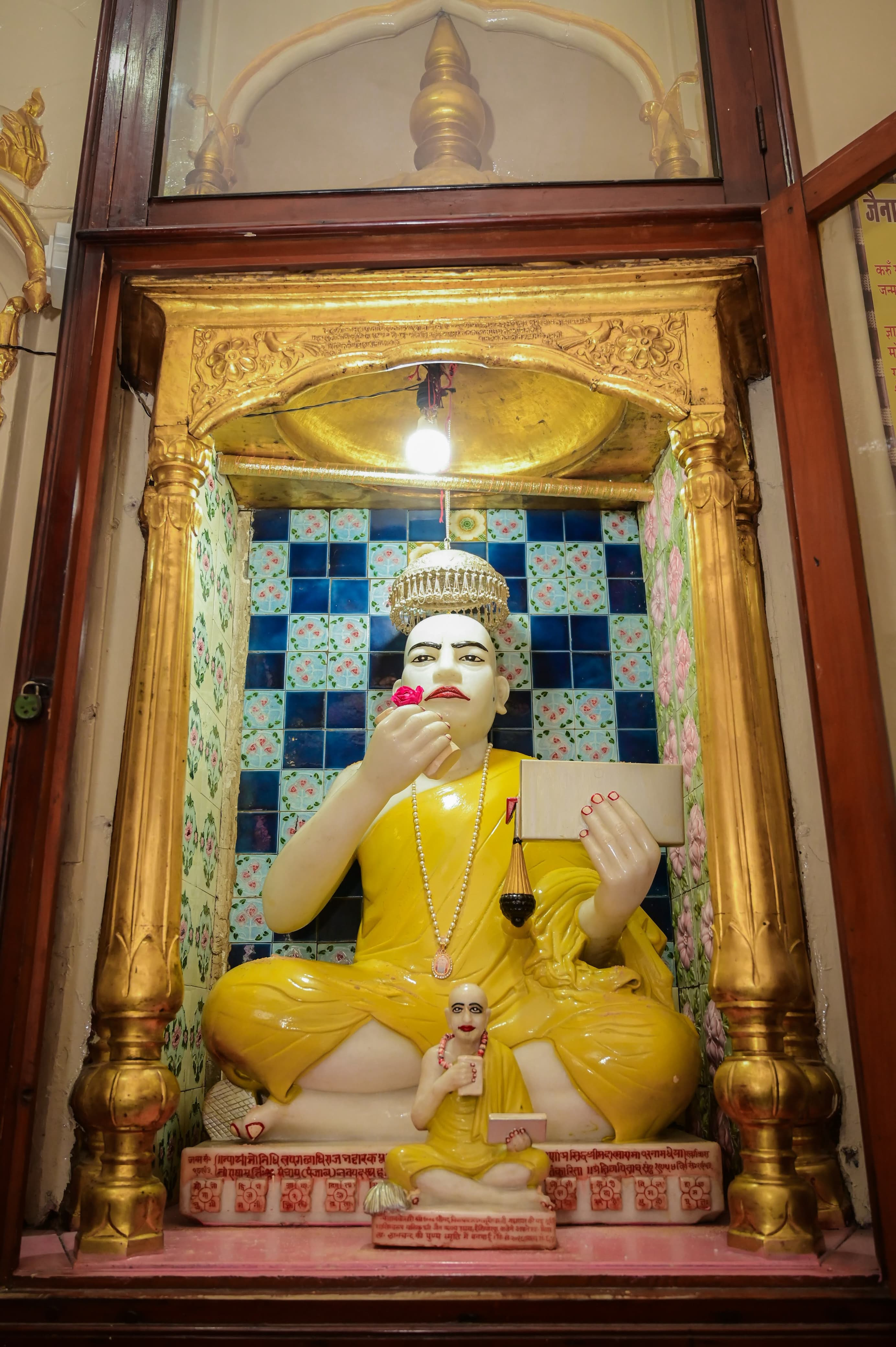
Idol of Vijayanandsuriji at Jain Golden Temple,Hosiyarpur,Punjab

He used to give more importance to education and established several libraries and Pathshala (religious schools) in Punjab. Later Vallabhsuri, his disciple, built many schools, hospitals and educational institutes. He was given the title of Navyug Nirmata (builder of a new era) by Vallabhsuri.

His monkhood lineage has large number of ascetics which roughly covers 1/4 of all current ascetics of Tapa Gaccha. Major ascetic groupings are Atma-Vallabh Samuday, Prem-Ramchandra Suri and Prem-Bhuvanbhanu Suri Samuday.

== See also ==
- Devardhigani Kshamashraman
- Hemachandra
- Hiravijaya
- Yashovijaya
