= Shri Atma Vallabh Jain Smarak =

Jain temple in Delhi, India

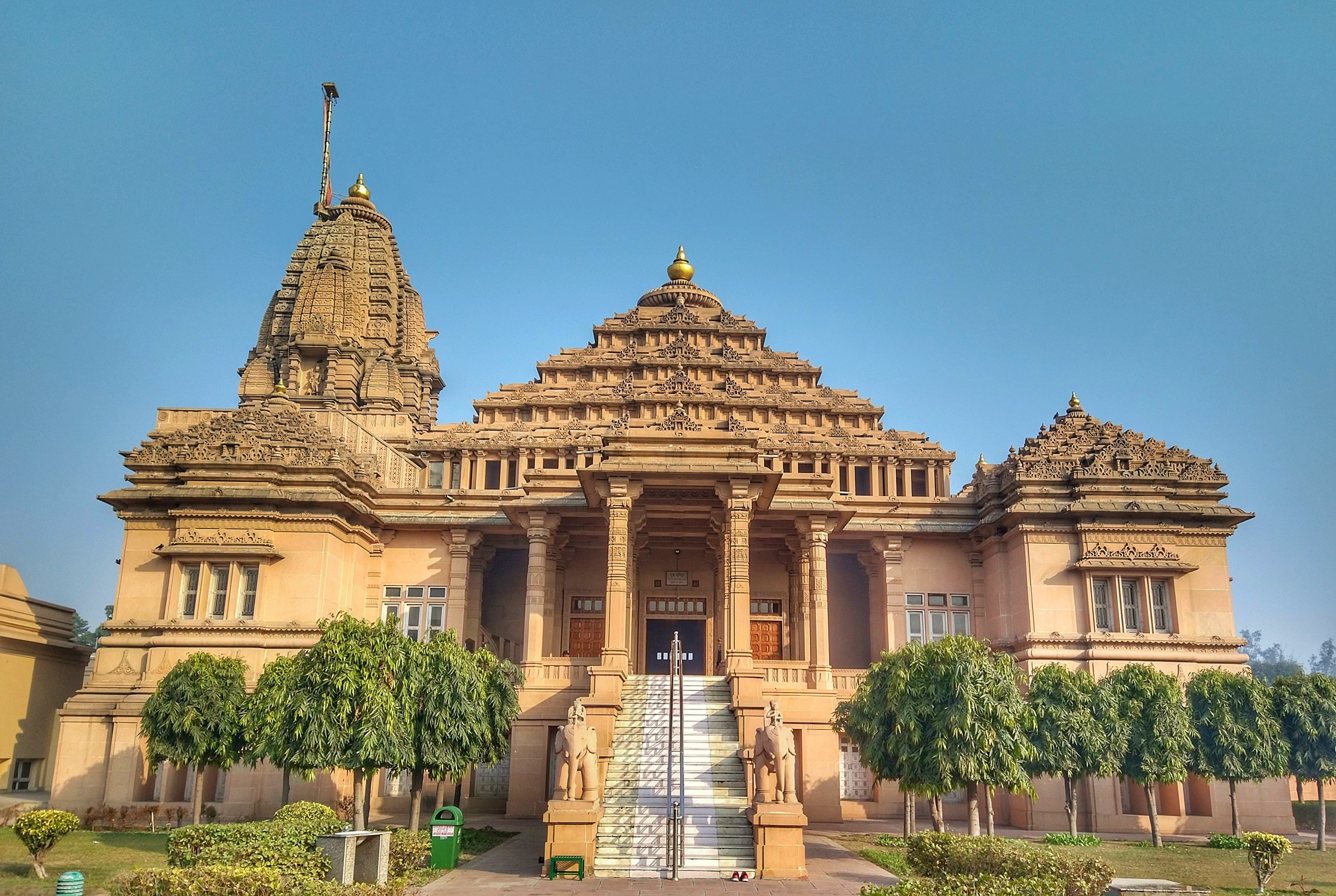
- Vallabh Smarak Jain Mandir Tirth

Religion
- Affiliation: Jainism
- Deity: Vasupujya Swami
- Festivals: Panch Kalyanaka, Kshmapana Diwas, Parshva - Padmawati Jagran, Nav dhwajarohan (New flag hosting), Birth & Death Anniversary of Acharya Vallabhsuri & Guru Vallabh Bhakti Samaroh
- Governing body: Shree Atma Vallabh Jain Smarak Shikshan Nidhi

Location
- Location: Nangli Poona, GT Karnal road, Delhi
- Interactive map of Shri Atma Vallabh Jain Smarak
- Coordinates: 28°46′38.7″N 77°08′25.9″E

Architecture
- Creator: Acharya Indradinsuri
- Established: 1979
- Completed: 1989
- Temple: 8

Shri Atma Vallabh Jain Smarak also popularly known as Vallabh Smarak Jain Mandir Tirth is a Jain temple and a multi-faceted memorial in the sacred memory of Jain Acharya Shri Vijay Vallabh Surishwer Ji, located on GT Karnal Road, Delhi.

== History ==
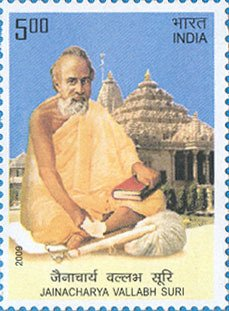
Stamp featuring Shri Vallabhsuri with Shri Atma Vallabh Jain Smarak in background issued in 2009

The Smarak's construction was completed in 1989 by the followers of Acharya Vijay Vallabhsuri, to whom the temple is dedicated as a memorial. Having been solemnized as a Jain saint at a very early age by the illustrious Jain Acharya Shri Vijayanand Surishwer Ji (also known Muni Atmaram Ji), he was one of the most erudite saints of his era. Apart from being a preacher of Lord Mahavira's message of Non-violence, World Peace and Universal brotherhood. Acharya Vallabh Suri was a great reformer, thinker, writer, and educationist who actively supported India's freedom movement and relentlessly worked for the upliftment of the Jain community as well as the masses. His Panchamrut of Sewa (Service), Sangathan (Organisation) Shiksha (Education), Swawlamban (Self-reliance) & Sahitya (Literature) gave a new direction and impetus to the Jain community towards a holistic development. He is known for establishing many Educational Institutions in Punjab, Delhi, Uttar Pradesh, Rajasthan, Gujarat & Maharashtra including Mahavira Jain Vidhyalaya. He also worked to improve the religious and social life of the people in Punjab, earning him the honorific Punjab Kesari. His area of work, however, included Delhi, U.P., Rajasthan, Gujarat, and Maharashtra. His broad and progressive outlook, extraordinary work on moral values-based education for Holistic Development, amelioration of masses, eradication of social evils, and empowerment of women was immensely appreciated during his lifetime and remembered even at present with utmost reverence. He supported the freedom movement and was an active supporter of the Swadeshi movement and the use of Khadi. He was in regular touch with the national stalwarts such as Sardar Patel, Shri Moti Lal Nehru, Pandit Madan Mohan Malviya, Shri Morar Ji Desai, and many others. To him goes the solemn credit for the safe passage of a large number of Jains and others from Gujranwala (now in Pakistan) to India in the peak of violence during September 1947.

Initially, Acharya Samudrasuri led the construction of the Smarak, followed by Acharya Indradinsuri with Mahattaraa Mrigavati being the torchbearer for this project. At present the activities of this Smarak are being carried out under the guidance of Acharya Nityanandsuri - the senior-most Acharya and Gachhadhipati of Acharya Vallabh Suri Samuday. With Acharya Nityanand Suri's inspiration, Guru Vallabh's life has been depicted in very artistic 3D Stone Sculpture work in the Guru Mandir. Besides, Hostel and Bhojanshala for the Scholars and Devotees has been constructed with picturesque landscaping. In July 2021, Vijay Vallabh Pakshi Chikitsalay has been put in operation in which injured and unwell birds are provided treatment. Arrangements have been made to carry injured birds from all over NCR.

As a mark of acknowledgement for his vast services as an erudite and enlightened Jain Saint, the Government of India issued a postage stamp in February 2009 in the honour of Acharya Vallabh Suri.

== Architecture ==
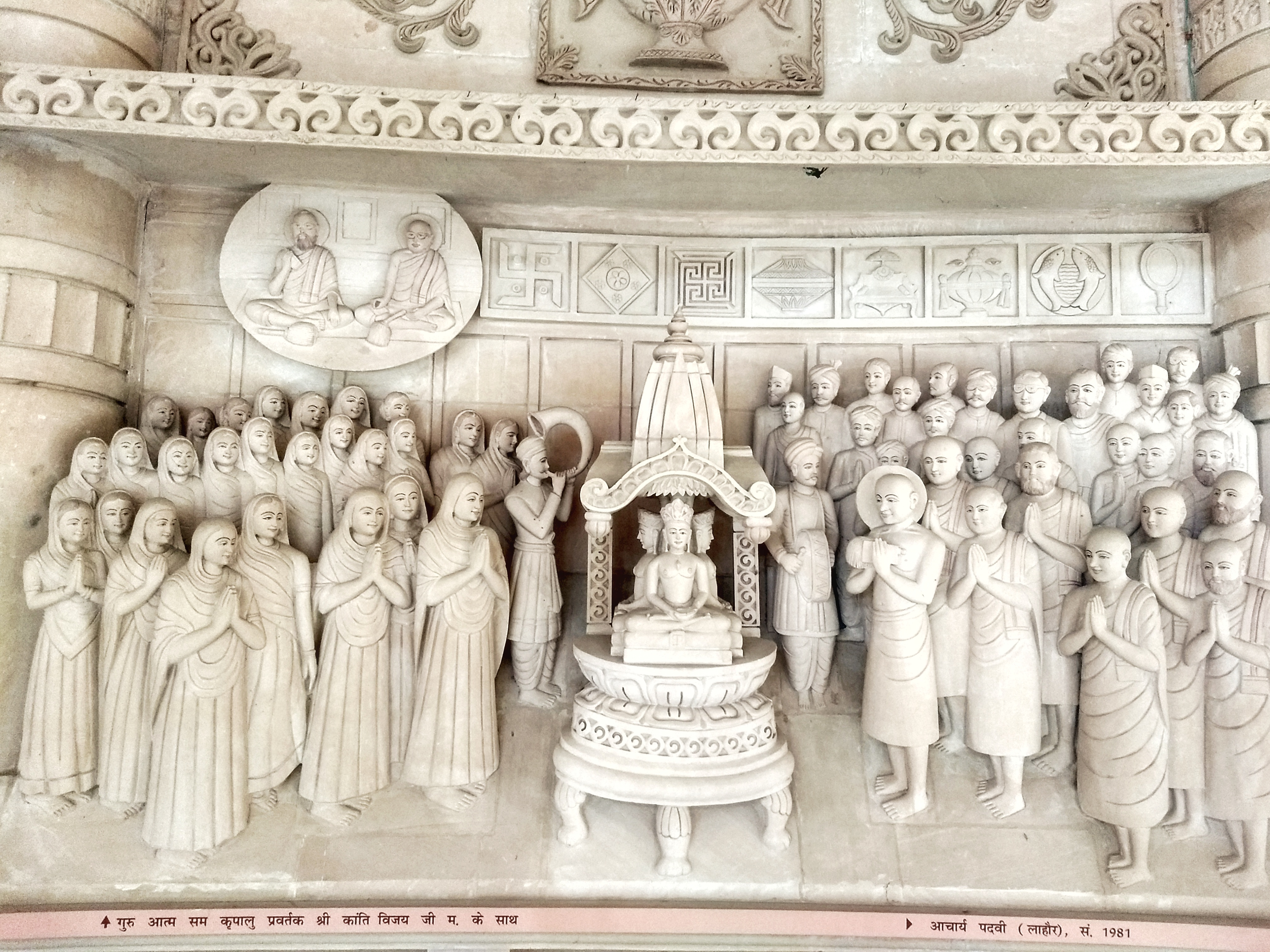
Murals on wall

The main hall of the temple is considered a brilliant example of the structural design as per ancient Jain Sthapatya Kala (Main Sompura: Amrutbhai Mulshankar Trivedi). It is built in dome-shaped internally with stepped roof exterior. The temple belongs to Śvētāmbara sect of Jainism.

The temple itself consists of ancient idols along with the manuscripts, images, sculptures dating back to the medieval period. The mulnayak of the temple is 12th Tirthanker Shree Vasupujya Swami placed along with Tirthanker Shree Munisuvrat Swami, Shree Rishabdev & Shree Parshwnath in a typical Chaumukha formation. Many ancient murals and artefacts are displayed in the basement Museum. Guru Mandir on the ground floor has a stunning sculpted image of Acharya Vallabh Suri and His charan paduka. These images are sourced mainly from Gujarat, Rajasthan and Maharashtra. Besides in the circular hall, of 64 feet width and 84 feet height, there are ten panels of exquisite three-dimensional stonework depicting the illustrious life and ideals of Acharya Vallabhsuri.

== About temple ==
The temple is managed by Shree Atma Vallabh Jain Smarak Shikshan Nidhi. Besides a Jain Temple, Guru Mandir, Samadhi Mandir, Dev - Devi Mandir, there is Jain Bharati Mrigawati Vidyalay, and Bhogilal Lehar Chand Institute of Indology engaged in studies, research on Jainism and other contemporary religions and teaching Prakrit (original language in which Lord Mahavira pronounced sermons). A vast collection of Jain ancient literature, handwritten manuscripts, rare books, memoirs, and literature of Atma - Vallabh samuday brought from Gujranwala and later supplemented from Patan, Kutch & Vadodara make the Library unique. Jain Museum of Art & Culture located just below the Guru Mandir houses some stunning murals, parikars, artefacts, other remnants of the past heritage. The Museum also houses articles personally used by Acharya Vallabh Suri, during his lifetime such as Acharya's clothes, utensils, denture, and inkwell, showcased alongside Jain images and panels. There is a magnificent photo exhibition of Acharya Vallabh Suri in a room just outside the Guru Mandir. The Smarak is also equipped with all necessary infrastructure such as two Upashray Bhawans for the stay of Jain Monks & Nuns separately, Bhojanshala, a hostel for scholars and devotees, an administrative block, etc.

== Gallery ==
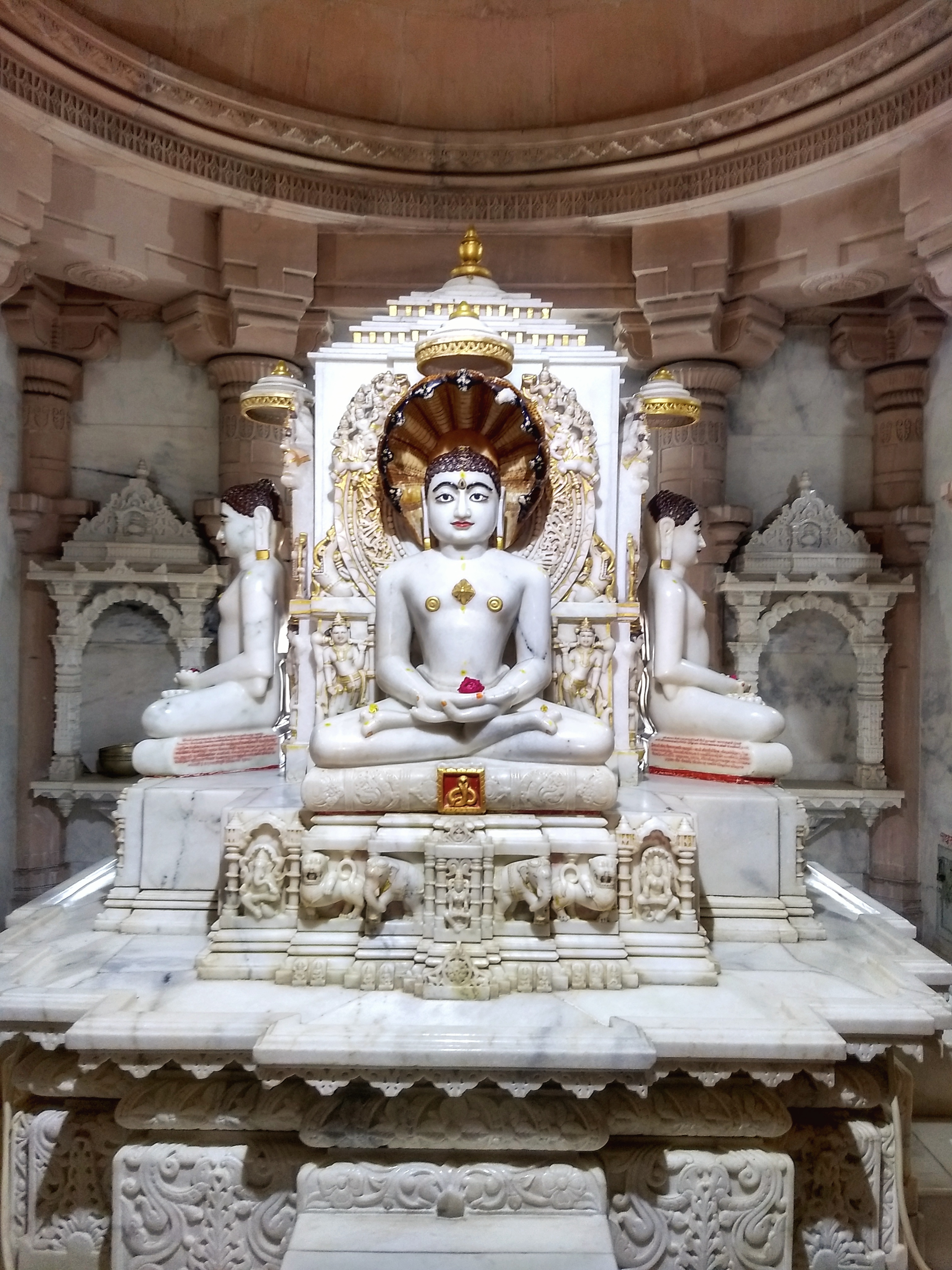
Mulnayak idol

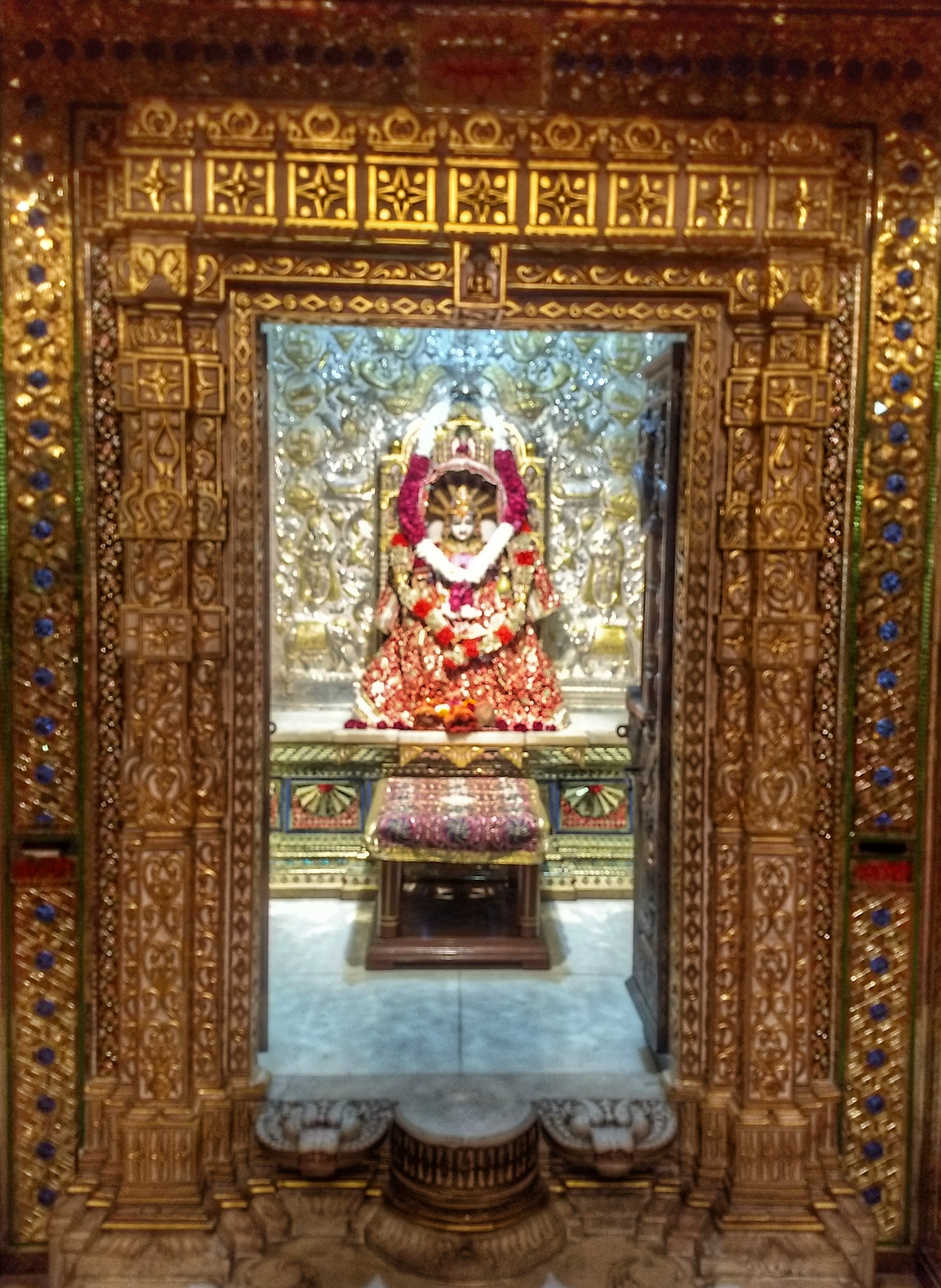
Padmavati Idol

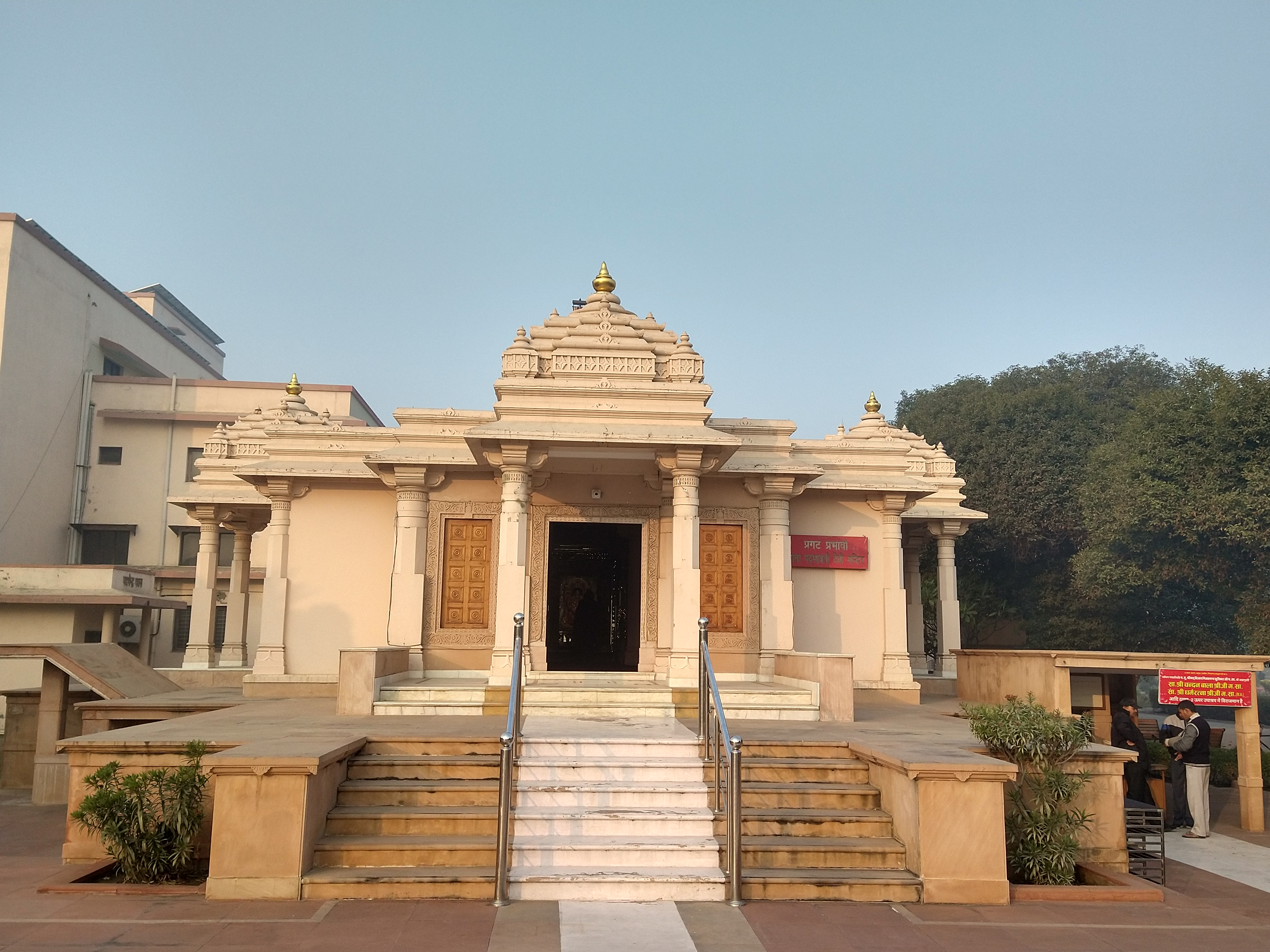
Padmavati temple inside the temple complex

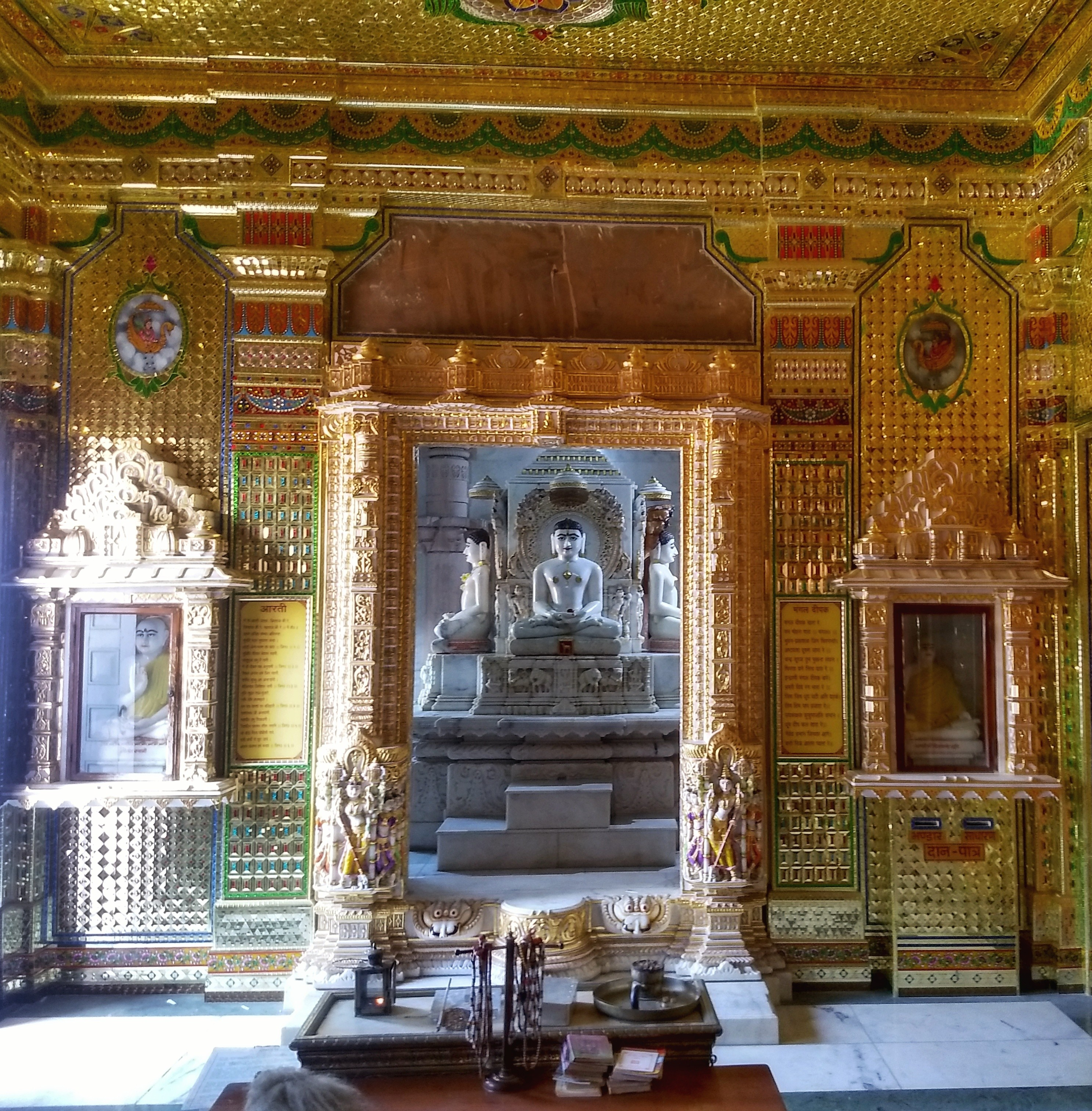
Main vedi

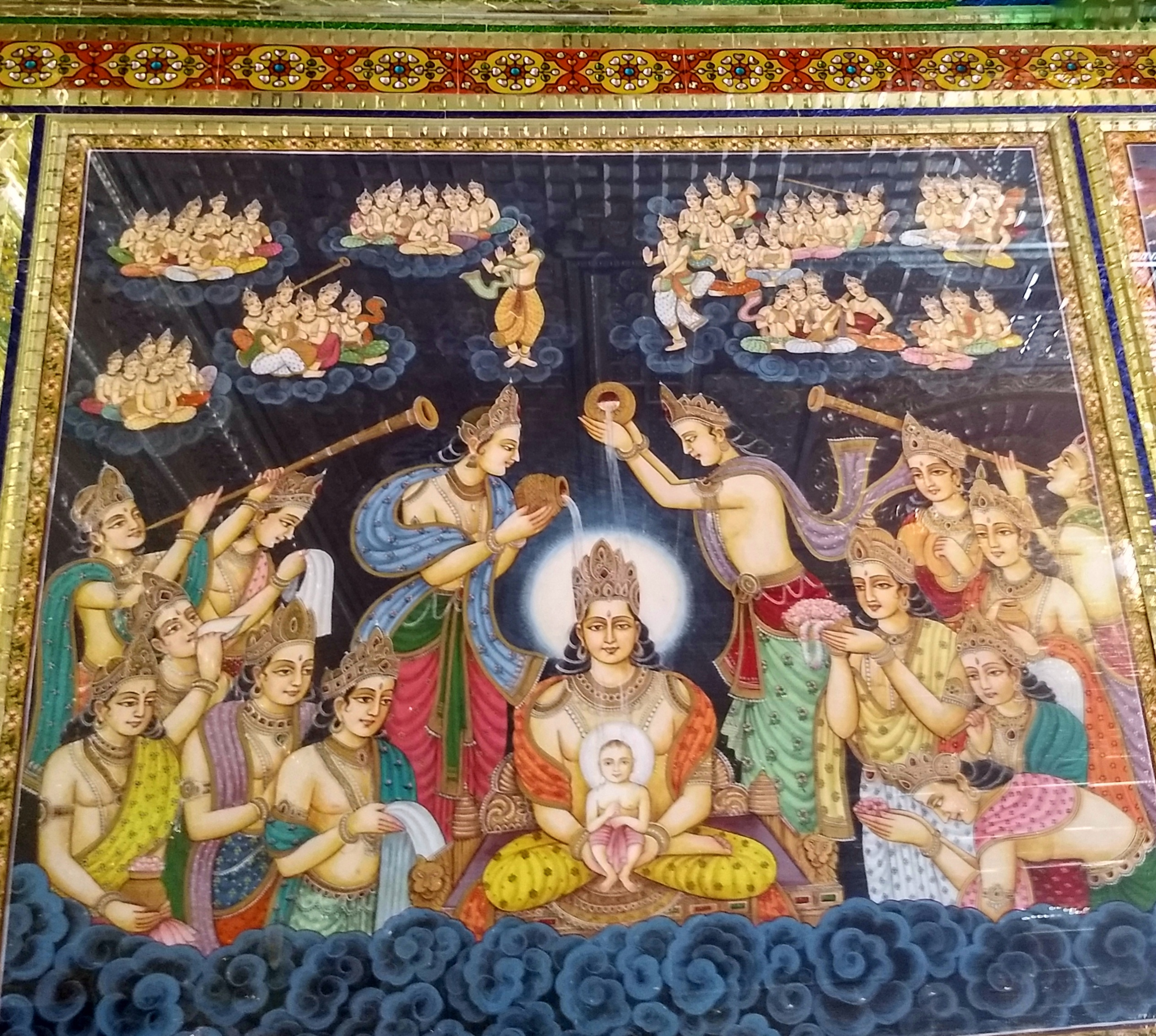
Janma Kalyanak depiction on wall

== See also ==
- Jainism in Delhi
- Lal Mandir
- Dādābadī
