= Jnanarnava =

Information
- Religion: Jainism
- Period: 11th Century CE

Jnanarnava (Sanskrit: ज्ञानार्णव, IAST: Jñānārṇāva, meaning 'Ocean of Wisdom on Meditation') is an important Jain text in Sanskrit on various topics useful to the mendicant but focuses primarily on meditation. Another name for this text is Yogapradipadhikara meaning, the Book that Illuminates Meditation.

== Subject matter ==
Jnanarnava is an important work in Jainism focusing on dhayana (meditation), its techniques and results. But it does not focus only on meditation, but is underpinned by Jain ontology and presents the Jain teachings in the light of Yoga. Subhacandra distinguishes three categories of dhyana—good, evil and pure, in conformity with the three types of purposes, viz., the auspicious, the inauspicious and the transcendental. At another place, he classifies dhyana into prasasta (the psychical or psychological view) and aprasasta (practical or ethical view). In addition to this, he also elaborately expounds the process of dhyana by classifying meditation into pindastha (five forms of contemplation or dharmas), padastha (contemplation by means of certain Mantric syllables), rupastha (meditating on the divine qualities and the extraordinary powers of the Arihants) and rupatita (meditation on the attributes of Siddhatman).

Besides meditation, this books deals extensively on Jain ethics like Ahimsa, Satya etc. One of the most forceful statement on Ahimsa is found in the Jnanarnava: "Violence alone is the gateway to the miserable state, it is also the ocean of sin; it is itself a terrible hell and is surely the densest darkness"; and "If a person is accustomed to committing injury, then all his virtues like selflessness, greatness, desirelessness, penance, liberality, or munificence are worthless" (8.19-20).

== Contents ==
Jnanarnava is a fairly extensive work and has 39 chapters and 2230 verses. The 39 chapters are:

1. Pithika (Background)
2. Dvadasha Bhavana (Twelve Contemplations)
3. Dhyana Lakshana (Characteristics of Meditation)
4. Dhyana Guna-Dosha (Virtues and Faults of Meditation)
5. Yogi Prashamsa (In Praise of the Mendicant)
6. Darshana Vishuddhi (Purity of Perception)
7. Jnanopayoga (Focus of Knowledge)
8. Ahimsa Vrata (Vow of Nonviolence)
9. Satya Vrata (Vow of Truth)
10. Caurya Parihara (Avoiding Stealing)
11. Kama Prakopa (Tumult of Passion)
12. Stri Svarupa (True Nature of Woman)
13. Maithuna (Carnal Enjoyment)
14. Samsarga (Commingling)
15. Vrdda Seva (Serving the Old)
16. Parigrahadosha Vicara (Reflecting on the Faults of Attachment to Wealth)
17. Asha Pishaci (The Demon of Expectation)
18. Aksha Vishaya Nirodha (Suppressing the Pleasures of the Eye)
19. Tritattva (The Three Substances)
20. Mano Vyapara Pratipadana (Conduct of the Mind explained)
21. Ragadi Nivarana (Riddance of Attachment and Aversion)
22. Samya Vaibhava (The Power of Equanimity)
23. Arta Dhyana (Mournful Meditation)
24. Arta-Raudra (Mournful - Wrathful)
25. Dhyanaviruddha Sthana (Places detrimental to Meditation)
26. Pranayama (Control of Breath)
27. Pratyahara (Withdrawing the Senses)
28. Savirya Dhyana (Meditation on Oneness with the Supreme Soul)
29. Shuddhopayoga Vicara (Reflection on the Supreme Meditation)
30. Ajna Vicaya (Meditation on the Jinas' teachings)
31. Apaya Vicaya (Meditation on the Destruction of karmas)
32. Vipaka Vicaya (Meditation on the Fruition of karmas)
33. Samsthana Vicaya (Meditation on the Structure of the Universe)
34. Pindastha Dhyana (Meditation on Concrete Objects)
35. Padastha Dhyana (Meditation on Words)
36. Rupastha Dhyana (Meditation on the Jinas)
37. Rupatita Dhyana (Meditation on the Self)
38. Dharma Dhyana Phala (Fruits of Righteous Meditation)
39. Shukla Dhyana Phala (Fruits of Meditation of the Pure Self)

== Authorship and dating ==
Acarya Shubhacandra does not mention his name anywhere in this exhaustive work on meditation. However, the influence of earlier luminaries like Jinabhadra Gani Kshamashramana, Acarya Pujyapada, Acarya Akalanka, Acarya Jinasena, Acarya Amrtacandra, Acarya Somadeva and Acarya Amitagati is clear in this work. In turn, he has influenced the work of Acarya Prabhacandra and Acarya Hemacandra. He may be dated as having lived in the 11th century CE. Shubhacandra was a guru to Gangaraja, general and prime minister to King Bittideva under whose guidance he undertook many acts of piety and religion to advance the cause of Jainism.

The Jain religion places a great deal of emphasis on purity of conduct and the ability of the soul to attain liberation through the highest level of meditation. However, there are not that many books on meditation written by the Jains. This automatically places this text in an exclusive category, along with Jinabhadra Gani's Dhyanashataka, Pujyapada's Samadhitantra, Haribhadra's Yogabindu and Yogadrshtisamuccaya, Jinasena's Adipurana, Amitagati's Yogasara Prabhrta and Shravakacara, Gunabhadra's Atmanushasana and Hemacandra's Yogashastra. There is an uncanny resemblance between this text and Hemacandra's ‘Yogashastra’. Clearly, one has influenced the other. Since Shubhacandra precedes Hemacandra, it is likely that Hemacandra is influenced by Shubhacandra.

== Commentaries ==
Following is a partial list of commentaries on Jnanarnava:

1. Acarya Vidyanandin (1470) – Commentary on Shubhacandra's Jnanarnava
2. Shrutasagara Suri (1500) – Tattvatrayaprakashini on Shubhacandra's Jnanarnava
3. Pandit Nayavilasa (1650) – Commentary on Shubhacandra's Jnanarnava
4. Yasovijaya (1680) – Commentary on Jnanarnava

== See also ==
- Jain Agamas
- Jainism

== Bibliography ==
- Śubhacandra. Jñānārṇava, ed. H. L. Jain, Kailashchandra Siddhantacharya and A. N. Upadhye, Sholapur, 1977.
