= Prem Suri =

Indian monk and religious scholar (1884–1968)

Acharya Prem Suri

Personal life
- Born: Prem Chand; 1884 Pindwara, Rajasthan, India
- Died: 22 May 1968 (aged 83–84) Khambat, Gujarat, India

Religious life
- Religion: Jainism
- Sect: Śvetāmbara Murtipujaka

Prem Suri (1884 – 22 May 1968), né Prem Chand, was an Indian ascetic and philosopher of the Śvetāmbara sect of Jainism. He belonged to the Tapa Gaccha sub-sect of the religion.

Suri was born in 1884 in the village of Nandia in the Sirohi district in Rajasthan. In 1901, at the age of 17, he was initiated as a Jain monk by Dan Vijay Suri.

He was a prolific writer, having written such philosophical works on Jainism as Sankram Karanam and Karmasiddhi. In 1966 he published Khavagasedhi and Thiaibandho, each containing more than twenty thousand verses.

He died on 22 May 1968 at Khambhat, Gujarat. After his death, his tradition was divided into two schools, led by Ramachandra Suri and Bhuvanbhanusuri respectively.
