= Irla =

- neighbourhood
- Location within Mumbai
- Coordinates: 19°06′29″N 72°50′17″E
- Country: India
- State: Maharashtra
- City: Mumbai (MCGM)
- District: Mumbai Suburban
- Zone: 3
- Ward: K-West
- Elevation: 9 m (30 ft)
- Time zone: UTC+5:30 (IST)
- PIN: 400056
- Parliamentary constituency: Mumbai North Central
- Assembly constituency: Vile Parle

Irla is a neighborhood in suburban Mumbai, part of Vile Parle. It is located near the upmarket Juhu area.

There is a Jain temple of the first Tirthankar of Jains, Adinath.

It also contains a famous chain of shops called "Alfa". Also Located in Irla is the very famous homeopathic college, Smt. Chandaben Mohanbhai Patel Homeopathic Medical College.

Irla is also home to one of Mumbai's popular Catholic shrines, Our Lady of Velankanni Church.
