= Yashovijaya =

Jain monk (1624–1688)

Mahopadhya Yashovijaya Ji Maharaja
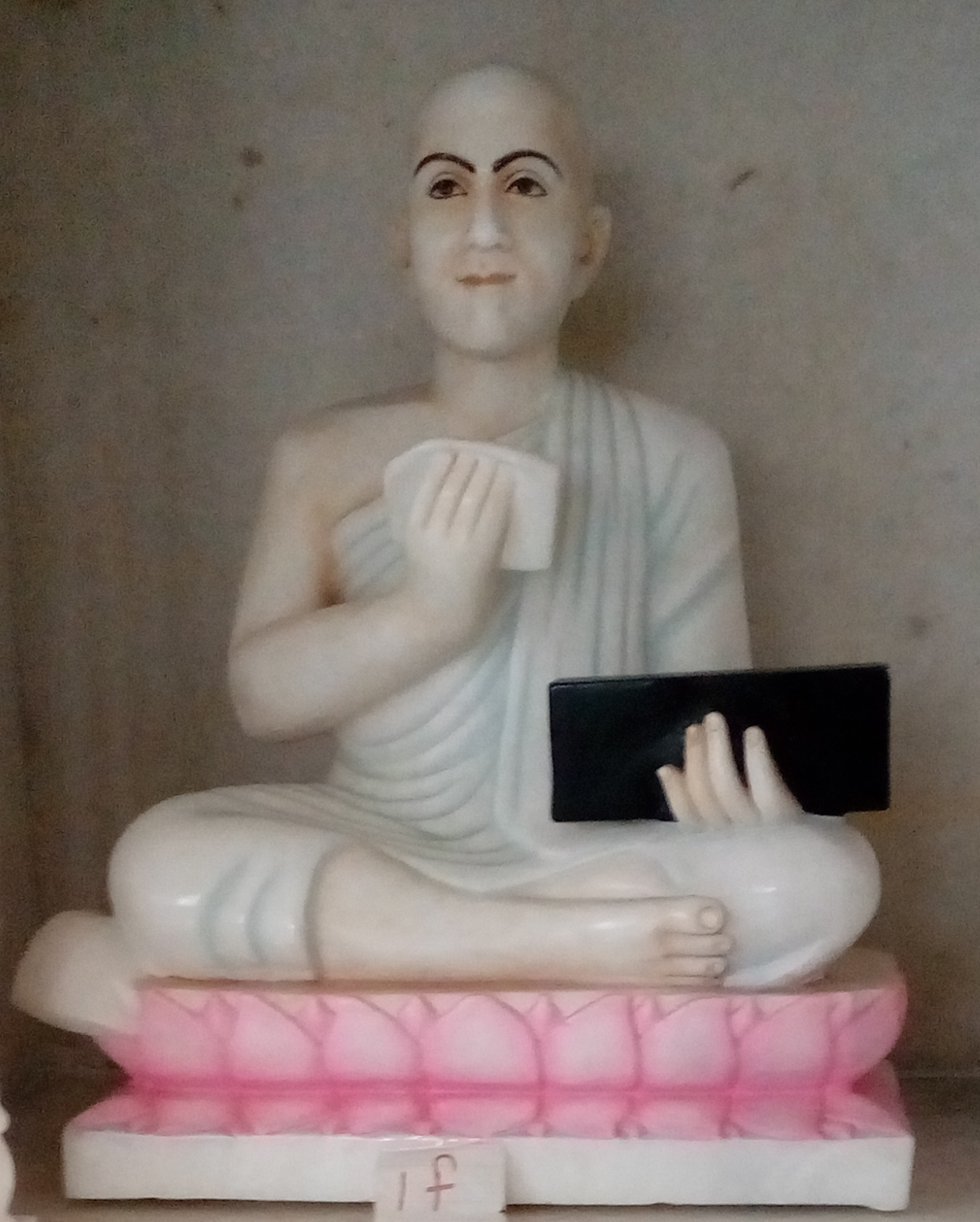
- Idol in library of Lodhadham near Mumbai, Maharashtra.

Personal life
- Born: 1624
- Died: 1688 (aged 63–64)

Religious life
- Religion: Jainism
- Sect: Śvetāmbara

Yashovijaya (IAST: Yaśovijaya, 1624–1688), a seventeenth-century Jain philosopher-monk, was an Indian philosopher and logician. He was a thinker, prolific writer and commentator who had a strong and lasting influence on Jainism. He was a disciple of Muni Nayavijaya in the lineage of Jain monk Hiravijaya (belonging to the Tapa Gaccha tradition of Śvetāmbara Jains) who influenced the Mughal Emperor Akbar to give up eating meat. He is also known as Yashovijayji with honorifics like Mahopadhyaya or Upadhyaya or Gani.

== Early life ==
Yashovijaya was born in a village called Kanoda in the Mehsana district in Gujarat in 1624 CE. Some sources place his year of birth as 1608 CE. His childhood name was Jasha. He belonged to the endogamous group of Oswal Jains. He lost his father when he was very young and consequently he was brought up by his mother. The inclination towards religious life was inculcated by his mother, who often used to take him to Jain upashrayas. Young Yashovijaya attracted attention of Jain monk Nayavijayaji, a monk in lineage of Acharya Jagatchandrasuri, who was impressed by his impressive memory feat of remembering the Bhaktamara Stotra at a very young age.

== Life as a monk ==
He was initiated as a young monk under the stewardship of Muni Nayavijaya. According to some sources, he came to Varanasi in the company of his teacher Nayavijaya, to get into the matha. By some accounts, he was sent by his guru to Varanasi to study logic and philosophy along with another disciple Vinayvijaya. Other sources indicate, he had gone to Varanasi on his own in 1626. By around 1638 he confessed that he was a Jain monk and was at once asked to leave the matha. But the sources are unanimous that for around 12 years he studied Sanskrit, Prakrit, logic and Metaphysics. He became skilled in the field of Navya-Nyāya branch of logic and thus earned the titles Upajjhaya (teacher), Nyayavisharada (one who is skilled in logic) and Nyayacarya (authority on logic).

According to Jonardon Ganeri, Yashovijaya's intellectual biography can be seen as falling under three heads: an apprenticeship in Varanasi studying Navyanyaya, a period writing Jaina philosophical treatises using the techniques and methods of Navyanyaya, and a time spent writing works with a markedly spiritual and religious orientation. One of the decisive events in the process leading to this transformation was Yashovijaya's meeting with Anandghan, a Jain spiritual poet and monk.

He was a prolific writer and is said to have authored around 100 works in Sanskrit and Gujarati. After a career as a monk, philosopher, author, poet and logician, for almost 80 years, he died at Dabhoi, Gujarat in 1688 CE.

== Philosophy ==
Paul Dundas calls Yashovijaya as the last truly great intellectual figure in Jainism, who rose to fame on account of his learning and mastery of sophisticated logical techniques as well for his interest of mysticism in later life. Yashovijaya often refers to the 8th Century Jain scholar-monk Acarya Haribhadra in his works, indicating that he saw himself as Haribhadra's successor. Haribhadra's reputation for being influenced only by the logical cogency of the doctrines and viewpoints (anekantavada) ultimately shaped Yashovijayas irenic but sometimes critical attitude towards other sects and traditions. Yashovijaya had not only studied all the great Śvetāmbara authors from the oldest to the latest, he was also well read in important Digambara works. He wrote several important Navyanyaya works on Digambara Nyaya texts such as the Aptamimamsa of Acarya Samantabhadra. The Jain tradition is remarkably ecumenical when it comes to Nyaya and Acaryas of both the Digambara and the Śvetāmbara traditions have composed texts in the genre of Nyaya and the texts are read by monks and scholars of both traditions. Furthermore, Yashovijaya he was well versed in philosophy of diverse schools such as Vedantic, Sankhya, Yoga, Mimāṃsā and Buddhist.

=== Secular intellect and tolerance ===
In his famous work, Adhyatmopanisatprakarana he argued that no body of ‘theory’ (sastra), whether Jain or non-Jain, is to be accepted merely on the basis of sectarian interest. Instead, the theory should be subject to testing, just as the purity of a sample of gold is determined by tests involving rubbing, cutting and heating (1.17) In one of the ethical works, the Jnanasara, Yashovijaya describes 32 moral and intellectual virtues that constitute a virtuous character. Out of these, two are distinctive: neutrality (madhyasthata) and groundedness in all view-points (sarvanayasraya). Neutrality is explained in terms of the dispassionate use of reason: a person who embodies this virtue follows wherever reason leads, rather than using reason only to defend prior opinions (16.2). Yashovijaya stresses that neutrality is not an end in itself, but a means to another end. We adopt a neutral attitude, he says, in the hope it leads to well-being (hita), just as someone who knows that one among a group of herbs is restorative but does not know which one it is, acts reasonably if they swallow the entire lot (16.8).

=== Conception of self ===
Yashovijaya authored two famous texts — Adhyatmasara and Adhyatmopanisatprakarana— that analyses the true nature of self. Yashovijaya describes the state of true self-awareness as a state beyond deep sleep, beyond conceptualisation, and beyond linguistic representation, and he says that it is the duty of any good sastra to point out the existence and possibility of such states of true self-awareness, for they cannot be discovered by reason or experience alone. Yashovijaya argues that from the standpoint of niscaya naya (real standpoint) the soul is called jiva if it leads an embodied life. This is different from Kundakunda’s view of niscaya naya, that only a soul that possesses the most essential property of the soul—cognitive capacity—is jiva. This means that according to Kundakunda only a released soul is jiva from the standpoint of niscaya naya. While both position have valid logic, Yashovijaya criticised this view as it had no support from any prior authors. This is discussed in his work Gyānsār.

=== Intellectual critic and criticisms ===
Yashovijaya stressed that neutrality does not mean acceptance of every position whatever, but acceptance only of those that satisfy at least the minimal criteria of clarity and coherence needed to legitimately constitute a point of view. Hence he criticised the Carvaka philosophy as being too confused in their understanding of the topic of liberation even to be said to have a ‘view’. He also confronted the Brahmin scholar Raghunatha Siromani, one of the greatest exponent of modern logic during his time, thus proving his extraordinary talent. Paul Dundas notes that, Yashovijaya also criticized the famous Digambara Jain monk Kundakunda for his more reliance on one standpoint. He also strongly attacked the laity based Adhyatmika sect whose de-emphasis on the role of rituals and ascetics was derived from works of Kundakunda and his commentators. At the same time, Yashovijaya also opposed the views of Śvetāmbara monk Dharmasagara for his supremacist perspective of Jainism and exclusivist refusal to accept validity of any religious path except that of Tapa Gachchha (a sub-sect of Śvetāmbara Jains).

Despite his eminence and influence, one criticism leveled against Yashovijaya is that he is best known for his Navya-Nyaya commentaries of earlier existing works rather than his own original works. Furthermore, his works on Yoga, dhyana, grammar and poetry did not gain much fame, as the works of Haribhadra and Hemacandra on these topics were already established and famous by the time Yashovijaya came on the scene. His fame largely rests on his mastery of navyanyaya, for which he had no contemporary rival. This could be because, for almost six centuries between Hemacandra and Yashovijaya, Jainism did not produce any able scholar on philosophy of nyaya.

== Influence and legacy ==
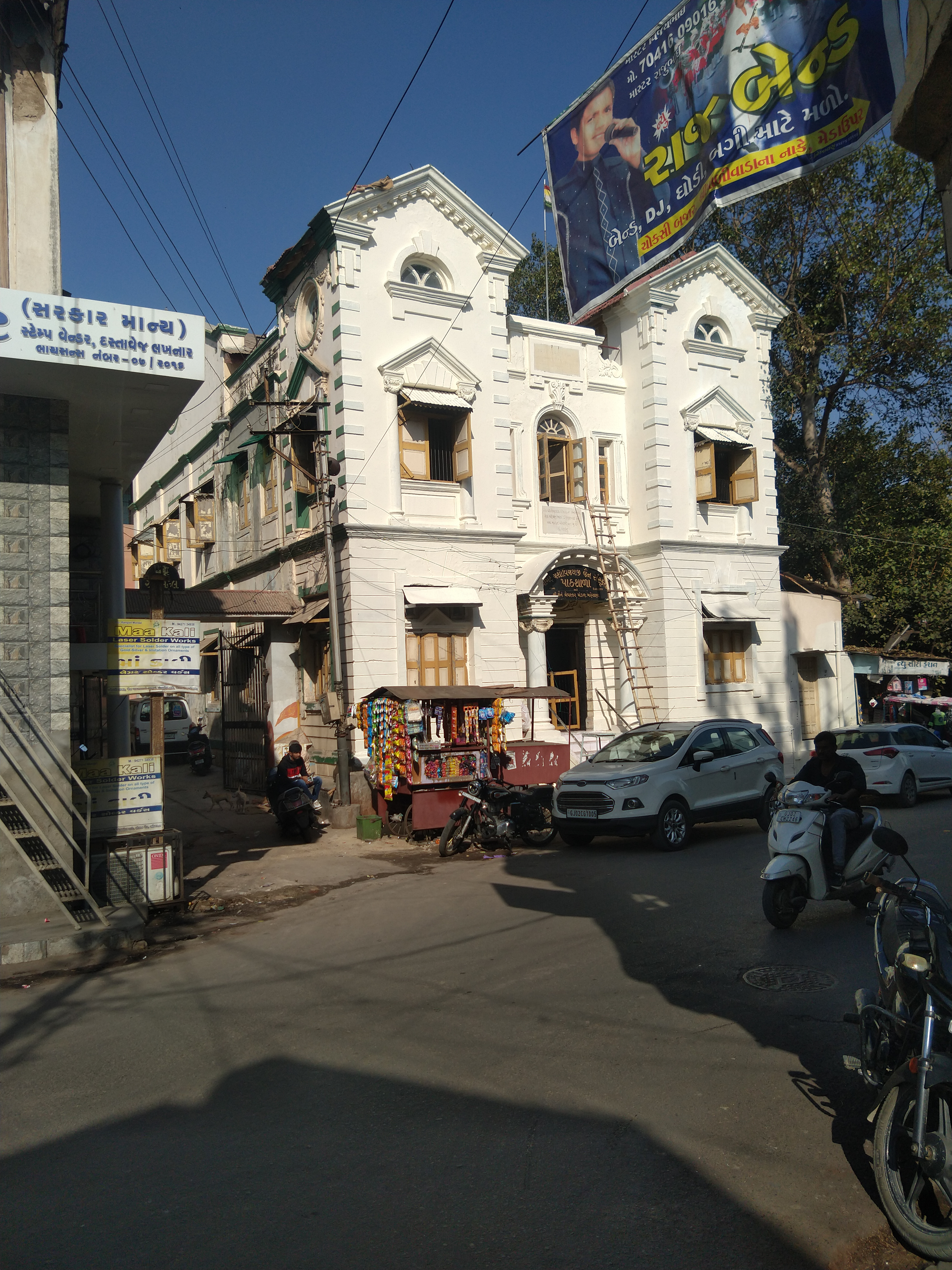
Shrimad Yashovijayji Jain Sanskrit Pathshala in Mehsana

Yashovijaya left behind a vast body of literature that exerted a vast influence on the Jain philosophy. After Acarya Haribhadra and Acarya Hemacandra, Upadhyaya Yashovijaya is the most high-profile Jain monk. Dundas notes that Yashovijaya enjoys a near talismanic figure for the contemporary Śvetāmbara monastic community and is identified with madhyastha or principle of neutrality. Dundas further notes that Yashovijaya paints a superior picture of Jainism with his inclusivism and it is this image of Jainism that has become a dominant one today. A college called Jain Yashovijaya Pathashala has been established in Varanasi in his memory, under auspices of which the sacred Jain texts are being published in a series called Jain Yashovijaya Granthamala. The Jain community of Ahmedabad has honoured him by naming one block as Yashovijaya Chowk at the Relief Road end of Ratanpol where Yashovijaya lived for many years. In Mehsana too, the work of Srimad Yashovijayji Jain Sanskrit Pathshala is particularly praiseworthy. Many students from here have been initiated as Jain saints and several have become Jain religious teachers.

== Works ==
Some of the texts authored by Yashovijaya are:

- Ashtasahasri Tatparyavivarana Tika. Includes original text "Aptamimamsa" by Acarya Samantabhadra; 800 karika commentary on it by Acarya Akalanka called "Ashtashati", 8000 karika commentary on it by Acarya Vidyanandi called "Asthasahasri" and 16000 karika commentary on it by Upadhyaya Yashovijaya, called "Ashtasahasri Taparyavivarana Tika".Edited by Muni Prashamarativijaya. Pune: 2001.
- Adhyatmasara. Edited by Ramanalal C. Shah. Sayala: Sri Raja Sobhaga Satanga Mandala, 1996.
- Adhyatmopanisatprakarana. Edited by Sukhlal Sanghvi. Ahmedabad: Sri Bahadur Singh Jaina Series, 1938.
- Dharmapariksa. Mumbai: Shri Andheri Gujarati Jain Sangha, 1986.
- Jaina Nyayakhandakhadya. Edited by Badarinath Shukla. Varanasi: Chowkhamba Sanskrit Series Office, No. 170, 1966.
- Jaina Tarkabhasa. Edited by Sukhlalji Sanghvi, Mahendra Kumar & Dalsukh Malvania. Ahmedabad: Sri Bahadur Singh Jaina Series, 1938/1942/1997.
- Jnanasara. Edited & Translated by Dayanand Bhargava. Delhi: Motilal Banarsidas, 1973.
- Commentary on Jnanarnava
