= Tapa Gaccha =

Monastic order of Śvetāmbara Jainism

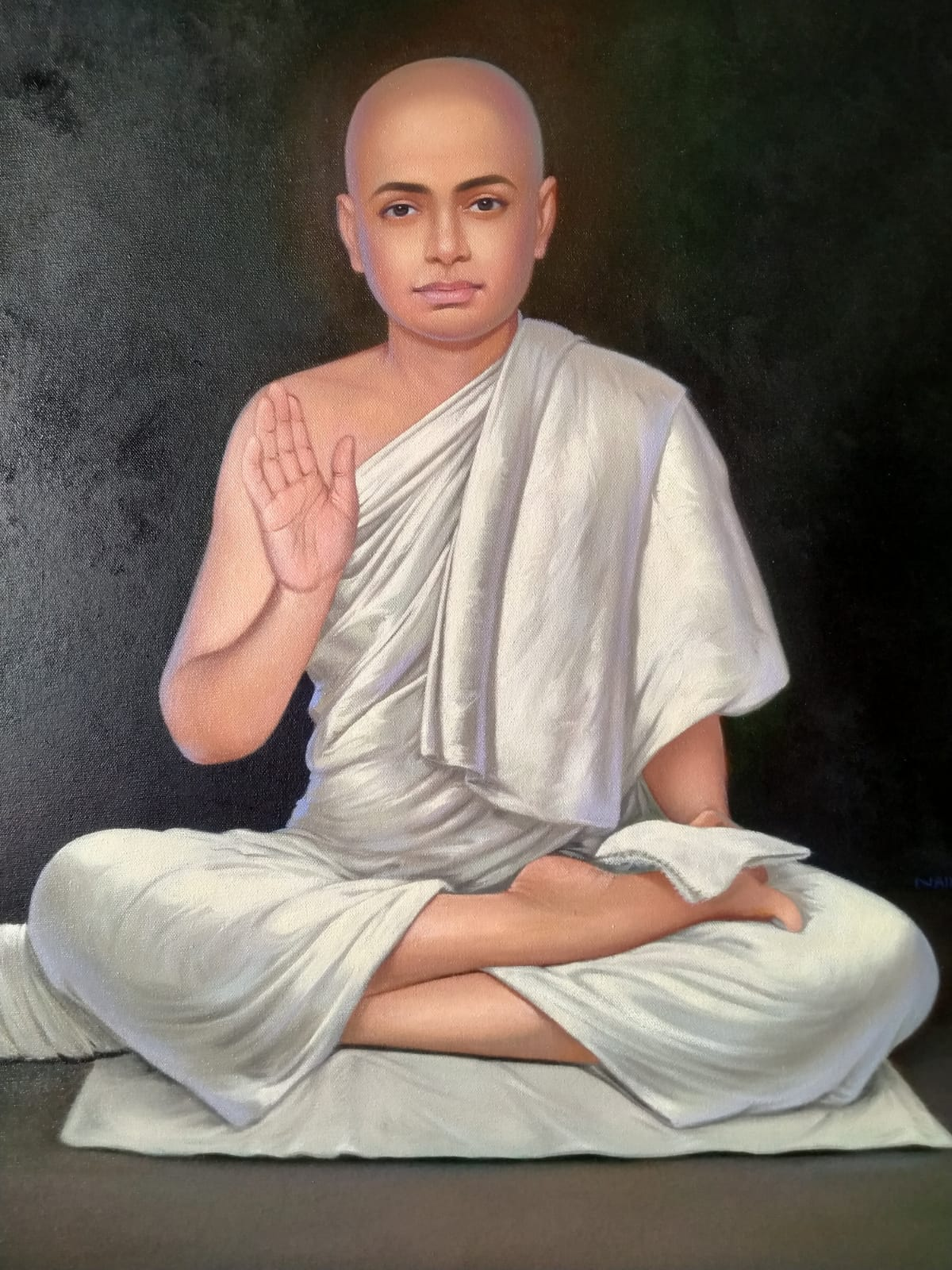
A representative painting of Ācarya Jagatcandrasūri, after whom the subsect was named Tapā Gaccha

Tapa Gaccha is the largest Gaccha (monastic order) of Śvetāmbara Jainism. More than half of the existing Jain ascetics belong to the Tapa Gaccha. Several successful Sanskrit scholars belonged to Tapa Gaccha, including Hiravijaya, Meghavijaya, Yashovijaya, Vijayanandsuri among others. Panyas Bhadrankarvijaya was also a notable monk who came in contact with Acharya Ramchandra Suri before initiation as a monk in Tapa Gaccha.

== History ==
Tapa Gaccha was founded by Acharya Jagatchandra Suri in Vikram Samvat 1285 (1228 AD). He was given the title of "Tapa" (i.e., the meditative one) at Aghatpur (now Udaipur) by the ruler of Mewar, Jaitrasimha. This title was applied to the whole group. Jagatchandra Suri died in Vikram Samvat 1327 and was succeeded by Devendra Suri, Dharamaghosh Suri, Somprabh Suri, Somtilak Suri, and others. These leaders performed many religious activities including pratishta-sangh-yatras.

Idol of three prominent Ācaryas from Tapā Gaccha; Hiravijay Suri (left), Jagatcandrasūri (center) & Vijayanand Suri (right)

Under Vijayanandsuri's leadership and other monks, the Shwetambara Murtipujak Conference was established in 1893 which reformed mendicant as well as lay religious practices. As a result of this reform, most Shwetambara Jain monks today belong to Tapa Gaccha. Today, the majority of its followers live in states such as Gujarat, Maharashtra, Tamil Nadu, West Bengal, Punjab and Rajasthan.

=== Denominations ===
Tapa Gaccha was followed by 21 different samuday, or orders. The sects follow different rituals but they do not have differences about scriptures.

Some of these differences include Tithi (calendar date), veneration of gurus, pilgrimage of Palitana temples during monsoon and Santikaram (a religious text) chanting on Chaturdasi (14th day in each half of month in Jain calendar).

Up until the time of Nemisuri, there was unity in Tapa Gachcha. In 1935, on Samvatsari, the last day of Paryushan, Ramchandra Suri order observed it on a different day. This became a sectarian issue and Tapa Gaccha separated into 'Be Tithi Paksh or 'two date fraction' and 'Ek Tithi Paksh or 'one date fraction'. Anandji Kalyanji Trust, which manages 1200 Jain temples, unsuccessfully attempted several times to resolve the issue.

Other distinguishing factors include the veneration of gurus using Vasakshep (a sandalwood powder used for worship) between these two fractions. Be tithi fraction believes that Guru or Acharya should be venerated by Navangi Guru Poojan, spreading powder on nine points of the body while the Ek tithi fraction believes that it should be spread on one point of the body, the Ekangi Guru Poojan. Both fractions differ on the pilgrimage of Palitana temples on mount Shatrunjay by laypersons during monsoon season.

== See also ==
- Tristutik Gaccha
- Kharatara Gaccha
- Jain schools and branches
