= Gopal =

Gopal may refer to:

- Gopal (caste), a social community of Odisha in India
- Gopal (Krishna), the infant/child form of Lord Krishna
- Gopal Bansa, ancient Kingdom in Nepal
- The Gopalas, an early Gaudiya Vaishnava institution
- Gandhian Organisation for Peace and Liberty (GOPAL), an organization founded by Jayatirtha Dasa
- Gopala (mathematician), medieval Indian mathematician
- Gopala (ruler), founder of the medieval Indian Pala dynasty

== People with the given name ==
- Gopal Swarup Pathak (1896–1982), Vice President of India from 1969 to 1974
- Gopal Ganesh Agarkar (1856–1895), Indian social reformer
- Gopal Balakrishnan (born 1966), American philosopher
- Gopal Baratham (1935–2002), Singaporean author and neurosurgeon
- Gopal Chandra Bhattacharya (1895–1981), Indian entomologist and naturalist
- Gopal Bose (1947–2018), Indian cricketer
- Gopal Gurunath Bewoor (1916–1989), Indian military officer and diplomat
- Gopal Bhar, Medieval Bengali jester
- Gopal Bhargava (born 1952), Indian politician
- Gopal Bhatnagar, Canadian surgeon
- Gopal Chakraborty (born 1936), Indian cricketer
- Gopal Singh Chauhan, Indian politician
- Gopal Chhotray (1916–2003), Indian playwright
- Gopal Singha Dev (fl. 1712–1748), king of the Mallabhum
- Gopal Singha Dev II (fl. 1809–1876), king of the Mallabhum
- Gopal Prasad Dubey (born 1957), Indian dancer
- Gopal Nilkanth Dandekar (1916–1998), Indian Marathi writer
- Gopal Hari Deshmukh (1823–1892), Indian activist, thinker, and social reformer
- Gopal Datt, Indian actor
- Gopal Ghose (1913–1980), Indian painter
- Gopal Krishna Gokhale (1866–1915), Indian politician
- Gopal Gupta (computer scientist), Indian computer scientist
- Gopal Gupta (philosopher), Indian philosopher
- Gopal Gurung (1939–2016), Nepalese journalist, author, politician, and futurist
- Gopal Mukund Huddar (1902–1981), Indian anti-colonial activist and anti-fascist soldier
- Gopal Goyal Kanda (born 1965), Indian businessman and politician
- Gopal Khanna, Indian-American civil servant
- Gopal Swami Khetanchi (born 1958), Indian painter
- Gopal Kirati, Nepalese politician
- Gopal Krishna (astronomer) (born 1947), Indian radio astronomer
- Gopal Krishan (1926–2004), Indian musician
- Gopal Kundu (born 1959), Indian biologist
- Gopal Chandra Lamichhane (born 1974), Nepali film director
- Gopal Mayekar (1934–2021), Indian politician and Marathi writer
- Gopal Meena, Indian politician
- Gopal Mishra (1933–2009), Indian journalist and columnist
- Gopal Shankar Misra (1957–1999), Indian musician and music teacher
- Gopal Mittal (1906–1993), Indian Urdu poet, writer, critic and journalist
- Gopal Krishna Muhuri (died 2001), Bangladeshi academic administrator
- Gopal Krishna Nayak (born 1960), Indian academic
- Gopal Singh Nepali (1911–1963), Indian Hindi poet
- Gopal Dutt Ojha (1932–2022), Indian politician
- Gopal Parajuli, Nepalese writer
- Gopal Parmar, Indian politician
- Gopal Prasad Parajuli (born 1953), Nepali judge
- Gopal Krishna Pillai (born 1949), Indian civil servant
- Gopal Purushottam Phadke (died 2009), Indian sports coach
- Gopal Prasad (born 1945), Indian-American mathematician
- Gopal R, Indian military officer
- Gopal Rai, Indian politician
- Gopal Rai (Nepalese politician) (died 2006), Nepalese politician
- Gopal Rajwani (died 2000) Indian politician and criminal
- Gopal Raju (1928–2008), Indian-American publisher, editor, journalist, businessman, and philanthropist
- Gopal Rath (1945–2016), Indian Odia poet
- Gopal Singh Rawat, Indian bureaucrat
- Gopal Prasad Rimal (1918–1973), Nepalese poet
- Gopal Saini (born 1954), Indian runner
- Gopal Krishna Sarangi, Indian economist
- Gopal Sharma (disambiguation), multiple people
- Gopal Shetty, Indian politician
- Gopal Singh (politician) (1917–1990), Indian politician
- Gopal Narayan Singh, Indian politician
- Gopal Prasad Sinha, Indian neurologist and politician
- Gopal K. Singh (born 1976), Indian Hindi actor
- Gopal Das Shrestha (1930–1998), Nepali journalist
- Gopal Subramanium (born c. 1958), Indian lawyer
- Gopal Kalan Tandel (born 1953), Indian politician
- Gopal Jee Thakur (born 1969), Indian politician
- Gopal Vittal (born 1967), Indian business executive
- Gopal Prasad Vyas (1915–2005), Indian poet
- Gopal Baba Walangkar (c. 1840–1900), Indian social reformer
- Gopal Yonzon (1943–1997), Nepalese singer

== People with the surname ==
- Anand Gopal, American journalist
- Antonio Gopal (born 1947), Seychellois hurdler
- B. Gopal, Indian director
- Balasubramanian Gopal (born 1970), Indian biologist
- Dheerendra Gopal (died 2000), Indian Kannada actor
- E. S. Raja Gopal (1936–2018), Indian physicist
- Geetha Narayanan Gopal (born 1989), Indian chess player
- K. Gopal (INC politician), Indian politician
- K. Gopal (AIADMK politician) (born 1960), Indian politician
- Lalinie Gopal, Surinamese politician
- Nakkeeran Gopal (born 1959), Indian journalist
- Narayan Gopal (1930–1990), Nepalese singer and composer
- P. K. Gopal, Indian social worker
- Priyamvada Gopal (born 1968), Indian-British English language academic
- Saroj Chooramani Gopal (born 1944) Indian physician
- Sarvepalli Gopal (1923–2002), Indian historian
- Ram Gopal (author) (born 1925), Indian writer and historian
- Ram Gopal (dancer) (1912–2003), Indian-British dancer
- Tilakam Gopal (born 1941), Indian volleyball player
- Vin Gopal (born 1985), American politician

== See also ==
- Gopalan (disambiguation)
- Gopalganj (disambiguation)
- Gopalpur (disambiguation)
- GOP (disambiguation)
- Gopi (disambiguation)
- Gopal Das (disambiguation)
- Gopal Krishna (disambiguation)
- Rajagopal, an Indian name
- Gopa (caste), an Indian caste
- Gopalila, Indian puppet theatre
- Gopa Rashtra, ancient Indian kingdom
