= Kingdom of Valabhi =

Kingdom in Western India (475–776)

Kingdom of Valabhi Valabhi Rājya
- 475–776
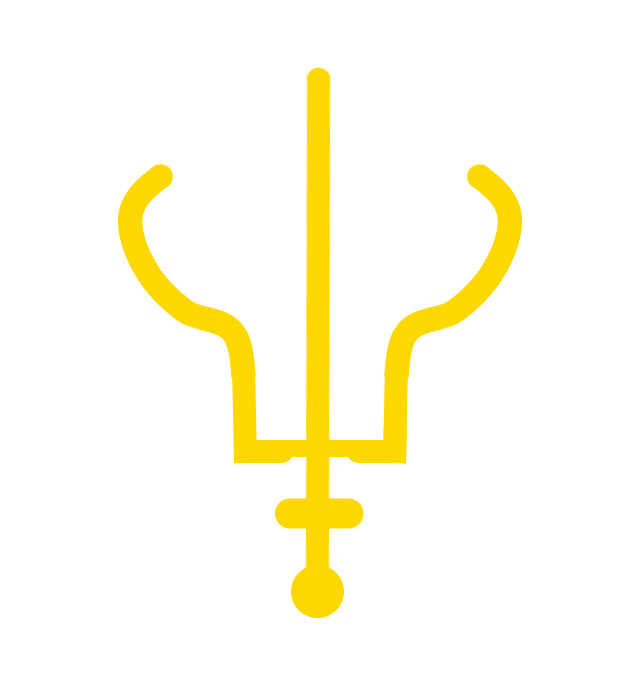
- Valabhi Trident (Note: Insignia used on Coinage)

- Kingdom of Valabhi under Maitrakas (in blue) and their contemporaries in India in 590 AD
- Capital: Vallabhi
- Common languages: Sanskrit; Prakrit; Sauraseni Apabhramsa
- Religion: Hinduism (Shaivism)
- Government: Monarchy
- Maharajadhiraja
  - 475–493: Bhatarka
  - 762–776: Siladitya VI
- History
  - Bhatarka establishes a feudal realm in Valabhi: 475
  - Dronasimha adopts the title of Maharaja (vassal prince): 499
  - Sovereignty: 553
  - Arab invasions: 735
  - Disestablished: 776
| Preceded by | Succeeded by |
| Gupta Empire | Kingdom of Anahilavada; Saindhava dynasty |

The Kingdom of Valabhi was an early medieval kingdom in Western India from 475 to 776. It was founded by Bhatarka, a general in the Gupta Empire, and ruled by the Maitraka dynasty.

Following the decline of the Gupta Empire, Bhaṭārka, the military governor of the Saurashtra region, founded the Maitraka dynasty in 475. He was followed by his son Dharasena I, who also used the title of senapati (commander). His son, Droṇasiṁha proclaimed himself Maharaja. Guhasena (r. 556–570) stopped recognising the suzerainty of the emperor of Magadha and his son, Dharasena II started using the sovereign title of Maharajadhiraja.

The kingdom came under the suzerainty of the Kingdom of Kannauj during the reign of Harsha following which the kingdom became independent again after his death in 647. The kingdom collapsed in 776 after prolonged Arab invasions.

== History ==
=== Bhaṭārka ===
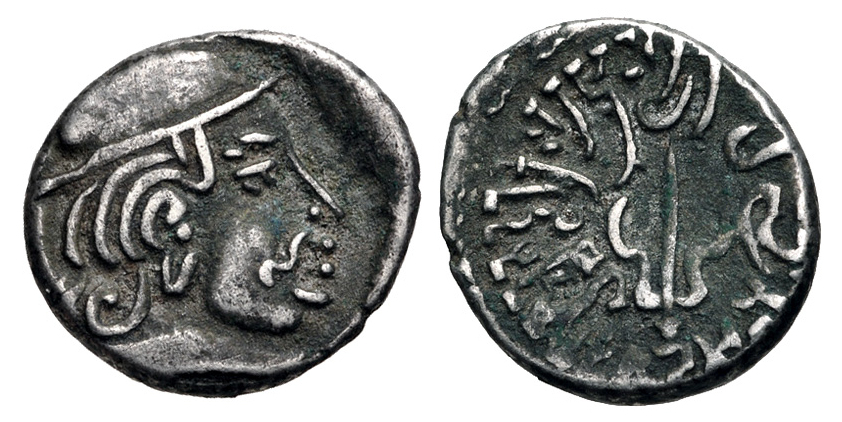
Silver Drachm of Bhaṭārka (Maitrakas of Valabhi). Obverse: Head of the kings facing right. Reverse: Trishula trident (symbol of Shiva) with legend in the Brahmi script: Rájño Mahákshatrapasa Bhatárakasa Mahesara–Śrí Bhaṭṭárakasa "Of the illustrious, the Shaivaite, Bhattaraka, the great king; the great Kshtrapa; the Lord and devotee of Maheshwara."

The Senapati (general) Bhaṭārka, was a military governor of Saurashtra peninsula under the Gupta Empire, who had established himself as the independent ruler of Gujarat approximately in the last quarter of 5th century when the Gupta empire weakened. He continued to use the title of Senapati (general). Apart from his military accomplishments, not much is known from the copper-plates. He was Śaiva according to the title Parama-Maheshwara used for him in grants by his descendants. It seems that he transferred the capital from Girinagar (Girnar) to Vallabhi. The legends of all Valabhi coins are marked with Sri-Bhaṭārka. Almost all the Maitraka inscriptions start with his name. He is known only from the copperplate inscriptions of descendants.

=== Dharasena I ===
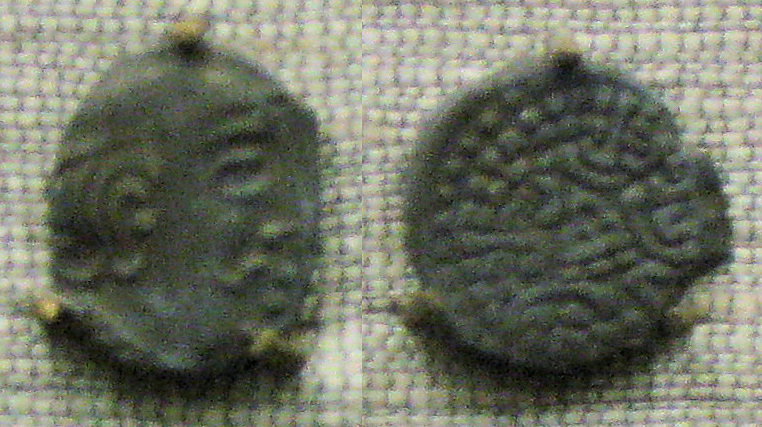
Silver Drachm of Dharasena (Maitraka, 570–606 CE, Gujarat), on the model of the Western Satraps. National Museum, New Delhi.

Bhaṭārka was succeeded by his eldest son Dharasena I who also used only the title of Senapati (general). He reigned approximately from 174 to 180 Valabhi Era (VE) (c. 493–499 CE). It seems that he further consolidated power in weakening Gupta Empire. the Maitrkas had a marriage alliance with Harisena, the King of Avanti who had himself captured many regions formerly under Magadha. Chandralekha, who is described in Dharasanasara of Devasena as the daughter of the king of Ujjayani and the queen of Dhruvasena I.

=== Droṇasiṁha ===
Droṇasiṁha (c. 499 - c. 519 CE), a younger brother of Dharasena I, declared himself as Maharaja known from his copperplate dated 183 VE (502 CE). It is known that his coronation was attended by some higher authority, probably Ujjain as they had a marriage alliance.

Eran pillar inscription of Bhanugupta

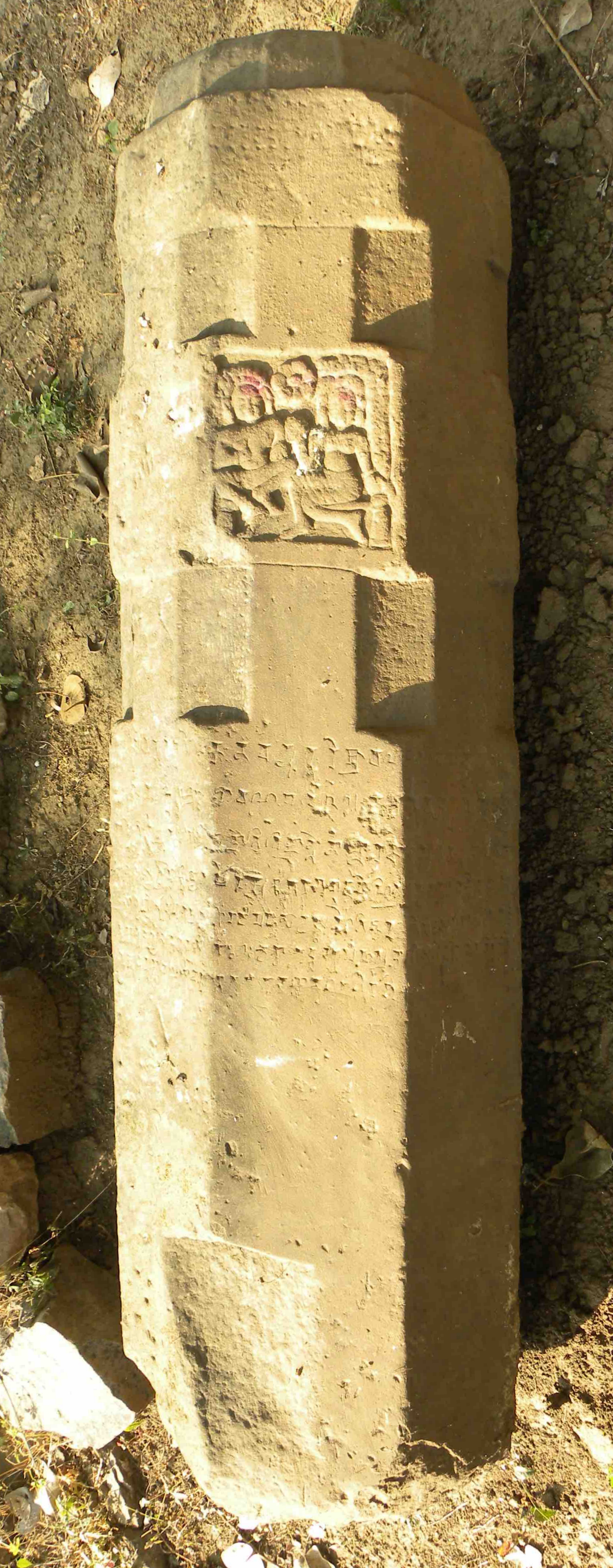
Eran pillar

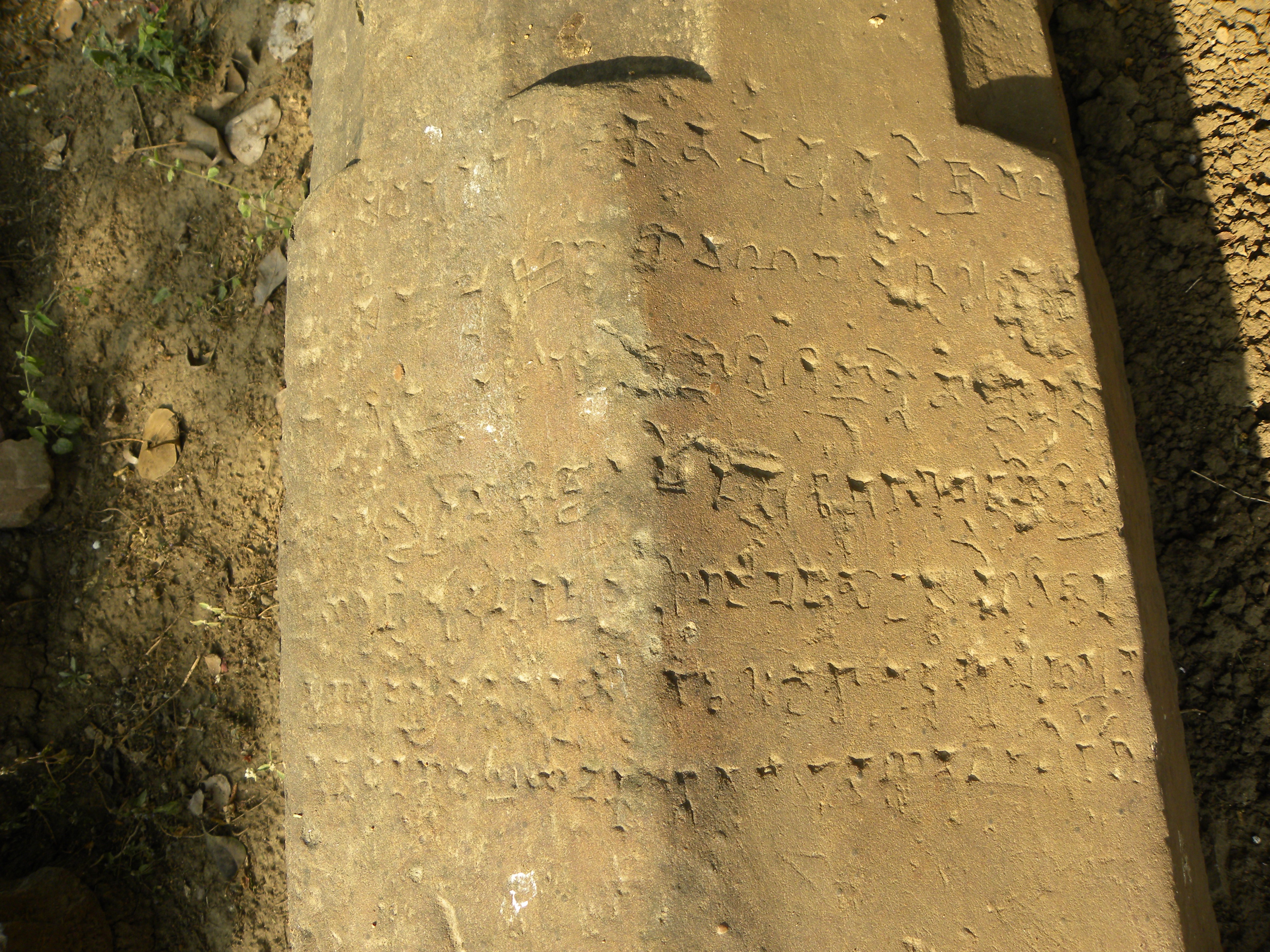
Eran stone pillar inscription.

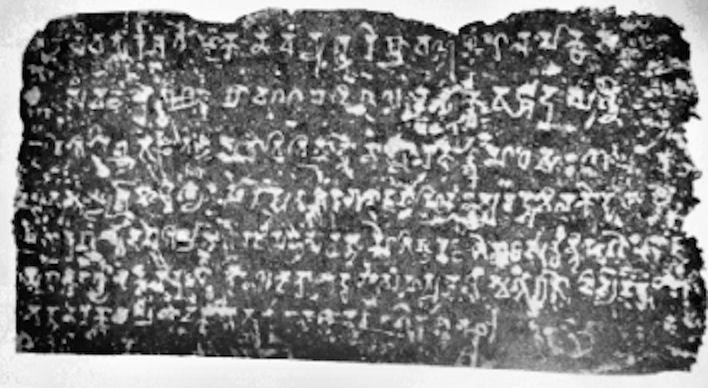
Rubbing of the inscription.

The Eran stone pillar inscription of Bhanugupta mentions a "very big and famous battle" between the Guptas and the Maitrakas.

According to the Eran inscription of Gupta Empire ruler Bhanugupta (new revised translation published in 1981), Bhanugupta and his chieftain or noble Goparaja participated in a battle against the "Maittras" in 510 CE, thought to be the Maitrakas (the reading being without full certainty, but "as good as certain" according to the authors). This would directly allude to the conflict between Valabhi and the Gupta Empire during the reign of Droṇasiṁha. The inscription reads:

- (Verses 3-4) (There is) the glorious Bhanugupta, a distinguished hero on earth, a mighty ruler, brave being equal to Partha. And along with him Goparaja, following (him) without fear, having overtaken the Maittras and having fought a very big and famous battle, went to heaven, becoming equal to Indra, the best of the gods; and (his) devoted, attached, beloved, and beauteous wife, clinging (to him), entered into the mass of fire (funeral pyre).

— Eran inscription of Bhanugupta, 510 CE.

It is also around this time, or soon after, that the Alchon Huns king Toramana invaded Malwa, leading to his mention as "ruler of the earth" in the Eran boar inscription of Toramana.

=== Dhruvasena I ===
Dhruvasena I was the third son of Bhaṭārka and the younger brother of Droṇasiṁha. He reigned c. 519 - c. 549 CE. During his rule, Yashodharman of the Kingdom of Malwa had defeated Harisena of the Ujjain, as well as the Huna king Mihirakula (in 528 CE). Dhruvasena probably had to acknowledge to overlord-ship of Yashodharman. It is known that they had regained their glory as Yashodharman's rule was short lived and was supplanted by the Guptas.

In these grants, Dhruvasena's father Bhaṭárka and his elder brothers are described as 'great Máheśvaras' that are followers of Śiva, while Dhruvasena himself is called 'Paramabhágavata', the great Vaiṣṇava. He must be liberal in religious beliefs. In the 535 CE grant, he had made an arrangement for a Buddhist monastery at Valabhi built by his Buddhist niece Duḍḍá (or Lulá?). He had made several grants to Brahmanas of Vadnagar. The Jain council at Vallabhi was probably held during his rule which was arranged by his wife Chandralekha. During these days, he had lost his son as the Vallabhi council has condoled on loss. Kalpa Sutra, the Jain text, was compiled probably during the reign of Dhruvasena, 980 or 993 years after the death (Nirvana) of Mahavira. Kalpa Sutra mentions that the public reading of it started at Anandapura (Vadnagar) to relieve Dhruvasena from the grief of the death of his son. Based on his grants, it known that his kingdom extended from Dwarika to Valabhi, whole Saurashtra peninsula and as far as Vadnagar in the north.

During his rule, the Garulakas or Garudakas had accepted the Kingdom of Valabhi as their overlord. The Garulaka had captured Dwarika probably with help of Valabhi. They probably has an emblem of the Garuda and it his clear from their grants that they were Vaishnavas. They had made grants to Brahmanas and Buddhists alike.

=== Dharapaṭṭa ===
Dhruvasena I was succeeded by his younger brother Dharapaṭṭa who reigned for a very short period, c. 549 to c. 553. He must be old when he ascended to the throne as his elder brothers ruled before him and thus his reign may have been short. He is the only ruler described as Paramaditya-Bhakta, the devotee of the sun god. He is known by the copperplate grants of his grandson.

From

=== Guhasena ===
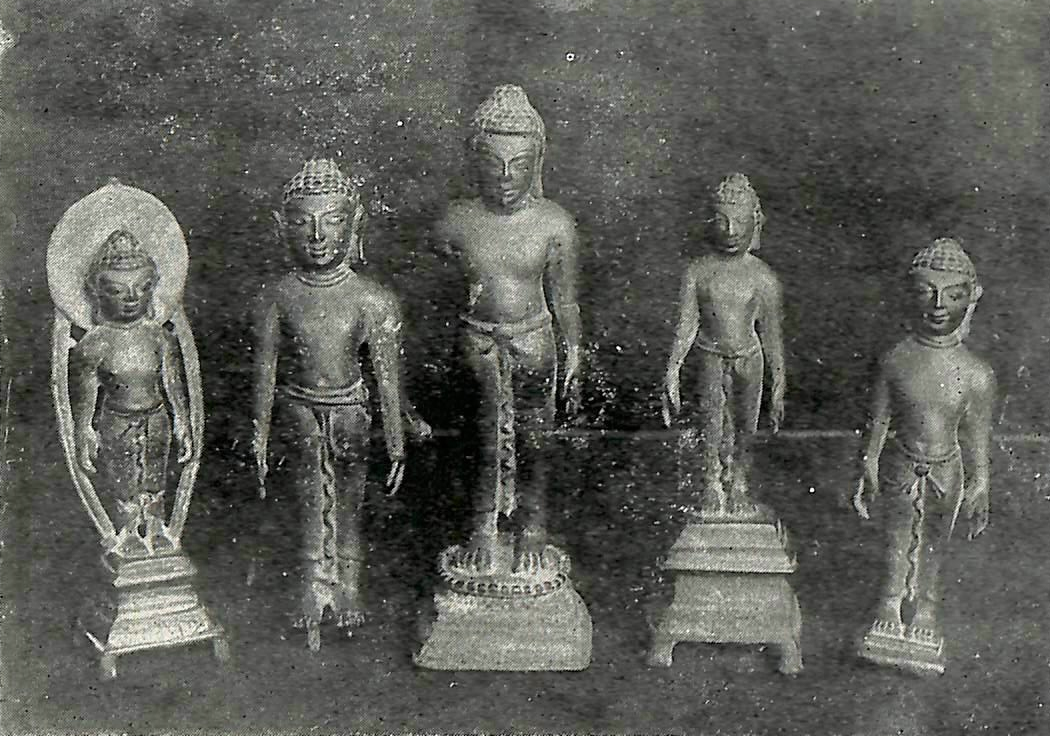
Five Jain Bronzes recovered from Vallabhi

Dharapaṭṭa was succeeded by Guhasena who reigned from c. 553 to c. 569 CE. He must be great king as the all later ruler from Śilāditya I to the last ruler records his name in grants.

Guhasena stopped using the term Paramabhattaraka Padanudhyata along his name like his predecessors, which denotes the cessation of displaying of the nominal allegiance to Magadha. He had assumed the sovereign title of Maharajadhiraja. During his early rule, the Maitraka kingdom was invaded by King of KannaujIshwaravarman. The Raivataka (Girnar) hill is mentioned in his Jaunpur stone inscription but who won the war is unclear as the inscription is fragmentary. It is assumed that Guhasena must have repelled the attack.

All his copper-plates record donations to Buddhist monasteries. He was a devotee of Shiva as mentioned in his grants and the copperplate bore the symbol of the Nandi, the vehicle of Shiva. He was interested in Buddhism in his last years of reign which is known from his grants. Guhasena wrote poems in Sanskrit, Prakrit and Saurseni Apabhramsa.

Early historians had considered Gahlots (Gohil) of Mewar (Guhilas of Medapata) as his descendants. James Tod had recorded one such legend but epigraph evidence does not support the assumption. Virji also makes the point that Gahlots were Brahmanas as per their inscriptions while the Maitrakas were Kshatriyas.

=== Dharasena II ===
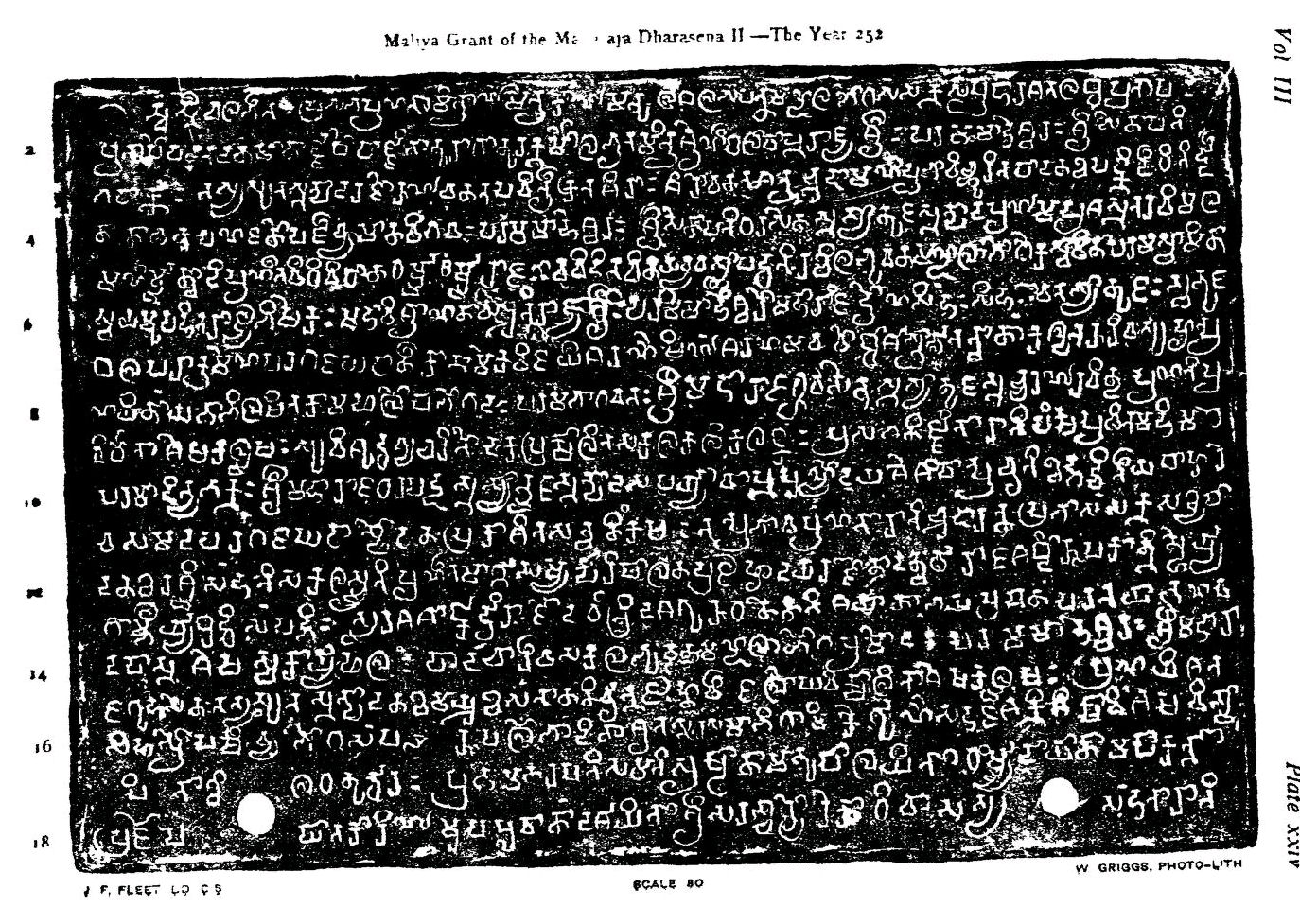
Maliya inscription of Dharasena II of the year 252 (571 CE).

Gahasena was succeeded by his son Dharasena II, who used the title of Samanta in his early grants and later readopts the title of Maharaja and later again as Mahasamanta. He reigned from 569 to 589–90 CE. It is considered that he had become subordinate to Kannauj king Ishanavarman for sometime between which reflect in the changes in titles. From Haraha inscription it known that Ishanavarman held sway over several rulers and Dharasena may have had to submit to him.

He had made land grants to Brahmanas noted in his copperplate grants. One of his grants of 254 or 257 VE mentions solar eclipse which had helped in establish the dating of the Valabhi Era (VE). His one grant mentions Sthiramati, the Buddhist monk mentioned by Chinese traveler Hiuen Tsang. One independent grant dated 574 CE made by Garulaka king Simhaditya is also found at Palitana along with him.

=== Śīlāditya I ===
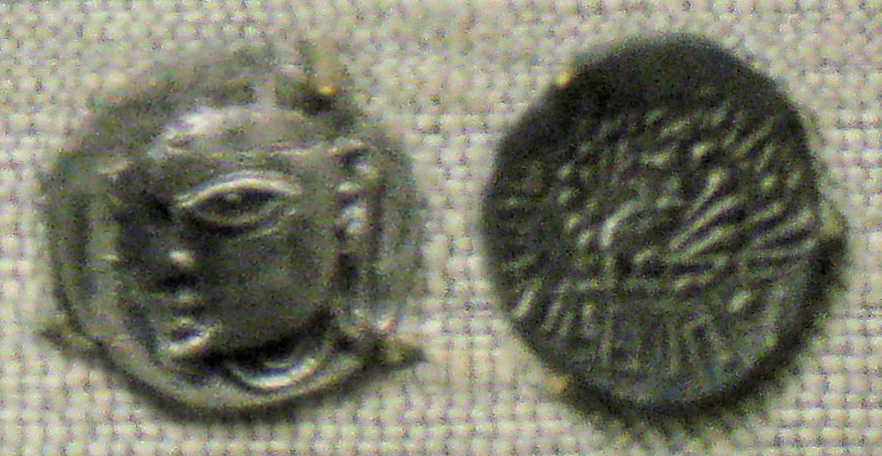
Coinage of Śilāditya (Maitraka, 606–616 CE, Gujarat), with head of king and geometric designs. National Museum, New Delhi.

Dharasena II was succeeded by Śīlāditya I who is also called Dharmāditya, the "sun of Dharma". He reigned from c. 590 - 615 CE. Manju-Sri-Mula-Kalpa assigns him thirty years. The Śatruñjaya Máhátmya has a prophetic account of one Śíláditya who will be a propagator of religion in Vikrama Saṃvat 477 (420 CE). The work is comparatively modern and does not correspond to chronology and dating of the Valabhi kingdom. Although no reliance can be placed on the date still his second name Dharmáditya gives support to his identification with the Śíláditya of the Máhátmya. Based on Manju-Sri-Mula-Kalpa and his grants, it is known that his rule extended from Malwa to the oceans of Kutch in western India.

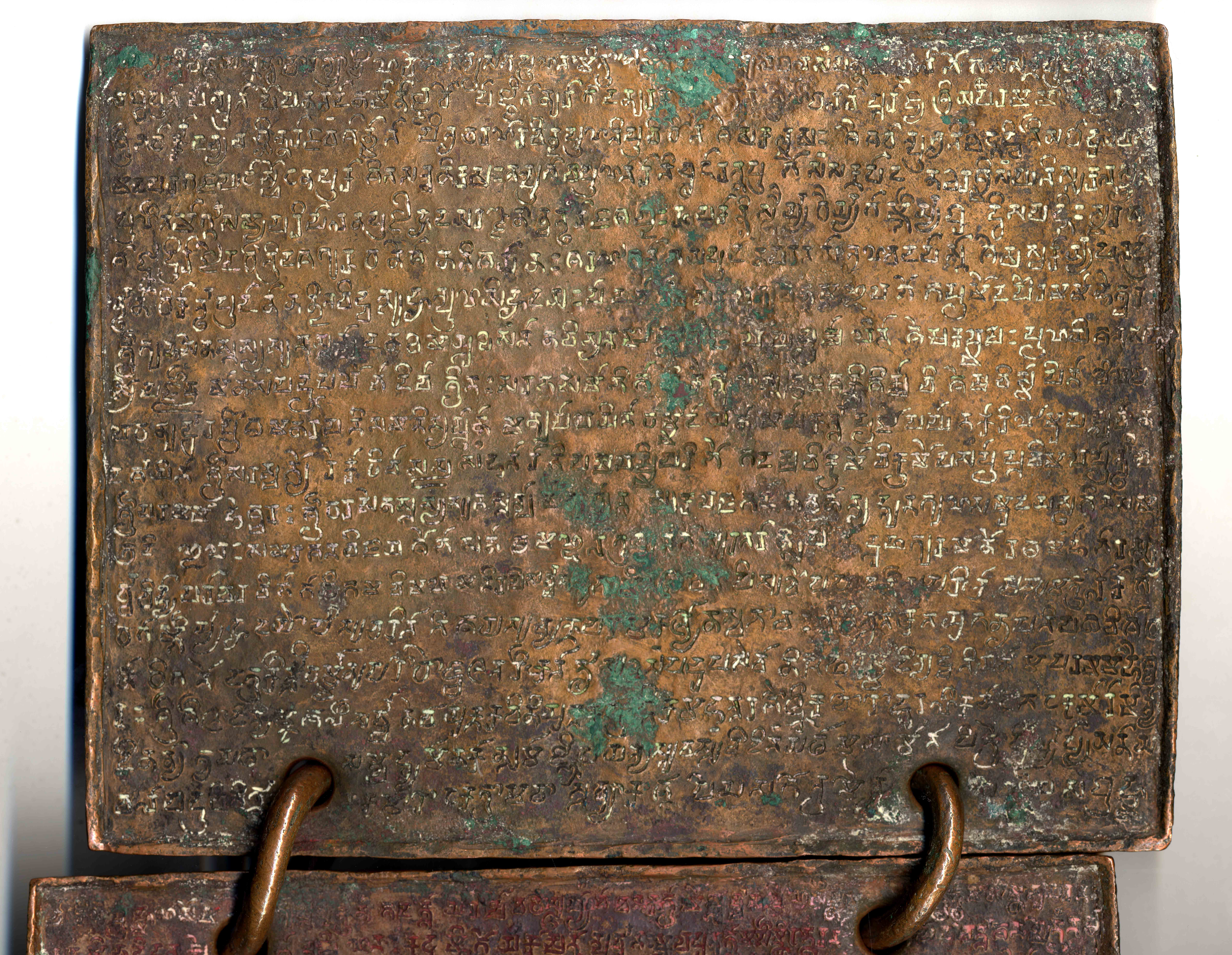
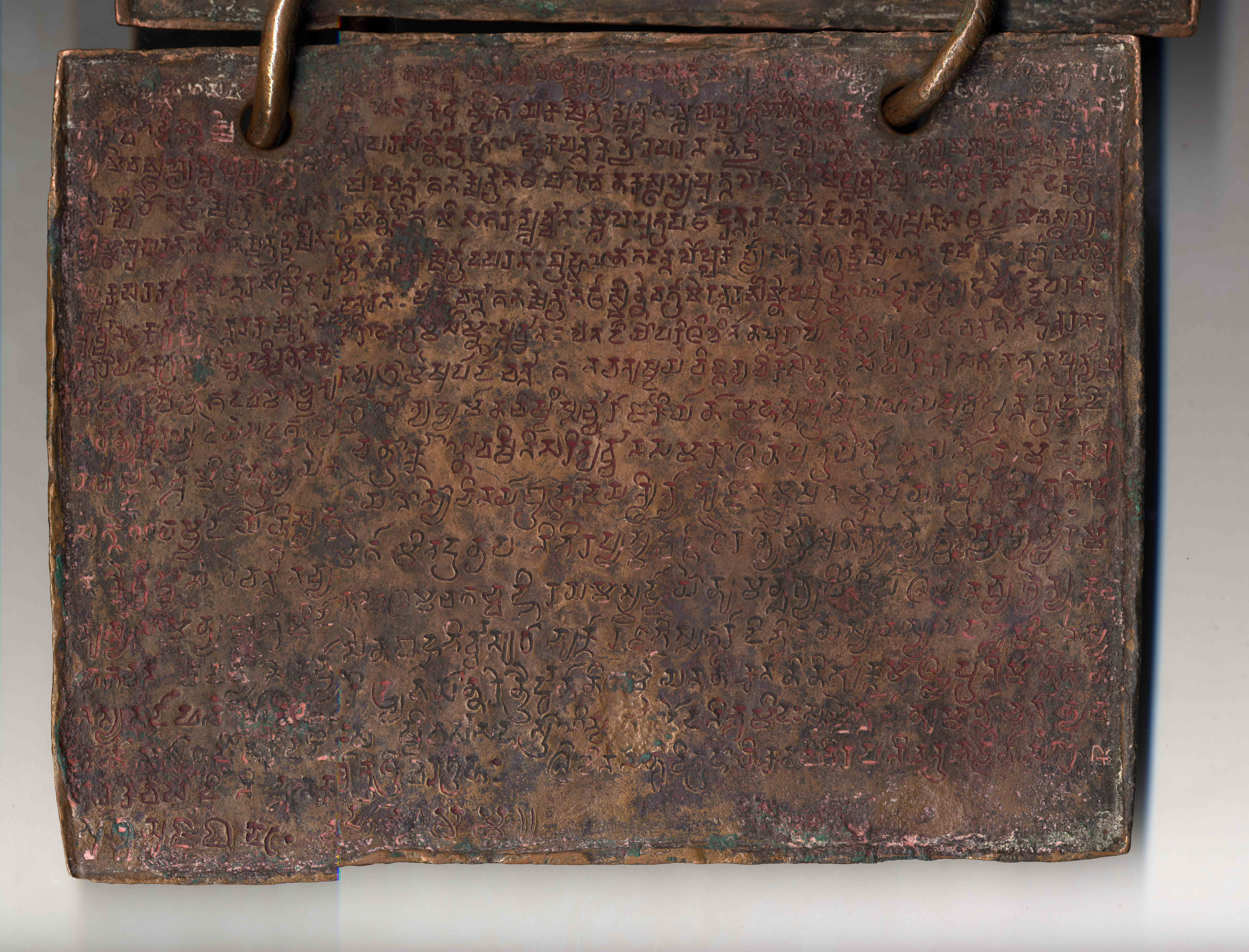
Copper plate grant issued by Śīlāditya I, dated year 290 [?] aśvayuja badi 10 recording a donation of villages and lands.

He was Shaiva. The one of his grant, to a temple of Śiva, has for its Dútaka the illustrious Kharagraha apparently the brother and successor of the king. He had made grants to sun temple and Buddhist monks show that he tolerated and respected Buddhism also. The writer of one of the grants is mentioned as the minister of peace and war Chandrabhaṭṭi; the Dútaka or causer of the gift in two of the Buddhist grants is Bhaṭṭa Ádityayaśas apparently some military officer. The Jain work Śatruñjaya Máhátmya mentions that its author was his preceptor. His equal treatment to all religions justifies his title Dharmāditya. The Śatruñjaya Máhátmya, though exaggerated, mentions that he had expelled some Buddhists from his kingdom sympathetic to his rival Harṣa. He is praised in accounts of Hiuen Tsang as a "monarch of great administrative ability and of rare kindness and compassion".

He had a son named Derabhaṭṭa. He was succeeded by his younger brother Kharagraha I. It seems that there must have been a contest between his elder brother Upendra and him but finally Kharagraha I had succeeded. Derabhaṭṭa is mentioned to have helped Śilāditya in conquering some region between Sahya and Vindhya. He probably had helped Pulakeshin in a war against Kalachuris and may be gained the region as a result. He may have ruled the region independently till his death. His son and successor Śilāditya may have ruled the region as an arrangement with his brother Karagraha. A queen named Janjika is mentioned in one of copperplates which may be a wife of Śilāditya I.

=== Kharagraha I ===
Śilāditya I was succeeded by his younger brother Kharagraha I, also known as Ishwaragraha. Virdi copperplate grant (616 CE) of Kharagraha I proves that his territories included Ujjain which is mentioned as "victorious camp". He was probably in a continued struggle with Harṣa started during the reign of his brother. He was Śaiva and reigned c. 615 - 621 CE.

=== Dharasena III ===
Kharagraha was succeeded by his son Dharasena III. He reigned from c. 621 to 627 CE. His only grant is made from the military camp at Kheṭaka (Kheda). Chapala mentioned in Manju-Sri-Mula-Kalpa as a successor of Śilāditya must be Dharasena III according to Virji while Jayaswal consider him as Kharagraha. He was Śaiva too. He had some gain in north Gujarat. He must have lost some power as his neighbouring kingdoms; Chalukya and Harshvardhan were in constant struggle.

=== Dhruvasena II Balāditya ===
Location of the Gurjaras, and neighbouring South Asian polities circa 600 CE, after the retreat of the Alchon Huns.

After death of Dharasena III, he was succeeded by his younger brother Dhruvasena II also known as Balāditya, the "rising son". He reigned from c. 627-641 CE. He was well versed in grammar and the science of polity. Hiuen Tsang had written "a lively and hasty disposition and his wisdom and statecraft were shallow". He further adds that "he had attached himself to the precious three recently", viz. the Buddha, Dhamma, and Sangha of Buddhism. he had made grants to Buddhist Viharas and Hindu temples alike. He used the title of Paramamaheshwara, thus Shaiva. He had renewed the grant to the Kottammhikadevi, a Hindu temple, by his ancestor Droṇasiṁha. Dadda II, the King of Lata had mentioned that he had given refuge to the king of Valabhi in a struggle with Harṣa. But it is unclear that he was Dhruvasena II or Dharasena IV. Huien Tsang had mentioned that he had married the daughter of Harṣavardhan of Kannauj, probably as the marriage allegiance.

His rule extended to Ratlam, a town west of Ujjain so whole modern central and north Gujarat were under the Maitrakas.

=== Dharasena IV ===
Dharasena IV succeeded Dhruvasena II and reigned from c. 641 to 650 CE. He had subdued Kingdom of Lata (south Gujarat) as he has issued copperplate grants from Bharuch. he had assumed the imperial titles of Paramabhattaraka Mahrajadhiraja Parameshvara Chakravartin. He had made grants to Buddhist Viharas and Brahmanas. He was a patron of scholars and the master archer. Probably during his reign, the Bhatti, the author of Bhattikavya or Ravanavadha, flourished. It is a grammatical poem.

As Dharasena IV had no son, the succession transferred to the elder branch, Derabhaṭṭa lineage. He was succeeded by Dhruvasena III.

=== Dhruvasena III ===
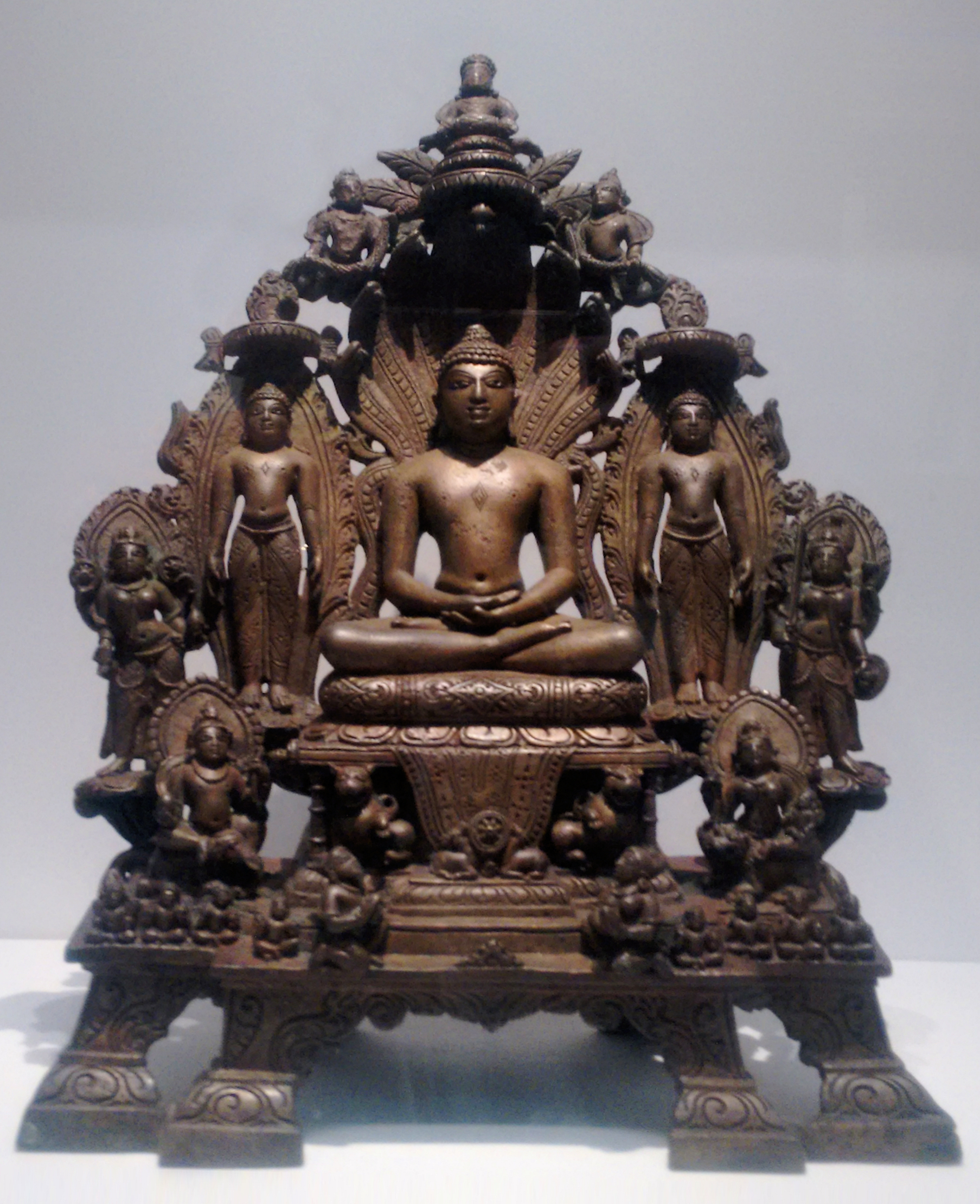
Parsvanatha with two other tirthankaras, yaksha and yakshi, Maitraka, 9th Century, Akota, Gujarat, National Museum, New Delhi

Dhruvasena III was a son of Derabhaṭṭa. He reigned from c. 650 to 654-655 CE. He had dropped the title of Chakravartin and was Shaiva. He may have lost his sway on Lata region to Chalukyas.

=== Kharagraha II ===
Kharagraha II Dharamaditya was a successor of his younger brother Dhruvasena II. He had made a grant from military camp at Pulindaka which suggest that he was in a continued struggle with Chalukyas. He reigned from c. 655 to 658. He had no son.

=== Śilāditya II ===
Śilāditya was a son of Śilāditya, the elder brother of Kharagraha II. As Kharagraha II had no son, he assumed the throne. He reigned from c. 658 to 685 CE. He has mentioned his father Derabhaṭṭa in his grants. He had probably recovered the Lata region from the Sendraka governor under the Chalukyas. The Chalukyas recovered the region under Vikramaditya I and placed his son Dharashraya Jayasimha as its governor. The region was still ruled by Gurjaras of Lata and Dadda III was probably in the constant struggle with the Maitrakas.

Arab historians mention that the Arab commander Ismail had attacked the Ghogha in 677 CE (AH 57) but give no details. He must have been defeated by Śilāditya II.

=== Śilāditya III ===
Śilāditya was a son and the successor of Śilāditya II. He reigned from c. 690 - 710 CE. Probably during this period, Panchasar held by Jayasekhara of Chavda dynasty was attacked.

=== Muslim invasions and decline ===
==== Śilāditya IV ====
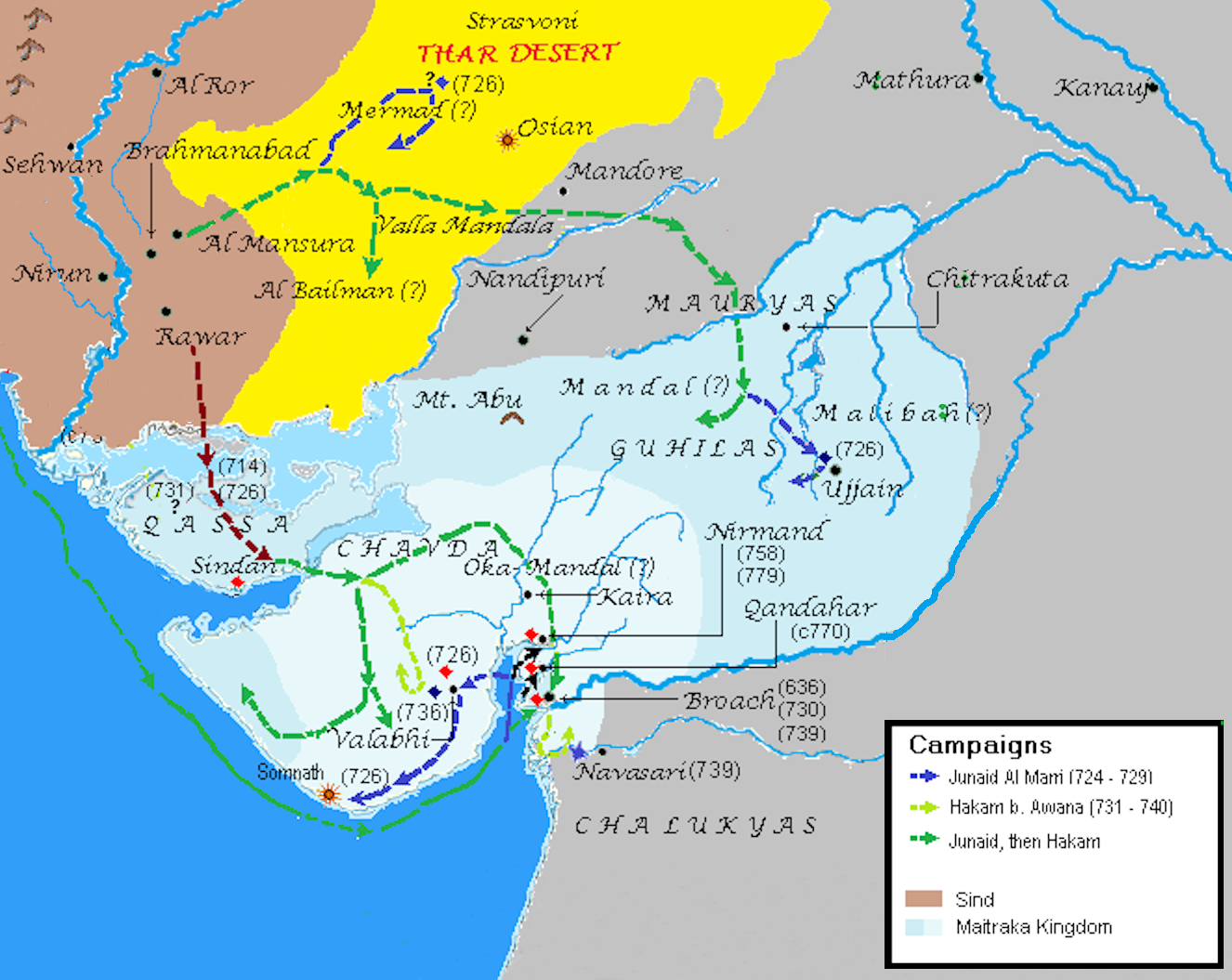
Campaigns from the Caliphal province of Sind into Gujarat (724-740 CE). Śilāditya IV was affected by the Muslim conquests in the Indian subcontinent and the Umayyad campaigns in India. Desert areas (Thar Desert) Caliphal province of Sind (712-854 CE) Kingdom of Valabhi (c.475–c.776 CE)

Śilāditya IV was a son of Śilāditya III who probably had Dharasena as his personal name. He ruled from c. 710 to 740 CE. Chalukya king Vikramaditya II had captured the Kheṭaka region from Valabhi with the presumed help of Jayabhatta IV, the king of Lata. Sanjan plate of 733 CE informs that Rashtrakuta Indra I had forcefully married Chalukya princess Bhvanaga at Kaira (Kheda) so the region must be under them then.

Biladuri, the Arab historian informs that the kingdom was invaded by the Arabs under Junaid, Governor of the Caliphal province of Sind, during the Caliphate of Hisham (724-743 CE). The invasion was carried out in 735-736 CE, and mentioned by the kingdom of Lata. The Muslims invaded all of the Gurjara region of north and south. The Navsari plate of Avanijanashraya Pulakeshin mentions that the Tajjika (Arabs) had destroyed the Kachchelas (of Kutch), Saindhavas, Surastra, Chavotkata (Chavdas), Mauryas and Gurjaras (of Lata) and proceeded towards the Deccan. Jayabhatta helped the Maitrakas in battle at Valabhi at which they had defeated the Arabs but eventually lost. Finally at Navsari, the confederate army led by Chalukya troops routed the Arabs. Pulakeshin was awarded the titles of Dakshinapatha Svadharna, the solid pillar of the Deccan, Anivartaka-nivartayitr, the Repeller of the Unrepellable and Avanijanashraya, the refuge of the people.

==== Śilāditya V ====
After the Arab invasion, the fragmented western states were organised under Śilāditya V. Malwa was lost to th Kingdom of Gurjaradesa (not to be confused with Gujarat; Gurjaradesa referred to eastern Rajasthan, then, the domain of the Pratiharas) before the invasion. He probably had tried to recover Malwa as one of his grant (760 CE) is made from military camp at Godraka (Godhra). He must have failed to recover Malwa but nonetheless recovered the Kheṭaka (Kheda) region. He had to face another invasion of the Tajjika (Arabs) from the sea in 759 CE fighting for Umayyad Caliphate. The naval fleet under Amarubin Jamal was sent by Hasham, the governor of Sindh to the coast of Barda (the Barda hills near Porbandar). The invasion was defeated by the naval fleet of the Saindhava dynasty which was in allegiance with the Maitrakas. He reigned from c. 740 -762 CE.

==== Śilāditya VI Dhrubhaṭa ====
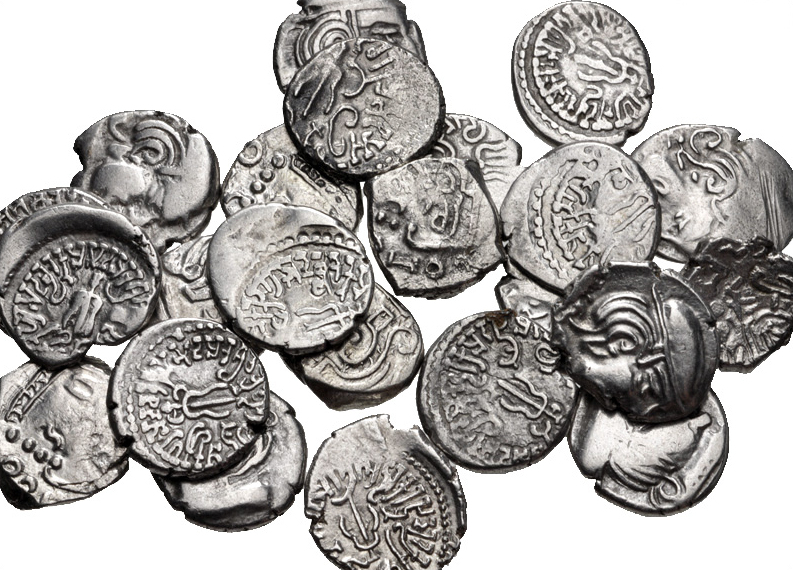
Valabhi (Saurashtra) drachms. Late 5th-8th century CE. Capped head right in Ksatrapa style. Trident with Brahmi legend around.

Śilāditya VI, also known as Dhrubhaṭa, reigned c. 762 to c. 776 CE. As he had issued a grant from Anandpura (Vadnagar), it is assumed that he was on expansion again taking advantage of the prevailing situation in Rastrakutas and was in a struggle with the Pratiharas. Saurashtra was again invaded by the Tajjikas (Arabs) in 776 CE (AH 159). They captured the township of Barada but the epidemic broke out. The Arabs had to return and the Caliph had decided to stop further attempt to enter India. Agguka I of the Saindhava dynasty had claimed in his inscription a victory thus they had to withdraw. The Maitraka dynasty ended by c. 783 CE. The fall of the dynasty is attributed to the Arab invasion from the sindh Apart from legendary accounts which connects fall of Vallabi with the Tajjika (Arab) invasions, no historical source mention how the dynasty ended.

The governors of Girinagar (Girnar) and Vamanasthali (Vanthli) became independent and established their own dynasty on the fall of Vallabhi.

== Administration ==
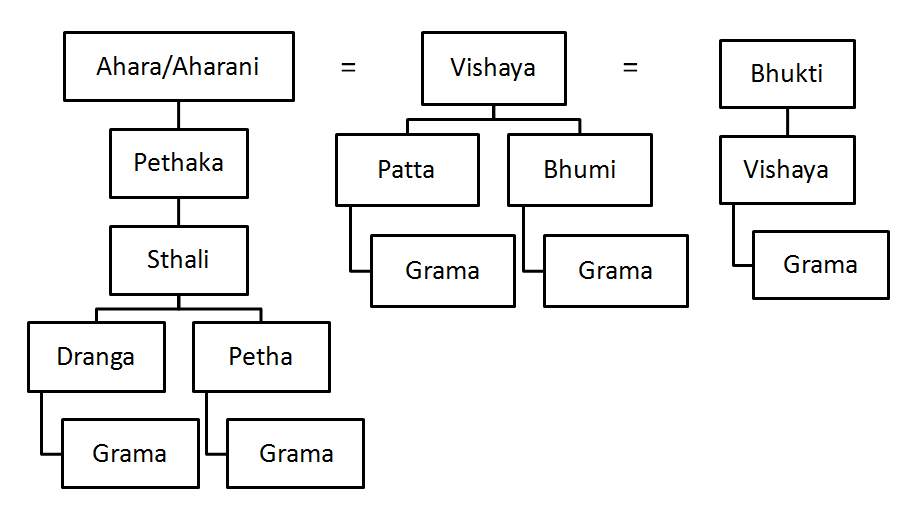
Administrative divisions in the Maitraka kingdom

There were administrative divisions managed by head of the division and helped by his subordinates. The highest division Vishaya were headed by Rashtrapati or Amatya and the lowest division Grama (equivalent to village) was headed by Gramakuta.

Maitrakas set up a Vallabhi University which came to be known far and wide for its scholastic pursuits and was compared with the Nalanda University.

== Architecture ==
=== Temples and monuments ===
Mentioned in the literary sources

The copper plate inscriptions of Maitrakas mentions religious edifices, Brahmanical as well as Buddhist. Some Buddhist monuments were constructed by the Maitrakas themselves. Some Brahmanical shrines includes Shiva temple at Vatapadra in Saurashtra (before 609 CE), Bhartishwara temple (extant in 631 CE), Goddess Kotammahika temple at Trisangamaka (extant in 639 CE, built during or before reign of Droṇasiṁha), Pandurarya temple at Hathab in Saurashtra (502 CE inscription). Other temples include Saptamatrika temple at Madasara-sthali (extant in 676 CE), Sun temple at Vatapadra (609 CE) and Bhadreniyaka (611 CE); all in Saurashtra.

Several Buddhist monuments were built by Maitrakas. Majority of them were built in and around Vallabhi. Bhataraka probably the Bhataraka-vihara. Princess Dudda, sister of Dhruvasena I, built Dudda-vihara around the onset of the sixth century. Before 605 CE, Śilāditya I built Śilāditya-vihara Vamsakata in Saurashtra. Abhyantarika-vihara (before 567 CE) was built by a lady Mimma. Kakka Mankila added Kakka-vihara to Dudda-vihara mandala before 589 CE and another Gohaka-vihara was built there before 629 CE. The Yakshasura-vihara for nuns at Vallabhi was built around middle of the sixth century. Before 549 CE, Ajita, a merchant, built Ajita-vihara, probably besides the Yakshasura-vihara. Purnabhatta-vihara was built by Purnabhatta before 638 CE to the later group. Skandabhatta II, grandson of Mahasandhivigrahaka Sandabhatta I, built a Sandabhatta-vihara at Yodhavaka.

Literary sources also mention some temples dedicated to the Jinas. Around 601 CE, Shantinatha temple at Vallabhi existed. At the time of destruction of Vallabhi, the images of Chandraprabha, Adinatha, Parshwanatha and Mahavira were transferred to safer places. The temples of Parshwanatha and Shantinatha existed at Vardhamana (Wadhwan) and Dostatika as well as probably the temple of Yakshi Ambika on the summit of Mount Girnar.

Most of the constructions in this period were made of non-durable materials like bricks and wood. None of them survives now.

Extant temples

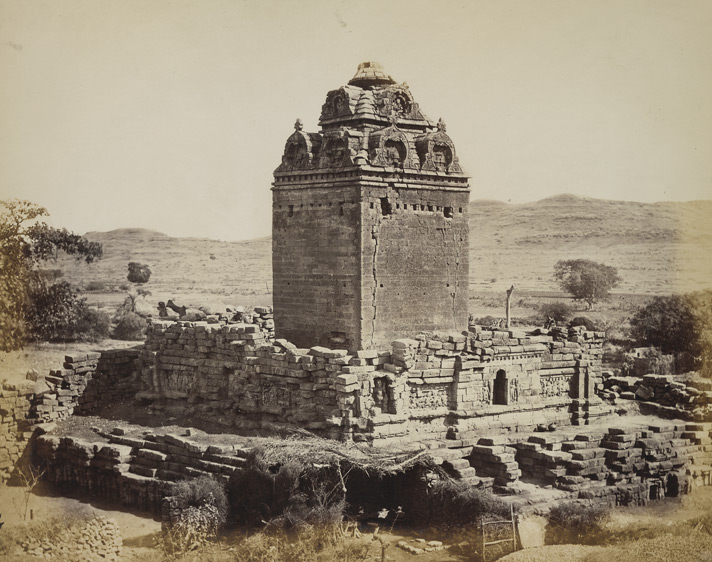
Gop Temple

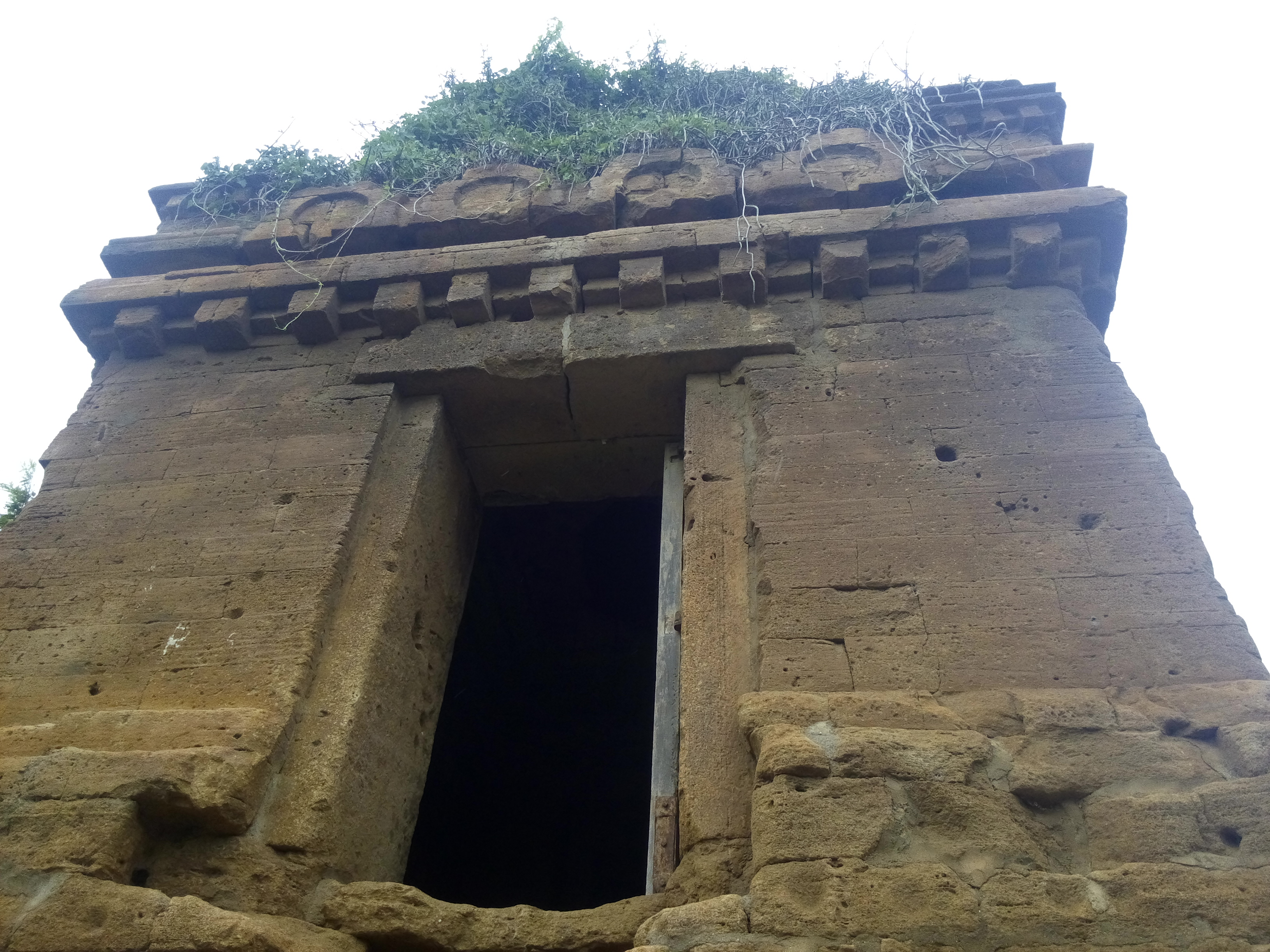
Firangi Deval at Kalsar

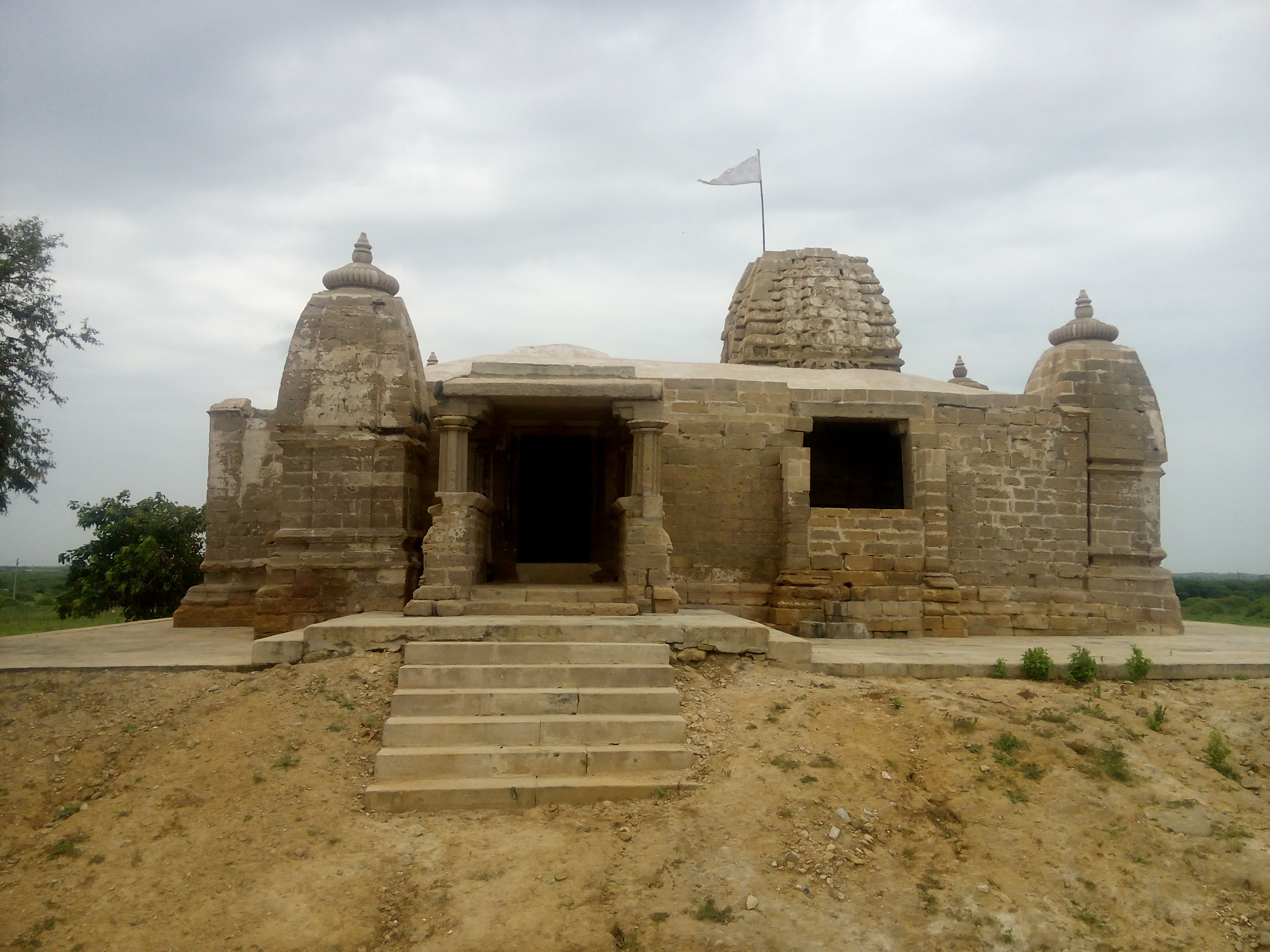
Magderu, Dhrasanvel, Okhamandal

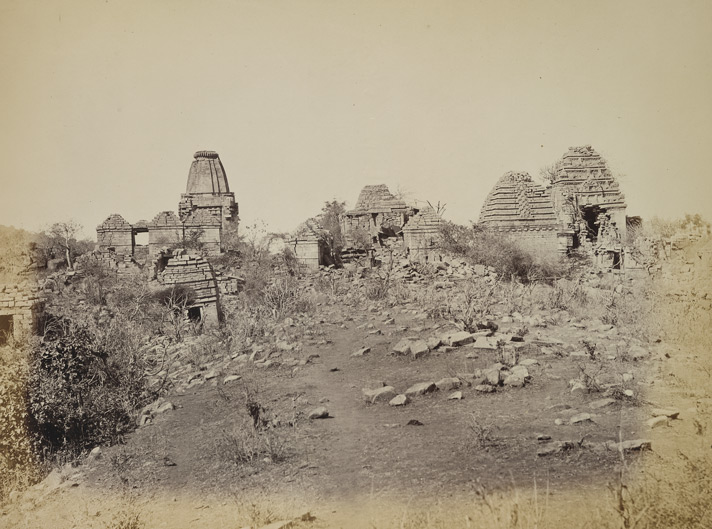
Ruined temples at Sonkansari, Ghumli

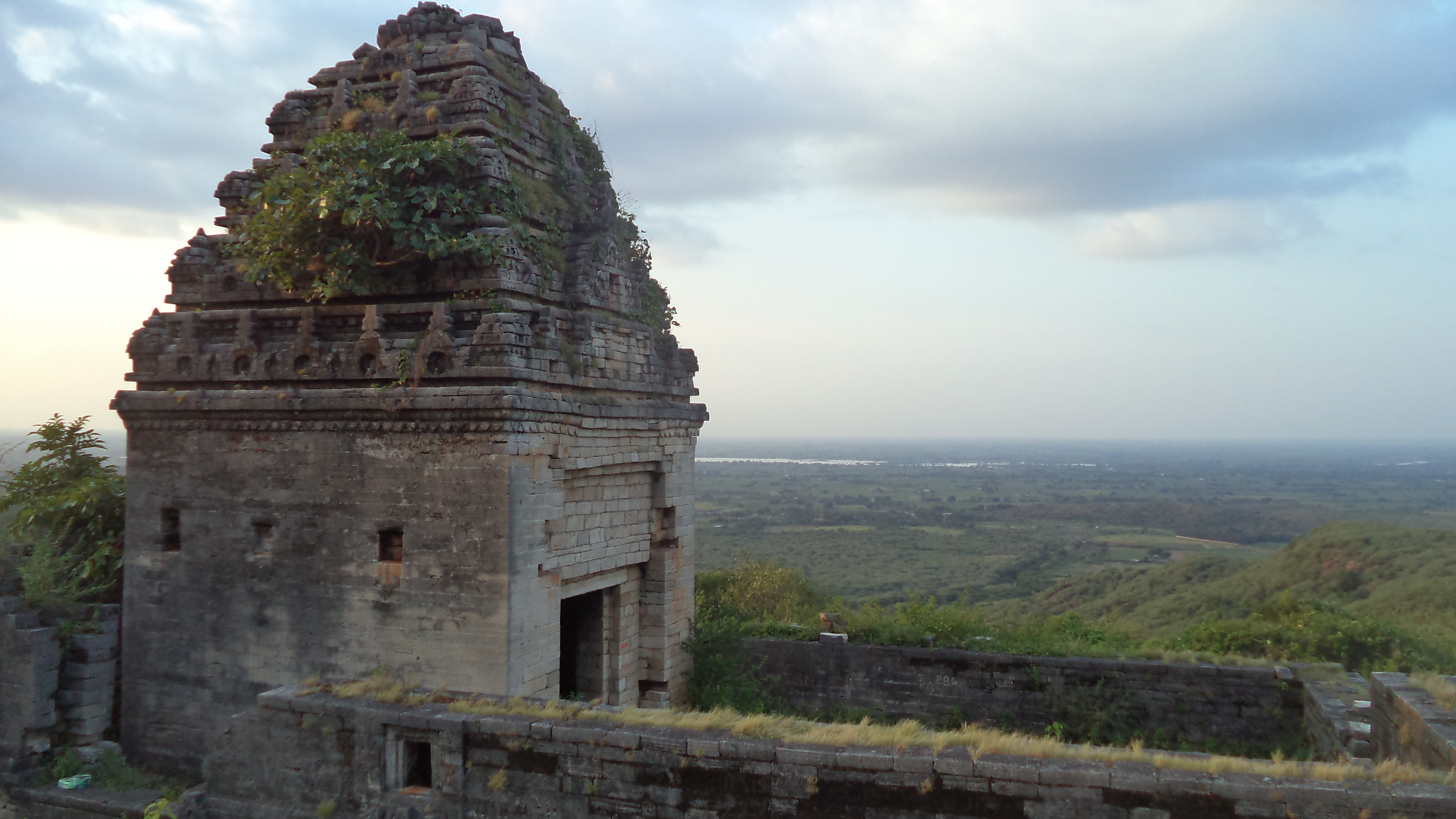
Temple at Sonkansari, Ghumli

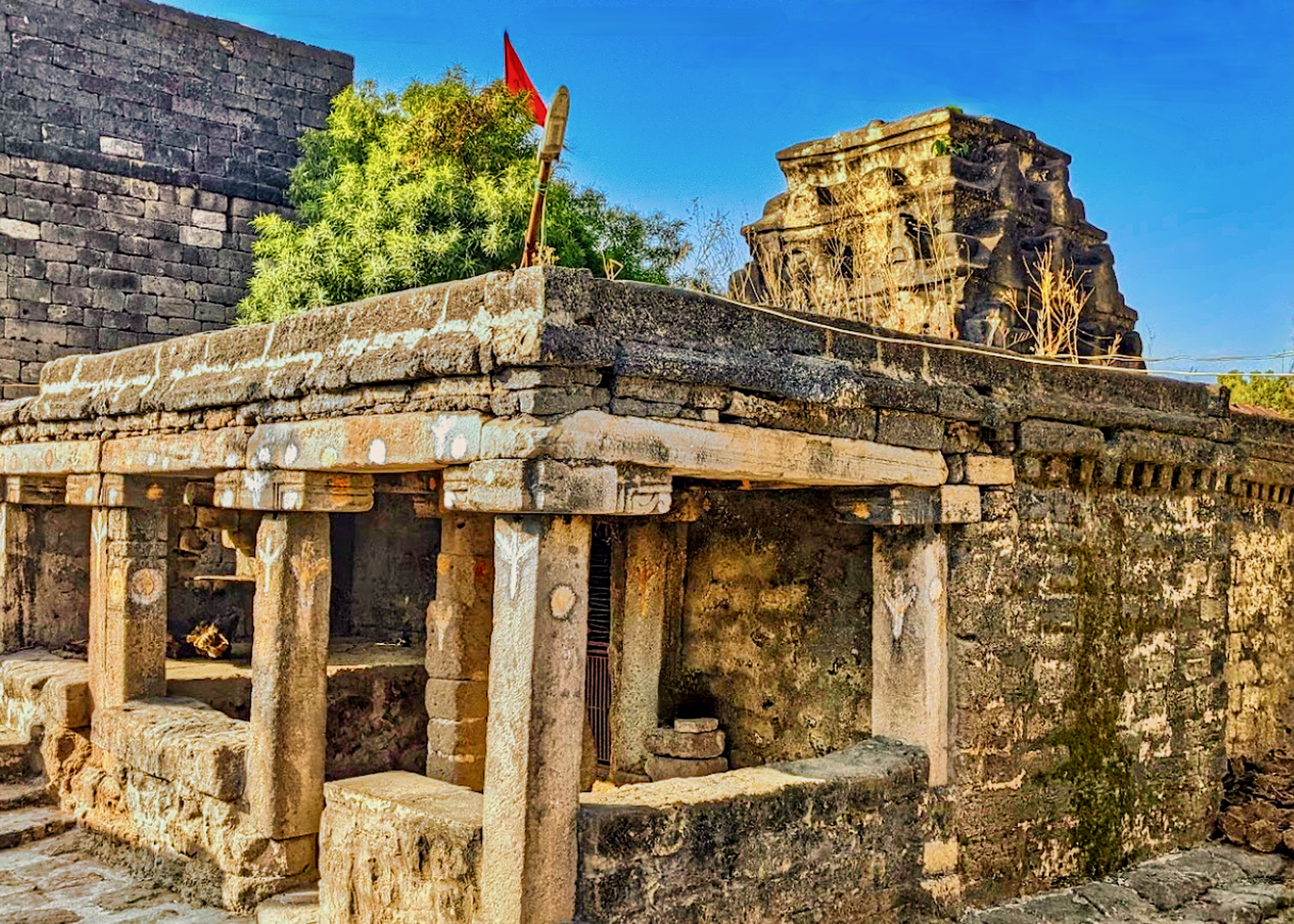
Temple at Balej

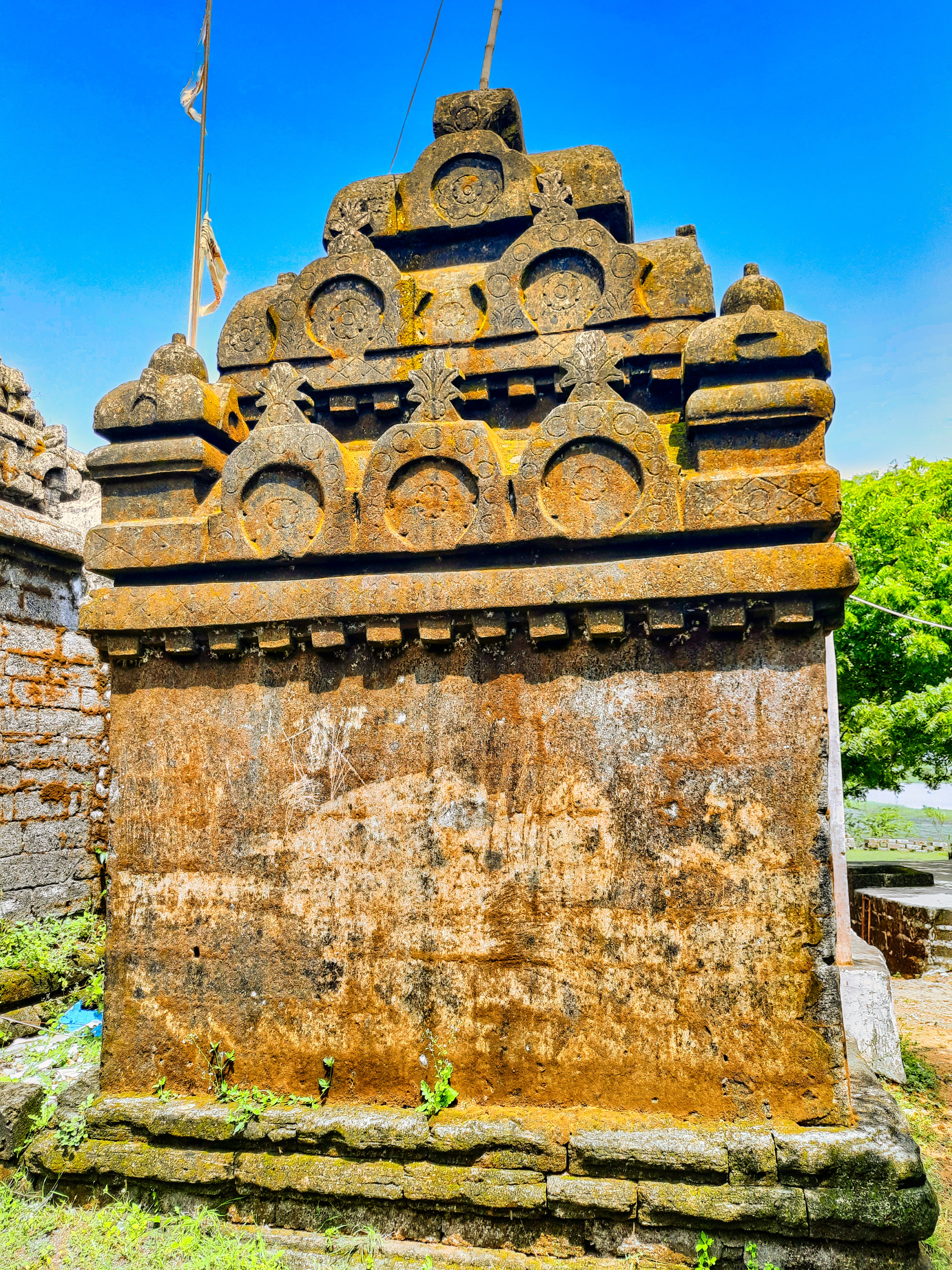
Temple at Bhansara

The architecture is in continuum of earlier Gupta period architecture found in caves at Uparkot and Khambhalida. More than hundred temples of this period is known. Almost all of them are located along the coastal belt of the western Saurashtra region except the one at Kalsar and few temples in the Barda hills region. Several temples of them are located in the territories controlled by the Saindhavas.

The extant temples of this period are the temple at Gop, Sonkansari (Ghumli), Pachtar, Prachi, Firangi Deval at Kalsar, group of temples at Vasai near Dwarka, Kadvar, Bileshwar, Sutrapada, Visavada, Kinderkheda, Pata, Miyani, Pindara, Khimrana, two temples at Dhrasanvel (Magderu and Kalika Temple), two temples near Dhrewad (Kalika Mata Temple), Gayatri temple and Naga temple and Sun temple at Pasnavada, early temples at Junagadh, Gosa, Boricha, Prabhas Patan, Savri, Navadra, Suvarnatirth temple at Dwarka, Jhamra, Degam near Porbandar, Sarma near Ghed. Other extant temples include the temple groups at Khimeshwara, Shrinagar, Nandeshwara, Balej, Bhansara, Odadar; and the shrines at Bokhira, Chhaya, Visavada, Kuchadi, Ranavav, Tukada, Akhodar, Kalavad, Bhanvad, Pasthar, and Porbandar.

Two kunds are known of this period, at Kadvar and Bhansara. The Shaivaite monastery at the Khimeshwara group of temples is the oldest known Brahminical monastery of India, preceding three centuries to that in central India.

These temples are austere in their design and simple in decoration. They are important in architectural study to know the origin of Nagara-style shikhara and the beginning of their complex designs in temple architecture. These temples also point to the second of the two early Gujarat temple architecture schools; the north Gujarat early Nagara style and the Saurashtra style which initially influenced and ultimately ousted by the evolving Nagara style. The Saurashtra style disappeared by the tenth century.

== Coinage ==
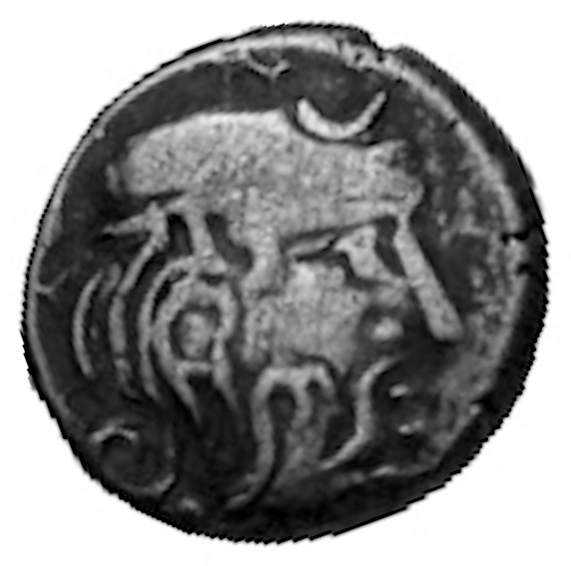
Drachm of the Matraikas of Valabhi.

The Maitrakas continued coinage styles established by their predecessors; the Guptas and the Western Kshatrapas. Large number of copper and silver coins are found in Vallabhi and elsewhere. There are two types of coins found. The first were 6" in diameter and weighted 29 grains. They were perhaps earlier coins modeled after the Western Kshatrapa coins. Later coins were similar to the Gupta coins in shape, size and legends. Like Gupta coins, they were not made of pure silver but silver-coated.

The obverse of coin had the head of the kings facing right, as in Kshatrapa coins, but no legends or date. The reverse had Trishula, the trident, the emblem of Shiva. An axe (parashu) is added in reverse of some later coins. These symbols are surrounded by the legend in debased characters of Brahmi script. It reads,

Rájño Mahákshatrapasa Bhatárakasa Mahesara–Śrí Bhaṭṭárakasa
or
Rájño, Mahákshatrapasa Bhatarakasa Mahesara Śrí Śarvva Bhaṭṭárakasa

Translation: "[This is a coin] of the illustrious the Shaivaite, Bhattaraka, the great king; the great Kshtrapa; the Lord and the devotee of Maheshwara.

== List of kings of Valabhi ==
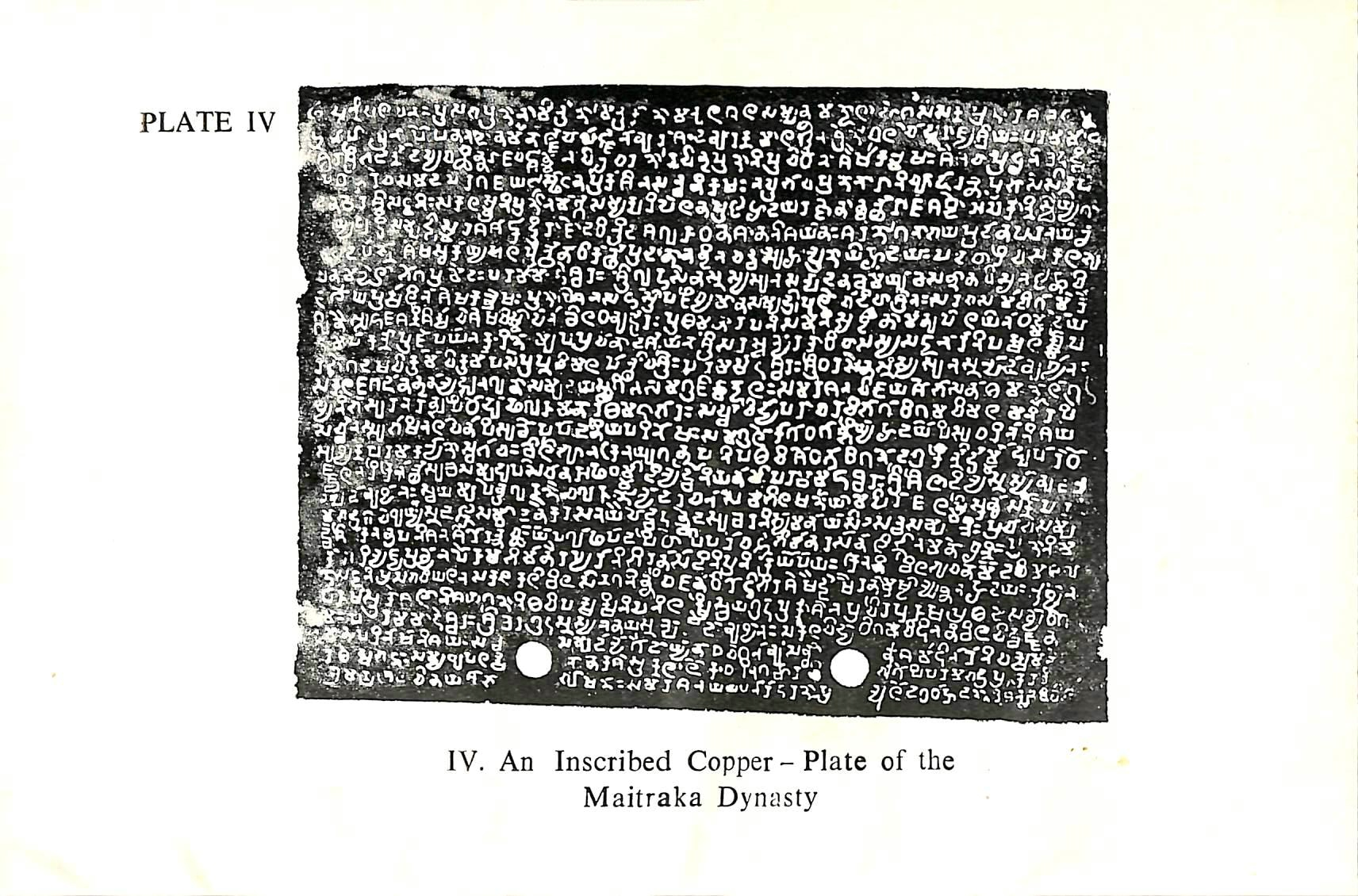
An inscribed copper-plate of the Maitraka dynasty

The list as follows:

- Bhaṭārka (c. 470-c. 492)
- Dharasena I (c. 493-c. 499)
- Dronasinha (also known as Maharaja) (c. 500-c. 520)
- Dhruvasena I (c. 520-c. 550)
- Dharapaṭṭa (c. 550-c. 556)
- Gruhasena (c. 556-c. 570)
- Dharasena II (c. 570-c. 595)
- Śīlāditya I (also known as Dharmāditya) (c. 595-c. 615)
- Kharagraha I (c. 615-c. 626)
- Dharasena III (c. 626-c. 640)
- Dhruvasena II (also known as Balāditya) (c. 640-c. 644)
- Chakravarti king Dharasena IV (also known with the titles Param Bhaṭārka, Maharajadhiraja, Parameshwara) (c. 644-c. 651)
- Dhruvasena III (c. 650-c. 654-655)
- Kharagraha II (c. 655-c. 658)
- Śīlāditya II (c. 658- c. 685)
- Śīlāditya III (c. 690- c. 710)
- Śīlāditya IV (c. 710- c. 740)
- Śīlāditya V ( c. 740- c. 762)
- Śīlāditya VI Dhrubhaṭa ( c. 762- c. 776)

== Sources ==
- Jain, Kailash Chand (1991), Lord Mahāvīra and His Times, Motilal Banarsidass Publishing House, ISBN 978-81-208-0805-8
- Virji, Krishnakumari Jethabhai (1955). Ancient history of Saurashtra: being a study of the Maitrakas of Valabhi V to VIII centuries A. D. Indian History and Culture Series. Konkan Institute of Arts and Sciences.
