= Gopal Gupta =

Gopal Gupta may refer to:

- Gopal Gupta (computer scientist), Indian computer scientist
- Gopal Gupta (philosopher), Indian philosopher
