= Garulaka dynasty =

Dynasty that ruled western India from c. 5th to 7th century

Garulaka
- Country: Vassal of Kingdom of Valabhi
- Founded: c. 5th century
- Founder: Shura I
- Final ruler: Simhaditya
- Seat: Phamka-prasravana (probably)
- Dissolution: c. 7th century

The Garulakas was a medieval Indian dynasty that ruled western Saurashtra (now in Gujarat, India) probably from 5th to 7th century CE as a vassal of Maitrakas of Valabhi. Five rulers of the dynasty are known from two donation charters dated to 6th century CE.

== History ==
Their capital was probably at Phamka-prasravana (possibly Jhunjharijhar near Dhank if read as Dhanka-prasravana). It could be at Gop as well. It was in western Saurashtra.

There are two donation charters discovered of the dynasty; of Varahdasa II's from 549 CE and of Simhaditya's from 574 CE. The first known ruler was Shura I, who was a rajasthaniya of Maitraka ruler Bhatarka. He held Bhatarka-vihara at Valabhi. His son was Senapati Varahadasa I who was succeeded by his son Shura II. Shura II's brother Varahadsa II had granted a land to Buddhist vihara in 549 CE. The land it was originally granted to Garulakas by Maitrakas. Varahadasa captured Dwarka, built many temples and held title Dwarkadhipati. His successor Simhaditya granted a land to Brahmin in 574 CE. There is no more information about the dynasty and it is assumed that their rule may have extended till the end of 7th century CE.

The ruler were told parama-bhagavata and Garulaka may be derived from Garudaka, a term based on Garuda.

In the mid-8th century, the same region was ruled by Saindhava dynasty.

== Architecture ==
The temples constructed in this period follows the contemporary and earlier traditions of Maitrakas. The most temples of the period falls under the region ruled by Garulakas, except at Kalsar and Prabhas.

== List of rulers ==
- Rajasthaniya Shura I
- Senapati Varahadasa I
- Maharaja Shura II
- Varahadasa II (c. 549 CE)
- Simhaditya (c. 574 CE)

== Bibliography ==
- Shastri, Hariprasad Gangashankar (1974). Parikh, Rasiklal Chhotalal; Shastri, Hariprasad Gangashankar (eds.). ગુજરાતનો રાજકીય અને સાંસ્કૃતિક ઇતિહાસ: મૈત્રક કાલ અને અનુ-મૈત્રક કાલ [Political and Cultural History of Gujarat: Maitraka Era and Post-Maitraka Era]. Research Series – Book No. 68 (in Gujarati). Vol. III. Ahmedabad: Bholabhai Jeshingbhai Institute of Learning and Research. pp. 136–137.
