= Vishaya =

Historical administrative unit of India

A vishaya (IAST: Viṣaya) was a historical administrative unit of India, generally equivalent to a modern district.

Several other terms for units equivalent to a modern district appear in historical inscriptions, including āhāra, rashtra (rāṣṭra), maṇḍala, and deśa. The exact meaning of these terms varies by the period, the ruling dynasty, and the region. For example:

- In the early medieval inscriptions of Bengal region:
  - Paranayi-vishaya is mentioned as a part of the Samatata-mandala
  - Gokalika-mandala is mentioned as a part of the Kotivarsha-vishaya
  - Khadi-vishaya is another name for Khadi-mandala
- Some inscriptions mention units with multiple designations, such as Gopa-rashtra-vishaya and Khetak-ahara-vishaya (presumably, the territory called "Gopa" was formerly designated as a rashtra and then re-designated as a vishaya).
- Sometimes, a vishaya referred to a subdivision larger than a district.

The governor of a vishaya was called a vishaya-pati or a vishayadhyaksha. A vishaya was often included in a larger subdivisions such as a bhukti (province). It was often divided into smaller units such as a bhoga.
