= Gopalakrishnayya =

Gopalakrishnayya and Gopalkrishnaiah is an Indian (Telugu) male given name referring to the Gopala-Krishna form of the Hindu deity Krishna. It may refer to:

- Duggirala Gopalakrishnayya, an Indian freedom fighter and member of the Indian National Congress
- Vavilala Gopalakrishnayya, a legislator in Andhra Pradesh, India

== See also ==
- Gopal Krishna (disambiguation)
