= Gopi (disambiguation) =

Gopi is a word of Sanskrit origin meaning "cow-herd girl'".

Gopi may also refer to:

- Bharath Gopi, Malayali Indian actor, director, and producer
- Gopichand Lagadapati (born 1981), Indian actor, writer and director
- Gopi (1970 film), an Indian Hindi-language film
- Gopi (2006 Kannada film), an Indian family drama film
- Gopi – Goda Meeda Pilli, a 2006 Indian Telugu-language comedy film
- Gopi (2019 film), a Nepalese drama film
- Gopi Arya, a fictional R&AW handler in the Indian YRF Spy Universe, played by Ranvir Shorey

== See also ==
- Gopa (caste), an Indian caste
- GOP (disambiguation)
- Gopal (disambiguation)
