= GOP (disambiguation) =

GOP stands for Grand Old Party, a nickname for the Republican Party in the United States.

GOP or gop may also refer to:

== Government, politics, and culture ==
- Government of Pakistan, the federal government of the Islamic Republic of Pakistan
- Guardians of Peace, a hacker group, suspected to be a North Korean cybermilitary unit
- Gono Odhikar Parishad, a political party in Bangladesh
- Gop, or gopnik, a Russian term for a juvenile delinquent
- Yeretuar language, an Austronesian language spoken in Indonesia (ISO 639-3 code: gop)

== Computing ==
- Group of pictures, in video coding
- Graphics Output Protocol, a component of the Unified Extensible Firmware Interface

== Places and transportation ==
- Gop, Odisha, a village in India
- The Gop, a Neolithic mound in Wales
- Górnośląski Okręg Przemysłowy, the Upper Silesian Industrial Region, Poland
- Gatesville Municipal Airport, Texas, United States (FAA LID code: GOP)
- Gorakhpur Airport, Uttar Pradesh, India (IATA code: GOP)

== Other uses ==
- Gross operating profit, in accounting

== See also ==
- Gopa (caste), an Indian caste
- Gopi (disambiguation)
- Gopal (disambiguation)
- Gaziosmanpaşa (disambiguation)
