= Gopalan =

Gopalan may refer to:

- A. K. Gopalan (1904–1977), Indian Communist leader
- K. P. Gopalan (1908–1977), Indian Communist leader
- K. P. R. Gopalan (died 1997), Indian Communist leader
- M. J. Gopalan (1909–2003), Indian cricket and hockey player
  - M. J. Gopalan Trophy, a cricket tournament between Ceylon and Madras
- Prahladan Gopalan, Indian politician
- Prema Gopalan, Indian social activist
- P.V. Gopalan (1911–1998), Indian freedom fighter and civil servant
- Shyamala Gopalan (1938–2009), Indian-American cancer researcher and civil rights activist
- Susheela Gopalan (1929–2001), MP and Indian Communist leader
- Gopalan, central character of the 2008 Indian film Crazy Gopalan
- 7754 Gopalan, an asteroid
- S. Gopalan or Gopulu (1924–2015), Indian illustrator

== See also ==
- Gopal (disambiguation)
