= Gopal Das (disambiguation) =

Gopal Das (Hindi, from Sanskrit गोपाल दास, Gopāla Dāsa), means servant of Gopal, and can refer to:

- Gopala Dasa, exponent of the Dvaita school of philosophy
- Gopaldas Ambaidas Desai, Indian independence activist
- Gopaldas Neeraj, poet
- Gaur Gopal Das, a Spiritual leader and motivational speaker of ISKCON order
- Gopaldas Shankarlal Agrawal, Maharashtra legislator
- Gopal Das Shrestha, Nepal journalist
