= Gopal Chandra Lamichhane =

Nepali film director

- गोपाल चन्द्र लामिछाने
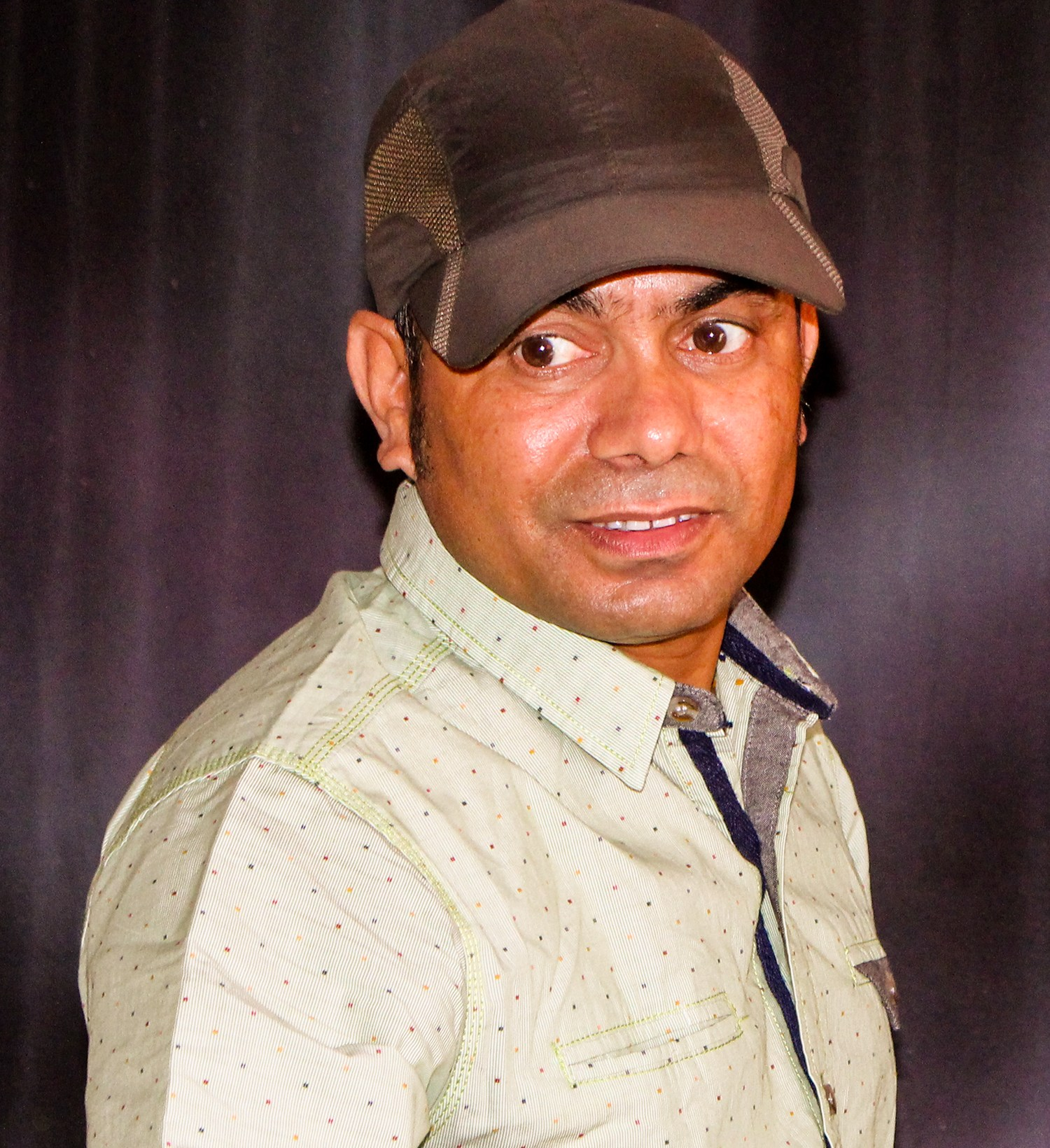
- Born: 14 January 1974 (age 52); Shivalaya V.D.C. 4, Parbat, Nepal
- Citizenship: Nepali
- Occupation: Film Director
- Years active: 1989-present
- Spouse: Gita Kumari Giri Lamichhane
- Children: 2
- Website: gopalchandralamichhane.com

Gopal Chandra Lamichhane (Nepali: गोपाल चन्द्र लामिछाने) (born: 14 January 1974) is the general secretary of Nepal Film Directors Guild. He started his career in film in 1989.

He directed the Nepali feature films Boksi, Kina lagchha maya and Janta Jindabad. He also directed the short films Aaina (translation:The Mirror) and OMM (Oh My Man). He directed the Nepali television serials Hijo Aaja Bholi, Archana and Dharti Aakash as well. He has also acted in many Nepali feature films and dramas. He started his career in film industry as an assistant film director in films like Ye Mero Hajur, Trishna, Sukha Dhuka and Malai Maaf Garideu among others. He has directed documentary features such as Morong Jilla, Sahakari Sangharu, Ko Gatibidhi and The Living Myth.

He has written script for many dramas and feature films such as Vastabikta, Sadak Ko Jindagi, Janma Bhumiko Rodhan, Pitamber Le Dhakiya Ka Lash Ajhai Jiudai Chhan, Nasha Ke Hudaina Ra Yaha, Nasha Vastabikta, Naya Bihaniko Khoji, Navaya Nepal, Bato Biraya Ko Yatri and others.

== Filmography ==
- The Mirror - Director
- Boksi (The Witch) - Director
- Kina Lagchha Maya - Director
- OMM (Oh My Man) - Director
