= Lalinie Gopal =

Minister of Sports and Youth Affairs
- Incumbent
- Assumed office 2025
- In office 2018–2020

Personal details
- Education: Anton de Kom University of Suriname

Lalinie Gopal is a Surinamese politician. She has been Minister of Sports and Youth Affairs since 2025, after previously serving from 2018 to 2020.

== Biography ==
Gopal completed her studies at the Anton de Kom University in Paramaribo and graduated with a Bachelor of Science. Subsequently, she continued her studies at the FHR School of Governance, which is also located in Paramaribo. Here, she completed her studies with a Master's degree in Public Administration. After her studies, she started working for the Ministry of Sports and Youth Affairs.

During one of President Bouterse's reshuffles, she joined the cabinet on 4 April 2018, as Minister of Sports and Youth Affairs.

In 2018, she severed direct contact with members of the National Youth Parliament (NJP). Due to the protracted impasse between the ministry and the NJP, Suriname missed out on the one-year chairmanship of the CARICOM youth.

During the 2025 Surinamese general election, she was number 21 on the list for the National Democratic Party (NDP). On 16 July 2025, she took office again as Minister of Sports and Youth Affairs.

In 2025, Gopal led the 110-member Surinamese delegation at the Inter-Guyanese Games (IGG) in Georgetown, Guyana. The games were considered a success, with Suriname being crowned overall champion.
