= Gopal Krishna =

Gopal Krishna may refer to:

- Gopala-Krishna, cow-protector form of the Hindu deity Krishna
- Gopal Krishna (1929 film), an Indian silent film
- Gopal Krishna (1938 film), a Bollywood film
- Gopal Krishna (1979 film), a Bollywood film
- Gopal Krishna (astronomer) (born 1947), Indian radio astronomer

== See also ==
- Gopalakrishnayya (disambiguation)
- "Gopala Krishna" (song), from the 1970 album All Things Must Pass by George Harrison
- Gopal Krishna Gokhale (1866–1915), Indian political leader and social reformer
- Gopalakrishnan, an Indian male given name
- Gopalakrishna Perumal Temple, Thirunangur, a Hindu temple in Tamil Nadu, India
- Gopalakrusna Pattanayaka, 18th-century Indian musician and composer
