= Ram Gopal (author) =

Indian writer and historian (born 1925)

Ram Gopal (born 10 January 1925) is an Indian writer and historian.

== Life and work ==
Ram Gopal was born on 10 January 1925. His biography of Lokmanya Tilak was considered by the press as 'an admirable history and authoritative and standard work'. Reviewing it The Times said: "it is extremely well done". His Indian Muslims – A Political History (1858–1947) also brought him high praises. Rushbrook Williams said reviewing it in International Affairs: "The author has taken the greatest possible pains to maintain impartiality, and his book is the product of much industrious research and is exceedingly well written".

He was also author of several books on civics and politics. For some time he did research for the Union Ministry of Education in the Board of the History of the Indian Freedom Movement.

Gopal was arrested in connection with the (August 1942) "Quit India" Movement and detained in Lucknow Central Jail. He worked in editorial position in prominent English language newspaper published from Allahabad in UP during his initial career. He was Member of Uttar Pradesh Legislative council.

== Works ==
=== English ===
- Lokmanya Tilak—A Biography
- Indian Muslims—A political Study (1858–1947)
- British Rule in India—An Assessment, Asia Publishing House, 1983
- Trails of Nehru
- How the British Occupied Bengal
- Linguistic Affairs of India
- Indo-Pakistan War and Peace
- How India Struggled for Freedom
- Man and Reason
- Spotlight on Democracy in India, Pustak Kendra, 1970
- India Under Indra
- Eight Leading Lights
- Indian Freedom Rhetorics & Realities
- Hindu culture during and after Muslim rule: survival and subsequent challenges. M.D. Publications Pvt. Ltd. 1994. ISBN 978-81-85880-26-6.
- Kalidasa: his art and culture. Concept Publishing Company. 1984.

https://catalog.loc.gov/vwebv/holdingsInfo?searchId=1757&recCount=25&recPointer=0&bibId=755993 https://catalog.loc.gov/vwebv/holdingsInfo?searchId=1788&recCount=25&recPointer=6&bibId=560577Indian ( Muslims, a political history, 1858–1947) https://catalog.loc.gov/vwebv/holdingsInfo?searchId=1757&recCount=25&recPointer=0&bibId=755993 (Linguistic affairs of India) https://catalog.loc.gov/vwebv/holdingsInfo?searchId=1839&recCount=25&recPointer=20&bibId=1698310 (Lokamanya Tilak: a biography) https://catalog.loc.gov/vwebv/holdingsInfo?searchId=1972&recCount=25&recPointer=87&bibId=8937110 (Svatantratā-pūrva Hindī ke saṅgharsha kā itihāsa) https://catalog.loc.gov/vwebv/holdingsInfo?searchId=1972&recCount=25&recPointer=89&bibId=8478868 (Man and reason) https://catalog.loc.gov/vwebv/holdingsInfo?searchId=1972&recCount=25&recPointer=90&bibId=8451345 (How the British occupied Bengal; a corrected account of the 1756-1765 events)

=== Hindi ===
- Bhartiya Raajneeti Victoriya se Nehru Tak
- Hindi ke sangharsh (Svatantratā-pūrva Hindī ke saṅgharsha kā itihāsa)https://catalog.loc.gov/vwebv/holdingsInfo?searchId=1972&recCount=25&recPointer=87&bibId=8937110
- Tapaswani
