= Balasubramanian Gopal =

Indian biologist (born 1970)

- Born: 31 August 1970 (age 56); India
- Education: Indian Institute of Technology, Kanpur; Indian Institute of Science; National Institute for Medical Research
- Known for: Studies on molecular biophysics
- Awards: 2010 National Bioscience Award for Career Development; 2015 Shanti Swarup Bhatnagar Prize
- Scientific career
- Fields: Molecular biophysics; Structural biology
- Workplaces: Indian Institute of Science; Torrent Pharmaceuticals

Balasubramanian Gopal (born 1970) is an Indian structural biologist, molecular biophysicist and a professor at the Molecular Biophysics Unit of the Indian Institute of Science. He is known for his studies on cell wall synthesis in Staphylococcus aureus and is an elected fellow of the National Academy of Sciences, India, Indian National Science Academy and the Indian Academy of Sciences. He received the National Bioscience Award for Career Development of the Department of Biotechnology in 2010. The Council of Scientific and Industrial Research, the apex agency of the Government of India for scientific research, awarded him the Shanti Swarup Bhatnagar Prize for Science and Technology, one of the highest Indian science awards, in 2015, for his contributions to biological sciences.

== Biography ==
Balasubramnian Gopal, born on 31 August 1970, completed his master's degree at Indian Institute of Technology, Kanpur and started his career as a biochemist by joining Torrent Pharmaceuticals at their Ahmedabad station. Later, he took a break from his job and joined the Indian Institute of Science (IISc) from where he secured a PhD. Moving to the UK, he did his post-doctoral studies in crystallography at the National Institute for Medical Research. Returning to India, he joined the Molecular Biophysics Unit of IISc as a member of Lab 301 where he and his colleagues are engaged in researches on structural and mechanistic aspects of membrane-associated proteins involved in inter-cell communication, transcriptional regulation and mediate antimicrobial resistance.

Gopal is known to have done considerable research in molecular biophysics and has contributed to widening our understanding of the cell wall synthesis in Staphylococcus aureus, a common gram-positive bacterium found in human respiratory tract and skin. He has published his research findings as articles in peer-reviewed journals (Note: Please see Selected bibliography section) and Google Scholar, an online article repository has listed 77 of them. He has delivered keynote addresses at several seminars including the Graduate Students' Meet 2007 and the 2nd International Conference on Structural and Functional Genomics organised by Sastra university, Tanjore in August 2016.

== Awards and honors ==
In 2025, he was awarded the Tata Transformation Prize in the Sustainability category. Department of Biotechnology awarded him the National Bioscience Award for Career Development in 2010. The Indian Academy of Sciences elected him as its fellow in 2013, the same year as he was elected as a fellow by the National Academy of Sciences, India. He was awarded the Shanti Swarup Bhatnagar Prize for Science and Technology, one of the highest Indian science awards, by the Council of Scientific and Industrial Research in 2015. The elected fellowship of the Indian National Science Academy reached him in 2016.

== Selected bibliography ==
- Krishan Gopal Thakur; T Praveena; B Gopal (April 2010). "Structural and biochemical bases for the redox sensitivity of Mycobacterium tuberculosis RslA". Journal of Molecular Biology. 397 (5): 1199–1208. doi:10.1016/j.jmb.2010.02.026. PMC 2877774. PMID 20184899.
- Vikas Navratna; Savitha Nadig; Varun Sood; K Prasad; Gayathri Arakere; B Gopal (January 2010). "Molecular basis for the role of Staphylococcus aureus penicillin binding protein 4 in antimicrobial resistance". Journal of Bacteriology. 192 (1): 134–144. doi:10.1128/JB.00822-09. PMC 2798245. PMID 19854906.
- Garima Agarwal; Malligarjunan Rajavel; Balasubramanian Gopal; Narayanaswamy Srinivasan (May 2009). "Structure-based phylogeny as a diagnostic for functional characterization of proteins with a cupin fold". PLOS ONE. 4 (5) e5736. Bibcode:2009PLoSO...4.5736A. doi:10.1371/journal.pone.0005736. PMC 2684688. PMID 19478949.
- Tavarekere S Girish; Eshita Sharma; B Gopal (August 2008). "Structural and functional characterization of Staphylococcus aureus dihydrodipicolinate synthase". FEBS Letters. 582 (19): 2923–2930. doi:10.1016/j.febslet.2008.07.035. PMID 18671976. S2CID 26217430.
- B Gopal; Lalima L Madan; Stephen F Betz; Anthony A Kossiakoff (January 2005). "The crystal structure of a quercetin 2, 3-dioxygenase from Bacillus subtilis suggests modulation of enzyme activity by a change in the metal ion at the active site (s)". Biochemistry. 44 (1): 193–201. doi:10.1021/bi0484421. PMID 15628860.
- B Gopal; Lesley F Haire; Steven J Gamblin; Eleanor J Dodson; Andrew N Lane; KG Papavinasasundaram; M Jo Colston; Guy Dodson (December 2001). "Crystal structure of the transcription elongation/anti-termination factor NusA from Mycobacterium tuberculosis at 1.7 Å resolution". Journal of Molecular Biology. 314 (5): 1087–1095. doi:10.1006/jmbi.2000.5144. PMID 11743725.
- B Gopal; CP Swaminathan; Sudha Bhattacharya; Alok Bhattacharya; MRN Murthy; A Surolia (September 1997). "Thermodynamics of metal ion binding and denaturation of a calcium binding protein from Entamoeba histolytica". Biochemistry. 36 (36): 10910–10916. doi:10.1021/bi9702546. PMID 9283081.

== See also ==
- Staphylococcus aureus
