= Gopal Das Shrestha =

- Occupations: Journalist, author

Gopal Das Shrestha (1930–1998) (Nepali: गॊपाल दास श्रेष्ठ), a prominent journalist, created the history of English journalism in Nepal. He published and edited the first English daily newspaper, The Commoner on 15 July 1956 from Kathmandu. He was an influential intellectual, a remarkable compelling writer and a creative thinker.

== Early years ==
Born on 21 May 1930 to a businessman Chandra Das Shrestha and Dwarika Devi Shrestha in Calcutta (Kolkata), the then capital city of colonial British India, Shrestha did his early schooling in Calcutta. When the World War II broke out in 1939, the family moved back to Nepal. He then completed his higher education in Nepal with merit from Juddhodaya high School (JP), Kathmandu.

== Freedom movement ==
While pursuing his intermediate level at Tri-chandra College, he was constantly inspired and motivated by the ongoing democratic movement taking place in the country against the autocratic Rana regime. This led Shrestha to participate in the freedom movement. He assisted the leading Nepali Rastriya (National) Congress (Nepali Congress Party) on several protest programs, awareness programs and mass meetings. When the then Rana regime banned Nepali Rastriya (National) Congress and declared illegal in April 1948, Shrestha along with the bunch of other senior coworkers namely Tripubar Singh Pradhan, Gopal Prasad Rimal and Bijaya Bahadur Malla formed a new party called 'Nepali Praja Panchyat ' on 12 October 1948. It organized a series of public meetings under the fundamental rights provisions of the constitution. But in spite of its legitimacy, the autocratic Rana regime suppressed its activities, suspecting a more serious design against them. Nepal Praja Panchyat then launched a Satyagraha movement in the three cities of Kathmandu Valley, demanding the implementation of the constitutional provisions relating to fundamental rights. Alarmed by this and its political connections with the earlier banned Rastriya Congress leaders, the Rana Government arrested hundreds of political suspects. At the age of just eighteen in late 1948, just few months after his marriage with Manorama Devi Shrestha, Shrestha was also arrested in the protest program at lalitpur, Patan and imprisoned. He was inhumanly beaten and tortured at times when he refused to co-operate with the ruthless authority. Later, in early 1951, the regime was forced to release him and his other political coworkers nearly after two and half years in the wake of the deepening gravity of the peoples' movement in and across the border. Soon after their release, in February 1951, one hundred and four years of autocratic regime was overthrown from the power. Democratic Nepal was finally established from a great sacrifice of the people and a long people's struggle. While he was still in prison, it is said that Shrestha was in the name list of twelve freedom fighters submitted by the prison authority to be exterminated for their active involvement in populist crusade.

== Entry to journalism ==
An honest advocate of democracy and civil rights, Shrestha continued his service long after democracy as an active worker of Nepali Congress and Nepal Praja Party. Working alongside the party, Shrestha was strongly drawn to journalism when he was briefly associated with the first Nepali Daily newspaper 'AWAJ' in 1951 published by the eminent poet Yugkabi, late Siddhicharan Shrestha. But it was only in 1956, when he finally embarked into the real world of journalism, leaving the politics behind for the rest of his life.

== First in Nepal ==
In July 1956, he launched The Commoner, Nepal's English pioneer daily, heralding an era of English language journalism in Nepal amidst several impediments during the initial period of democracy. Shortly after two years of publication, in 1958, he was invited by the United States government, the Department of State to attend a study-work-travel program from a prestigious Medill School of Journalism, Northern Western University, Illinois. He was the first ever Nepali journalist to study, live and trained in the United States under US government funding. As a part of his training program, he worked with some newspapers, namely, New York Daily News, Baltimore Post and Washington Times. He further undertook another training program in United Kingdom, working briefly with London Times

== Active life in journalism ==
Apart from the regular publication of English daily newspaper The Commoner, he published and edited other Nepali Vernacular dailies and weeklies like Janata Daily, Nepal Times Daily (Hindi edition), and Yugdoot (weekly) as sister publications at various times and later Prajatantra weekly and so on. Through these publications, he was able to inform and win the hearts and minds of the people. He also contributed thought-provoking articles and editorials to other vernacular dailies and weeklies including Samaj (published and edited by Mani Raj Upadhyaya) and Samikshha (published and edited by Madan Mani Dixit) on regular basis. He is believed to be the first journalist who is very immaculate and an eloquent writer who wrote in native (Nepali) and English language equally well. He is the journalist who strictly practiced ethics of journalism in Nepal and became a role model to modern journalism. Contemporary journalists, political leaders, ministers and other high-profile officials sought his ideas, visions and remarks whenever they need them whether in the time crisis or in political deadlocks.

== Achievements and contributions ==
In his forty-five years of illustrious and professional career, Shrestha held several media dignitary positions and played a key role in the gradual evolution of media from restrictive to the 'free press' of today. He was the founder member of Nepal's first Press Committee in 1957. He became the President of Nepal Journalists’ Association twice in late 1959 and again in 1970, founder President of Nepal Press Institute, the first training center for the journalists in Nepal from 1984 to 1997, President of Press Club and later chairman of Press Council of Nepal in 1995. Serving as the head of different media bodies and a member of first press committee and Royal Press Commission, he made an important contribution to the formulation of press code of conduct in Nepal that strengthened the professional development of journalism in the country. He was always conscious of the fact that the Nepalese journalism needed a sustainable development program to attract and retain the people in the profession. When he was the chairman of Nepal Press Council in 1995, Media Development Fund was formed in his initiation which facilitated the small media operators, particularly operating outside the capital city with soft loans which in turn enabled them to sustain professionally. He is the person who first envisaged the need and development of the Media Village in the country for the institutionalized growth of media sector. Apart from that, he unveiled several plans and proposals to uplift the dwindling media sectors during his time but unfortunately, that could not be materialized due to various limitations and hindrances.

Besides, his countless mind gripping editorials and articles were printed in various national and international print media. He has also translated and edited several books and articles that include the translation of autobiographical book "The Confessions"(Devanagari:कन्फेसन्स) by Jean-Jacques Rousseau in Nepali language published by Nepal Academy in 1973.

== Honours ==
As a token of appreciation for his contribution to Nepalese society, the then late King Birendra nominated him as a distinguished member of Tribhuvan University Academic Council twice(the only one university at that time). In 1997, he was nominated as member of Raj Parishad (upper house during kingship). He was also decorated with Gorkha Dakshin Bahu (II and IV class) and Subikhayat Trishakti Patta II medal, the highest honors presented and honoured by the King for the distinguished contribution to the country in the field of arts, literature, sports, science, and Social service.

In 1999, the Press Council of Nepal created a journalism award in honor of Shrestha, the "Gopal Das Journalism Award" for his contribution to the development of journalism in Nepal since 1951. This award is presented annually to an exceptional journalist who have contributed and practiced good ethics of journalism in the country. It carries a purse of Rs. 100000 and a letter of appreciation. On 23 September 2003, Nepal's Postal Services Department issued a commemorative postage stamp bearing a picture of Shrestha. The then Prime Minister Surya Bahadur Thapa affixed the first day cancellation mark on his stamp. This was for the first time in Nepal that a postage stamp has been issued to commemorate a journalist honoring the fourth estate of the country.

Shrestha died 4 November 1998 at the age of 68 while still serving as the president of Press Council of Nepal.
