= Gopal Gupta (philosopher) =

Indian philosopher

Philosophical work
- Era: 21st-century philosophy
- Region: Western philosophy
- School: Analytic
- Institutions: Aurora University, University of Evansville
- Main interests: ethical theory

Gopal Gupta is an Indian philosopher and Joe Dunham Distinguished Professor of Ethics at Aurora University. Previously, he was a professor of philosophy and religion at the University of Evansville. Gupta is the editor-in-chief of the Journal of Hindu-Christian Studies (JHCS).

== Books ==
- Māyā in the Bhāgavata Purāna: Human Suffering and Divine Play, Oxford University Press 2020
