= Gopal Gupta (computer scientist) =

American computer scientist

- Scientific career
- Fields: Computer science, programming languages, software engineering, artificial intelligence, human–computer interaction
- Workplaces: University of Texas at Dallas
- Website: Gopal Gupta

Gopal Gupta is the Erik Jonsson Professor and former head of the Department of Computer Science at the University of Texas at Dallas. Currently, co-director of the Center for Applied AI and Machine Learning.

== Education ==
Gupta received a B.Tech. degree in computer science from the Indian Institute of Technology, Kanpur, India in 1985. He received an M.S. degree in computer science from The University of North Carolina, Chapel Hill in 1987. He also has a Ph.D. degree in computer science from The University of North Carolina, Chapel Hill, in 1991.

== Career ==
Gupta has worked in the field of logic programming since 1987. From 1989 to 1991, he worked as a Research Associate at the University of Bristol in the research group of David H.D. Warren. Subsequently, he was a faculty member in the Computer Science Department at New Mexico State University. Since 2000 he has been a faculty member at the University of Texas at Dallas, where he served as the Computer Science Department Head from 2009 to 2020. He is also the co-founder and co-director of the UT Dallas Center for Applied AI and Machine Learning. He co-founded Interoperate.biz, Inc to automate porting of legacy codes into modern languages using logic programming.

== Innovations ==
Gopal Gupta has founded two companies based on his logic programming research. His group invented the Stack Splitting Method for parallelizing search in a scalable manner on distributed machines as well as a method for implementing tabled logic programming systems by dynamically reordering alternatives. He proposed Horn Logic Denotations as a means for specifying the semantics of programming languages as well as for rapidly implementing them. The technique is particularly suited for rapidly specifying and implementing domain specific languages. The technology has been put to commercial use. His group discovered coinductive logic programming (coLP), which subsequently led to s(CASP), a logic-programming-based automated reasoning system. His group’s work on coLP received the 10-year test-of-time award at the 2016 ICLP conference. The s(CASP) system is a powerful LP system that can emulate human thinking. Many innovative applications have been developed by various groups using the s(CASP) system, e.g., automating medical treatment advising, automated legal reasoning, validation of system requirements, and system assurance.

More recently, Prof. Gopal Gupta and his research group have developed techniques that use Large language models to extract specific relevant data, or knowledge, which is then processed by a back-end reasoning engine that his team has built. A back-end reasoning engine operates on a server and processes complex data using programmed rules and logic to make deductions.

== Logical Thinking education ==
Gupta has been teaching LP summer camps to high school students since 2022. He has organized several logic programming hackathons since 2016 to promote logical reasoning. In the 90s, he worked on using Prolog as an introductory programming language for 1st year CS students. Currently, he is developing tools using the s(CASP) system for teaching computational thinking to people of all ages.

== Awards and honors ==
- Co-chair, Prolog Education Group.
- President, Association for Logic Programming, 2010–2014.
- Computer science outstanding teacher of the year, University of Texas at Dallas, 2008.
- Best paper award. European Conferences on Web Services 2005
- 10-year Test-of-Time Award. International Conference on Logic Programming 2016
