= Gopa Rashtra =

Inscriptions indicate the presence of a region by this name in the Chalukya empire (present day Maharashtra and Goa). Kautilya states that the region was tribal corporation following the profession of agriculture and arms both. According to Mahabharata's list of kingdoms given in Bhishma Parva, chapter-9, Pandu Rashtra, Gopa Rashtra, Malla Rashtra and Ashmaka together formed the modern Maharashtra. The term Goa is derived from Goparashtra i.e. the area of Yadavas. The origin of the city name Goa is unclear. In ancient literature, Goa was known by many names, such as Gomanchala, Gopakapattana, Gopakapattam, Gopakapuri, Govapuri, Govem, and Gomantak.

== History ==
The name of Gopa rashtra forms part among the various kingdoms of Ancient India as narrated in the epic Mahabharata.

The state of Goa is described as ancient Goparashtra and it takes its present name from earlier used terms like- Gomant, Gomantaka, Govarashtra or Goparashtra. All these names are prefixed with "Go" means "cow". Mahabharata refers it to as the country of cowherds.

Inscriptions of Chalukya age mention about grant of Balegrama village in the Goparashtra to worship Kapaleshvara.

== See also ==
- Kingdoms of Ancient India
