= Ancient institutions of learning in the Indian subcontinent =

The Indian subcontinent has a long history of education and learning from the era of Indus Valley Civilization. Important ancient institutions of learning in ancient India are Takshashila, Kashmir Smast, Nalanda, Valabhi, Pushpagiri, Odantapuri, Vikramashila, Somapura, Bikrampur, Jagaddala.

== Takshashila or Taxila ==
First university

The University of ancient Taxila was a renowned ancient institute of higher-learning located in the city of Taxila, Pothohar region of Punjab, Pakistan. Located in the Taxila Tehsil of Rawalpindi District, it lies approximately 25 kilometres (16 mi) northwest of the Islamabad–Rawalpindi metropolitan area and is just south of the Haripur District of Khyber Pakhtunkhwa. According to scattered references that were only fixed a millennium later, it may have dated back to at least the fifth century BC. Some scholars date Takshashila's existence back to the sixth century BC. The school consisted of several monasteries without large dormitories or lecture halls where the instruction was most likely still provided on an individualistic basis.

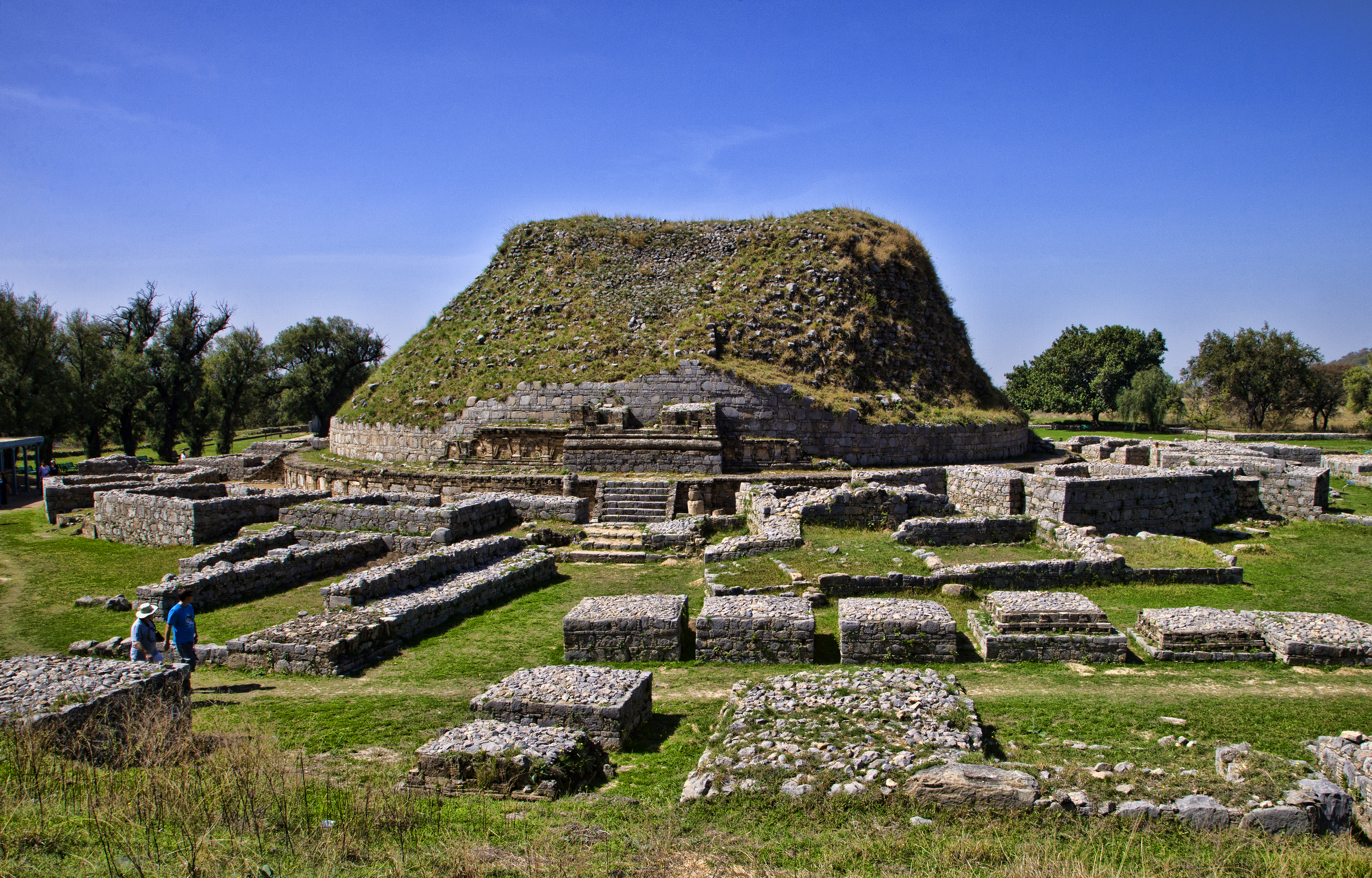
Ruins of University of Taxila

Takshashila is described in some detail in later Jātaka tales, written in Sri Lanka around the fifth century AD.

It became a noted centre of learning at least several centuries BC, and continued to attract students until the destruction of the city in the fifth century AD.

=== Important teachers ===
Important teachers that are said to be teaching at university of Taxila include;

- Pāṇini, the great 5th century BCE Indian grammarian
- Kumāralāta, according to the 3rd century Chinese Buddhist monk and traveller Yuan Chwang, Kumāralāta, the founder of Sautrāntika school.
- Vasubandhu, the founder of Tibetan Buddhism is said to be teaching there. His famous pupil includes Dharmakirti and Dignaga.

=== Important students ===
Important pupil from ancient University of Taxila includes;

- King Pasenadi of Kosala, a close friend of the Buddha.
- Jivaka, court doctor at Rajagriha and personal doctor of the Buddha.
- Charaka, the Indian "father of medicine" and one of the leading authorities in Ayurveda, is also said to have studied at Taxila, and practiced there.

== Somapura Mahavihara ==
Somapura Mahavihara in Paharpur, Badalgachhi Upazila, Naogaon District, Bangladesh is among the best known viharas, monasteries, in the Indian subcontinent and is one of the most important archaeological sites in the country. It was one of the largest residential university in ancient India. It was designated as a UNESCO World Heritage Site in 1985. It is one of the most famous examples of architecture in pre-Islamic Bangladesh. It dates from a period to the nearby Halud Vihara and to the Sitakot Vihara in Nawabganj Upazila of Dinajpur District.

== Nalanda ==
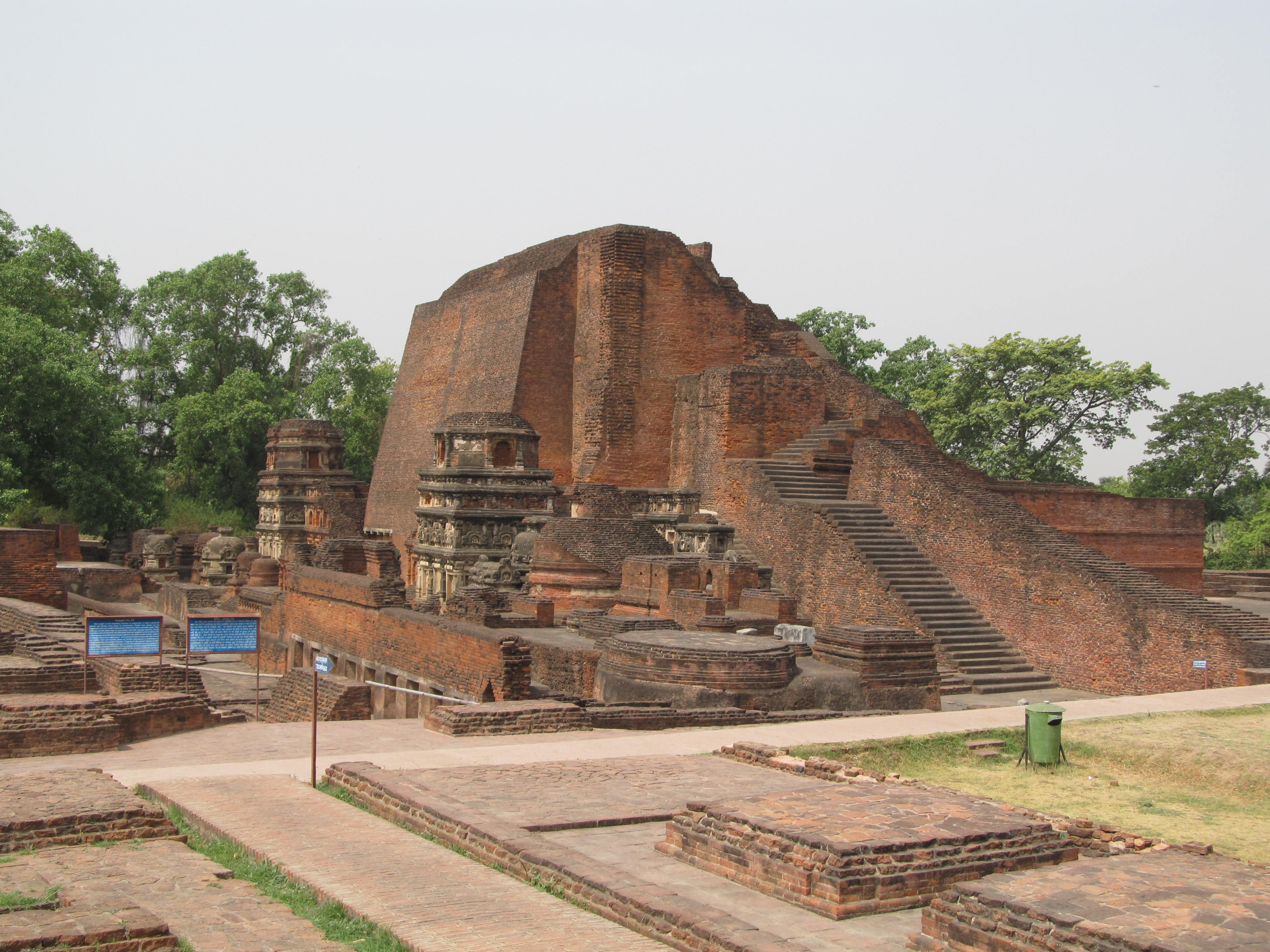
Nalanda University ruins

Nalanda (Pali: नालंंदा) was an ancient Buddhist Mahavihara, a revered university which served as a renowned centre of learning, in the ancient kingdom of Magadha (modern-day Bihar) in India. The university of Nalanda obtained significant fame, prestige and relevance during ancient times, and rose to legendary status due to its contribution to the emergence of India as a great power around the fourth century. The site is located about 95 kilometres (59 mi) southeast of Patna, and was one of the greatest centres of learning in the world from the fifth century CE to c. 1200 CE. Today, it is a UNESCO World Heritage Site.

== Valabhi University ==
The Valabhi University was an important centre of Buddhist learning and championed the cause of Hinayana Buddhism between 600 CE and 1200 CE. Valabhi was the capital of the Maitraka empire during the period 480-775 CE. It was an important port for international trade located in Saurashtra, present day it is called Vallabhipur located in Bhavnagar district of Gujarat in western India, identical with the old state of Vala. For some time, the university was considered to be a rival to Nalanda, in Bihar, in the field of education. In September 2017, the Indian central government started to consider a proposal to revive the ancient university.

== Sharada Peeth ==
Sharada Peeth is a ruined Hindu temple and ancient centre of learning located in present-day Pakistan-administered Jammu and Kashmir. Between the 6th and 12th centuries CE, it was among the most prominent temple universities in the Indian subcontinent. Known in particular for its library, stories recount scholars travelling long distances to access its texts. It played a key role in the development and popularisation of the Sharada script in North India.

=== Library at Sharada Peeth ===
Sharada Peeth was also valued by scholars across the Indian subcontinent for its library, and stories detail long journeys they would take to consult it.

- In the 11th century, the Vaishnava saint Swami Ramanuja traveled from Srirangam to Sharada Peeth to refer to the Brahma Sutras, before commencing work on writing his commentary on the Brahma sutras, the Sri Bhasya.

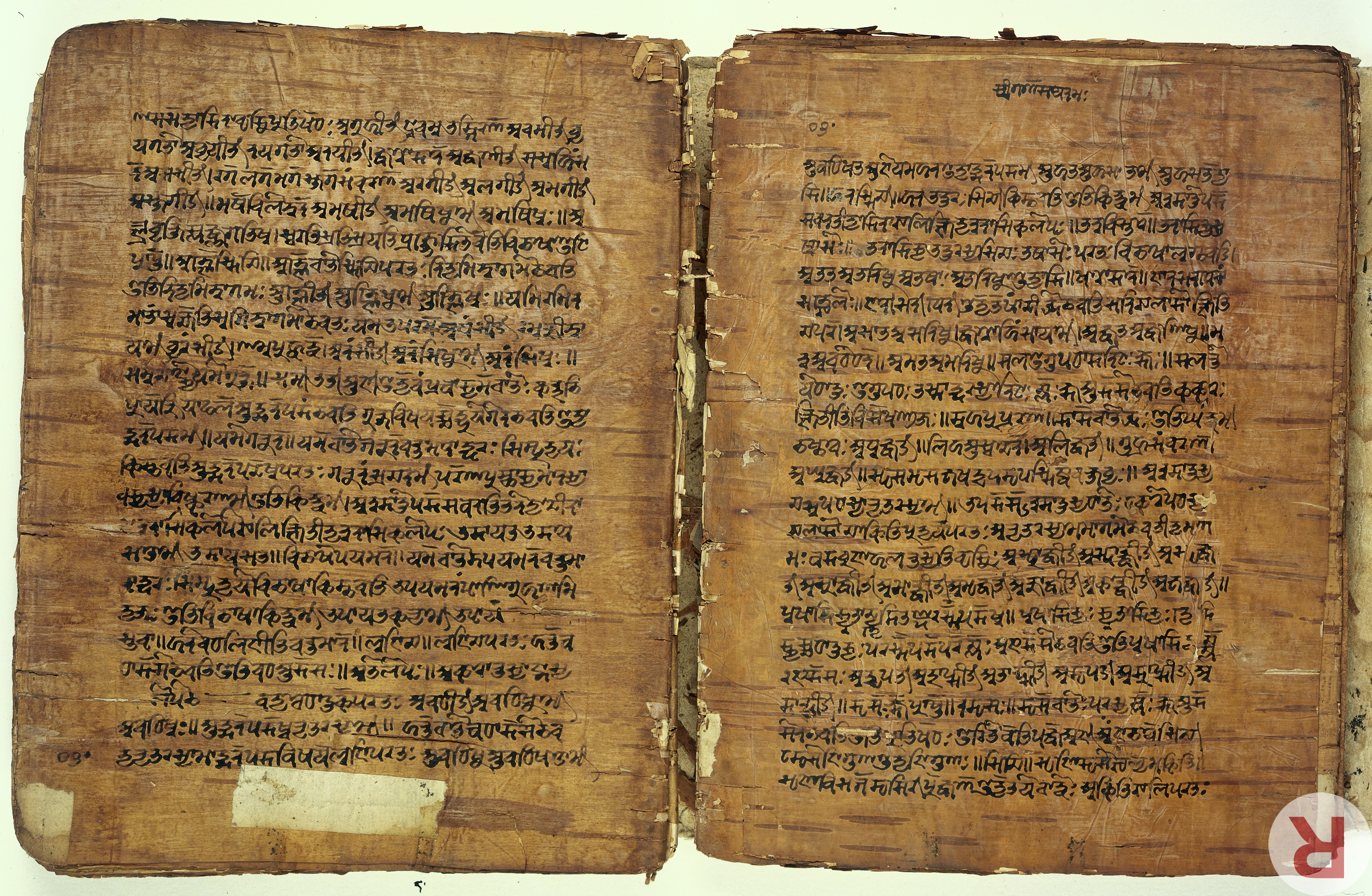
17th-century birch bark manuscript of Pāṇini's grammar treatise from Sharada Peeth

- The 13th century CE (1277 – 78) text Prabhāvakacarita contains a story of the Śvētāmbara scholar Hemachandra. As Sharada Peeth was the only place with a library known to have all such works available in their complete form, Hemachandra requested King Jayasimha Siddharaja to send a team to retrieve copies of the existing eight Sanskrit grammatical texts preserved there. These supported his own text of Sanskrit grammar, the Siddha-Hema-Śabdanuśāśana.

=== Important students ===
The important pupil who studied here include:

- Vaṭeśvara, a tenth century Indian mathematician who presented several trigonometric identities. He was the author of Vaṭeśvara-siddhānta written in 904 AD, a treatise focusing on astronomy and applied mathematics.
- Kumarajiva (344 – 413 CE) was born to a Kashmiri father, Kumārāyana, and a Chinese mother from Kucha. He was sent to Kashmir at a young age to gain a grounding in Buddhism, where he studied under a Kashmiri scholar of the Sarvastivada school.
- Rinchen Zangpo, a principal lotsawa or translator of Sanskrit Buddhist texts into Tibetan, is also said to be studied here.

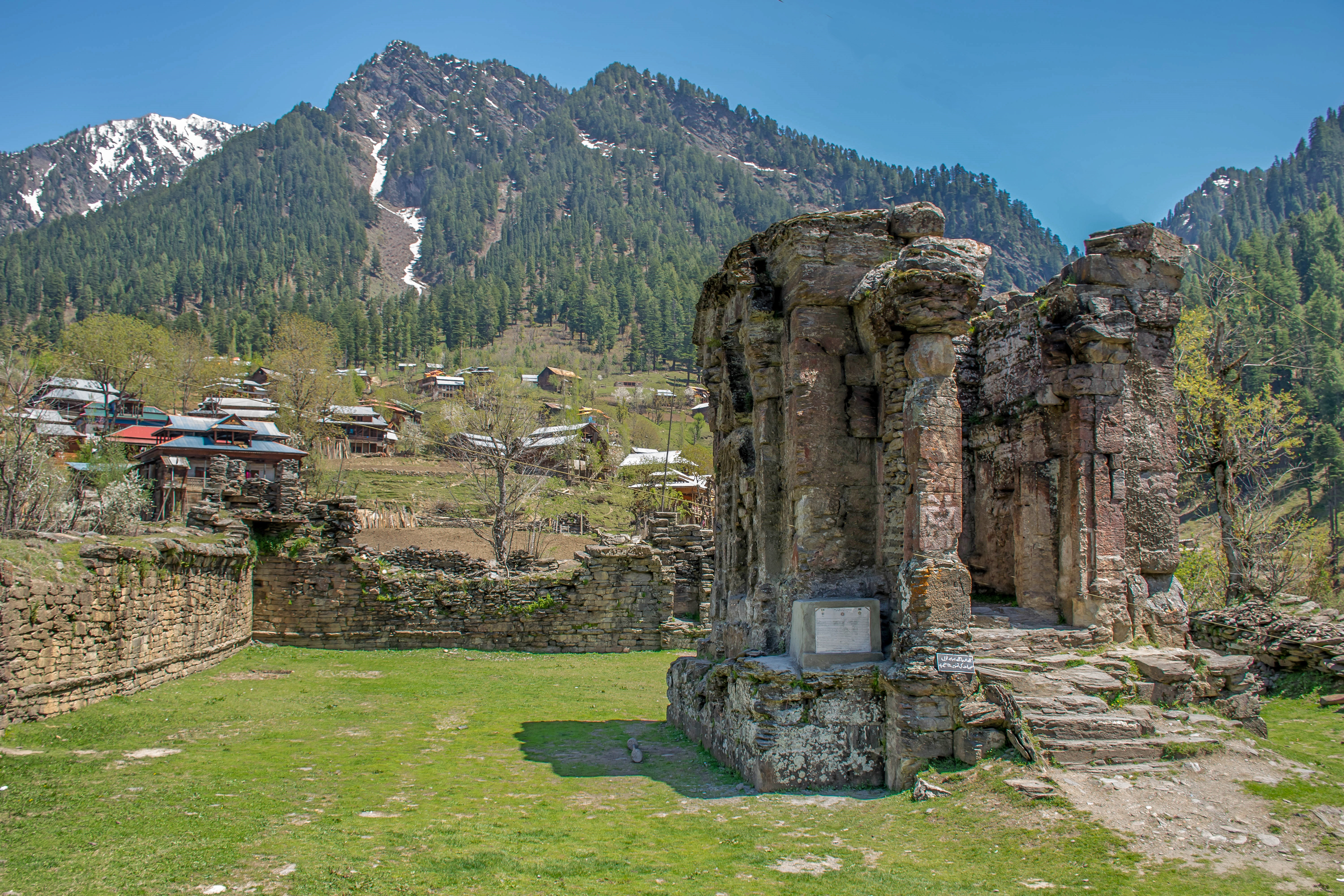
Ruins of Sharada Peeth

- The Kashmiri historian Kalhana Pandit
- Hindu philosopher Adi Shankara.

== Pushpagiri Vihara ==
Pushpagiri (Odia: ପୁଷ୍ପଗିରି) was an ancient Buddhist mahavihara or monastic complex located atop Langudi Hill (or Hills) in Jajpur district of Odisha, India. Pushpagiri was mentioned in the writings of the Chinese traveller Xuanzang (c. 602 – c. 664) and some other ancient sources. Until the 1990s, it was hypothesised to be one or all of the Lalitgiri-Ratnagiri-Udayagiri group of monastic sites, also located in Jajpur district. These sites contain ruins of many buildings, stupas of various sizes, sculptures (many now removed to museums), and other artifacts.

However, archaeological excavations conducted at Langudi Hills during 1996-2006 resulted in the discovery of another site, with inscriptions describing the local monastery as puṣpa sabhar giriya, and identified by the excavators as Pushpagiri. This has now become the general view among scholars. The site has now been made accessible for tourism.

The visit of Xuanzang indicates that Pushpagiri was an important Buddhist site in ancient India. Along with Nalanda, Vikramashila, Odantapuri, Takshashila and Vallabhi, it is believed to be a major ancient centre of learning. It flourished between 3rd and 11th centuries CE.

== Odantapuri University ==
Odantapuri (also called Odantapura or Uddandapura) was a prominent Buddhist Mahavihara in what is now Bihar, India. It is believed to have been established by Gopala I in the 8th century. It is considered the second oldest of India's Mahaviharas after Nalanda University and was situated in Magadha.

== Vikramashila ==
Vikramashila (Sanskrit: विक्रमशिला) was one of the two most important centres of learning in India during the Pala Empire, along with Nalanda. Its location is now the site of Antichak village, Bhagalpur district in Bihar.

Vikramashila was established by the Pala emperor Dharmapala (783 to 820 AD) in response to a supposed decline in the quality of scholarship at Nalanda. Atiśa, the renowned pandita, is sometimes listed as a notable abbot. It was destroyed by the forces of Muhammad bin Bakhtiyar Khalji around 1193.

== Bikrampur Vihara ==
Bikrampur Vihara is an ancient Buddhist vihara at Raghurampur village, Bikrampur, Munshiganj District, Dhaka Division in Bangladesh.

== Jagaddala Mahavihara ==
Jagaddala Mahavihara (fl. late 11th century - mid-12th century) was a Buddhist monastery and seat of learning in Varendra, a geographical unit in present north Bengal in Bangladesh. It was founded by the later kings of the Pāla dynasty, probably Ramapala (c. 1077–1120), most likely at a site near the present village of Jagdal in Dhamoirhat Upazila in the north-west Bangladesh on the border with India, near Paharapur. Some texts also spell the name Jaggadala.

== Other ==
Further centres include Telhara in Bihar (probably older than Nalanda), Kanchipuram, in Tamil Nadu, Manyakheta, in Karnataka, Ujjain in Madhya Pradesh Nagarjunakonda, in Andhra Pradesh, Varanasi in Uttar Pradesh (eighth century to modern times),Abhayagiri Vihāra, and Jetavanaramaya, in Sri Lanka.

== See also ==
- Indus Valley Civilization
- Hinduism
- Buddhism
- Jainism
