= List of oldest higher-learning institutions =

Advanced education in the ancient world

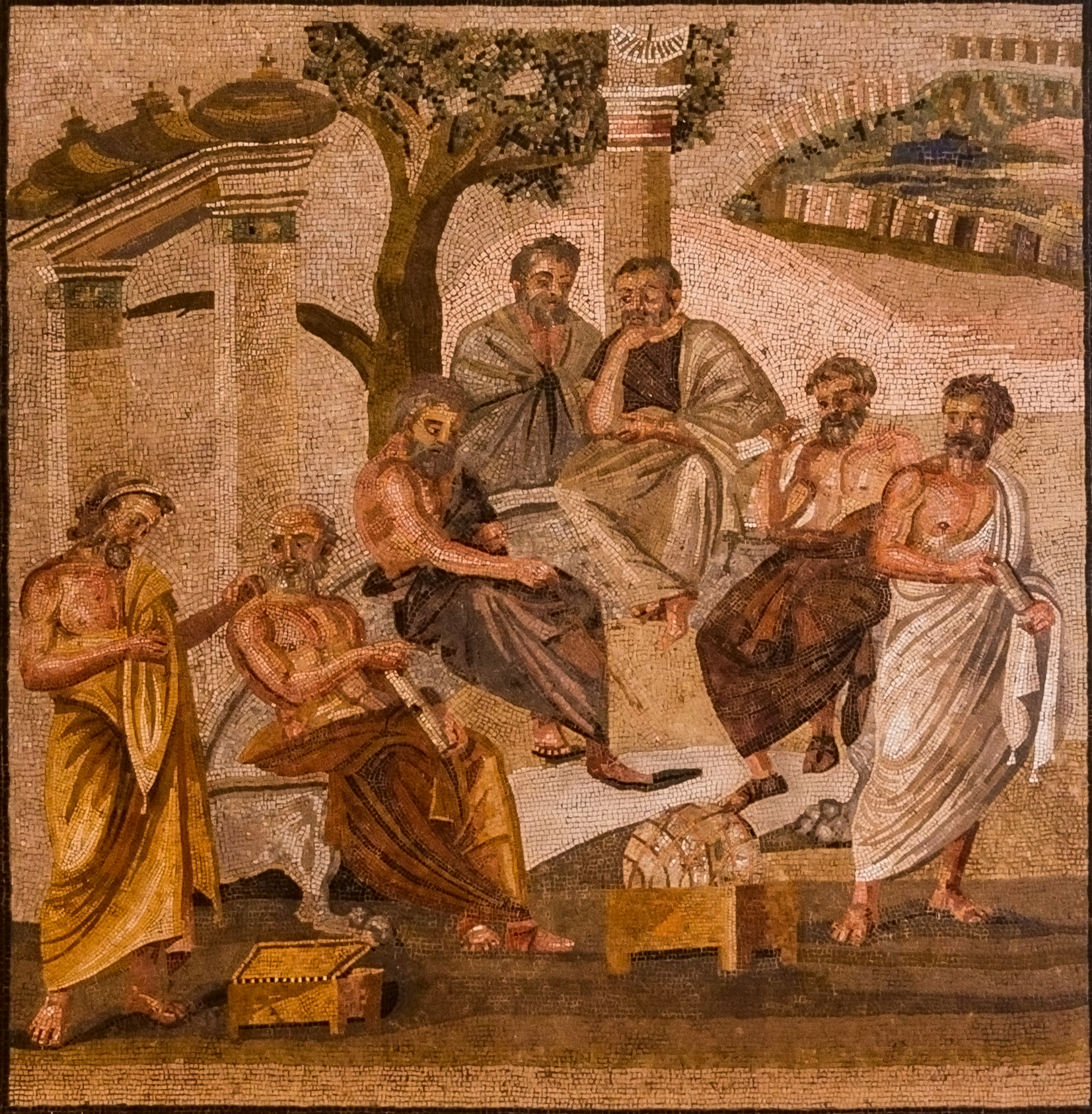
Mosaic from Pompeii (1st c. BC) depicting Plato's Academy

A variety of ancient higher-learning institutions were developed in many cultures to provide institutional frameworks for scholarly activities. These ancient centres were sponsored and overseen by courts; by religious institutions, which sponsored cathedral schools, monastic schools, and madrasas; by scientific institutions, such as museums, hospitals, and observatories; and by certain scholars. They are distinct from the Western-style university, an autonomous organization of scholars that originated in medieval Europe and have been adopted in other regions in modern times (see List of oldest universities in continuous operation).

== Still existing ==
Year	University	Location		Notes
Year	University	Original	Current	Notes
ca. 1040-1147 (Note: records only attest its development into a higher-education institution via Almoravid dynasty (1040-1147))	University of al-Qarawiyyin	Almoravid dynasty	Morocco	The university's curriculum included but was not limited to Quranic exegesis (tafsir), Islamic jurisprudence, algebra, astronomy, botany, cartography and geography, grammar, history, literature, logic, mathematics, medicine, philosophy, physics and a host of foreign languages including Greek and Latin. Notably, the mosque complex also thrived as a spiritual centre where Islamic mysticism (Sufism) and gnosis (irfan) thrived. Traditionally, the students were boys and men, but girls and women who were interested in learning were provided with spaces in a special gallery (riwaq) that overlooked the students’ circle and from where they could listen to the discussion and write questions on paper to be sent to the teacher and on showing an interest would receive individual tuition. Fatima al-Fihriya is said to have studied Islamic Jurisprudence and mathematics at her own institution.
ca. 14th century (Note: there exist no records of institutional education in Ez-Zitouna before the 14th century)	University of Ez-Zitouna	Hafsid dynasty	Tunisia	The system of teaching, in its organisational principles, methods used and subjects of courses, was similar to that of other Islamic mosques. Attendance was voluntary and students followed the courses of the monasters of their own choice. The rhythm of teaching was rather relaxed, with weekly holidays on Thursdays and Fridays, periods of leave, the Muslim festivals and, probably, no courses in the summer. There were no examinations, but certificates of ijazah attesting the following of a course and authorisation to teach it in turn.
1398	Soŋgyoongwan	Joson Kingdom	South Korea	It was included in the city development plans of Sowool when the Joson Dynasty were building the new capital and construction officially began in 1395 across three years whence 大聖殿·東廡·西廡·Temple of Confucius·明倫堂·東齋·西齋·正錄所·養賢庫 and cafeteria were completed. 文廟碑文 inscriptions from 1410 assert the buildings together were circa 935.68m² in area. 尊經閣 were the institution library, 養賢庫 managed student financial aid and 正錄廳 supervised the entrance exams as well as recruitment and management of faculty staff. 東齋 and 西齋 were dormitories for students and 泮村 (student village) were later established as student quota were gradually increased. The original quota were exactly 100 but this increased to 150, and then again to 200 in 1429. Originally, 生員試 were the only entrance exam, testing one's understanding of Confucian scriptures, but 進士試 were later concurrently conducted in 1435 that tested one's literary composition and it were custom to accept 100 students each. Students had to sign the 到記 in the cafeteria every breakfast and supper and together they were counted as one 圓點, or points, and 300 points were required to take 館試 that recruited government officials. Students also composed literary works thrice a month that were graded and whereupon provided individual guidance by tutors who suspended their lectures for a day. It's specified in 都評議使司 from 1392 that Soŋgyoongwan sought to train the next generation of tutors, statesmen, wordsmiths, men of law, mathematicians, generals, military logisticians, astronomers, cartographers, fortune-tellers and medical practitioners. Although Soŋgyoongwan were royally administered, students customarily practiced civil disobedience wherein the most popular were 捲堂: students would refuse in conjunction to enter the cafeteria, voluntarily losing critical attendance points necessary to take the civil service exams, throwing the administration in jeopardy of paralysis.
1453	Istanbul University	Ottoman Empire	Turkey	Immediately after the conquest of Constantinople, Sultan Mehmed the Conqueror appointed Zeyrek Mehmet Efendi as a professor at the madrasa established in the Pantokrator Monastery. In subsequent years, this madrasa became known as the Zeyrek Madrasa, and the neighbourhood where it was located also came to be called Zeyrek. Sultan Mehmed the Conqueror occasionally visited the Zeyrek Madrasa to personally listen to the lessons and discussions. Today, the building continues to serve as the Zeyrek Mosque. The other building used as a madrasa became Hagia Sophia whence Sultan Mehmed the Conqueror appointed his teacher Molla Hüsrev as professor of the madrasa. Istanbul University was initially founded in the Zeyrek and Hagia Sophia madrasas and provided education in these locations for 18 years till the construction of the Fatih Complex, named after the person who built them. The complex included a mosque, eight madrasahs, Tetimme, a library, a Dar al-Muwaqqit, the bimaristan called Darüşşifa, a tabhane, a hammam, a cafeteria, shops as well as a caravanserai beneath the building. With a student population of a thousand, they also received daily allowances. Whilst Theology, Law, Literature, Mathematics and Astronomy were taught at the Sahn-ı Seman Medrese, Medicine was provided at the Darüşşifa, which was the largest hospital of its time with 70 wards. The tutors of the Zeyrek and Hagia Sophia madrasahs were thereupon transferred over in 1470. Of the many famous scholars hired, the head of the Samarkand Observatory in Hagia Sophia Madrasa, Ali Qushji, is one good example.
ca. 1516-1517	Al-Azhar University	Ottoman Empire	Egypt	Under the Ottoman Caliphate, there was little interference from Istanbul in the affairs of Al-Azhar. The Egyptian ulama held important positions in the university, including the position of Shaykh Al-Azhar. Since the Ottoman Empire follows the Hanafi school of jurisprudence, the Al-Azhar leadership was rotated between the Shafie and Maliki schools of law. The main duties of the Shaykh of Al-Azhar were to oversee the running of the Al-Azhar mosque and the administration of the Al-Azhar University.
1639	Ryukoku University	Tokugawa shogunate	Japan	
1790	University of Tokyo	Tokugawa shogunate	Japan	In 1684, Tenmongata were established as an institute for astronomical studies wherein Banshowagegyou were later established as an individual branch in 1811 that specialised in translating and studying Western books. Meanwhile, Shōhei-zaka Gakumonjo were established in Yushima Seidō in 1790 as a Confucian academy and became state-sponsored in 1797. Banshowagegyou were later expanded into Yogakusho in 1855 to teach Rangaku, then renamed to Bansho Shirabesho, then Yōsho shirabesho, then Kaiseijor, then Kaisei gakkō. Koishikawa Yojosho were established as a Western medicine school in 1861 and eventually merged with Shōhei-zaka Gakumonjo and Kaisei gakkō in 1869. This institution were officially restructured into a Western university system in 1877 renamed as the Tokyo University.

== BC ==
Year	University	Location		Notes
Year	University	Original	Current	Notes
ca. 2246–2152	Per Ânkh𓉑	Old Kingdom of Egypt	Egypt	It was located within the Egyptian temple usually taking the form of huge campuses: with many buildings and thousands of employees, as well as fulfilling some of the roles of higher education institutions.
ca. 6th century	University of ancient Taxila	Maurya Empire	Pakistan	In its early days, Taxila was a great centre of learning and was well known for its university where the arts and sciences of the day were taught. It attracted students from different and distant parts of the Indian subcontinent and elsewhere. The innumerable monastic establishments where the "world-renowned" teachers lived and imparted knowledge could be taken as the component parts of a great and sprawling university which covered an area of more than 26 square miles in the valley of the Haro. Early Buddhist literature refers to the students as going to Taxila to "complete" their education and not to begin it. They were invariably sent at the age of sixteen, that is, when they "came of age." This shows that Taxila was a seat of higher learning, not of elementary education. Soon after the departure of Alexander the Great from the scene, Taxila was incorporated into the Mauryan Empire, and it was during the days of Ashoka that Taxila rose to a pre-eminent position among the cities of the north-west. A number of monasteries and stupa were built in and around Taxila, and their remains bear testimony to the days when Buddhism was the prevailing faith. With the break-up of the Mauryan Empire, Taxila appears to have lost its importance, and its history becomes chequered.
387	Platonic Academy	Classical Athens	Greece	Legally, the school was a corporate body organized for worship of the Muses. The scholarch was elected for life by a majority vote of the members. Most scholars infer, mainly from Plato’s writings, that instruction originally included mathematics, dialectic, natural science and preparation for statesmanship. The Academy philosophically underwent various phases, as: the Old Academy, under Plato and his immediate successors as scholarchs, when the philosophic thought there was moral, speculative, and dogmatic; the Middle Academy, begun by Arcesilaus, who introduced a nondogmatic scepticism; the New Academy, founded by Carneades, which ended with the scholarch Antiochus of Ascalon, who effected a return to the dogmatism of the Old Academy. Thereafter the Academy was a centre of Middle Platonism and Neoplatonism until 529, when the emperor Justinian I closed it, together with the other pagan schools.
ca. 375-357 (Note: records only attest its creation via Duke Huan of Tian Qi (375-357 BC))	Jixia Academy	Qi	China	The academy was founded by Duke Huan of Tian Qi and took its name from its position outside the western gates of Linzi. King Wei of Qi thereafter developed the academy and bolstered the student population to nearly one thousand, as well as hiring 76 scholars whereupon he gave them the ranking of High Taifu. Unlike the public schools in the Western Zhou Dynasty, the Jixia Academy was multifunctional and engaged in education, academic research and political consultation. Although it was established by the government, it dissolved the hierarchical system of aristocracy wherein tutors were hired without discrimination based on social status, even those born into slavery. The Jixia Academy thrived until the reign of King Min of Qi. In 284 BC, it was scattered by Yan's sack of Linzi.
335	Peripatetic school	Classical Athens	Greece	Aristotle established his own school in a sanctuary dedicated to Apollo just outside the city boundary of Athens known as the Lyceum. He built a substantial library and visiting sophists lectured there. As in other similar places, there were ‘walks’ (peripatoi) and the name ‘Peripatos’ stuck. As a result of the sophistic movement, the Lyceum, the Academy, as well as other public and private buildings in Athens, were serving as places where some form of education beyond the elementary might be obtained for a price. By the last quarter of the fifth century B.C, the sophists had developed something very close to institutions for secondary education at Athens. The Lyceum was not however a private club like the Academy; many of the lectures there were open to the general public and given free of charge. The school was originally, perhaps always, a collection of people rather than a building: Aristotle, a non-Athenian with the status of metic, could not own property. His successor Theophrastus could and did, and he bequeathed real estate and a library to a group of his students, including Strato of Lampsacus who was then elected scholarch. Strato was succeeded by Lyco of Troas, Lyco by Aristo of Ceos, who was scholarch until c.a. 190. After that the succession is obscure, but there is evidence of continuous philosophical activity until the first century BC when Athens was captured by Sulla and the Peripatetic library removed to Rome.
ca. 295	Mouseion	Ptolemaic Kingdom	Egypt	Mouseion was the greatest and most significant temple to the Muses ever constructed. The Mouseion was a collection of scholars from many different parts of the Hellenistic world and practiced many different schools of thought. When Ptolemy I Soter was first establishing his Mouseion, he wanted to make sure that the scholars would be enticed to reside in his new city. The resident community of scientists and thinkers in Alexandria thus led enviable lives. They were showered with free meals, high salaries, pleasant surroundings, good lodgings and servants. These scholars were also exempt from paying any taxes. The noted physician in Alexandria, Herophilos, was famous for his vivisection of prisoners in order to study anatomy. He would not have been able to carry out this study without the compliance of the Ptolemaic dynasty; he needed someone to legally provide him with subjects for his experiments. Literary competitions were also an activity that took place at the Mouseion. At some point, early in its development, the Library grew out of the Mouseion. The best source we have for this development is the Letter of Aristeas. The unpopular emperor, Caracalla, was not fond of philosophers and carried out a massacre in the city in 215 AD. He also abolished financial support for the Mouseion. Thus, the absence of a resident royal patron of libraries was crucial for the downfall of Alexandria's libraries, as well as for the city's intellectual status as a whole.
246	Anuradhapura Maha Viharaya	Anuradhapura kingdom	Sri Lanka	The monastery was built by the Sinhalese king Devanampiya Tissa not long after his conversion to Buddhism by the Indian monk Mahendra, and it is recorded in the Mahāvaṃsa that thirty thousand monks attended the foundation. Because of the extreme importance of Buddhism in Sri Lanka, the prestige of the monks of the mahavihara was such that their power and influence often extended well beyond religion into the realm of secular politics. The layout was made in such a way as to function as a centre of education and social activities for a large number of monks and to allow masses to congregate.
ca. 246–221 (Note: records only attest its creation via Ptolemy III Euergetes (246-221 BC))	Serapeum	Ptolemaic Kingdom	Egypt	The shrine to the god Serapis, called the Serapeum, contained a "daughter" library to the Great Library. It was dedicated during the reign of Ptolemy III Euergetes. The building of the Serapeum as another learning institution in the city of Alexandria reflects the Ptolemies’ enthusiastic upkeep of the city's scholastic reputation. Under the patronage of the Romans in the later Imperial Period, the Serapeum seems to have surpassed the Great Library. All references to the Library indicate the Serapeum, and references to the Great Library in the Mouseion are just references to its past greatness. Towards the end of the Roman period there was the disastrous episode in the Library's history, when the Serapeum was destroyed by Christian zealots. In AD 391, a mob incited by Emperor Theodosius and his representative, the Patriarch Theophilus, burned all of the books contained in that library. This attack had been an effort to destroy all pagan temples.
c.a. third century	Pushpagiri Vihara	Maurya Empire	India	Though precise records of its founding remain scarce, scholars suggest that its origin dates back to the 3rd century BC, possibly during or soon after the reign of Emperor Ashoka, who was instrumental in the propagation of Buddhism. The region of Kalinga, after its conquest by Ashoka, became a significant centre of Buddhist activity, making it a fertile ground for a major educational institution like Pushpagiri. The Archaeological Survey of India (ASI) excavation reports support the claim of an educational complex via key findings at Lalitagiri (such as a relic casket believed to contain Buddha's remains), along with temple architecture, inscriptions, and sculptural artefacts. Xuanzang were a 7th-century Chinese monk who made pilgrimage to India and his travelogue records of the Pushpagiri Vihara: that the stone top of the monastery exhibited supernatural lights and other miracles, sunshades placed by worshippers on it between the dome and the amalaka remained there like needles held by a magnet. Inscriptions and archaeological structures indicate that it retained active learning communities well into the 11th–12th century, overlapping with the eventual decline of Nalanda and other major Buddhist universities.
124	Taixue	Han dynasty	China	Han scholars actively reflected on the reasons for the rapid collapse of the Qin Dynasty and concluded Qin's Burning of books and burying of scholars led to extreme instability. From the beginning of his reign, many ministers urged the revival of Confucianism to Emperor Wu but Empress Dou obstructed these efforts. It wasn't until 124 BC that the lack of educated scholars hindered governance. Emperor Wu thereupon adopted the proposals of Dong Zhongshu and Gongsun Hong, establishling Taixue outside north-west the temple walls of Chang'an. Besides the Classic of Poetry and the Spring and Autumn Annals, the Book of Documents, the Book of Rites and I Ching were also included, taught by Doctors of the Five Classics (五經博士) to cultivate talent for the government. Although it had 50 students initially, this number gradually increased. Besides the regular students (正式生) directly selected from the capital, prodigies from the country were also admitted as special students (特別生). Age requirements were not strict: some exceptionally bright students were selected before the age of 18. Although most students came from noble families, there were also students from relatively poor backgrounds.
28	Abhayagiri Vihāra	Anuradhapura kingdom	Sri Lanka	When Bhatika Abhaya came to Anuradhapura, he assumed the role government himself and forthwith destroyed the monastery of the Nirgrantha, in lieu building there a vihāra with twelve cells. When two hundred and seventeen years ten months and ten days had passed since the founding of the Mahavihara, the king - filled with pious zeal - built the Abhayagiri-vihara. Since the king Abhaya built it on the place of the monastery of the nigantha ‘’Giri’’, the vihāra received the name Abhayagiri. Abhayagiri was a well-structured educational institution where local and foreign bhikkhu, bhikkhunī and laypeople studied. The curriculum comprised formal, informal, and nonformal education. Formal education covered languages, poetry, religion, technology, art, history, medicine and Gupta Vidya. Nonformal education involved practical skills like creating gold items, producing coins and tiles, and writing poetry. Assemblies and meetings were organized to encourage knowledge sharing. According to Nikaya Sangrahawa, it embraced the doctrines of Vajjiputtuka and was known as the Dhammaruci school in Sri Lanka.

== AD ==
Year	University	Location		Notes
Year	University	Original	Current	Notes
75	Madaurus University	Numidia	Algeria	The Madaurus University (in Latin Madaurus, Madauros or Madaura) is a former university, one of the first on the African continent, of which only ruins remain, located in the city of M'daourouch in the wilaya of Souk Ahras in Algeria. It is often considered one of the earliest, if not the oldest, centers of higher learning in North Africa and the first in Africa, the university's construction dating back to the Roman era around 75 AD.
271	Academy of Gondishapur	Sasanian Empire	Iran	It is worth mentioning that this center was introduced as the world oldest university at the 39th general annual conference of Nations Educational, Scientific and Cultural Organization (UNESCO) at Paris in 2017. Although Jundishapur had been acquainted with the positive sciences since its foundation, it only became known for its knowledge of them at a much later date. According to Ibn al-Nadim, the city became famous for medical sciences and philosophy only after Théodoros, the Greek philosopher and medical doctor, moved there. Théodoros served as a royal doctor to Shapur II and composed several books on medical sciences, one of which was eventually translated into Arabic. Shahpur II held Théodoros in respect and even built a church for him in the city. The golden age of Jundishapur is during the reign of Khosrow I. Khosrow was a knowledge-loving Sassanid king. He sent his special physician, Borzuya, with a group of Iranian physicians to India in order to bring medical texts to Jundishapur and translate them to Persian. Khusraw's interest in philosophy made him famous in the West. The scholars at the Academy of Athens made their way to Jundishapur after their academy was closed, in 529, by Emperor Justinian. After defeating Justinian, Khusraw, who followed Neoplatonic philosophy, stipulated in the peace treaty that all of the philosophers living in Gundeshapur would be allowed to return to their homelands whenever they wished.
278	Guozijian	Jin dynasty	China	Emperor Wu of Jin established Guozixue(國子學) where 國子祭酒 and 國子博士 were appointed to teach students. Guozixue became segregated from Taixue in 293 wherein sons of fifth ranks or higher were permitted into Guozixue and sons of sixth ranks or lower were sent to Taixue. This established Guozixue as the sole highest education institution in China and it were renamed to Guozisi(國子寺) in Northern Qi. After Emperor Yang of Sui reunified China, he finally renamed it to Guozijian(國子監) in 607 wherein it were granted autonomy as 國子祭酒 were appointed as the Secretary of State for Education. Under Guozijian, he established five schools: Guozixue(國子學), Taixue(太學), 四門學 (which had five masters and assistants each), 書學 and Mathematics(算學) which had two masters and assistants each. Altogether, there were 980 students who were studying in the five schools. Although the first four schools were succeeded from previous dynasties, an independent school for Chinese mathematics were a Sui dynasty invention.
c.a. 340 (Note: although it’s theorised Constantine the Great established Capitalium as a higher-learning institution concurrently with the founding of Constaninople, the earliest attestations are recorded via Libanius teaching in 340)	University of Constantinople	Roman Empire	Turkey	There existed secondary schools that taught Christian and Classical literature and institutions of a higher character, comparable to modern universities, emerged as early as the first century, reaching their fully developed state in the fourth century, in Rome in the West and Athens, Alexandria, and Antioch in the East. Thus, it was only natural that the establishment of a university was included in Constantinople wherein Capitolium was a state building with lecture halls and library. Constantius II twice persuaded Libanius to move from Antioch to teach at Capitolium: 340–343; 348–354. Meanwhile, Themistius appears to have begun his academic career in Constantinople between 344 and 347 wherein he was appointed as Proconsul and further Praefectus urbi via Theodosius I with responsibilities to tutor the princes. Theodosius II thereafter established the positions of three Latin and five Greek rhetoricians, ten Latin and ten Greek grammarians, a chair of philosophy and two chairs of law in 425, whilst concurrently prohibiting private tutors from teaching in state lecture halls and, conversely, forbidding state professors from giving private lessons.
372	Taehak	Gogooryo	Korea	King Sosoorim imported Taixue via Tibetan Fu Qin (符秦) along with Buddhism. It is hypothesised military science and martial arts were also taught as well as traditional Confucian philosophy. Silla also established Gookhak(國學) in 682, renamed to Taehakgam(太學監): though it were renamed back to Gookhak later on. Although direct records of Taehak cannot be found vis-à-vis Baekje, there are sixth century records of a title called Taehakjong(太學正), which indirectly proves the existence of Taehak in Baekje as well.
c.a. 415-455 (Note: records only attest its creation via Kumaragupta (415-455))	Nalanda mahavihara	Gupta Empire	India	Xuanzang were a 7th-century Chinese monk who made pilgrimage to India and his travelogue records the origins of the Mahavihara, repeated by the later Korean pilgrim Hyecho. The name of the royal founder is provided by both as Śakrāditya, further aided in its credibility via a seal discovered at the site: Śakrāditya has thus been identified with the Gupta emperor, Kumaragupta I who reigned between 415 and 455. Therefore, this may explain the absence of Nalanda mahavihara in the travelogues of Faxian who also toured northern India between 400 and 411. Xuanzang further recorded that, "if men of other quarters desire to enter and take part in the discussions, the keeper of the gate proposes some hard questions; many are unable to answer, and retire." The reason seems to have been that the Mahavihara had to cope with a rush for admission since it were a matter of prestige to have taken a course there. Yijing were also one such Chinese monk who recorded c.a. 3,000 students at the Mahavihara and accounted that it was usual for learners after preliminary training, to resort to Nalanda or to Valabhi for further studies. The fame, that Nalanda acquired when it developed into a monastic university, is evident in that Xuanzang stayed as a resident for circa six years whereas Yijing stayed for a further ten. Because Odantapuri were sacked and razed to the ground circa 1198, it is hypothesised Nalanda mahavihara met a similar fate. However, it is recorded Rahula Shribhadra taught Sanskrit grammar to seventy students despite the threats of impeding raids from the military head-quarters at Odantapuri, whereof he were eventually arrested and whereupon thrown into a military prison there. A fresh raid scattered what little remained in the Mahavihara and Dharmasvamin, the only student who returned, is the last recorded disciple of Nalanda mahavihara.
fifth century	Ratnagiri, Odisha	Gupta Empire	India	A number of sealings bearing the legend Śri Ratnāgiri-mahāvihriy-āryabhikśu-samghāsya, with its nucleus dating at least from about the fifth century AD were discovered in excavations. Taranatha in his "History of Buddhism in India," says that a vihāra called Ratnagiri was built on the crest of a mountain in the kingdom of Odivisa in the reign of Buddhapakṣa (identified with the Gupta Emperor Narasimhagupta). The establishment witnessed a phenomenal growth in religion, art and architecture till the twelfth century AD. It played a significant role in disseminating Buddhist culture and religion by forming itself, like Nalanda, an important religious and philosophical academy of the intellectual stalwarts of Buddhism. By the end of the thirteenth century, the building activities suffered a sharp setback as a repercussion of the disastrous inroad of Muslim invaders in large parts of India. However, though no longer in an affluent state, the Buddhists continued to maintain themselves for a few centuries more to sustain the dying flame of the faith till about the sixteenth century. Tibetan references indicate that Ratnagiri was noted for the spiritual inspiration and lively pursuit of the Kalachakra in the later part of the tenth century AD. The veracity of these references in the late Tibetan works is amply borne out by the excavated remains. The excavations laid bare the remains of an imposing stupa, two magnificent monasteries, a single winged monastery, eight temples, a large number of stupas, sculptures and architectural pieces, and objects of daily use. The cells have yielded bronze images, stupas and choultry, myriads of clay sealings and two iron daggers. When this monastery fell into clay, a complete overhauling took place some time after the eleventh century AD. In this filling lay a good number of the sealings of the Ratnagiri mahvihara. The new facade was also lavishly carved, but the embellishment fell short of standard by the earlier builders.
c.a. 640 (Note: the earliest attestations are recorded via Xuanzang who visited Vallabhi in 640)	Valabhi University	Maitraka dynasty	India	By the first century, the debate over whether it was possible for a monk who owned property (e.g. who wore clothes) to achieve moksha divided the Jain community. This division was formalised at the Council of Valabhi (453 or 466), which codified Jain scripture without the participation of Digambara monks. However, by the time the Chinese Buddhist pilgrim Xuanzang visited Vallabhi in the second quarter of the 7th century, he found its ruler to be a Buddhist follower. Yijing were also one such monk who described it to equal the fame of the Buddhist monastic centre Nalanda mahavihara and accounted that it was usual for learners after preliminary training, to resort to Nalanda or to Valabhi for further studies. The great Buddhist teachers - Sthiramati and Gunamati - of Nalanda were for some time in charge of Buddhistic teaching at Valabhi. Kathasaritsagara, the well-known Sanskrit work, makes mention of a Brahman of the Indo-Gangetic Plain sending his son to Valabhi for higher education. This shows the widespread reputation which Valabhi enjoyed as a seat of learning.
671	Daigaku-ryō	Asuka period	Japan	It is recorded that aristocrats who fled from Baekje after the defeat at Battle of Baekgang were awarded indigenous Japanese ranks and reorganised to vassals of the Japanese king. The title of 學職頭 recorded for Gwisil Jipsa in 671 corresponds to the later title of Daigaku-no-kami. The recorded title of 法官大輔 is also worth noting since 法官 corresponds to Shikibu-shō so it is also contested that a preceding organisation for Daigaku-ryō (run by 法官 who regulated 礼儀) had already been established in the reign of Emperor Tenji, and it were home to the highly educated of Baekje. Daigaku-ryō was under the jurisdiction of Shikibu-shō and headed by 頭 (upper 従 fifth rank) who supervised students for the examinations. Wherein underneath there were one 四等官 each of: 助 (lower 正 sixth rank), 大允 (lower 正 seventh rank), 少允 (upper 従 seventh rank), 大属 (upper 従 eighth rank), 少属 (lower 従 eighth rank); and 20 使部 and two 直丁 who handled miscellaneous tasks.
682	Gookhak	Silla	Korea	When Kim Choonchoo and his son Kim Bommin paid tribute to Emperor Taizong of Tang in 648, Kim Choonchoo received permission to observe Seokjeon Daeje and 講論 of 國學. It is theorised this experience influenced the creation of the 大舍 title in Silla in 651. However, Gookhak weren't fully formalised till the position of 卿, head of Gookhak, were established in 682. Gookhak also had the position of master(博士), assistant(助敎) and 史, the lowest position. It is recorded the likes of Gang soo (强首) and Seol Chong held 卿 (head of Gookhak) and the positions of 博士 and 助敎 were responsible for directly tutoring students. 讀書三品科 (exam of three 品 on literature) were additionally established in 788 via King Wonsong (hypothesised to be a form of exit exam) wherein: students who could aptly interpret one of Zuo Zhuan, Book of Rites or Wen Xuan, whilst accurately memorising both Analects and Classic of Filial Piety were granted the title of Upper 品; students who read 曲禮, Analects and Classic of Filial Piety were granted Middle 品; and students who read 曲禮 and Classic of Filial Piety were granted Lower 品.
c.a. early eighth century	Odantapuri	Pala Empire	India	After Harsha the monastic religion like Buddhism, which depended very much on the rulers’ patronage, witnessed a setback. But, while it was disappearing from other parts of India, it experienced another great revival in eastern India where it found most of the Pala rulers to be devout Buddhists, who were responsible for the new endowments to the Nalanda mahavihara and also for the foundation of new monasteries such as Vikramashila, Odantapuri and Somapura Mahavihara which almost monopolised the commerce in Buddhist culture from the ninth to the twelfth century AD. The founder of Pala dynasty is said, in the Tibetan legends, to have founded in the early half of the eighth century a mahavihara of grand proportions in the newly built city of Odantapur, only about seven miles from Nalanda. There is evidence in Tibetan legends that there used to be migration of scholars from one place to another. Atiśa received ordination from Nalanda, studied there and also at Odantapuri and finally became the head of Vikramashila from where he was escorted to Tibet. One Tibetan legend puts the number of its inmates at 12,000. But towards the end of the 11th century AD it must have gone far into decline when Muslim soldiers, under Muhammad Bakhtiyar Khalji committed a complete massacre of all 53 monks of Odantapuri circa 1198.
c.a. 770-810 (Note: records only attest its creation via Dharmapala (c.a. 770-810))	Vikramashila	Pala Empire	India	It was in its peak period under the patronage of the Buddhist Pala kings of Bengal. The university granted the degree of Mahapandita and Pandita, equivalent to Master of the Arts. The pictures of most eminent among the Mahapanitas and Panditas of Vikramashila, it is said, decorated the walls. The Tibetan legends say that, when in the reign of king Ramapala, Abhayakaragupta was its head and there were 160 professors as well as 1,000 resident monks. It appears from the legends that a functionary whose designation was ‘guardian of the gate’ acted both at Nalanda and Vikramashila. Nalanda had one gate while Vikramashila had six, each kept by a Dvarapala - a scholar of high eminence. The famous Tantric saint Siddha and scholar Naropa held the office of the keeper of the northern gate of the establishment. Here Tibetan scholars, of whom had the Indian name Dharmakirti translated Sanskrit works into Classical Tibetan. By the close of the twelfth century almost all the important centres of northern, western and central India were affected by Muslim invasions, and there began a period of rapid decline. In the beginning of the thirteenth century, the structures of the Vikramashila mahavihara were razed to the ground by the invaders.
810-850 (Note: records only attest its creation via Devapala (810-850))	Somapura Mahavihara	Pala Empire	Bangladesh	Built by Emperor Dharmapala of the Pala Empire, who were devout Buddhists, it was the largest of its kind in India as a quadrangular monastery with a terraced edifice in the centre. In the narratives of the lives of eminent Buddhist saints and scholars, interspersed in Tibetan history references are made to their occupancy of the headships of different centres of Buddhist learning: Nalanda, Odantapuri and Somapura. There is evidence in Tibetan legends that there used to be migration of scholars from one place to another. Vipulaśrī has left an inscription at Nalanda recording his construction of a temple to Tara in Somapura, as well as his erection of a monastery at Nalanda. However, when Xuanzang came to this region in 639, he remarks that Nirgranthas (id est. Jains) are the most numerous. This is because the existing establishment was overhauled and remodelled and the Jain temple rebuilt as a Buddhist one by Emperor Devapala. Intercourse in the Pala period between the Mahavihara and that of Nalanda is suggested by the decorative style of stone-temples at Nalanda where terracotta plaques are raised in rows exactly as in this Mahavihara. The establishment of Somapura seems to have been designed for the occupation of some 600-800 inmates. It carried on the Nalanda tradition which had been passed on to Odantapira and Vikramashila and was inherited by it. Atiśa stayed here for some time before his departure for Tibet. The downfall of the establishment by desertion or destruction must have been some time in the midst of the widespread unrest and displacement of population consequent on the Muslim invasion.
930	Gookjagam	Goryo	Korea	Goryo reunified the Korean peninsula in the twilight of the first millennium and established the new capital of the peninsula in Kaesong whence their source of political power were based. King Taejo whereupon founded 西京學校, believed to be a form of 學院, and chose 廷鶚 as 書學博士, believed to be a form of tutor. However, it wasn't till the reign of King Songjong when it was reorganised into Gookjagam, modelled after Guozijian, whence it taught law(律學), writing(書學) and mathematics(算學) - centred around Confucianism. King Jongjong allowed students of Gookjagam, who studied for three years, the opportunity to take the 國子監試 and King Moonjong ordered students to be expelled if they had little outcome. King Yejong further introduced 七齋 “seven disciplines” in 1109 and it is worth noting one were 講藝齋 with a student quota of eight that taught martial arts, a reflection of the tumultuous time when Goryo were in conflict with Jurchen people. He also established a student financial aid institution in 1119 called 養賢庫. However, its role were critically reduced after a coup d'état in 1170 whence no further records are visible till Mongol Suzerainty when Chooŋnyol lamented that few scholars of Gookjagam were true masters. An Hyang thereupon aided in resuscitating the university and changed its name to Soŋgyoongwan in 1310, reaching its renaissance during the reign of Gongmin whence he increased its student quota to 100 and employed famous scholars such as Yi Saek and Chŏng Mongju as tutors. It were rebuilt in 1605 after it burnt down in the Imjin War.
c.a. 1077-1120 (Note: records only attest its creation via Ramapala (c.a. 1077-1120))	Jagaddala Mahavihara	Pala Empire	Bangladesh	The last great seat of Buddhist learning founded by a Pala emperor was in Varendra. It flourished in the reign of Ramapala, who is also credited as its founder. It was specifically a resort for Vajrayana and it appears to have been in lively intercourse with Tibetan centres of Buddhism as both the original Sanskrit texts and Tibetan translations of Tengyur and Kangyur are said to have been either made or copied there. It was intact till Śākyaśribhadra betook himself there whence he found pupils and disciples. Vibhuticandra (རྣལ་འབྱོར་ཟླ་བ་) and Danashila (དཱ་ན་ཤཱི་ལ།) were such disciples who were scholars of Tibetan and Sanskrit at Jaddala mahavihara. Around the time of the Sena dynasty, Muslim invasions had destroyed Odantapuri and Vikramashila, killing many Bhikkhu in the process. This was the context wherein Śākyaśribhadra fled here, whence he left to Tibet after three years. Although Varendra itself was sacked circa 1207, it is theorised the monastery had already been deserted at that time.
1076	Quốc Tử Giám	Lý dynasty	Vietnam	Emperor Lý Thánh Tông established Quốc Tử Giám, modelled after Guozijian and permitted the crown prince to study there. It was later renamed to Quốc Tử viện in 1253 during the Trần dynasty and again to Thái Học đường in 1483 during the Lê dynasty. It was located behind the Văn Miếu with lecture halls, dormitories, a printing house and a large courtyard in the centre. There are steles still present at the site commemorating tiến sĩ khoa thi nho học, masters who passed the Imperial examination.
ca. 1040–1147	University of al-Qarawiyyin	Almoravid dynasty	Morocco	see above
ca. 14th century	University of Ez-Zitouna	Hafsid dynasty	Tunisia	see above
1398	Soŋgyoongwan	Joson Kingdom	South Korea	see above
1453	Istanbul University	Ottoman Empire	Turkey	see above
c.a. 1410-1466 (Note: records only attest its creation via Uesugi Norizane (c.a. 1410-1466))	Ashikaga Gakko	Muromachi period	Japan	Although there exist many theories on when it was founded, it is certain it was rebuilt into an academic institution in the Muromachi period via the Kanrei (deputy Shogun) of Kantō, Uesugi Norizane. As well as donating many valuable books, such as 尚書正義, he further invited 快元 from Engaku-ji to be the inaugural principal in order to accelerate its development. When academic codes and regulations, as well as dormitories, were established, students gathered from across the archipelago, ranging from Mutsu Province to Ryukyu Kingdom, that rumours spread overseas of 学徒三千人 “three thousand pupils”. From contemporary textbooks and records, it can be deduced subjects on I Ching, military science and medicine were taught - centred around Confucianism. Although no archaeological sites from the Muromachi period can be found, drawings believed to date from the Tokugawa shogunate show buildings and gardens in the centre surrounded by moats and earthworks with Sandō extending south, and further depictions of a vegetable garden provide valuable insight into contemporary student life. It is recorded in letters Francis Xavier sent to Jesuits of Goa in 1549 that, “Ashikaga Gakko is an academy in Kantō.” It is further recorded in the ‘’Historia de Japam’’ published by Luís Fróis that, “there exists only one university and open school in the whole of Japan. It is located in Ashikaga of Shimotsuke Province.” Its prestigious status came to an end when it was converted into a Hyanggyo in the twilight of the Tokugawa shogunate, eventually closing in 1872.
ca. 1516–1517	Al-Azhar University	Ottoman Empire	Egypt	see above
1639	Ryukoku University	Tokugawa shogunate	Japan	
1790	University of Tokyo	Tokugawa shogunate	Japan	see above

== See also ==
- Madrasa
- Medieval university
- Nizamiyya
- Academy § History,
- University § History
- Pirivena
- List of oldest universities in continuous operation
