= Shiladitya (disambiguation) =

Shiladitya (IAST: Śilāditya / Śīlāditya) may refer to:

- Shiladitya, a 7th-century Indian king mentioned by the Chinese traveler Xuanzang; generally identified with the Pushyabhuti king Harsha
- Shiladitya of Malwa, a 6th-century Indian king mentioned by Xuanzang; generally identified with the Maitraka king Shiladitya I
- Shiladitya I (Maitraka dynasty)
- Shiladitya II (Maitraka dynasty), 6th-century Maitraka king of Vallabhi in present-day India
- Shiladitya III (Maitraka dynasty), 7th and 8th-century Maitraka king of Vallabhi in present-day India
- Shiladitya (Guhila dynasty), 7th-century Guhila king of present-day India
- Shiladitya IV (Maitraka dynasty), 8th-century Maitraka king of Vallabhi in present-day India
- Shiladitya V (Maitraka dynasty), 8th-century Maitraka king of Vallabhi in present-day India
- Shiladitya VI (Maitraka dynasty), 8th-century Maitraka king of Vallabhi in present-day India
- Silhadi, 16th-century chieftain of Malwa in central India
