= Shiladitya =

Mediaeval Indian king

Shiladitya (IAST: Śīlāditya) is the title of a 7th-century Indian king mentioned in the writings of the Chinese traveler Xuanzang (Hieun Tsang).

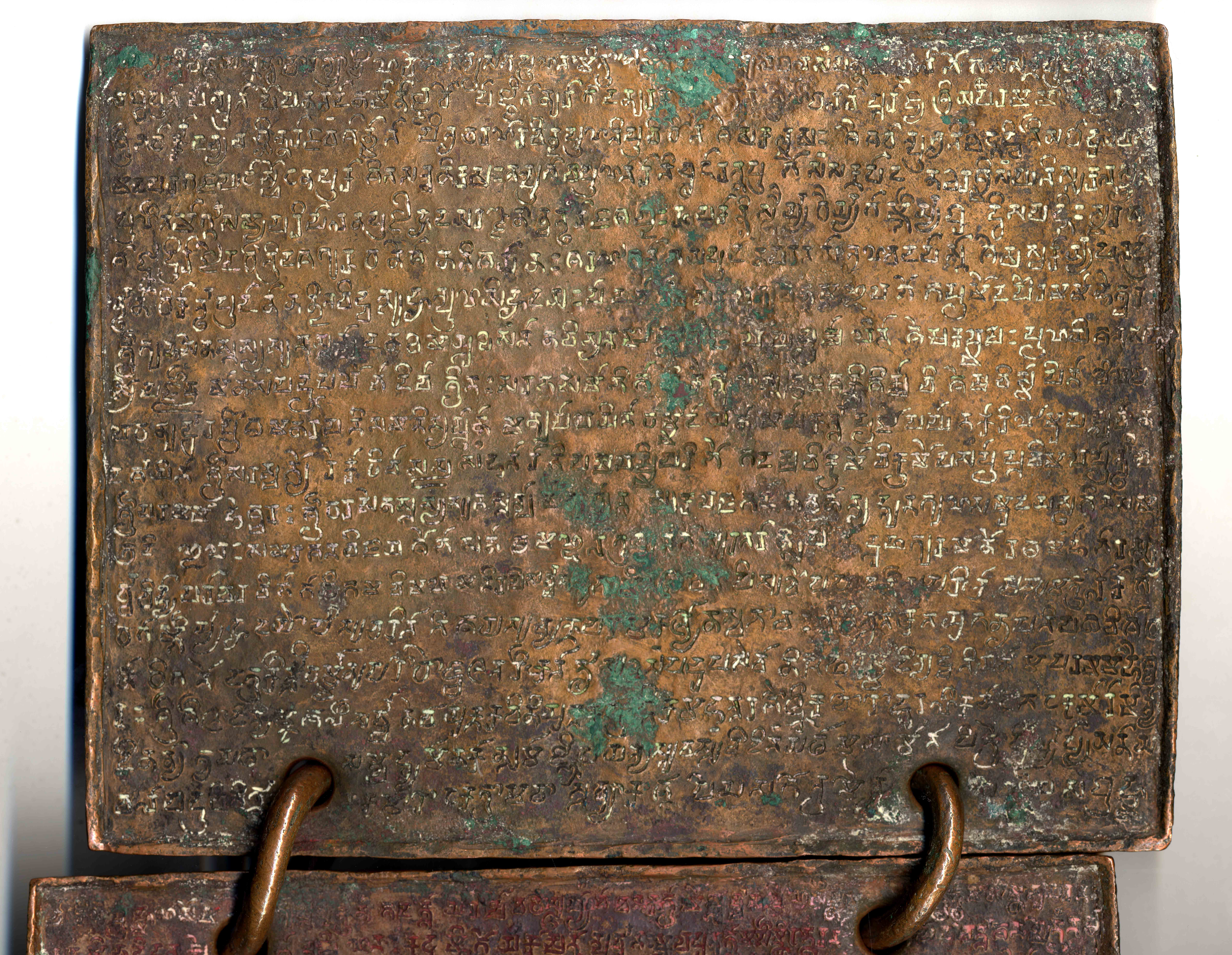
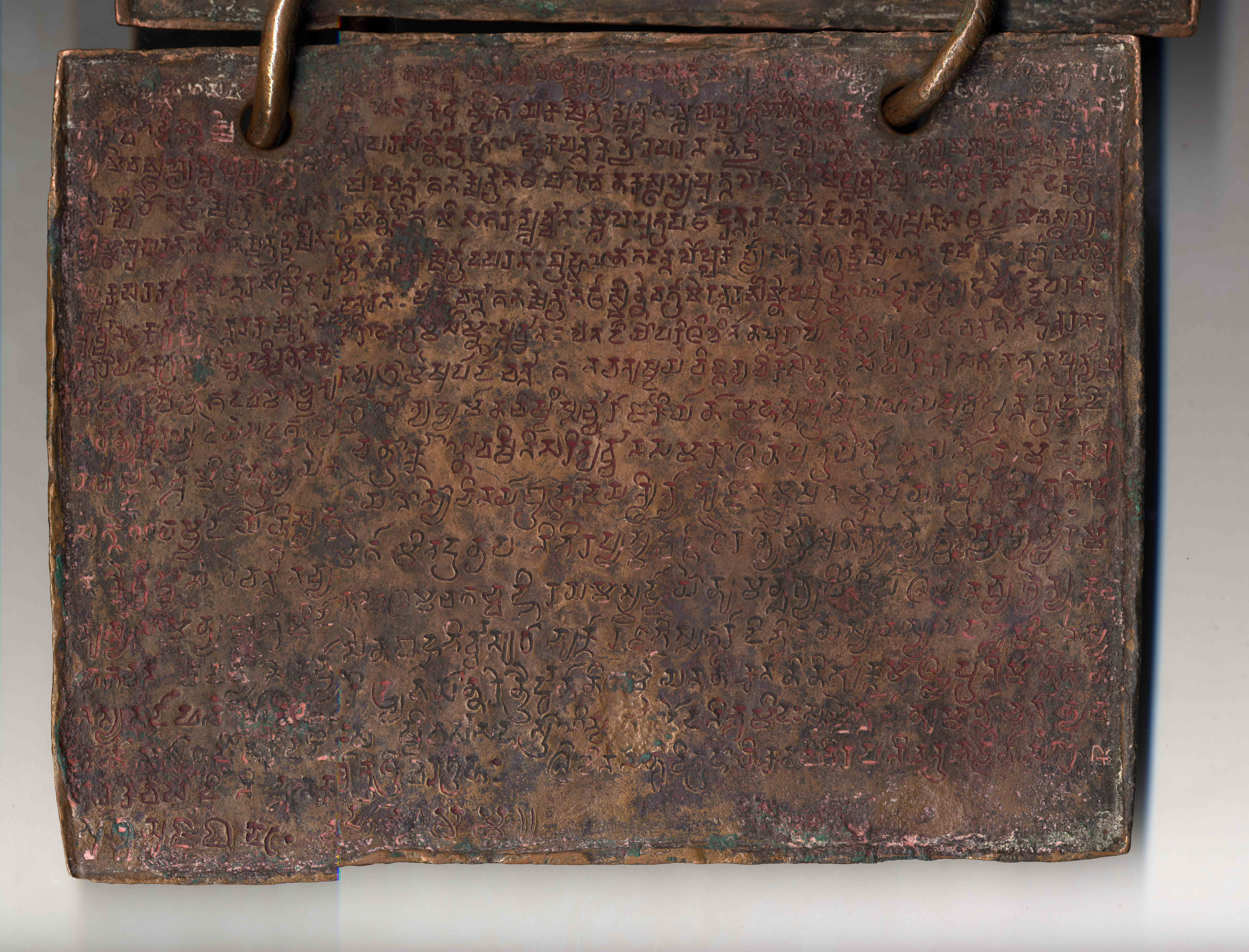
Copper plate grant issued by Maitraka king Śīlāditya I, dated year 290 [?] aśvayuja badi 10 recording a donation of villages and lands.

Xuanzang mentions him in Fascicle V of Dà Táng Xīyù Jì (Great Tang Records on the Western Regions). He is described as a prince reluctant to accept the throne. His citizens persuaded him to accept the throne, which he did. As his first act, Shiladitya gathered an army of 50,000 foot soldiers, 5,000 elephant-mounted soldiers and 20,000 cavalry to avenge the wrongful assassination of his elder brother. Over a six year campaign, he subdued the five regions of India (north, west, south, east, central), expanding his army as he won over new territories. Then, for thirty years he raised no weapons of war against anyone, and ruled in peace. He banned meat-eating in his lands, announced capital punishment for anyone killing any living creature (not such human being). He built numerous stupas along the Ganges river, many 100 feet high. He also built numerous monasteries and deva temples. On festive days, he would feed hundreds of sramanas and brahmins.

If the lords and their assistant ministers of the small neighboring countries performed meritorious deeds tirelessly and sought goodness without weariness, the king [Shiladitya] would take them by the hand to sit together with him and call them “good friends.” He never spoke to those kings who were different in character, and if a negotiation was required to settle a matter an envoy was sent to deal with it. Whenever he went on an inspection tour he would not stay at any one place but would have a hut made for his lodging wherever he stopped on the way. During the three months of the rainy season he would not travel about because of the rain. At his temporary residence he always had delicious food prepared every day to feed one thousand monks of different schools and five hundred brahmins. He always divided a day into three periods: one was spent attending to state affairs and two were devoted to performing meritorious deeds and doing good work. He lived assiduously and the day was too short for him.

— Xuanzang, Great Tang Records of the Western World, Book V

Xuanzang states in his Fascicle V that Shiladitya was of Vaishya descent, and built colossal stupas and temples dedicated to the Buddha, Surya, and Shiva.

== Identification ==
Shiladitya is identified with Harsha by many scholars. According to this theory, Kie-Jo-Kio-She-Kwo is Kanyakubja (Kannauj), while Po-lo-ye-kia is Prayag.

Xuanzang also mentions another king named Shiladitya, of "Mo-la-po" kingdom. One theory identifies this king as Shiladitya I of Vallabhi. In this case, his religious preference is unclear.
