= University of ancient Taxila =

Ancient university in Taxila

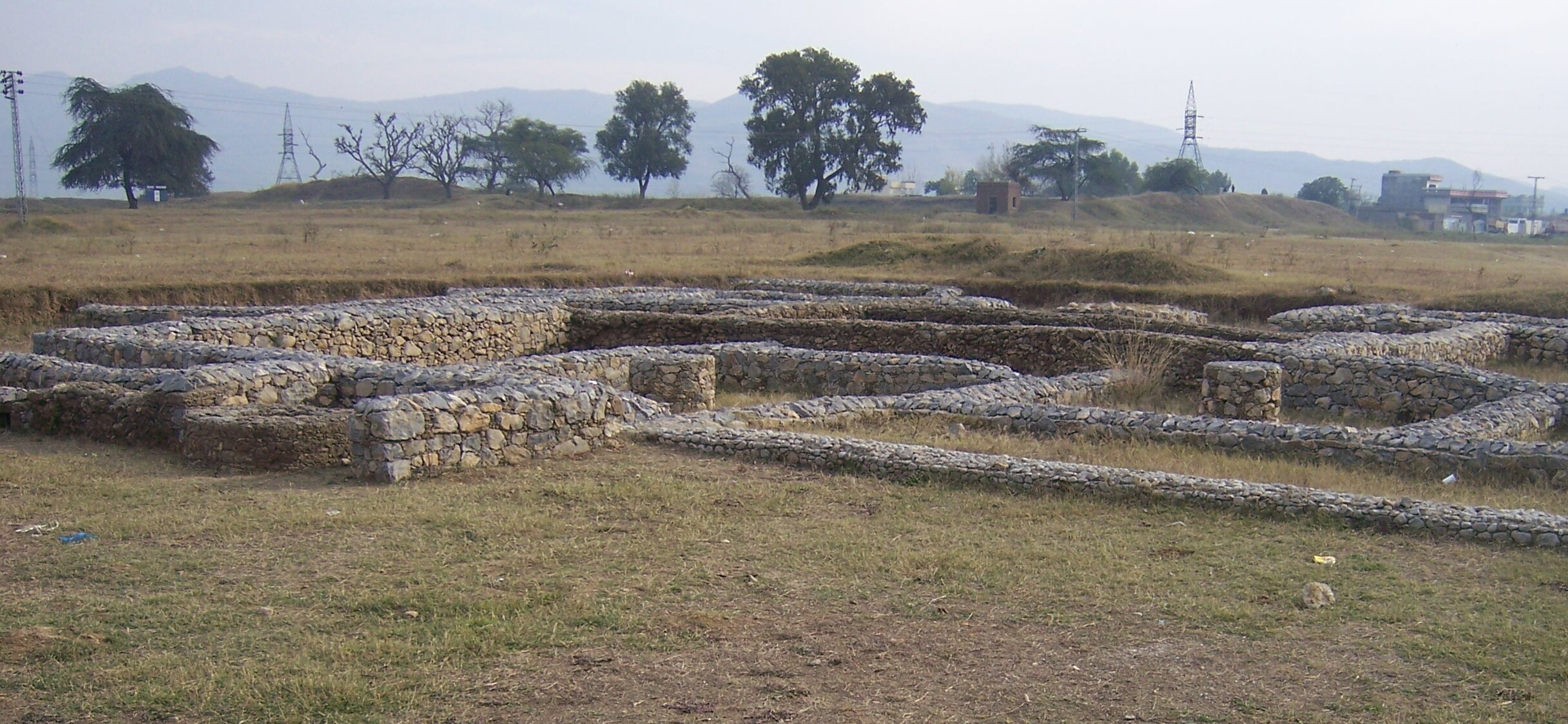
- Ruins of Bhir Mound archaeological site

- Shown in Punjab University of ancient Taxila (Pakistan)
- 33.74°N 72.78°E
- Type: Centre of learning
- Location: Taxila, Punjab, Pakistan
- Region: South Asia
- Part of: Ancient higher-learning institutions

History
- Built: c. 5th century BCE
- Abandoned: c. 5th century CE

Site notes
- Condition: Ruins
- Owner: Government
- Public access: Yes

The ancient city of Taxila in northwestern Punjab, Pakistan has been noted by a number of scholars to have acted as a centre of education in the religious and secular topics, conventionally called university of ancient Taxila, both as a famed seat of Sanskrit and Vedic learning, and in the early centuries CE, as a prominent centre of Buddhist scholarship as well.

== Background ==
Following the Achaemenid conquest of the Indus Valley, around c. 520 BCE, Taxila is suggested by some scholars to have become the capital of their Hindush satrapy (province); the earliest known archaeological remains date to this period. The king Taxiles of the city surrendered to Alexander in 326 BCE and preserved his town and position. It was annexed by the Maurya Empire around 317 BCE, later becoming part of the Indo-Greek Kingdom, around 200 BCE. Following a succession of the Indo-Scythian and Indo-Parthian rule, it was conquered and rebuilt a new city by the Kushan Empire around 30 CE, under which Taxila flourished as a seat of Buddhist learning. It was conquered, destroyed and abandoned by the Hunas in the 5th century CE.

Taxila was strategically located at the crossroads of the main trade routes of Asia, and was a cultural and ethnic melting pot. The 4th–3rd century BCE Buddhist Jataka tales assert Taxila to be the location where Uddālaka Āruṇi and his son Śvetaketu each had received their education, while it is named by the 4th century BCE grammarian, Pāṇini in his Aṣṭādhyāyī.

== University ==
According to John Marshall, Taxila emerged as a centre of learning after the Persian conquests due to its geographical position, "at the North-Western gateway of the subcontinent," and the "cosmopolitan character of her population." It started as a Brahmanical seat of learning. According to Frazier and Flood, the highly systemized Vedic model of learning helped establish Buddhist Mahavihara at the site, and later Nalanda (mid 5th century CE), Odantapuri (8th century CE), and Vikramashila (late 8th century CE). These Buddhist institutions not only taught Vedic texts and the ritual but also the different theoretical disciplines associated with the limbs or the sciences of the Vedas, which included disciplines such as linguistics, law, astronomy and reasoning. Taxila was particularly known for Vedic science, medicine, and the arts, but both religious and secular subjects were taught, including subjects such as archery or astrology.

According to John Marshall, "In early Buddhist literature, particularly in the Jatakas, Taxila is frequently mentioned as a university centre where students could get instruction in almost any subject, religious or secular, from the Veda to mathematics and medicine, even to astrology and archery." The role of Taxila as a center of knowledge grew more prominent under the Maurya Empire and the Indo-Greeks rule in the 3rd and 2nd centuries BCE. In the early centuries CE it was a prominent centre of Buddhist scholarship as well.

Archaeological and literary evidence indicates that it also functioned as a Jain seat of learning, with Jain shrines and monks present at the site alongside Buddhism. Excavations at Sirkap by John Marshall revealed numerous small and large temples, some of which he identified as Jain shrines on the basis of their architectural similarities with sites such as Kankali Tila in Mathura. Jain literary traditions record that the site once housed more than 500 Jain temples and served as a seat of Jain learning.

It was not a university in the modern sense, in that the teachers living there may not have had official membership of particular colleges, in contrast to the later Nalanda university in Bihar.

The destruction by Toramana in the 5th century CE seem to have put an end to the activities of Taxila as a centre of learning.

The ancient university is regarded as the site for the composition and compiling of several pivotal works of Sanskrit literature, including the Arthaśāstra of Kauṭilya, the Aṣṭādhyāyī of Pāṇini, and the Pāñcatantra of Viṣṇuśarman.

== Professors ==
Influential professors who are said to have taught at university of Taxila include:

- Pāṇini, the 4th century BCE grammarian, possibly from Gandhāra
- Chanakya, the influential 4th century BCE, advisor of Chandragupta Maurya, is believed by Buddhist texts to have hailed from and been teaching at Taxila.
- Kumāralāta, according to the 3rd century CE Chinese Buddhist monk and traveller Yuan Chwang, Kumāralāta, the founder of Sautrāntika school was also an excellent teacher at Taxila and attracted students from as far as China.

== Students ==
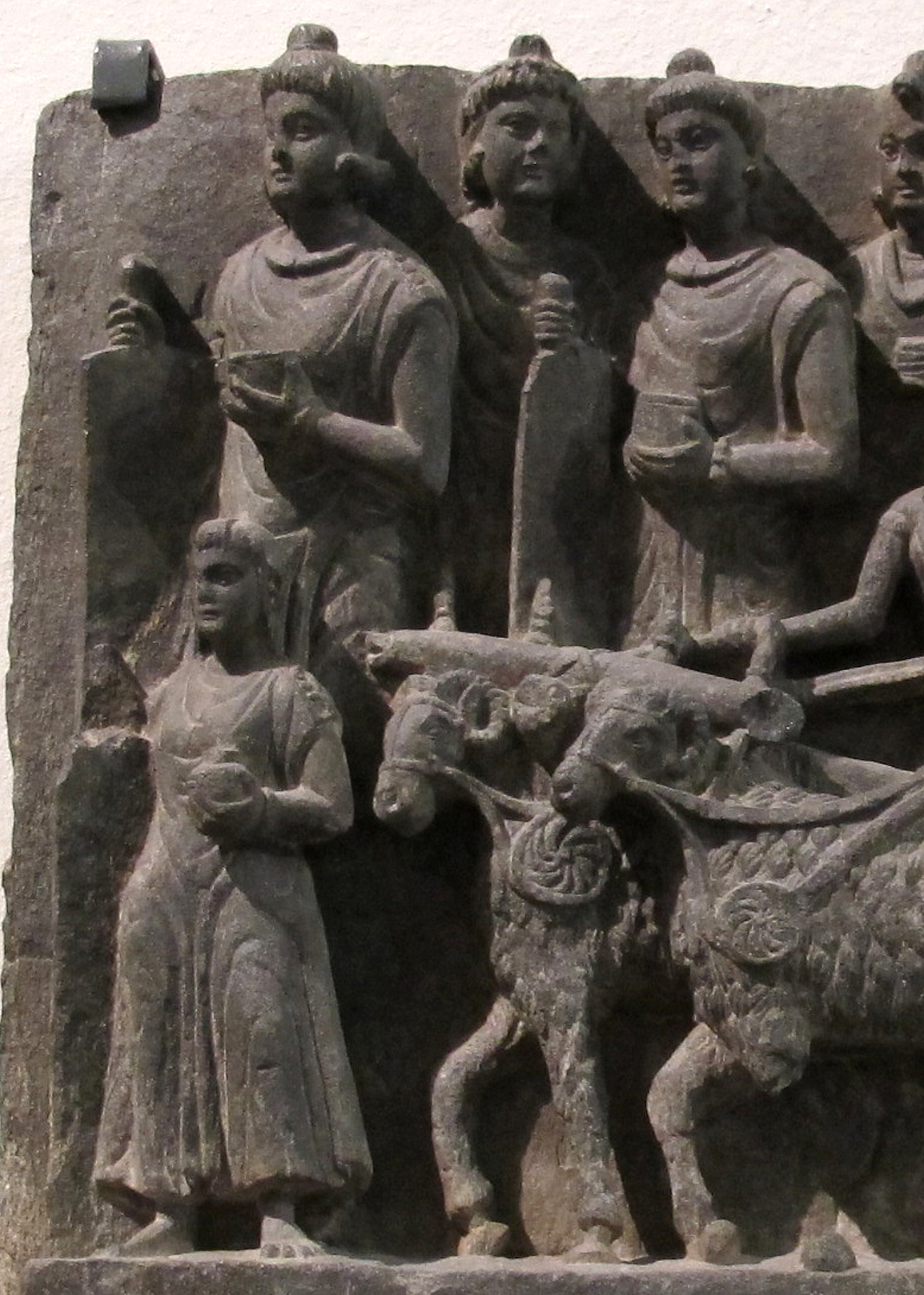
Students with their oblong palettes used for writing, in the Greco-Buddhist art of Gandhara. The young Buddha accompanying them to go to school is also part of the complete scene. 2nd-3rd century CE, Victoria and Albert Museum.

According to Stephen Batchelor, the Buddha may have been influenced by the experiences and knowledge acquired by some of his closest followers in the foreign capital of Taxila. Several contemporaries, and close followers, of the Buddha are said to have studied in Taxila.

Jain narratives also suggest that Mahavira and some of his disciples spent time in the region of Taxila university.

- King Pasenadi of Kosala, a close friend of the Buddha.
- Bandhula, the commander of Pasedani's army.
- Aṅgulimāla, a close follower of the Buddha. A Buddhist story about Aṅgulimāla (also called Ahiṃsaka, and later a close follower of Buddha), relates how his parents sent him to Taxila to study under a well-known teacher. There he excels in his studies and becomes the teacher's favorite student, enjoying special privileges in his teacher's house. However, the other students grow jealous of Ahiṃsaka's speedy progress and seek to turn his master against him. To that end, they make it seem as though Ahiṃsaka has seduced the master's wife.
- Jivaka, court doctor at Rajagriha and personal doctor of the Buddha.
- Charaka, the Indian "father of medicine" and one of the leading authorities in Ayurveda, is also said to have studied at Taxila, and practiced there.
- Chandragupta Maurya, Buddhist literature states that Chandragupta Maurya, the future founder of the Mauryan Empire, though born near Patna (Bihar) in Magadha, was taken by Chanakya for his training and education to Taxila, and had him educated there in "all the sciences and arts" of the period, including military sciences. There he studied for eight years. The Greek and Hindu texts also state that Kautilya (Chanakya) was a native of the northwest Indian subcontinent, and Chandragupta was his resident student for eight years. These accounts match Plutarch's assertion that Alexander the Great met with the young Chandragupta while campaigning in the Punjab.
- Indrabhuti Gautama, the chief disciple of Mahavira, is believed to have been associated with Taxila.

== See also ==
- Ancient institutions of learning in the Indian subcontinent
  - Sharada Peeth
  - Nalanda mahavihara (mid-5th century CE)
  - Odantapuri mahavihara (8th-century CE)
  - Vikramashila mahavihara (late 8th century CE)
  - Mithila - Sanskrit and Vedic learning
  - Nadia - Sanskrit and Vedic learning

== Sources ==
- Altekar, Anant Sadashiv (1965). Education in Ancient India (6th ed.). Nand Kishore.
- Frazier, Jessica; Flood, Gavin (30 June 2011). The Continuum Companion to Hindu Studies. A&C Black. p. 34. ISBN 978-0-8264-9966-0.
- Kulke, Hermann; Rothermund, Dietmar (2004). A History of India (4th ed.). New York: Routledge. ISBN 978-0-415-32919-4.
- Lowe, Roy; Yasuhara, Yoshihito (4 October 2016). The Origins of Higher Learning: Knowledge networks and the early development of universities. Routledge. ISBN 978-1-317-54326-8.
- Malalasekera, G.P. (1960), Dictionary of Pāli Proper Names, vol. 1, Delhi: Pali Text Society, OCLC 793535195
- Marshall, John (1951). Taxila: Structural remains – Volume 1. University Press.
- Marshall, John (2013). A Guide to Taxila. Cambridge University Press. pp. 23–24. ISBN 9781107615441.
- Mookerji, Radha Kumud (1988) [first published in 1966], Chandragupta Maurya and his times (4th ed.), Motilal Banarsidass, ISBN 81-208-0433-3
- Wilson, Liz (2016), "Murderer, Saint and Midwife", in Holdrege, Barbara A.; Pechilis, Karen (eds.), Refiguring the Body: Embodiment in South Asian Religions, SUNY Press, pp. 285–300, ISBN 978-1-4384-6315-5
