= Devardhigani Kshamashraman =

5th century Jain ascetic

Vachanacharya Devardhigani Kshamashraman
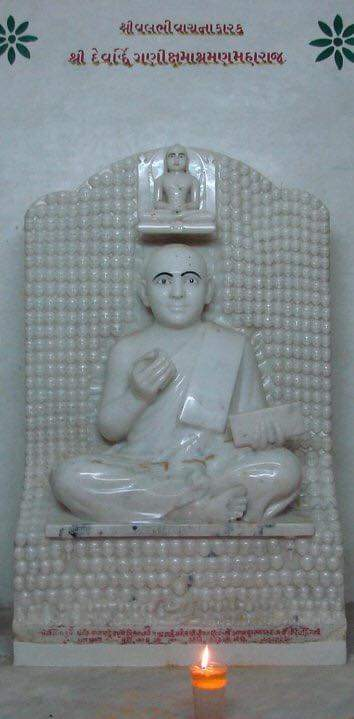
- Acharya Devardhigani Kshamashraman An idol of Acharya Shri Devardhigani Kshamashraman at Vallabhi tirth.
- Died: 473 AD

Religious life
- Religion: Jainism
- Sect: Śvetāmbara
- Initiation: by Acharya Lohityasuri

Devardhi or Vachanacharya Devardhigani Kshamashramana or Devavachaka was a Jain ascetic of the Śvetāmbara sect and an author of several Prakrit texts.

He was a prominent figure in Jainism in the 5th century AD. Mainly known for his contributions to the compilation and preservation of the canonical Jain scriptures, he is one of the most revered ascetics of the Śvetāmbara sect of Jainism. It was under his guidance that the second council of Vallabhi was held to preserve the remaining canonical texts of Jainism. Apart from the compilation of the canonical texts, he has been revered for his spiritual teachings as well.

== Early life ==
Devardhigani was born in the Kshatriya caste of the Kashyap gotra (family lineage). According to a legend, Mahavira had told Saudharmendra (demi-god in Jainism) in a holy assembly in Rajgruhi city,

"Harinaigmeshin transferred me during my state of embryo from the womb of Devananda to the womb of Trishala and after 1000 years of my nirvana (emencipation), he would live again by the name of Devardhigani and he would be the final authority on the Drishtivaad (the title of twelfth anga)."

His mother, Kalavati, named him Devardhi after a divine vision she had during her pregnancy.

== Initiation ==
According to a legend, in his youth, he was interested in hunting. He had a life-threatening encounter with a lion which led to a spiritual awakening. Terrified and helpless, he vowed to devote himself to spiritual pursuits if saved. Following this incident, he sought guidance from Acharya Lohityasuri and embraced monkhood in the Śvetāmbara sect of Jainism.

== Contributions ==
His most notable contributions revolve around the preservation and compilation of Jain scriptures, especially at the second council of Vallabhi held in 453 AD.

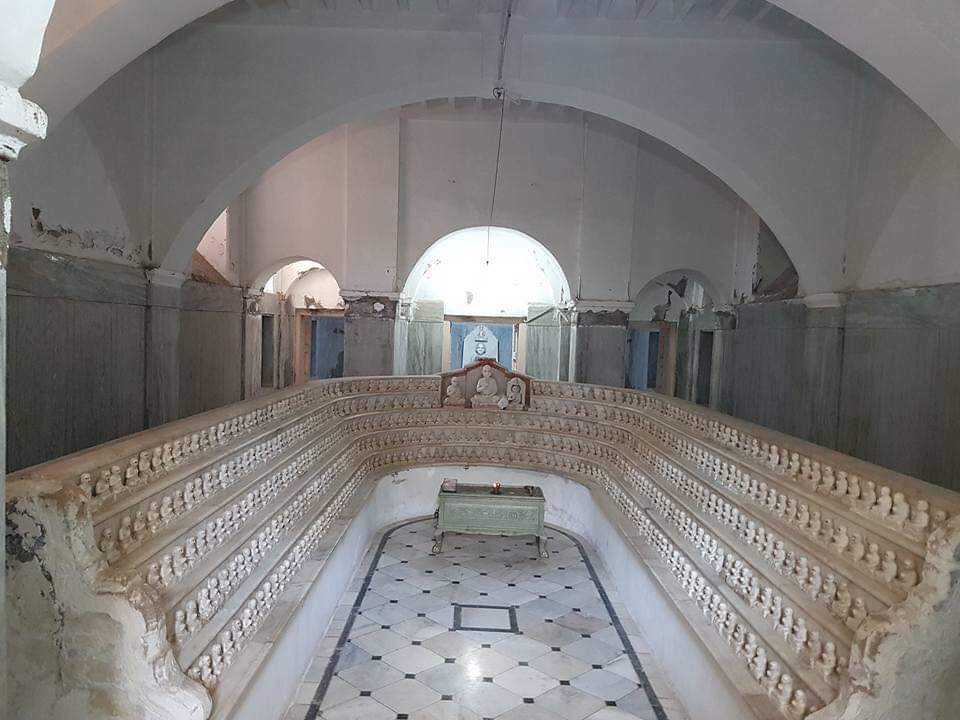
Sculptural depiction of the second Vallabhi Council with Acharya Devardhigani Kshamashraman in the center and other Jain monks surrounding him and writing the canonical scriptures.

During a period of crisis caused by a 12-year long famine and gradual loss of knowledge among ascetics, he led efforts to preserve scriptural knowledge and systematically compile texts. Under his leadership, the Jain community united to safeguard the integrity of their scriptures, preventing division and ensuring the continuity of Jain teachings.

At the beginning of the Vallabhi Council, Devardhigani sat with shramans (Jain monks) and listened to the canonical texts and memorized them all and scripted them systematically and in an organized fashion. As a result of the first council of Vallabhi and the Mathura council, there were two different set of texts, "Skandili" and "Nagarjuniya". Acharya Kalak-IV was representing the "Nagarjuniya text", whereas Devardhigani was representing the "Skandili text". Both these sets of canonical texts had variations because Acharya Skandilsuri (author of Skandili text) and Acharya Nagarjunsuri (author of Nagarjuniya text) had never met before or during the compilation and writing. Both the texts were written simultaneously as the first council of Vallabhi and the Mathura council were held simultaneously during the same period. Variations in the two texts had almost led to an imminent division of the Jain sangha itself. Devardhigani was noble enough to note the variations between both the texts. Acharya Kalak also co-operated with him. The urgency about the loss of canonical texts was recognized by him and a simultaneous writing of canonical texts was successfully accomplished under his leadership.

However, the texts compiled under his guidance were completely rejected by the Digambara sect. These texts were, however, accepted partially by monks and followers of the Yapaniya sect.

The canonical texts written and edited under his leadership at Vallabhi have been accepted as the oldest works of Jain literature, with the Ācārāṅga Sūtra being accepted as the oldest among others such as Sutrakritanga Sutra and the Uttaradhyayana Sutra.

== Legacy ==
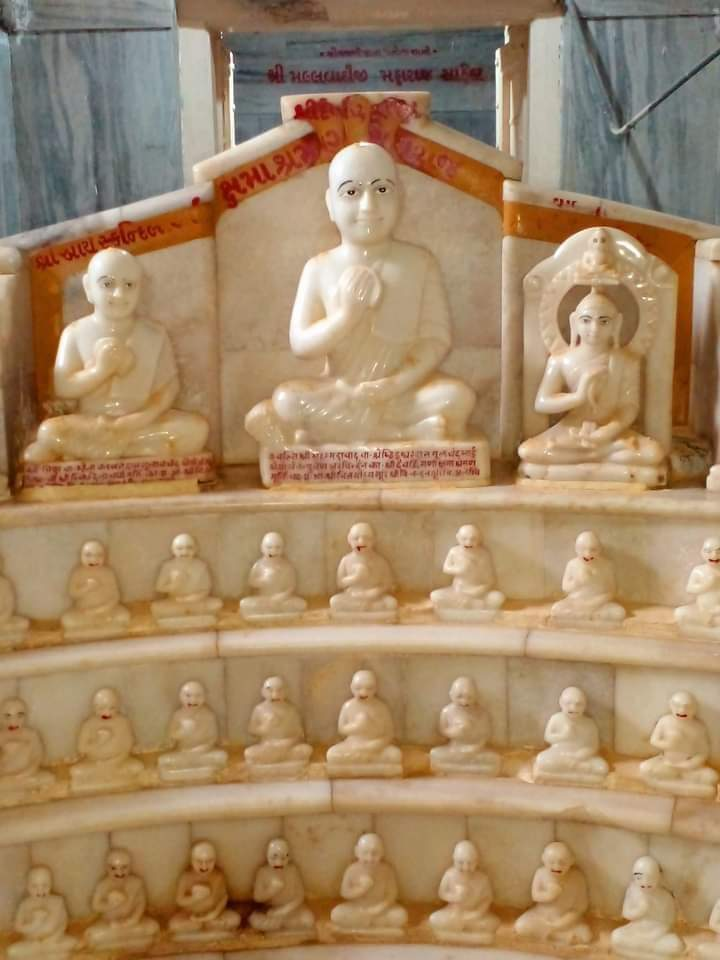
Devardhigani Kshamashraman with other Jain monks at the second Vallabhi council held in 453 AD

One of the texts that mention him is the Pattavali, in the second section of the Kalpa Sūtra, which is both an account and a praise of all the early Śvetāmbara Jain acharyas. The penultimate verse pays homage to them in the first person, and the last verse celebrates Devardhigani. It is as follows-

Sutt’-attha-rayaṇa-bharie
khama-dama-maddava-guṇehi sampanne
Deviḍḍhi-khamāsamaṇe
Kāsava-gotte paṇivayāmi

- Kalpa Sūtra Sthavirāvalī, final verse The above text, translated into English:-

I revere the Kṣamāśramaṇa Devarddhi of the Kāśyapa gotra, who wears, as it were, the jewel of the right understanding of the Sūtras and possesses the virtues of patience, self-restraint and clemency.

- Kalpa Sūtra Sthavirāvalī, final verse (Translated by Hermann Jacobi in 1884) Devardhigani's legacy extends beyond his scholarly achievements and is visible in the aagams (canonical texts) edited and written under his guidance. His dedication to preserving Jain scriptures and fostering unity within the community laid the groundwork for future generations of scholars and practitioners as the canonical texts form the basis of major Jain texts such as the Trishashti-Shalakapurusha-Charitra. His spiritual teachings continue to inspire Jain followers worldwide. With his death in 473 AD, the tradition of passing of scriptural knowledge orally came to an end as all canonical texts had been written.

== Sources ==
- Jain, Prof. Sagarmal. "Contributions of Jain Acharyas to Jainism." Bharatiya Jnanpith.
- Vijaya Ratnaprabh. "Sthaviravali."
- Shah, Sudhir M. "Understanding of Jain Way of Life Exhibition."
