= Shiladitya of Malwa =

6th-century ruler of Malwa, India

Shiladitya of "Mo-la-po" (identified as Malwa) was a 6th-century king of India, known only from the writings of the 7th-century Chinese traveler Xuanzang. Several modern scholars identify this king as the Maitraka king Shiladitya I alias Dharmaditya, although alternative theories exist.

== Xuanzang's description ==
Xuanzang, who visited India during c. 630-644, states that Shiladitya ruled Mo-la-po 60 years before his time. He states that Mo-la-po was located north-west of Po-lu-kie-ch'e-p'o (Bharukachchha). Modern scholars generally identify "Mo-la-po" with Malwa, specifically western or southern Malwa.

Xuanzang states that his information about Shiladitya was derived from the local records. Shiladitya ruled for over 50 years, and was a man of great administrative and intellectual ability. He was caring towards his subjects, ministers, and wives. He practiced non-violence towards all, including animals. He even cared about the life of insects, and ensured that the water given to his horses and elephants was filtered to remove any insects.

Shiladitya built a highly ornamental Buddhist monastery (vihara) beside his palace, and installed the images of the seven Buddhas in it. Every year, he organized an assembly called Moksha mahaparishad, inviting priests and making generous donations to them.

Xuanzang states that the king's subjects loved him, and even 60 years later - during Xuanzang's time - people revered him. He describes the contemporary king Tu-lo-po-po-ta (Dhruva-bhata) of Fa-la-pi (Valabhi) as a nephew of Shiladitya.

== Identification ==
One theory identifies Xuanzang's Shiladitya as Shiladitya I alias Dharmaditya, the Maitraka king of Vallabhi. Xuanzang states that Dhruva-bhata ("Tu-lo-po-po-ta"), the contemporary Maitraka king of Vallabhi ("Fa-la-pi"), was a nephew of Shiladitya. Although Shiladitya ruled from Valabhi, his rule apparently extended up to western Malwa, because of which Xuanzang describes him as the ruler of Malwa. Malwa and Vallabhi were likely part of a single Maitraka-ruled kingdom, but Xuanzang may have described them as independent kingdoms because of confusion. According to historian B.P. Sinha, "Mo-la-po" did not refer, but to "Malavaka", a part of present-day Gujarat; the name "Malavaka" appears as the name of a region in the inscriptions of the Maitraka king Dhruva-sena II.

Shiladitya's known dates are 606 CE and 612 CE, and his father Dhara-sena ruled at least until 589 CE. These dates do not align with Xuanzang's statement that Shiladitya ruled 60 years before his own time. The proponents of this theory argue that Xuanzang's statement should not be taken literally.

Historian Radha Kumud Mukherjee identified Shiladitya as a son of the Aulikara king Yashodharman.
