= Jain councils =

Gatherings to revise and redact Jain literature

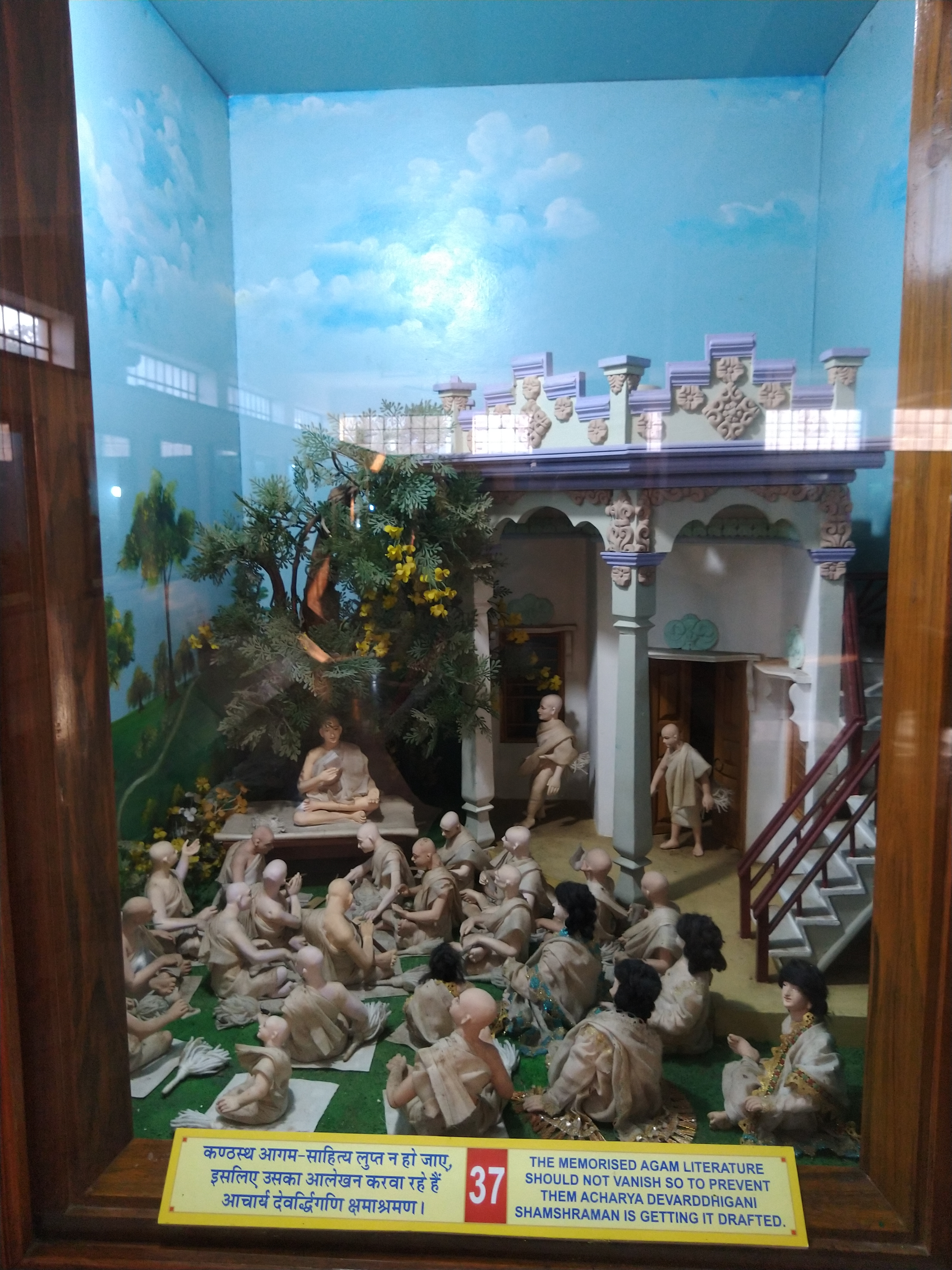
A diorama in Jain Museum of Madhuban depicting Vallabhi council presided by Devarddhigani

There are several Jain councils mentioned in Jain texts associated with revision and redaction of Jain Agamas (sacred texts). The first council was held at Pataliputra. The second councils were probably held simultaneously at Mathura and Vallabhi. The third council was held at Vallabhi under auspices of Devarddhigani Kshamashramana when the texts were written down. The definite dates of councils are not mentioned in the texts before Jinaprabhamuni's Sandehavisausadhi of 1307 CE. The later texts states that the last Vallabhi council was held 980 or 993 years after the death (Nirvana) of last Tirthankara Mahavira (After Vardhamana = AV).

== Councils ==
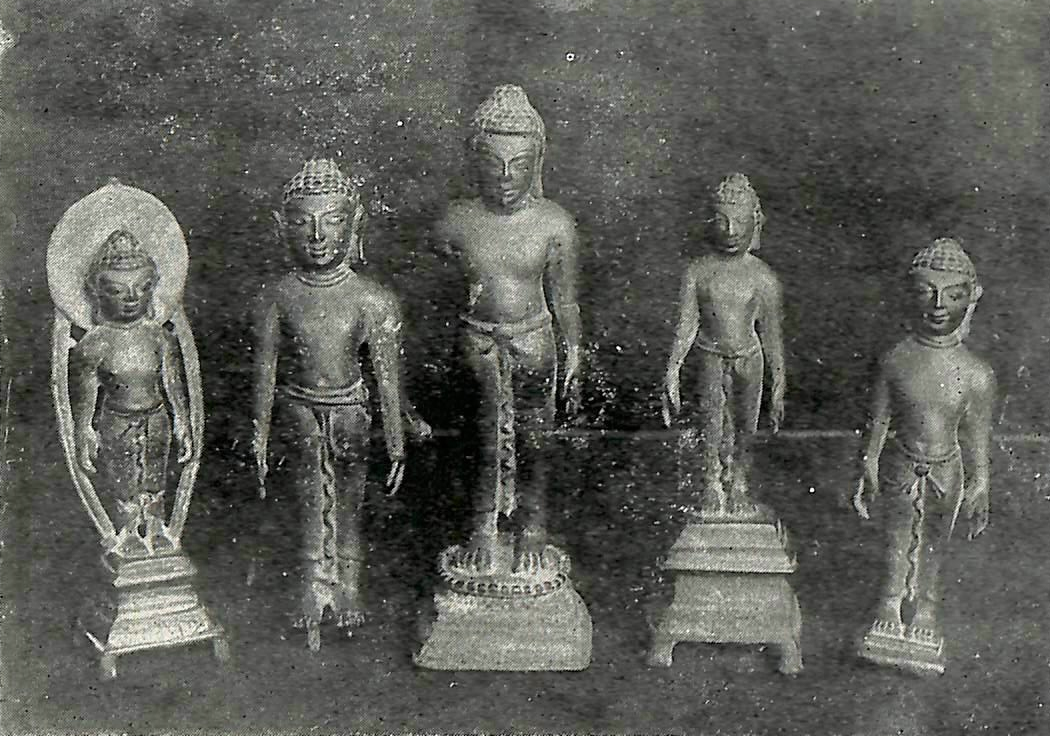
Five Bronzes recovered from Vallabhi

=== Pataliputra Council ===
The first council was held at Pataliputra (now Patna, Bihar, India) in 300 BC, under the patronage of Mauryan king Chandragupta. The Avashyaka-churni (dated between Samvat 650 and 750=593–693 CE) describes: There was twelve years long famine which resulted in the monks moving to the coast. When the famine ended, they gathered at Pataliputra. They gathered the sacred knowledge and put together the eleven Angas but could not gather the Ditthivada (Drstivada). Bhadrabahu who knew the fourteen Purvas was then in Nepal. The sangha sent emissaries to him and informed to come and teach Dittivada. He refused to come citing that he had undertaken a practise Mahaprana. The emissaries returned and informed the sangha. The sangha sent emissaries again and asked, "What is the punishment for someone who disobeys an order of the sangha?" He replied "That one is to be expelled." He added, " Do not expel me, send intelligent [students], I will teach them."

Hemchandra's Parishishtaparvan, probably based on Avashyaka-churni; also known as Sthaviravali (stories on the lives of elders or Jain patriarchs), contains detailed information about the council and how the knowledge of the Purvas was lost.

=== Mathura Council and Vallabhi Council I ===
The second councils were held simultaneously at Mathura (now in Uttar Pradesh, India) under auspices of Skandila and at Vallabhi (now in Gujarat, India) under auspices of Nagarjuna to continue the transmission of sacred knowledge after famines.

=== Vallabhi Council II ===
The Vallabhi Council was convened by Śvetāmbara Jain monks at Vallabhi (now in Bhavnagar district, Gujarat, India) to reduce down to writing sacred texts (Jain Agama) that had so far been transmitted orally. The council was presided by Devarddhigani Kshamashramana. Vallabhi was then under the Maitraka rule.

== Dates of councils ==
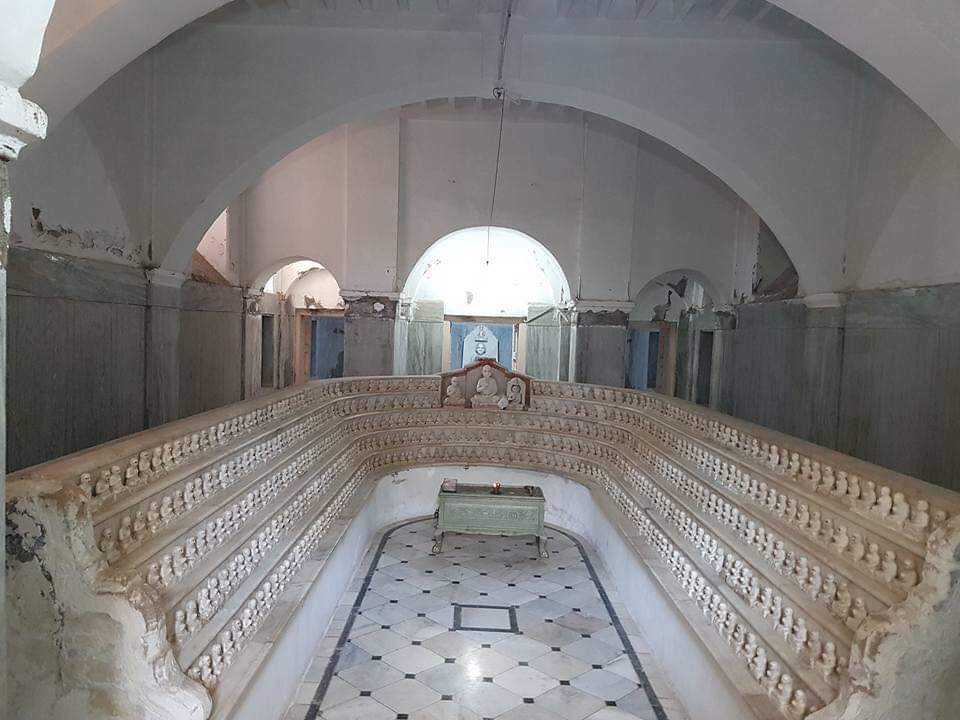
Vallabhi Council, sculptural depiction in a Jain temple at Valabhi

No dates are cited for Pataliputra council in Avashyaka-churni. Hemchandra's Parishishtaparvan (dated Vikram Samvat 1216–1229) states the Pataliputra council was held in 160 AD.

Nandisutra by Devavachaka mentions Skandila and Nagarjuna in Sthaviravali (list of elders) who had organised the sacred texts. It is demonstrated by Jambuvijaya that the text was known to Mallavadin in the fifth century. So the earlier version of it must be older than that. Nandisutra-churni which comments on it is dated 676 CE. So it is established that Skandila and Nagarjuna existed before 676 CE.

The following sources mentions them in the list of elders but continues the older accounts:

1. Jinadasagani, Nandisutra-curni (676 CE) (plus the Ayara- and Dasasrutaskandha-curnis).
2. Haribhadra (700–770 CE) Laghuvrtti on Nandisutra.
3. Silakka (9th century CE) Ayarattka.
4. Santyacarya Vadivetala (d. Samvat 1096 [1039]?), Sisyahita on Uttaradhyayana.
5. Hemachandra (1088–1172 CE), Yogashastra commentary.
6. Malayagiri (c. 1093–1193 CE) tika on the Prakirnaka entitled Joisakarandaga.

The Kalpasutra (Kalpasutra, Jinacaritra, section 148) mentions redaction dates of 980 AV or 993 AV but does not mentions places or persons. Bhadresvara's (c. 1150–1200 CE) Kahavali is not considered as reliable source for date though it contains tales mentioned in earlier literature. Jinaprabhamuni's (1307 CE) Sandehavisausadhi, commentary on Kalpasutra, was the first indication of associating 980 AV with Vallabhi Council but also cite other possibilities.

The 980 AV or 993 AV dates are associated with these events in Sandehavisausadhi:

1. The Vallabhi council under the presidency of Devarddhigani where redaction carried out.
2. The council of Mathura under the presidency of Skandila who seems to have revised the sacred knowledge.
3. The public reading of the Kalpasutra before king Dhruvasena to relieve him from grief of death of his son.
4. The change of last day of Paryusana by Kalakacharya from the fifth to the fourth day of Bhadrapada month.

The following late sources associates 980 or 993 AV with Vallabhi council:

1. Vinayavijaya (1559 CE) Subodhika, commentary on Kalpasutra.
2. Dharmasagara (1571 CE), Kiranavali or Vyakhanapaddhati commentary on Kalpasutra.
3. Samayasundara (c. 1630 CE), Samacarishataka.
4. Samayasundara (1642 CE), Kalpalata, commentary on Kalpasutra.
5. Laksmivallabha ( 1835 CE) Kalpadruma, commentary on Kalpasutra.

== See also ==
- Jain schools and branches
