= Valabhi University =

Buddhist learning centre

Valabhi University was an important centre of Buddhist learning and championed the cause of Hinayana Buddhism between 600 CE and 1400 CE. Valabhi was the capital of the Maitraka empire during the period 480-775 CE. It was an important port for international trade located in Saurashtra, present-day it is called Valabhi located in Bhavnagar district of Gujarat in western India, identical with the old state of Vala. Yijing, a Chinese traveler had observed that the education given at Valabhi was comparable to the education provided at Nalanda, in Bihar, in the field of education. In September 2017, the Indian central government started to consider a proposal to revive the ancient university. A proposal, under the umbrella of an organisation called Sanghkaya, was sent to the central government, which the Union ministry of culture has agreed.

== Curriculum ==
Though Valabhi is known to have championed the cause of Nikaya Buddhism (particularly of the Pudgalavada Sammitiya school), it was neither exclusive nor insular. Brahmanical sciences were also taught here along with the doctrines of Buddhism. References have been found to Brahmanic students who came to learn at this university. Apart from religious sciences, courses offered include:

1. Nīti (Political Science, Statesmanship)
2. Vārtā (Business, Agriculture)
3. Administration
4. Religious thought and Philosophy (especially Buddhist philosophy)
5. Law
6. Economics and Accountancy

Students graduating from Valabhi were usually employed by kings to assist in the government of their kingdoms.

== Fame and influence ==
The prominence of Valabhi was known over the whole of Northern India. Kathasaritsagara narrates the story of a Brahmana, who was determined that he would rather send his son to Valabhi, than to Nalanda or Banaras. Gunamati and Sthiramati were two of its Panditas; very little is known about the other famous teachers and scholars who lived here. It is quite certain that a stamp of approval of doctrines preached by various scholars by the Panditas of Valabhi, who were of authority, was valued highly in learned assemblies of many kingdoms. Valabhi was visited by Xuanzang, a Chinese pilgrim, in the 7th century and by Yijing towards the end of the century. Yijing described the university as at par with the Buddhist monastic centre Nalanda.

== Administration and finance ==
When Xuanzang visited the university in the middle of the 7th century, more than 6000 monks were studying in the place. Some 100 monasteries were provided for their accommodation. The citizens of Valabhi, many of whom were rich and generous, made available the funds necessary for running the institution. The Maitraka kings, who ruled over the country, acted as patrons to the university. They provided enormous grants for the working of the institution and equipping its libraries.
