= Vallabhi =

Vallabhi Vallabhipur
- Town
- Location within Gujarat
- Coordinates: 21.8878°N 71.8795°E
- Country: India
- State: Gujarat
- Region: Saurashtra
- District: Bhavnagar
- Founder: Maharaja Kanak sen

Population (2011)
  - Total: 15,852

Languages
  - Official: Gujarati
- Time zone: UTC+5:30 (IST)
- PIN: 364310
- Vehicle registration: GJ-04

Vallabhi (or Valabhi or Valabhipur) is an ancient city located in the Saurashtra peninsula of Gujarat, near Bhavnagar in western India. It is also known as Vallabhipura and was the capital of the Kingdom of Valabhi, an early medieval state ruled by the Chandravanshi Maitraka Dynasty.

== History ==
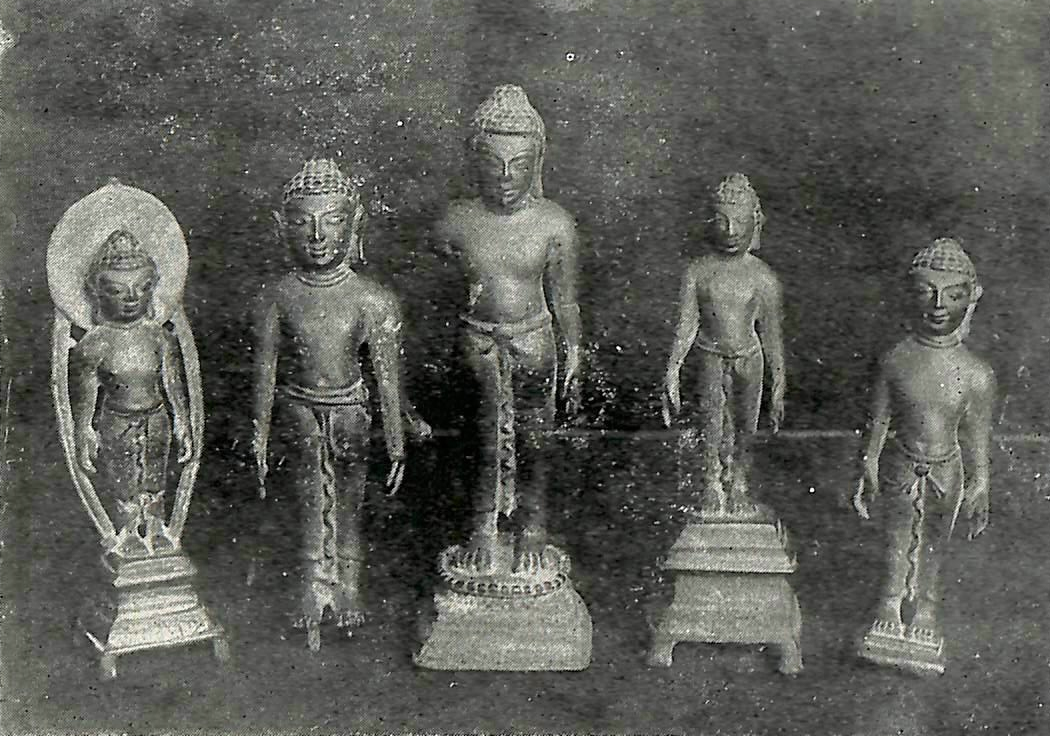
Five Bronzes recovered from Valabhipur

Vallabhi was occupied as early as the Harappan period, and was later part of the Maurya Empire from about 322 BCE until 185 BCE.

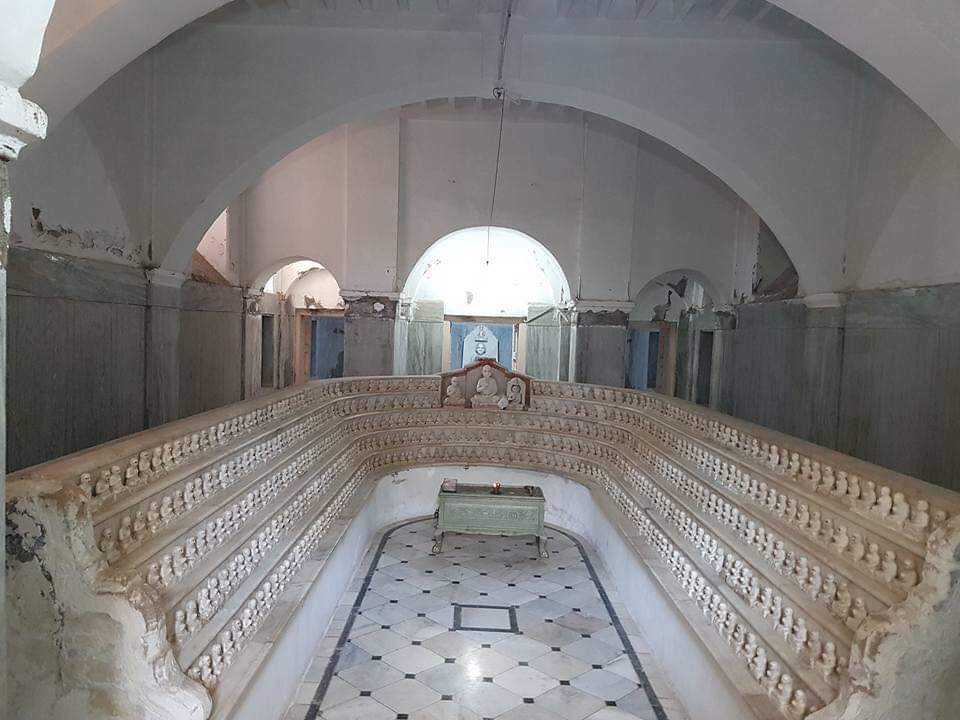
Sculptural depiction of the second Vallabhi Council with Acharya Devardhigani Kshamashraman in the center and other Jain monks surrounding him and writing the canonical scriptures at Vallabhi.

The Satavahana dynasty ruled the area, off and on, from the late second century BCE until the early third century CE. The Gupta Empire held the area from approximately 319 CE to 467 CE.

The Great Council of Vallabhi, was held under Devardhigani Kshamashraman's guidance to preserve the remaining canonical texts of Jainism. there in 454 CE, during the decline of the Gupta Empire.

In the fifth century (CE), the first two Maitraka rulers, Bhatarka and Dharasena I, only used the title of Senapati (general). The third ruler, Dronasimha (Dronasena), declared himself Maharaja (literally "Great King"). King Guhasena came after him. Unlike his predecessors, the king stopped using the term Paramabhattaraka Padanudhyata alongside his name, a term that denotes nominal allegiance to the Gupta overlords. He was succeeded by his son Dharasena II, who used the title Mahadhiraja. The next ruler was his son, Siladitya-I Dharmaditya, who was described by the Chinese scholar and traveller Xuanzang as a "monarch of great administrative ability and of rare kindness and compassion". Siladitya I was succeeded by his younger brother Kharagraha I.

During the time of Kharagraha I, a copperplate grant was found from 616 CE that shows that his territories included Ujjain. During the reign of the next ruler, his son Dharasena III, north Gujarat was assimilated into the kingdom. Dharasena II was succeeded by another son of Kharagraha I, Dhruvasena II, Baladitya. He married the daughter of Harshavardhana and their son Dharasena IV assumed the imperial titles of Paramabhattaraka Mahrajadhiraja Parameshvara Chakravartin and Sanskrit poet Bhatti was his court poet. The next powerful ruler of this dynasty was Siladitya III. After him, Siladitya V ruled, and it is suspected that during his reign, there was an Arab Invasion. The last known ruler of the dynasty was Siladitya VII.

The rule of the Maitrakas is believed to have ended during the second or third quarter of the eighth century when the Arabs invaded.

== List of Rulers ==
1. Senāpati Bhaṭārka (c. 470-c. 492)
2. Senāpati Dharasena I (c. 493-c. 499)
3. Drona Sen (title: Maharaja) (c. 500-c. 520)
4. Dhruva Sen I (520-550 AD)
5. Dhanapatta Sen (550-556 AD)
6. Graha Sen (556-570 AD)
7. Dhara Sen II (570-595 AD)
8. Siladitya Sen I (Dharmaditya) (595-615 AD)
9. Kharagraha I (615-626 AD)
10. Dhara Sen III (AD 626-640)
11. Dhruva Sen II (Baladitya) (640-644 AD)
12. Chakravarti Raja Ghana Sen IV (Titles: Parambhattarak, Maharajadhiraja, Parameshwar) (644-651 AD)
13. Dhruva Sen III (651-655 AD)
14. Khagraha Sen II (655-658 AD)
15. Siladitya Sen II (658-685 AD)
16. Siladitya Sen III (690-710 AD)
17. Siladitya Sen IV (710-740 AD)
18. Siladitya Sen V (740-762 AD)
19. Siladitya Sen VI (Dhruvatta) (762-776 AD)

== Valabhi inscriptions ==
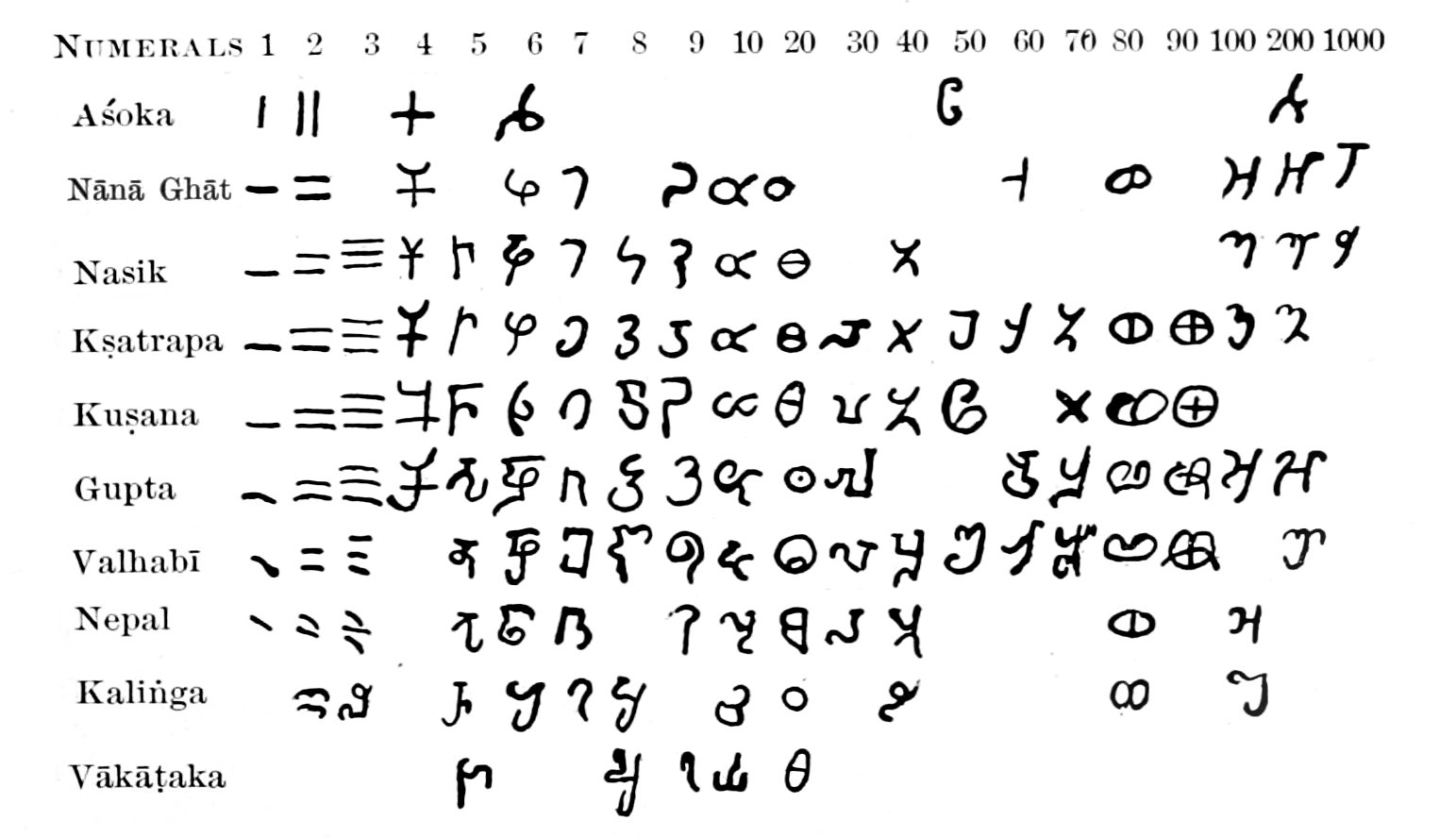
Evolution of Brahmi numerals from the time of Ashoka, including the numerals from the Valahbi inscriptions c. 600 CE.

Religious inscriptions are known from Valhabi, which were dedicated to the Brahmans as well as the Buddhist and Jains. The Indologist Sylvain Lévi wrote an article entitled "Les donations religieuses des rois de Valhabi".

The numerals used in the Valhabi inscriptions and on their coins, dated to c. 600 CE, are often mentioned as an intermediary step in the evolution of Hindu-Arabic numerals.

== See also ==
- Vala State
- Valabhi University
