= Mahavihara =

Buddhist term for a great temple or monastery

Mahavihara (Mahāvihāra) is the Sanskrit and Pali term for a great vihara (centre of learning or Buddhist monastery) and is used to describe a monastic complex of viharas. It is found in and around the Indian subcontinent, predominantly in present-day Bihar, Bengal and Sri Lanka.

== Mahaviharas of Bihar, India ==
A range of monasteries grew up in what is now the modern Indian state of Bihar. According to Tibetan sources, five great mahaviharas stood out during the Pāla period: Vikramashila, the premier university of the era; Nalanda, past its prime but still illustrious, Somapura, Odantapura, and Jaggadala. The five monasteries formed a network; "all of them were under state supervision" and there existed "a system of co-ordination among them . . it seems from the evidence that the different seats of Buddhist learning that functioned in eastern India under the Pāla were regarded together as forming a network, an interlinked group of institutions," and it was common for great scholars to move easily from position to position among them.

=== Nalanda ===
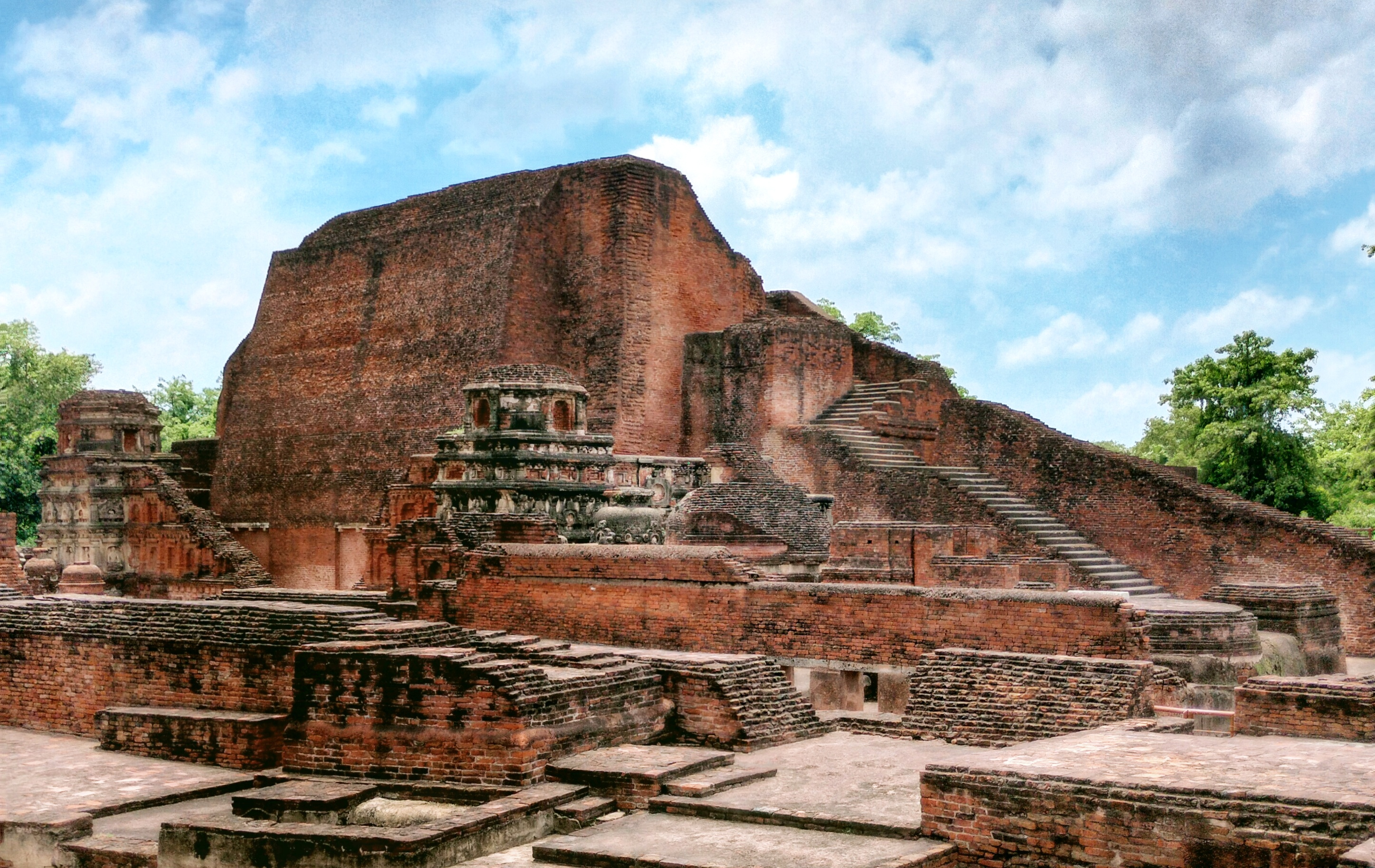
The ruins of Nalanda Mahavihara

The famous Nalanda Mahavihara was founded a few centuries earlier in Rajagriha; Xuanzang speaks about its magnificence and grandeur. Reference to this monastery is found in Tibetan and Chinese sources. During the Pāla period, Nālānda was less singularly outstanding, as other Pālā establishments "must have drawn away a number of learned monks from Nālānda when all of the . . came under the aegis of the Pālās." Nonetheless, the fame of this monastery lingered even after the Pala period.

=== Odantapuri ===
Odantapuri, also called Odantapura or Uddandapura, was a Buddhist vihara in what is now Bihar, India. It was established by King Gopala of the Pala dynasty in the 7th century. It is considered the second oldest of India's universities and was situated in Magadh. Currently it is known as the Bihar Sharif city (Headquarters of Nalanda District). Acharya Sri Ganga of Vikramashila had been a student here. According to the Tibetan records there were about 12,000 students at Odantapuri. Odantpuri was situated at a mountain called Hiranya Prabhat Parvat and the bank of the river Panchanan.

=== Vikramashila ===
Reference to a monastery known as Vikramashila is found in Tibetan records. The Pala ruler Dharmapala was its founder. The exact site of this vihara is at Antichak, a small village in Bhagalpur district (Bihar). The monastery had 107 temples and 50 other institutions providing room for 108 monks. It attracted scholars from neighbouring countries.

== Mahaviharas of Bangladesh ==
=== Somapura ===
Somapura Mahavihara was located at Paharpur, 46.5 km to the north-west of Mahasthangarh in Bangladesh. The available data suggests that the Pala ruler Dharmapala founded the vihara. It followed the traditional cruciform plan for the central shrine. There were 177 individual cells around the central courtyard. There were central blocks in the middle of the eastern, southern and western sides. These might have been subsidiary chapels. It was the premier vihara of its kind and its fame lingered till the 11th century CE.

=== Jagaddala ===
Jagaddala Mahavihara was a Buddhist monastery and seat of learning in Varendra, a geographical unit in present north Bengal. It was founded by the later kings of the Pāla dynasty, probably Ramapala (c. 1077 – c. 1120), most likely at a site near the present village of Jagdal in Dhamoirhat Upazila in the north-west Bangladesh on the border with India, near Paharapur.

=== Shalban Vihara ===
also known as Bhavadev Bihar is another large monastery which flourished between 7th to 12th centuries AD. Located in Comilla, Bangladesh, it was established by King Bhava Deva in the Lalmai Hills Ridge.

== Mahavihara of Anuradhapura, Sri Lanka ==
The Anuradhapura Maha Viharaya (Pali for "Great Monastery") was an important monastery for Theravada Buddhism in Sri Lanka. It was founded by king Devanampiya Tissa (247–207 BCE) in his capital Anuradhapura. The Cūlavamsa written during the European Middle Ages by a monk called Dhamma-kitti, says that king Mahāsena (277-304 AD) had the Mahavihara destroyed by devotees of the Abhayagiri vihara. His son Sirimeghavanna restores the Mahavihara to its former glory. The Mahavihara was the place where the Mahavihara orthodoxy was established by monks such as Buddhaghosa. The traditional Theravadin account provided by the Mahavamsa stands in contrast to the writings of the Chinese Buddhist monk Faxian (Ch. 法顯), who journeyed to India and Sri Lanka in the early 5th century (between 399 and 414 CE). He recorded that the Mahavihara was not only intact, but housed 3000 monks.

== See also ==
- List of Mahaviharas of Newar Buddhism
- List of Buddhist temples
- Brahma-vihara
- Cetiya
- Chaitya
- Kyaung
- Mahabodhi Temple
- Mahiyangana Raja Maha Vihara
- Pranidhipurna Mahavihar
- Tissamaharama Raja Maha Vihara
- Wat - Buddhist temple in Cambodia, Laos or Thailand.
