= Maitraka dynasty =

Dynasty that ruled western India from c. 475 to 767

Maitrakās
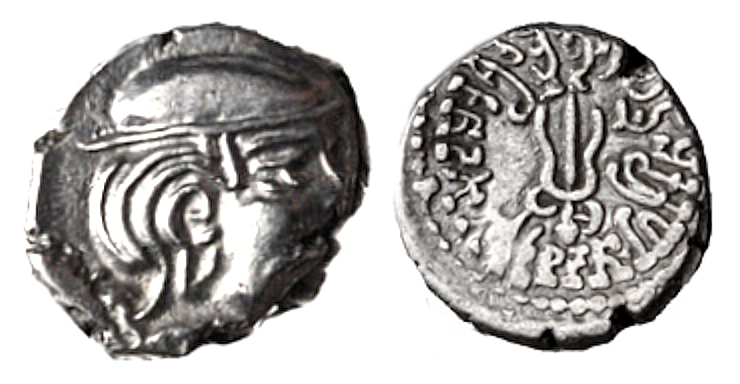
- Silver Drachm of the Maitrakas of Valabhi, late 5th–8th century AD. Obverse: Capped head in Ksatrapa style. Reverse: Trident with Brahmi legend around.
- Country: Kingdom of Valabhi
- Founded: 475
- Founder: Bhatarka
- Final ruler: Siladitya VI
- Seat: Vallabhi
- Titles: Maharajadhiraja of Valabhi
- Dissolution: 776

The Maitraka dynasty ruled the Kingdom of Valabhi in western India from approximately 475 to 776 from their capital at Vallabhi. With the sole exception of Dharapaṭṭa (the fifth king in the dynasty), who is associated with sun-worship, they were followers of Shaivism.

Following the decline of the Gupta Empire, Maitraka dynasty was founded by Senapati (general) Bhaṭārka, who was a military governor of Saurashtra under Gupta Empire, who had established himself as the independent around 475 CE. The first two Maitraka rulers Bhaṭārka and Dharasena I used only the title of Senapati (general). The third ruler Droṇasiṁha declared himself as the Maharaja. During the reign Dhruvasena I, Jain council at Vallabhi was probably held. The next ruler Dharapaṭṭa is the only ruler considered as a sun-worshipper. King Guhasena stopped using the term Paramabhattaraka Padanudhyata along his name like his predecessors, which denotes the cessation of displaying of the nominal allegiance to the Gupta overlords. He was succeeded by his son Dharasena II, who used the title of Mahadhiraja. His son, the next ruler Śilāditya I Dharmāditya was described by Hiuen Tsang, visited in 640 CE, as a "monarch of great administrative ability and of rare kindness and compassion". Śilāditya I was succeeded by his younger brother Kharagraha I. Virdi copperplate grant (616 CE) of Kharagraha I proves that his territories included Ujjain. During the reign of the next ruler, Dharasena III, north Gujarat was included in this kingdom. Dharasena II was succeeded by another son of Kharagraha I, Dhruvasena II, Balāditya. He married the daughter of Harṣavardhana. His son Dharasena IV assumed the imperial titles of Paramabhattaraka Mahrajadhiraja Parameshvara Chakravartin. Sanskrit poet Bhatti was his court poet. The next powerful ruler of this dynasty was Śilāditya II. During the reign of Śilāditya V, Arabs probably invaded this kingdom. The last known ruler of this dynasty was Śilāditya VI.

Maitrakas set up a Vallabhi University which came to be known far and wide for its scholastic pursuits and was compared with the Nalanda University. They came under the rule of Harṣa of Vardhana dynasty in the mid-seventh century, but retained local autonomy, and regained their independence after Harṣa's death. After repeated attacks by Arabs from the sea, the kingdom had weakened considerably. The dynasty ended by 783 CE. Apart from legendary accounts which connect fall of Vallabi with the Tajjika (Arab) invasions, no historical source mention how the dynasty ended.

More than hundred temples of this period are known, mostly located along the western coast of Saurashtra.

== Origin ==
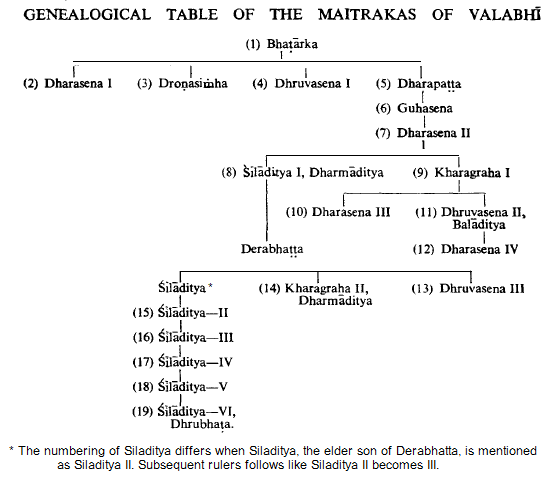
Genealogical Tree of Maitrakas

Early scholars like Fleet had misread copperplate grant and considered Maitrakas as some foreign tribe defeated by Bhaṭārka. Bhagwanlal Indraji believed that Maitrakas were foreign tribe while Bhaṭārka, who defeated them, belonged to the indigenous dynasty. Later readings corrected that Bhaṭārka was himself Maitraka who had succeeded in many battles. The earlier scholars had suggested the name Maitraka is derived from Mithra, the Sun or solar deity, and their supposed connection to Mihira and their sun-worshiping inclination.

Though Mitra and Mihira are synonyms for the sun, the Sanskrit literature does not use it in sense of sun-worshipers. Dharapaṭṭa is the fifth and the only king of all Maitraka kings connected with sun-worship. All other kings were followers of Shaivism.

The copperplate grants do not help in identifying their origin, they describe only that the dynasty was born from a war-like tribe whose capital was at Vallabhi and they were Shaivas. Chinese traveller Hieun-Tsang visited Vallabhi during the second quarter of the 7th century had described the ruler as a Kshatriya. Later Mahayana Buddhist work Manju-Shri-Mula-Kalpa had described them as Varavatya Yadava. The late Jain traditional work Shatrunjaya-Mahatmaya of Dhaneshwara describes Śilāditya as the Yadavas of Lunar race.

Virji concludes that Maitrakas were a Kshatriya of Lunar race and their origin was probably from Mitra dynasty which once ruled region around Mathura (now in Uttar Pradesh, India). Several scholars like Benerjee, D. Shastri, D. R. Bhandarkar agree with her conclusion.

== Vallabhi ==
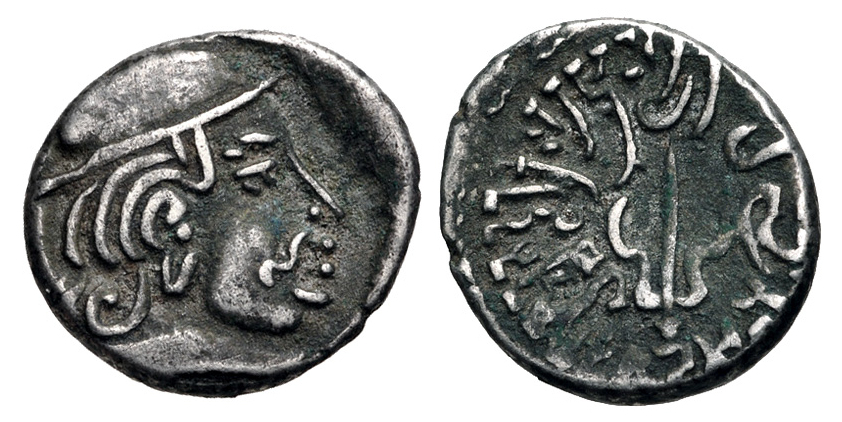
Silver Drachm of Bhaṭārka (Maitrakas of Valabhi). Obverse: Head of the kings facing right. Reverse: Trishula trident (symbol of Shiva) with legend in the Brahmi script: Rájño Mahákshatrapasa Bhatárakasa Mahesara–Śrí Bhaṭṭárakasa "Of the illustrious, the Shaivaite, Bhattaraka, the great king; the great Kshtrapa; the Lord and devotee of Maheshwara."

The Maitrakas ruled from their capital at Vallabhi. They came under the rule of Harṣa in the mid-7th century, but retained local autonomy, and regained their independence after Harṣa's death.

When I-Tsing, another Chinese traveller, visited Vallabhi in the last quarter of the seventh century, he found Vallabhi as a great center of learning including Buddhism. Gunamati and Sthiramati were two famous Buddhist scholars of Vallabhi in the middle of the seventh century. Vallabhi was famous for its liberalism and the students from all over the country, including the Brahmana boys, visited it to have higher education in secular and religious subjects. We are told that the graduates of Valabhi were given higher executive posts.

The Charanas of the region connect themselves with the last Maitraka ruler Śilāditya VI. Goddess Khodiyar is considered a contemporary figure of the period when the Vallabhi kingdom declined in the 8th century AD.

== Religion ==
The Maitrakas were follower of the Shiva except Dhruvasena I who was Vaiṣnava and Dharapaṭṭa who was sun-worshiper. They all used title of parama-maheshwara before the names of king except those two. It is evident from the use of symbols like Nandi, the Bull and Trishula, the trident in their coins and inscriptions. There were presence of Vaishnavism and Goddess worship under their rule. There were large number of Buddhist Viharas in the Maitraka kingdom. Jains held their important Valabhi council here. The Maitrakas were tolerant to all religions and made donations and grants to all of them without partiality.

== See also ==
- Chaulukya dynasty
