= Architecture of Gujarat =

Architectural history of Indian state

The Architecture of Gujarat consists of architecture in the Indian state of Gujarat.

The first major civilization in Gujarat was the Harappan Civilization. Their settlements, including Dholvaira and Lothal are characteristic of Harappan architecture.

Islamic architecture flourished during the rule of the Gujarat Sultanate and Mughal Empire in Gujarat. Buildings were built in European styles, including Gothic and Neoclassical during the British Colonial period. Indo-Saracenic architecture also developed during this period. After independence in 1947, modernist architecture is seen in Gujarat.

== Ancient period ==
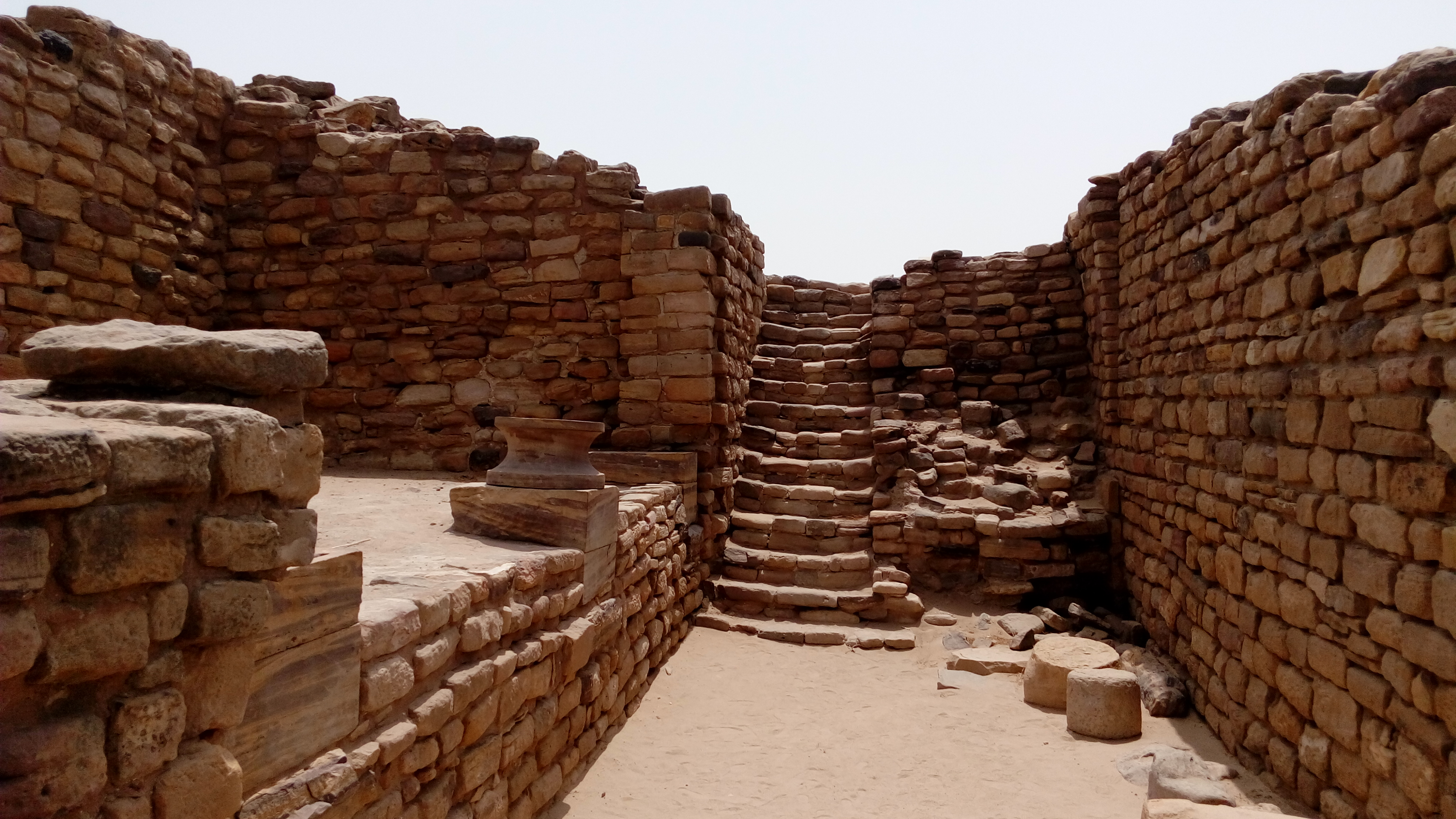
Dholavira, a site from the Indus Valley Civilization.

=== Indus Valley Civilization ===
Gujarat has a large number of archaeological sites associated with the Indus Valley Civilization. The Indus Valley sites in Gujarat include Dholvaira, and Lothal architecture.

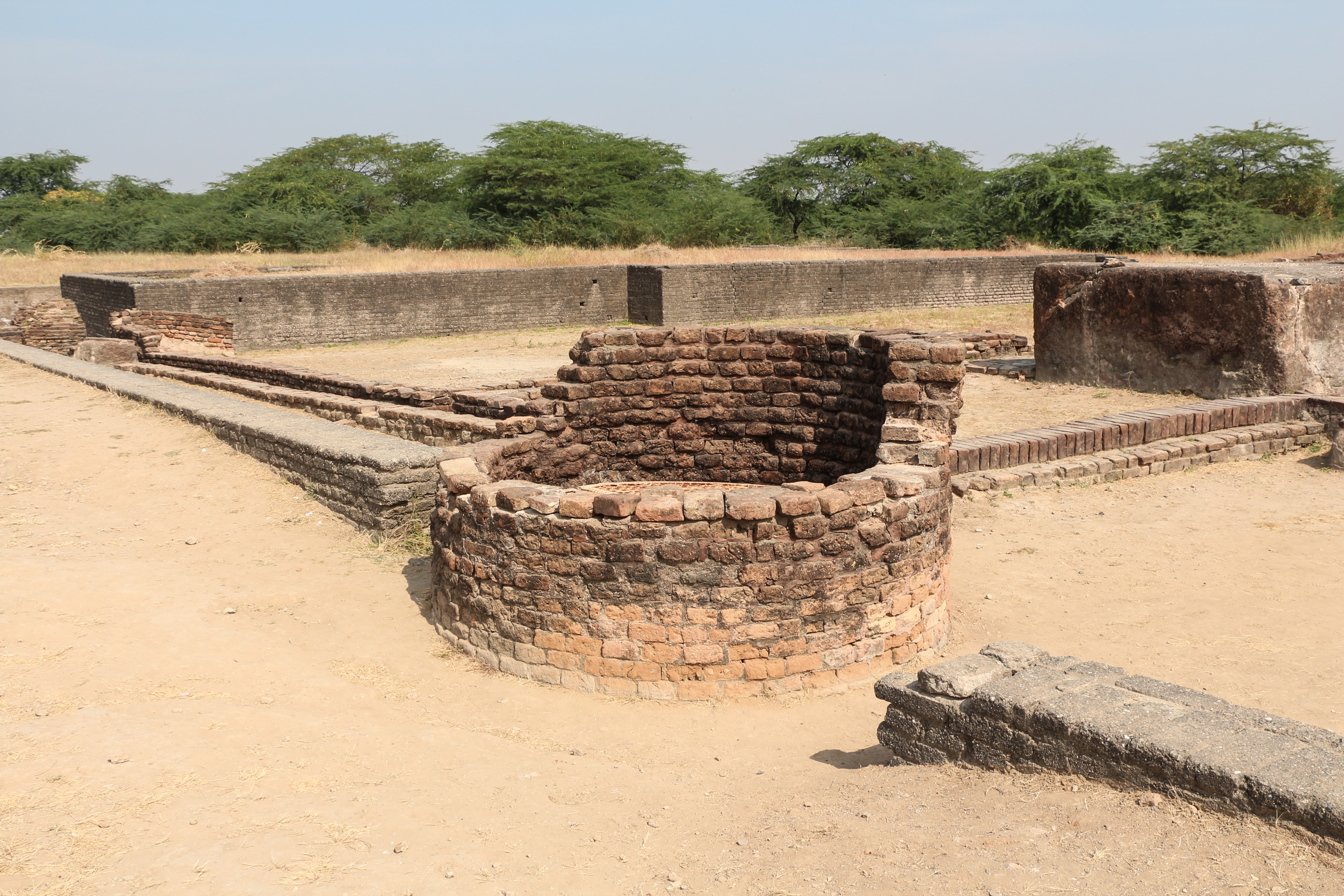
An ancient well at Lothal, and the city drainage canals.

The city of Dholavira has a rectangular shape and organization. Unlike Harappa and Mohenjo-daro, the city was constructed to a pre-existing geometrical plan consisting of three divisions – the citadel, the middle town, and the lower town. The acropolis and the middle town had been furnished with their own defence-work, gateways, built-up areas, street system, wells, and large open spaces.

=== Early Nagara architecture (5th to 10th century) ===
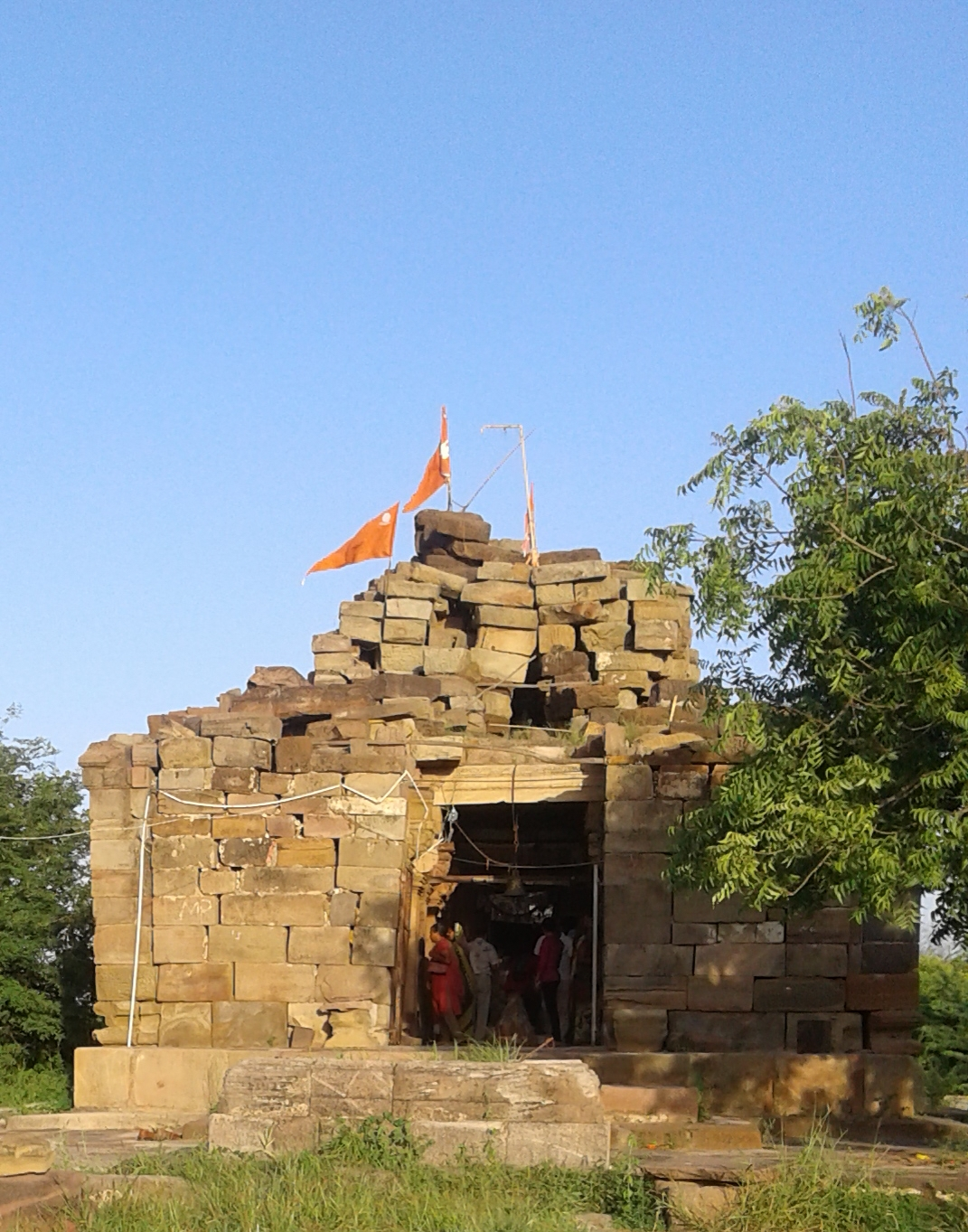
Ruined Shiva temple at Puaranogadh at Manjal, Kutch

The extant temples Early Nagara architecture include the Roda Group of Temples, Lakodra in Vijapur Taluka, old temple at Thangadh, Ranakdevi's Temple at Wadhwan, the Sun Temple at Kanthkot, Shiva temple at Puaranogadh at Manjal in Kutch. Harishchandra-ni-Chori at Shamlaji, older Bhadreshwar Jain Temple (rebuilt now) and the Temple III of Roda Group of Temples are some other extant temples of the 9th century.

=== Saurashtra architecture (5th to 10th century) ===
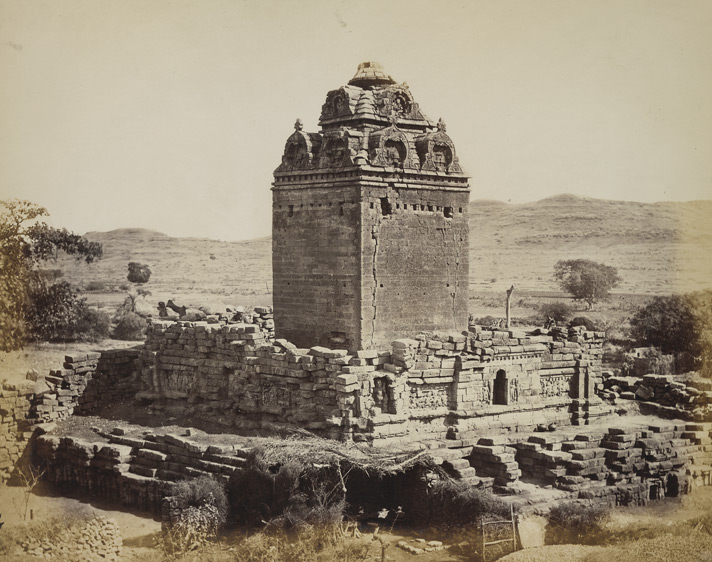
Gop Temple

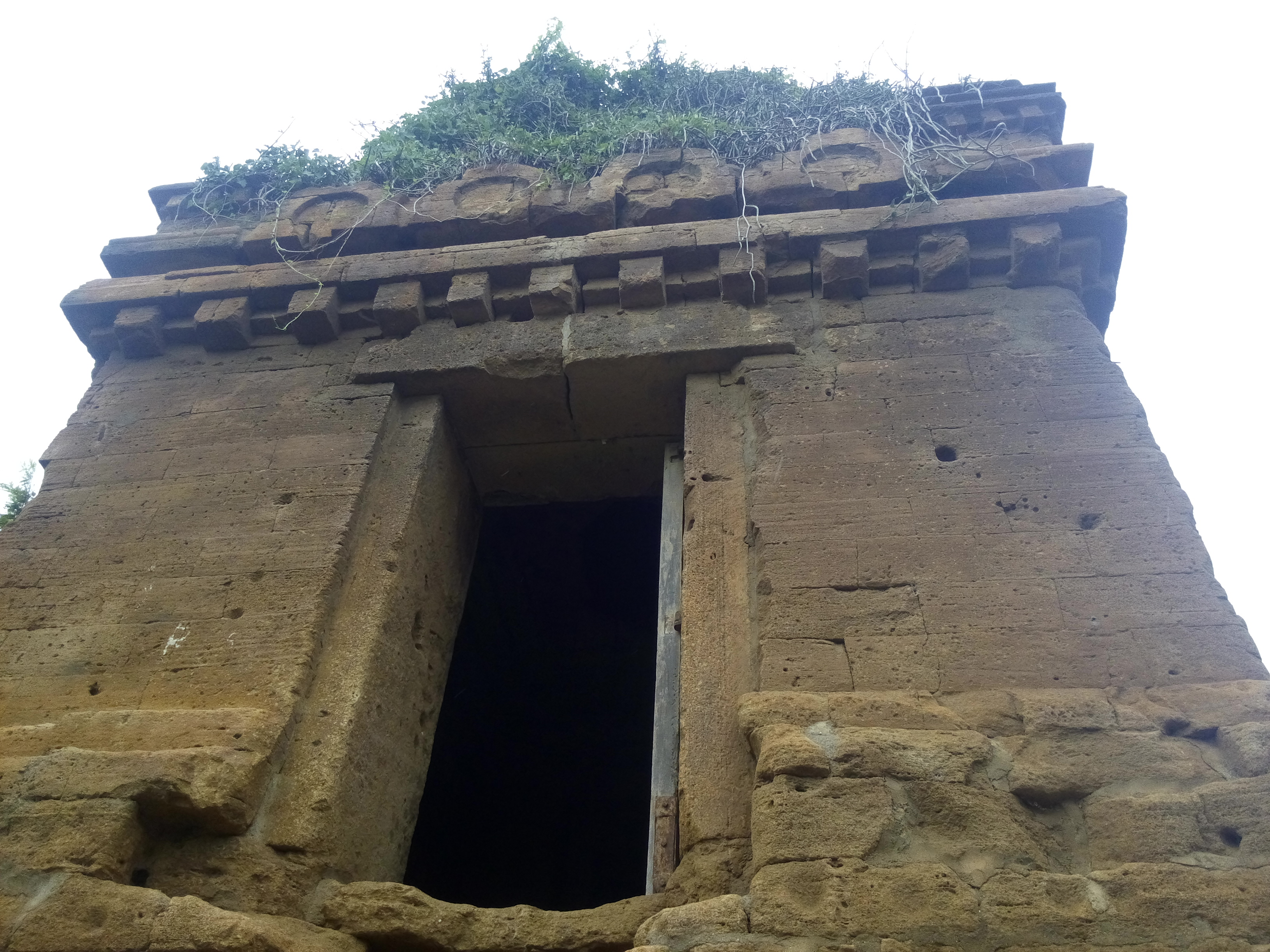
Firangi Deval at Kalsar

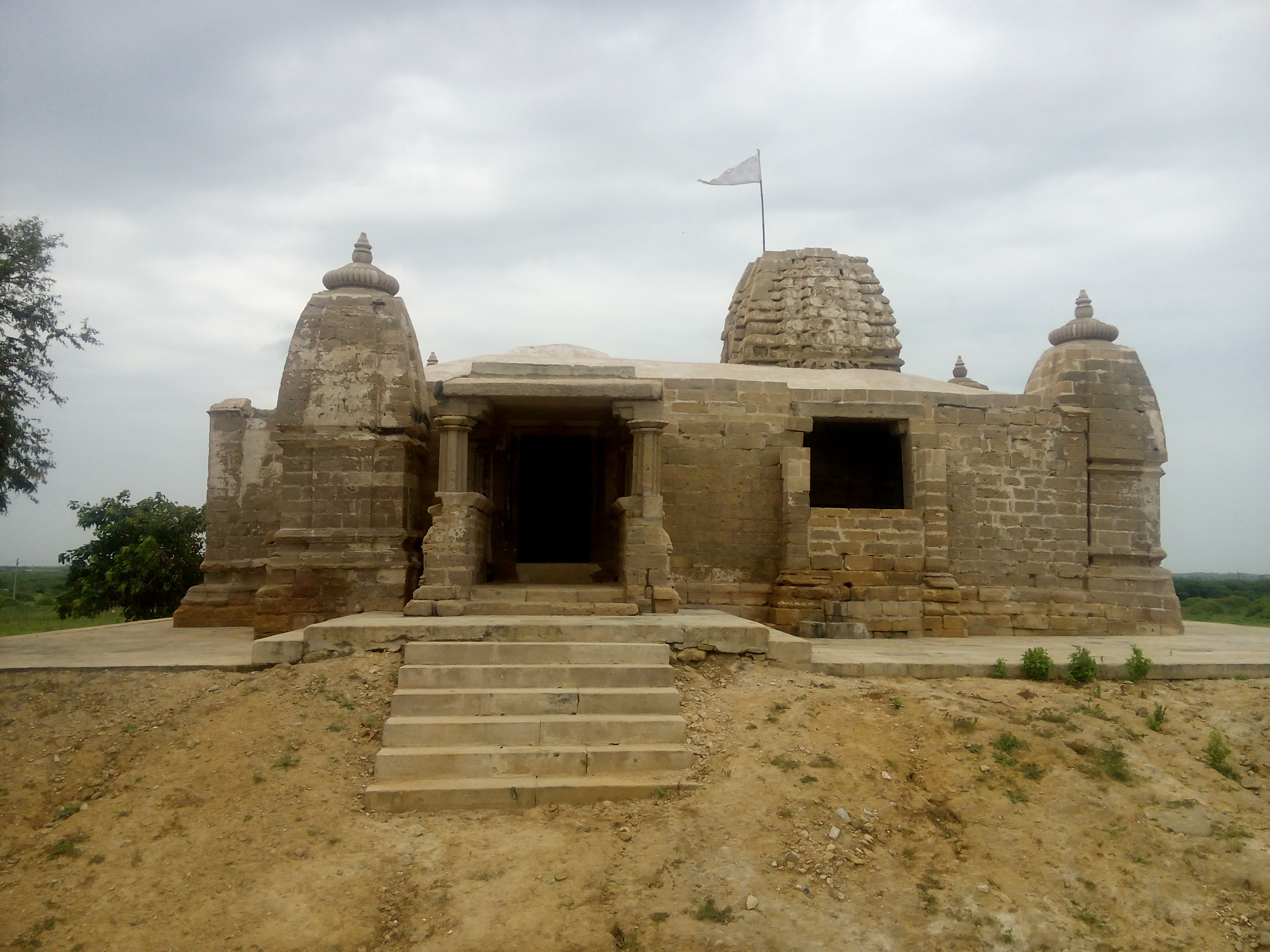
Magderu, Dhrasanvel, Okhamandal

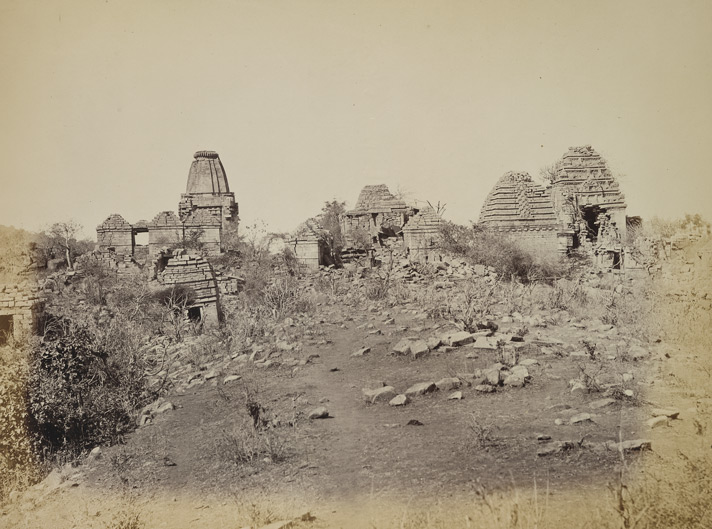
Ruined temples at Sonkansari, Ghumli

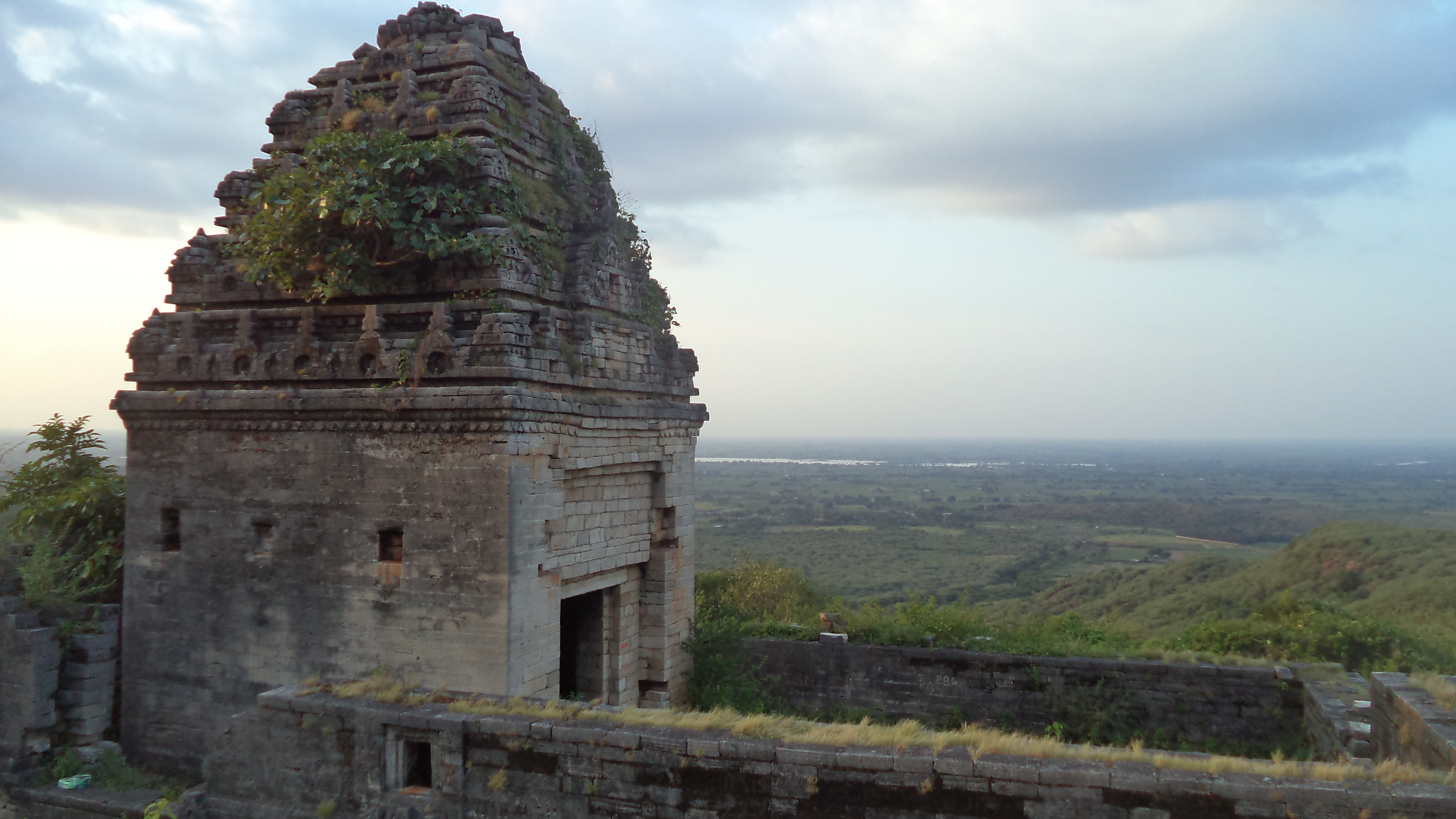
Temple at Sonkansari, Ghumli

The Saurashtra architecture is in continuum of earlier Gupta period architecture found in caves at Uparkot and Khambhalida. More than hundred temples of Maitraka period is known. Almost all of them are located along the coastal belt of the western Saurashtra region except the one at Kalsar and few temples in the Barda hills region. Several temples of them are located in the territories controlled by the Saindhavas.

The extant temples of this period are the temple at Gop, Sonkansari (Ghumli), Pachtar, Prachi, Firangi Deval at Kalsar, group of temples at Vasai near Dwarka, Kadvar, Bileshwar, Sutrapada, Visavada, Kinderkheda, Pata, Miyani, Pindara, Khimrana, two temples at Dhrasanvel (Magderu and Kalika Temple), two temples near Dhrewad (Kalika Mata Temple), Gayatri temple and Naga temple and Sun temple at Pasnavada, early temples at Junagadh, Gosa, Boricha, Prabhas Patan, Savri, Navadra, Suvarnatirth temple at Dwarka, Jhamra, Degam near Porbandar, Sarma near Ghed. Other extant temples include the temple groups at Khimeshwara, Shrinagar, Nandeshwara, Balej, Bhansara, Odadar; and the shrines at Bokhira, Chhaya, Visavada, Kuchadi, Ranavav, Tukada, Akhodar, Kalavad, Bhanvad, Pasthar, and Porbandar.

Two kunds are known of this period, at Kadvar and Bhansara. The Shaivaite monastery at the Khimeshwara group of temples is the oldest known Brahminical monastery of India, preceding three centuries to that in central India.

These temples are austere in their design and simple in decoration. They are important in architectural study to know the origin of Nagara-style shikhara and the beginning of their complex designs in temple architecture. These temples also point to the second of the two early Gujarat temple architecture schools; the north Gujarat early Nagara style and the Saurashtra style which initially influenced and ultimately ousted by the evolving Nagara style. The Saurashtra style disappeared by the tenth century.

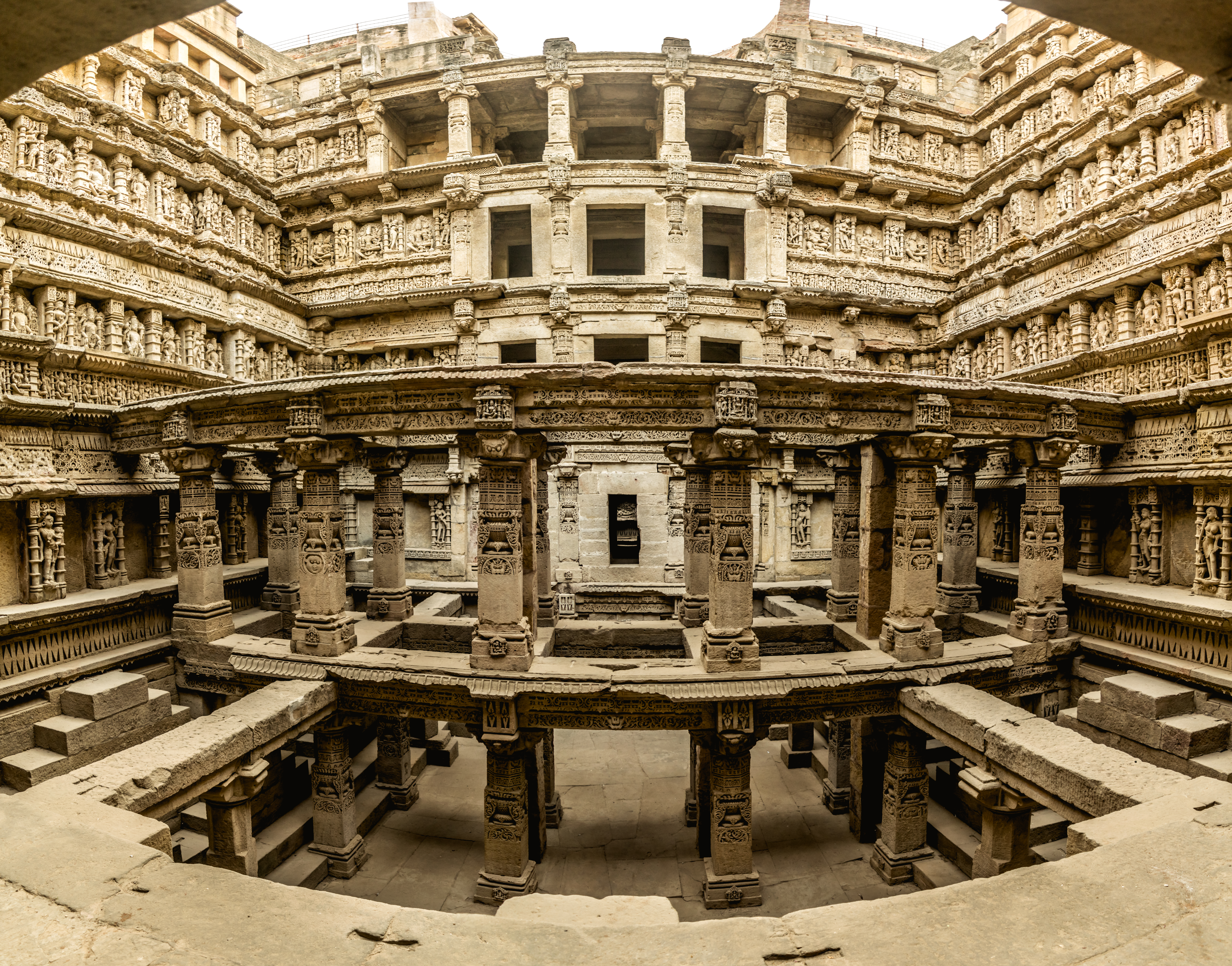
Rani ki Vav

=== Māru-Gurjara architecture (11th to 13th CE) ===
Māru-Gurjara architecture, Chaulukya style or Solaṅkī style, is a style of north Indian temple architecture that originated in Gujarat and Rajasthan from the 11th to 13th centuries, under the Chaulukya dynasty (or Solaṅkī dynasty). On the exteriors, the style is distinguished from other north Indian temple styles of the period in "that the external walls of the temples have been structured by increasing numbers of projections and recesses, accommodating sharply carved statues in niches. These are normally positioned in superimposed registers, above the lower bands of moldings. The latter display continuous lines of horse riders, elephants, and kīrttimukhas. Hardly any segment of the surface is left unadorned." The main shikhara tower usually has many urushringa subsidiary spirelets on it, and two smaller side-entrances with porches are common in larger temples.

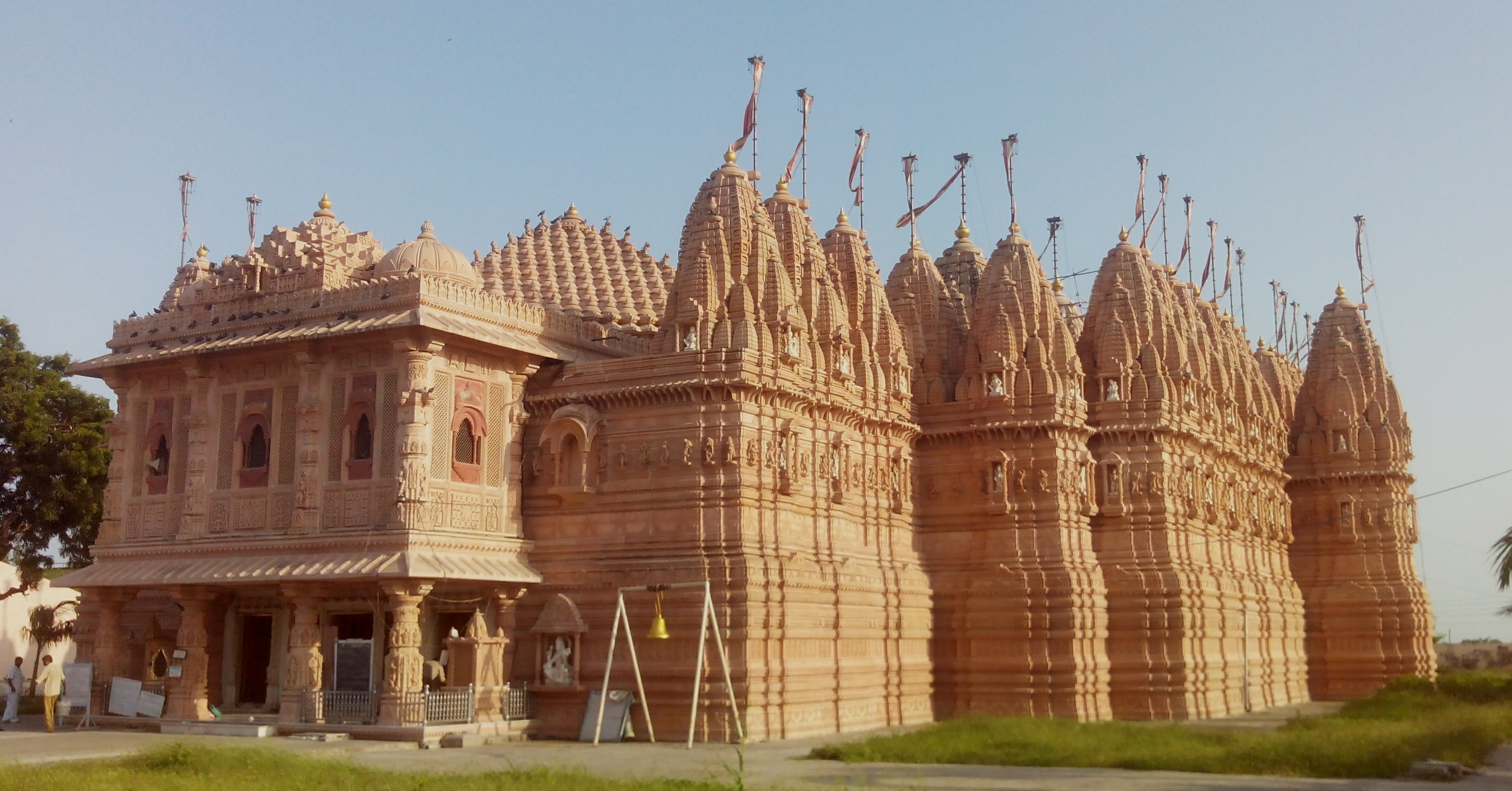
Bhadreshwar Jain Temple, 1248, rebuilt 2010

Examples of Chaulukya or Māru-Gurjara architecture include Taranga Jain temple, Rudra Mahalaya Temple, and Modhera Sun Temple. The Rani ki vav was also built during this period.

== Indo-Islamic architecture ==
The first Muslim dynasty to rule large parts of Gujarat was the Delhi Sultanate in the 14th century. Gujarat would later be ruled by the Mughal empire, Gujarat Sultanate, and several Muslim-ruled princely states until 1947. Thus, Indo-Islamic architecture is found all over the state.

The Indo-Islamic architecture style of Gujarat drew micro-architectural elements from earlier Maru-Gurjara architecture and employed them in mihrab, roofs, doors, minarets and facades. In the 15th century, the Indo-Islamic style of Gujarat is especially notable for its inventive and elegant use of minarets. They are often in pairs flanking the main entrance, mostly rather thin and with elaborate carving at least at the lower levels. Some designs push out balconies at intervals up the shaft; the most extreme version of this was in the lost upper parts of the so-called "shaking minarets" at the Jama Mosque, Ahmedabad, which fell down in an earthquake in 1819. This carving draws on the traditional skills of local stone-carvers, previously exercised on Hindu temples in the Māru-Gurjara and other local styles.

=== Delhi Sultanate ===
The construction during the rule of Delhi Sultanate in Gujarat continued earlier local architecture tradition which has reached in its pinnacle as Maru-Gurjara Architecture. The tradition continued in temples, mosques, residents and civic structures. The local tradition was modified and expanded to suit Islamic believes, rituals and practices. The construction of Islamic ritual buildings such as mosques were codified and standardised. Such codification is found in 15th century Sanskrit treatise, Rahmana-Prasada. One such early example of mosque include the Jami Mosque in Mangrol built in 1383-84.

The notable mosques built during this period include Mosque of Al-Iraji at Junagadh (1286–87), Rahimat Mosque in Mangrol (1382–1383), Jami Mosque of Bharuch (1321), Jami mosque of Khambhat, Bahlol Khan Gazi or Hilal Khan Kazi Mosque (1333) and Tanka Mosque (1361) in Dholka. The tomb of Al-Khazeruni in Khambhat was built in 1333.

=== Gujarat Sultanate ===
Under the Gujarat Sultanate, independent between 1407 and 1543, Gujarat was a prosperous regional sultanate under the rule of the Muzaffarid dynasty, who built lavishly, particularly in the capital, Ahmedabad, in its distinctive style of Indo-Islamic architecture. The sultanate commissioned mosques such as the Jami Masjid of Ahmedabad, Jama Masjid at Champaner, Jami Masjid at Khambhat, Qutbuddin Mosque, Rani Rupamati Mosque, Sarkhej Roza, Sidi Bashir Mosque, Kevada Mosque, Sidi Sayyed Mosque, Nagina Mosque and Pattharwali Masjid, as well as structures such as Teen Darwaza, Bhadra Fort and the Dada Harir Stepwell in Ahmedabad.

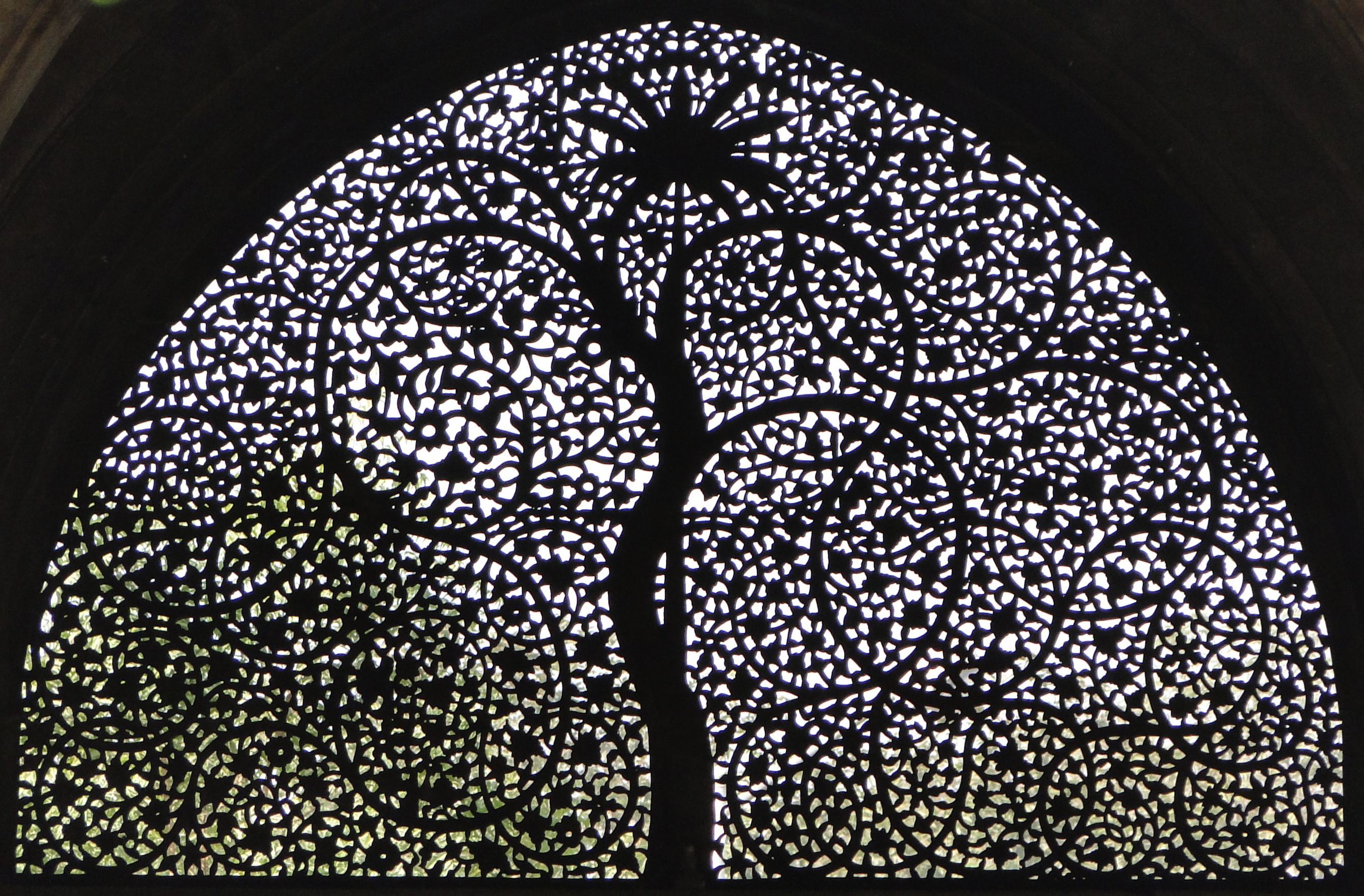
Sidi Saiyyed Mosque Marbel Carvings

The Champaner-Pavagadh Archaeological Park, the 16th century capital of Gujarat Sultanate, documents the early Islamic and pre-Mughal city that has remained without any change.

=== Mughal Empire ===
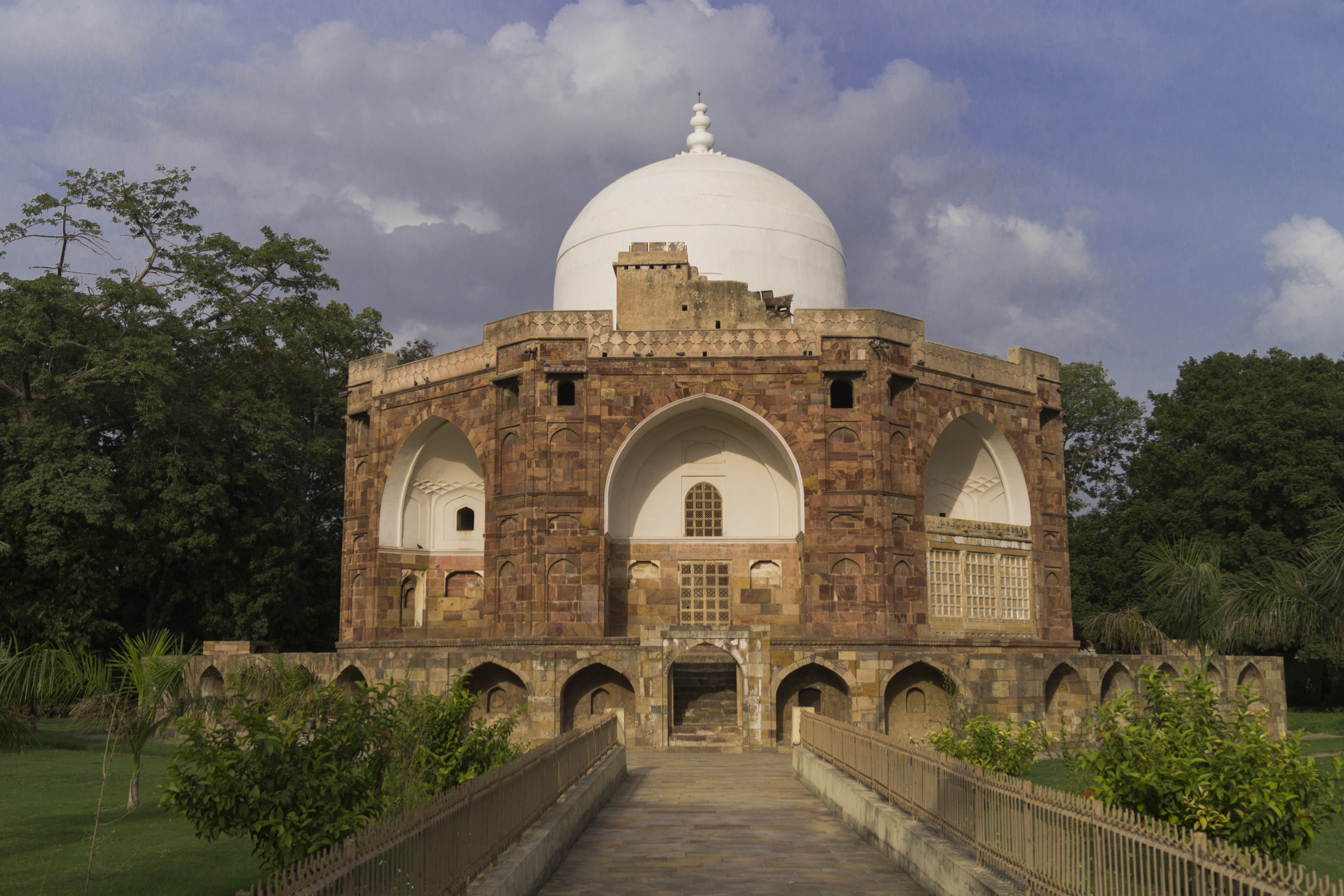
Hazira Maqbara, an example of Mughal architecture

Indo-Islamic architecture style of Gujarat presages many of the architectural elements later found in Mughal architecture, including ornate mihrabs and minarets, jali (perforated screens carved in stone), and chattris (pavilions topped with cupolas).

Mughal architecture in Gujarat includes the Hazira Maqbara in Vadodara, and Mughal Sarai in Surat.

=== Maratha rule ===
The 18th-century Ranchhodrai Temple in Dakor shows influence of Maratha temple architecture in its main cupola.

== British Colonial architecture (1858-1947 CE) ==
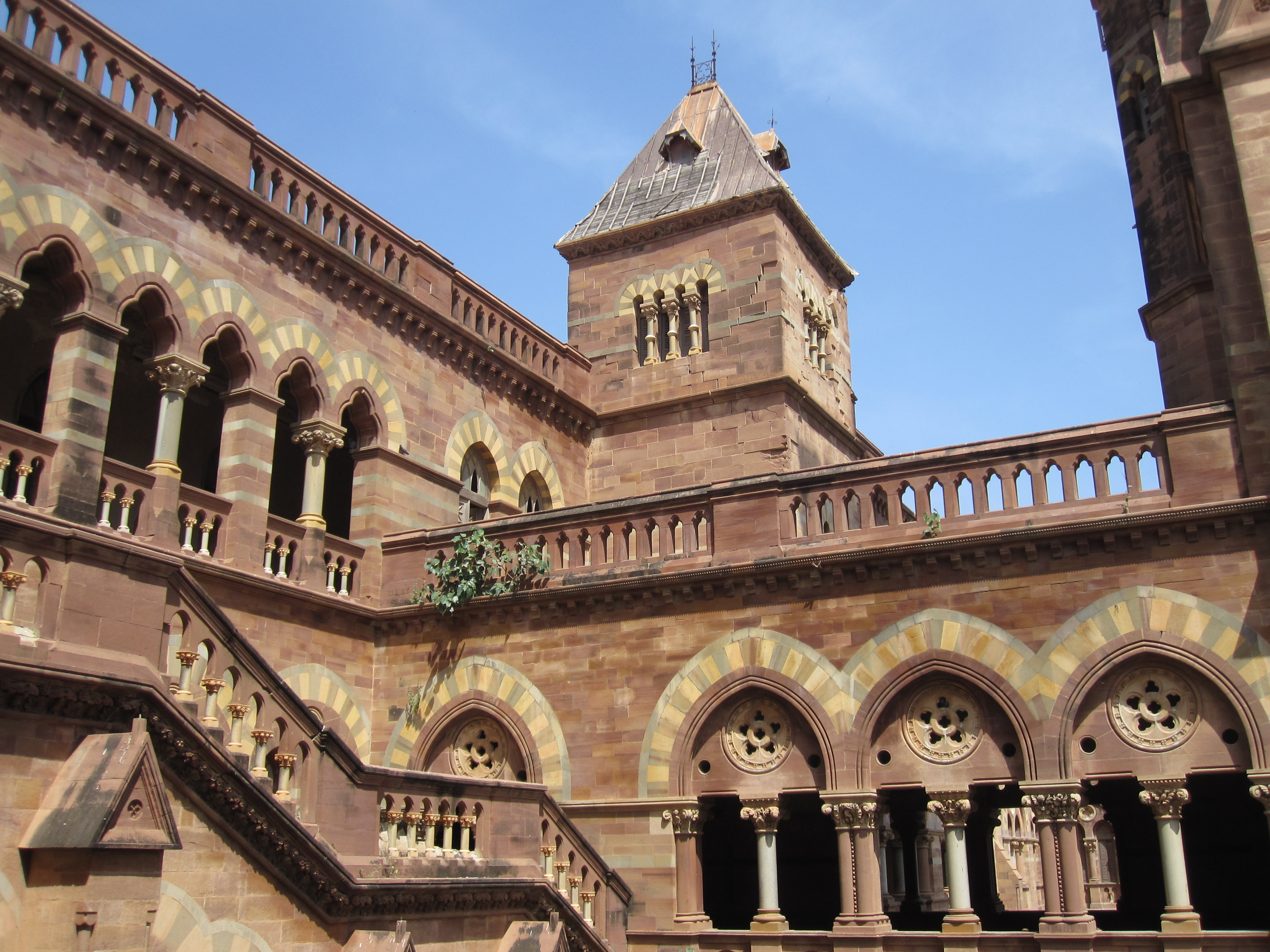
Prag Mahal, completed in 1879, was designed in the Gothic Revival style by Henry Saint Clair Wilkins.

During the British colonial period, Gujarat was ruled by several princely states, the rulers of which designed elaborate palaces and public buildings. These were built in various Indo-European styles.

=== Gothic ===
Gothic buildings in Gujarat include the Prag Mahal designed by Henry Saint Clair Wilkins.

=== Indo-Saracenic ===
The Indo-Saracenic buildings in Gujarat includes the Vijaya Vilas Palace in Mandvi, Laxmi Vilas Palace and Nyay Mandir in Vadodara. The Maharaja Sayajirao University was designed by Robert Chisholm.

Rajmahal, a palace in Mehsana completed in 1904, is another example designed by the English architect Frederick William Stevens.

Pratap Vilas Palace and Willingdon Crescent (known Darbargarh Market now) in Jamnagar has influences of European architecture.

=== Haveli architecture ===
The haveli is an example of late 19th century civil architecture of the state. Vithalbhai Haveli is one such example.

== Post-Independence (1947 CE - present) ==
=== Modernist ===
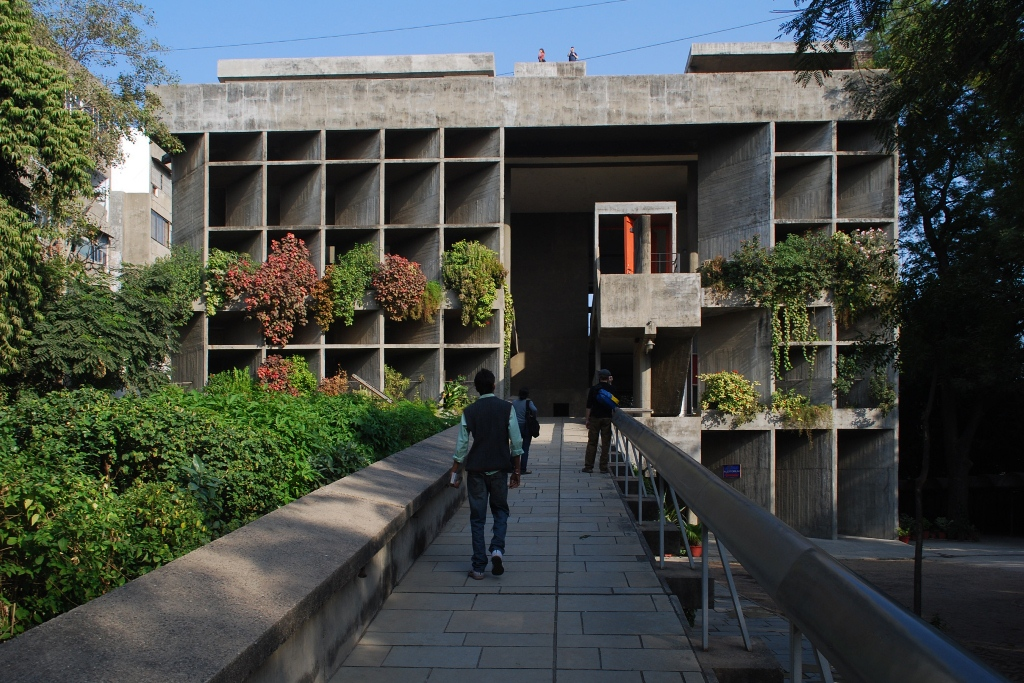
Mill Owners' Association Building, designed by Le Corbusier, and completed in 1954..

Le Corbusier, was invited to Ahmedabad in the 20th century by the mill owners to design their villas as well as some public buildings. The Sanskar Kendra, Villa Sarabhai, Villa Shodhan, and Mill Owners' Association Building in Ahmedabad were designed by Le Corbusier.

American architect Louis Kahn designed the IIM Ahmedabad.

The Premabhai Hall, Tagore Memorial Hall, and Institute of Indology in Ahmedabad were designed by B. V. Doshi, an architect who worked under both Corbusier and Louis Kahn.

== See also ==
- History of stepwells in Gujarat

== Sources ==
- Patel, Alka (2004). Building Communities in Gujarāt: Architecture and Society During the Twelfth Through Fourteenth Centuries. BRILL. pp. xi–xvi, 3–20. ISBN 90-04-13890-0.
