= Firangi Deval =

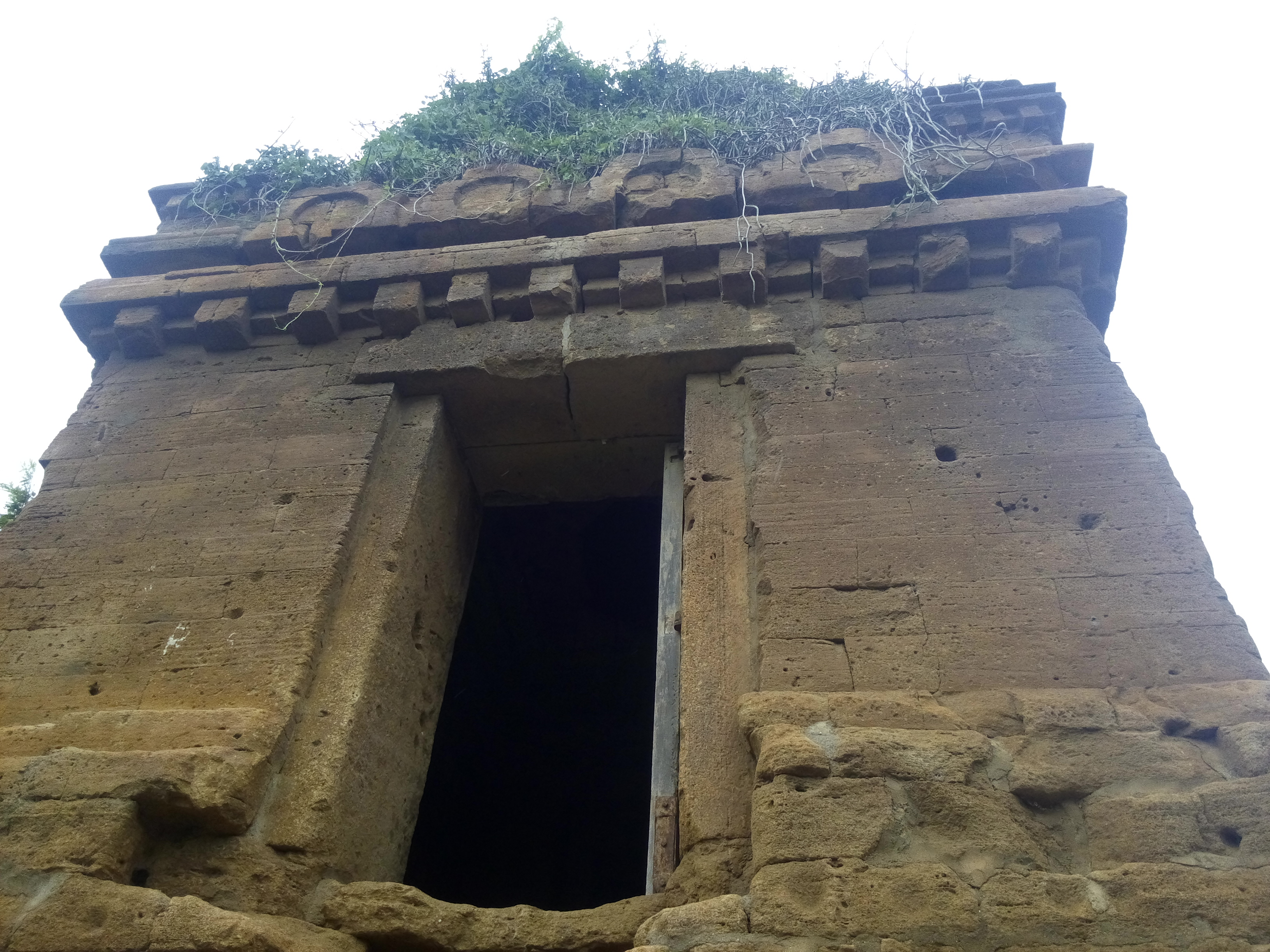

- Location within Gujarat Location within India
- Alternative names: Devalvasi, Maitraka Temple of Kalsar

General information
- Type: Temple
- Location: Kalsar village near Mahuva, Bhavnagar district, Gujarat, India
- Coordinates: 21.0717°N 71.5348°E

Design and construction
- Designations: ASI State Protected Monument (S-GJ-33)

Firangi Deval, also known as Devalvasi, is an old temple monument located in Kalsar village near Mahuva, Bhavnagar district, Gujarat, India.

== History ==
It is constructed in 7th century during the Maitraka rule. It is said locally that the temple was used to hoist flag to warn citizens to return to castle in case of raid. The temple is about two kilometres from the sea. The claim can not be historically verified.

It is state protected monument (S-GJ-33). It is now poorly maintained. Ravishankar Raval had first described the temple in 1947-48 as the Sun Temple.

The temple has a close affinity with the temples of Bileshwar, Visavada, and Sutrapada.

== Architecture ==
This east facing shrine proper is slight oblong in plan with small mandapa hall in front of it. The structure is built on plain upapitha, plinth. The walls are plain except the upper most area where there is Dantavali, a carved band of stylized rafter's end with minor kapota at the top. The superstructure above the temple is built by tritala, three courses with all three having Karnakuta carvings in order of 4, 3 and 2. The upper most crowning stone is missing which may have been Sala-shikhara. The mandapa too has superstructure vimana with one less course, which let into fronton of vimana over cella. The crowning stone has large Surpa with prominent Chandrasala in front of it. Karnakuta is used to decorate both superstructures but they are not decorated with Chaitya dormers here. No mortar is used to fix the stones.

The temple is not used for worship now and does not contain any murti. The temple was probably used as Buddhist or Brahminical shrine identified by Chaitya dormers on the courses of vimana.
