= Magderu =

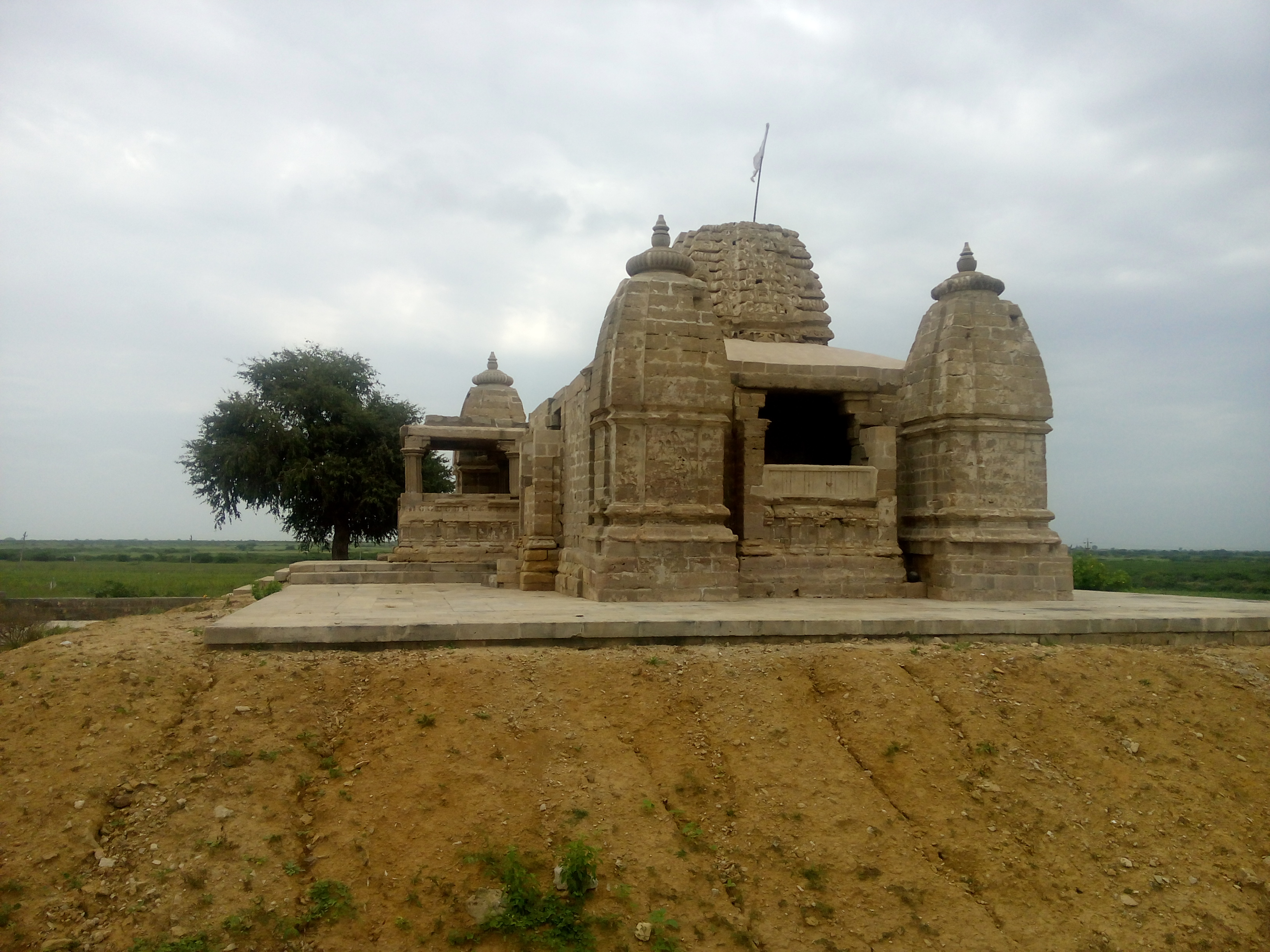
- The temple from east. Entrance in the north is visible.

- Location in Gujarat

Religion
- Affiliation: Hinduism
- Deity: Probably Surya or Shiva

Location
- Location: Dhrasanvel village near Dwarka, Devbhoomi Dwarka district, Gujarat
- Interactive map of Magderu
- Coordinates: 22.289094°N 69.051486°E

Architecture
- Type: Maitraka (Early Nagara)
- Completed: Middle of the 8th century
- Temple: 7

Magderu is an 8th-century temple of Maitraka period located near Dhrasanvel village in Okhamandal Taluka of Devbhoomi Dwarka district, Gujarat, India. The temple is located three miles northeast of Dwarka.

== Architecture ==
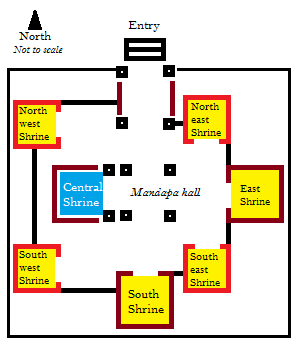
Plan of Magderu

The temple belongs to early Nagara style temples with single spire with lattice work (sajala) in it. The rectangular, north-facing temple is saptayatana (seven shrine) type with one central large shrine surrounded by six smaller shrines. It is on low platform (jagati). This temple with multiple shrines may be modification of either panchayatana (five shrine) type with addition of shrines in east and south of the central shrine or ashtayatana (eight shrine) type with replacement of eighth shrine with the flight of the steps to access the temple from north. The jagati is buttressed on north and south. The enclosing wall which once connects the shrines.

The central shrine has pancharatha (five-fold) plan. It is the earliest known five-fold planned temple in the region. It has old style vedibandha (the lowest socle or foundation block) and almost plain mandovara (middle of the outer wall of shrine). The shikhara (spire) and sukhasana (assembly seats) are also in ruins. The mandapa (roof above the assembly hall) is now restored with its Bhadraka style pillars with their lintels are still surviving.

The temple once housed Saptamatrikas. The pithika of it is still there. The doorway is plain and without any ornamentation. The eastern shrine was probably for Nandi.

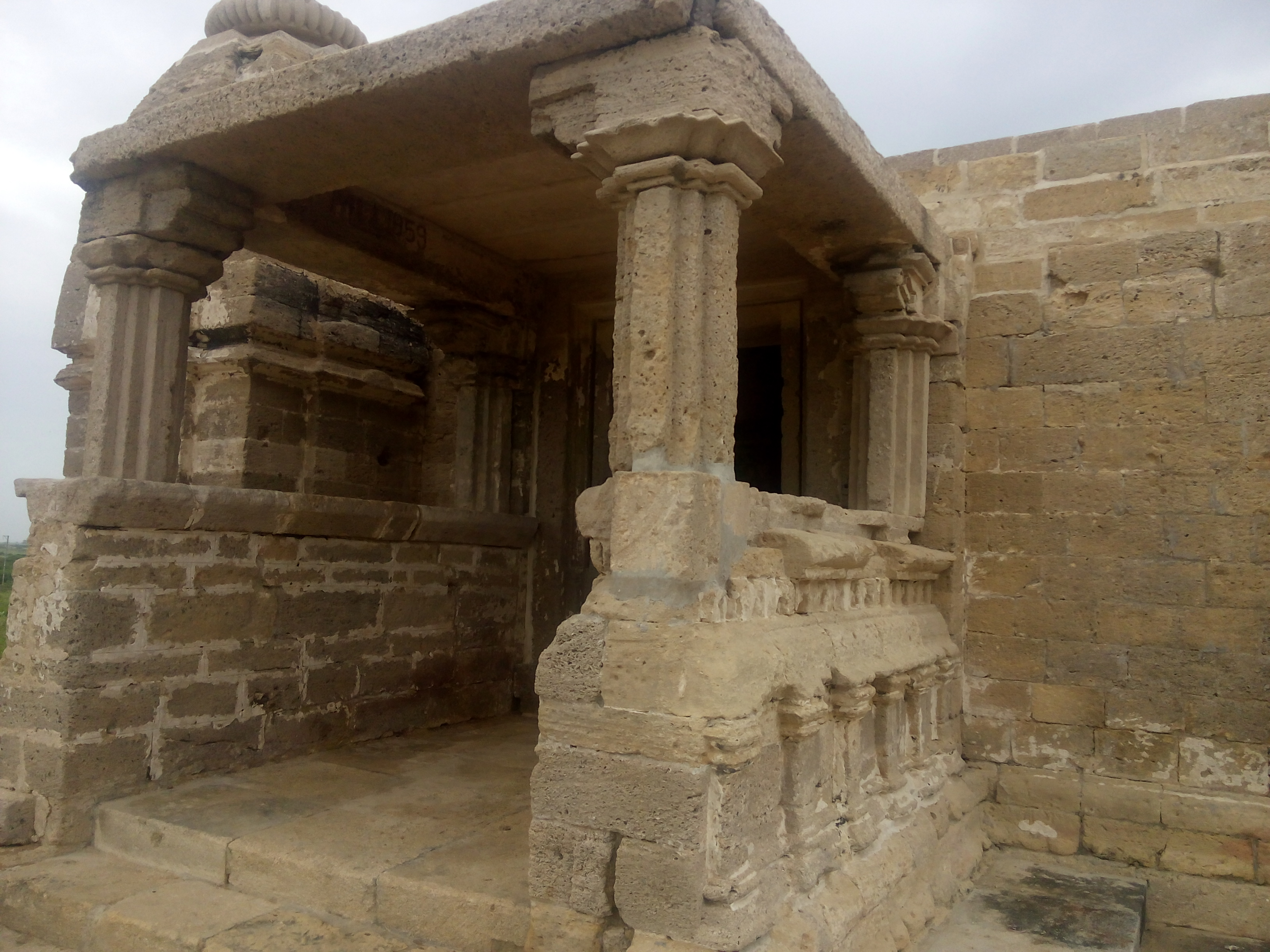
Northern entrance

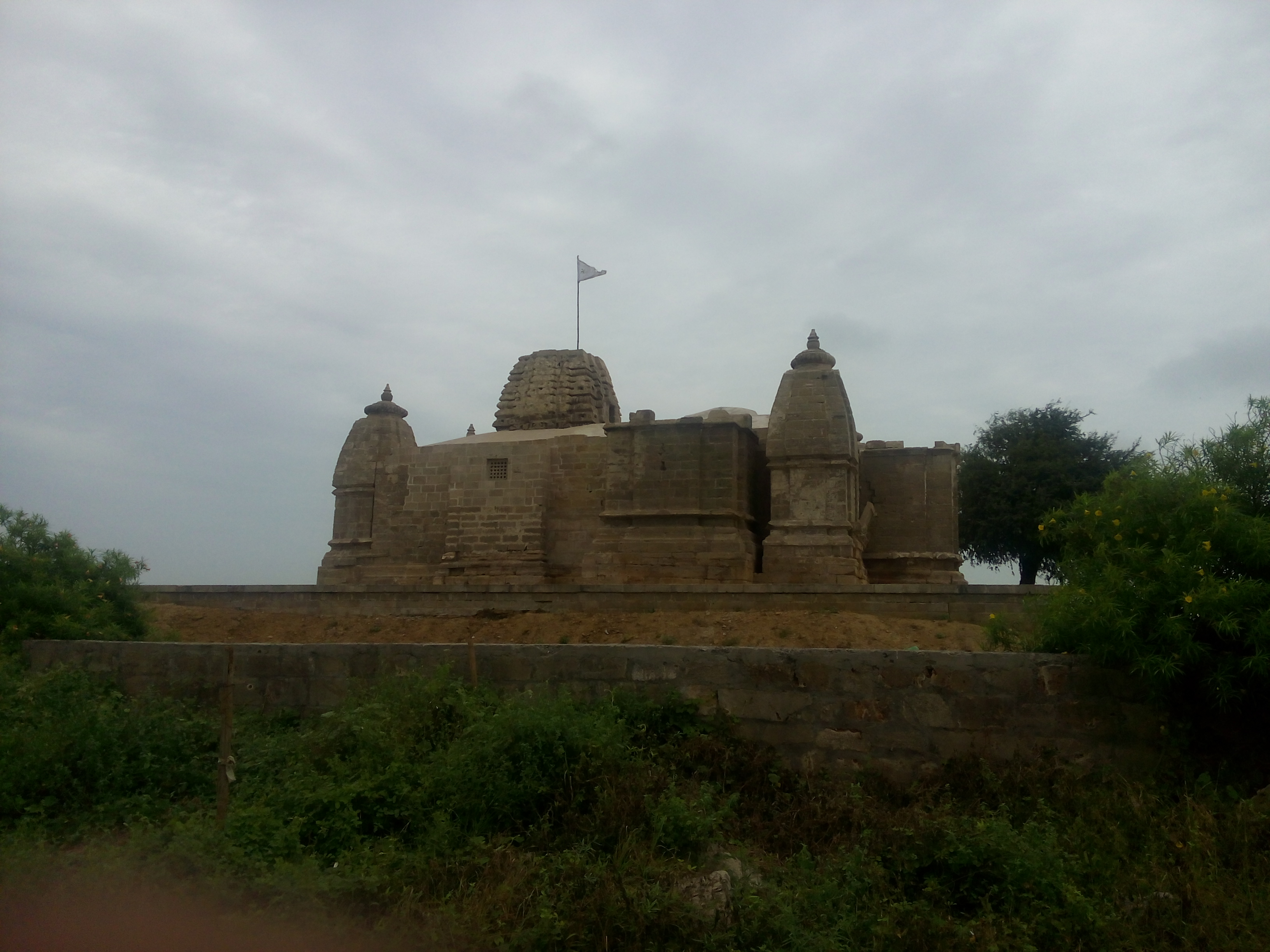
Temple from distance. The ruined spire is seen.

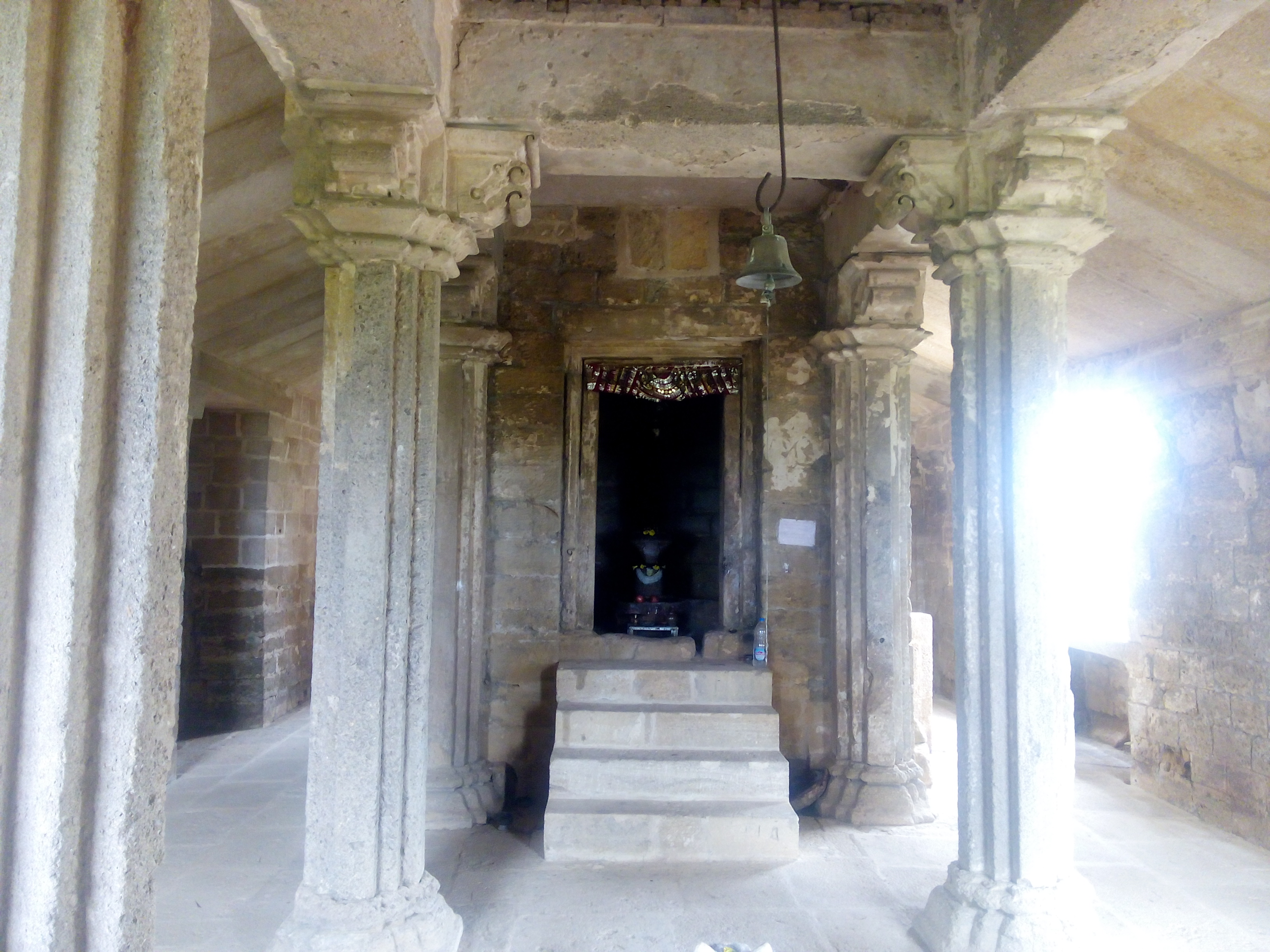
Inside. Bhadraka stype pillars and plain doorway is visible.

== History ==
M. A. Dhaky and J. M. Nanavati opines that "Maga" in the name of the temple suggests that it may be connected to Aboti Maga Brahmins who were worshippers of Surya (solar deity) and immigrants from Iran to western India. So the temple may have been the Sun temple. It may have been the Shiva temple as well. The temple is currently belongs to Shiva.

The spire of the temple has more elaborate lattice work than the Sutrapada temple and less elaborate work than the Roda temples. As Roda temples are placed in the last quarter of the eighth century, so this temple is placed in the middle of the eighth century by Dhaky and Nanavati. So the temple was constructed during the Maitraka period.

The site is inscribed as the Monument of National Importance (N-GJ-129) and is maintained by Vadodara Circle of Archeological Survey of India.
