= Rani Rupamati's Mosque =

Mosque in Ahmedabad, Gujarat, India

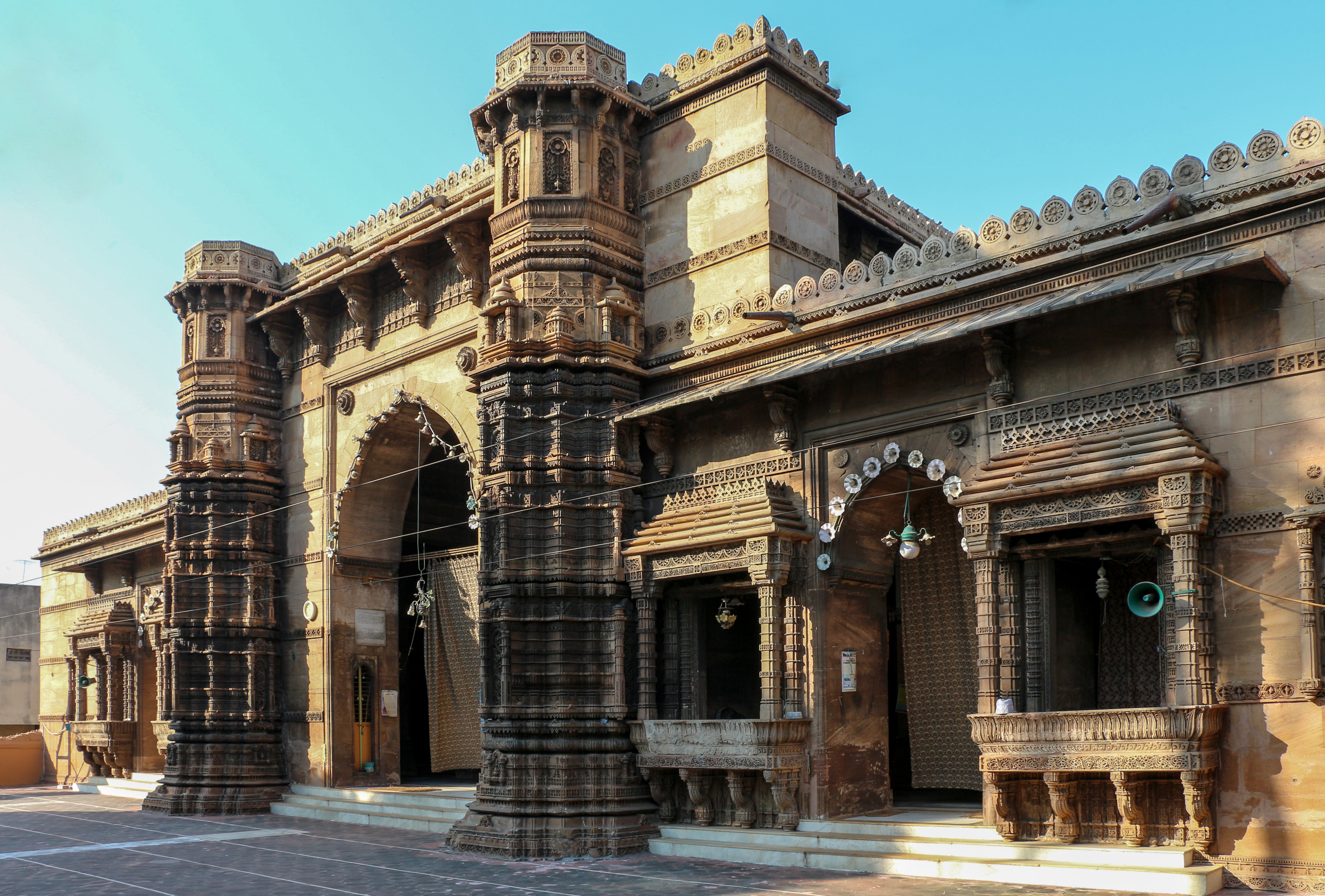

- Location in Ahmedabad

Religion
- Affiliation: Sunni Islam
- Sect: Sufism
- Ecclesiastical or organisational status: Dargah and mosque
- Status: Active

Location
- Location: Mirzapur, Ahmedabad, Gujarat
- Country: India
- Coordinates: 23°01′55″N 72°35′02″E

Architecture
- Type: Mosque architecture
- Style: Gujarati, Indo-Islamic
- Funded by: Mahmud Begada
- Completed: c. 1430–c. 1440

Specifications
- Length: 32 m (105 ft)
- Width: 14 m (46 ft)
- Height (max): 9.8 m (32 ft)
- Dome: 13
- Minaret: Two (partially destroyed)

Monument of National Importance
- Official name: Rani Rupamati's Mosque
- Reference no.: N-GJ-27

Rani Rupamati's Mosque, also known as Rani Rupavati's Mosque or Mirzapur Queen's Mosque, is a Sufi mosque and dargah complex in the Mirzapur area of Ahmedabad, in the state of Gujarat, India. The structure is a Monument of National Importance.

== History ==
The mosque was built by Mahmud Begada, probably in the latter years (1430-1440) of Ahmad Shah I's reign. It is named after Rani Rupamati whom Mahmud Begada married after the death of Qutubuddin.

== Architecture ==
The mosque measures 32 metres (105 ft) long, 14 metres (46 ft) wide, and 9.8 metres (32 ft) high. The mosque features a high central arch, three imposing domes, slim minarets, carved galleries, and an exquisite mihrab. Its three domes are linked together by a flat roof. The side entrances of the mosque open into balcony windows on either side and end in a lattice window. The domes are supported with rows of twelve pillars each whereas the smaller domes at the front and the rear of the bigger domes as well as the four corners of the mosque are there. The central section is an elevated level that rises above the small flanks and provides for a pierced clerestory, which carries the dome above. Though broken short in the 1819 Rann of Kutch earthquake, the bases of their minarets, from the fine tracery in their niches, remain among the mosque’s most notable architectural features.

Close by the mosque is a monument, with a large central and two side domes, raised over the tombs of Rani Rupamati and the other queen. The interior of the dome is richly ornamented.

Rani Rupamati mosque is a fine example, among many in Ahmedabad, of Gujarati-style Indo-Islamic architecture.

== Gallery ==
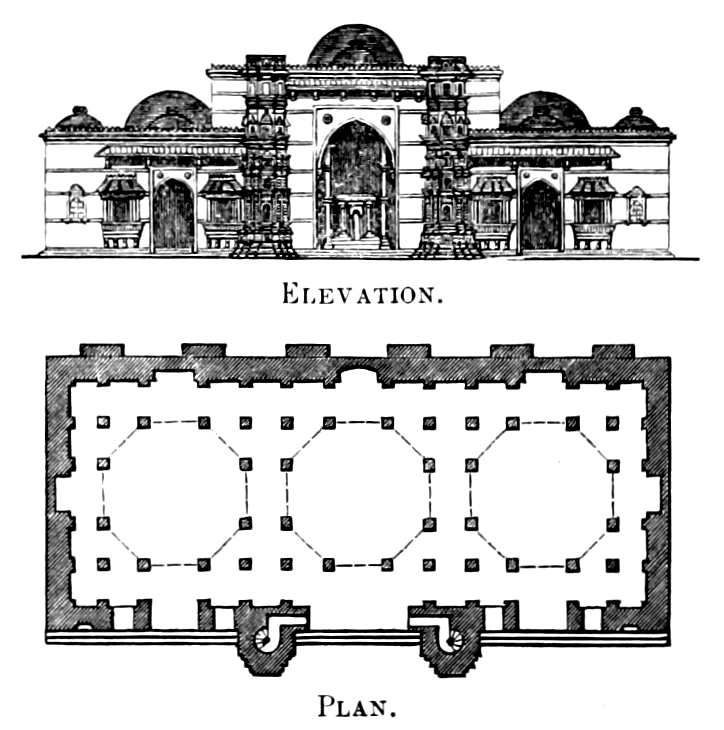
Plan and elevation of mosqueh

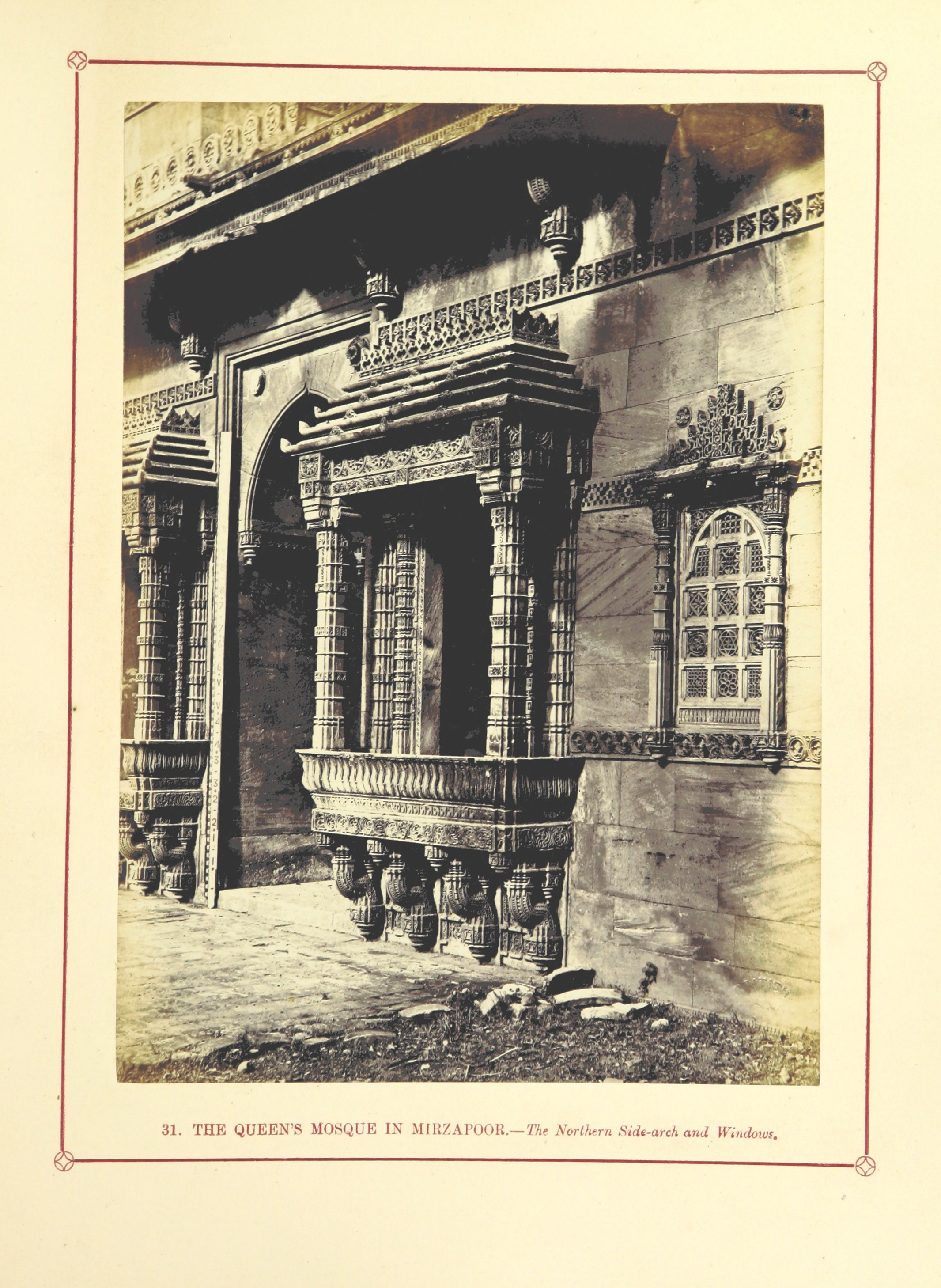
Northern side-arch and window of mosque

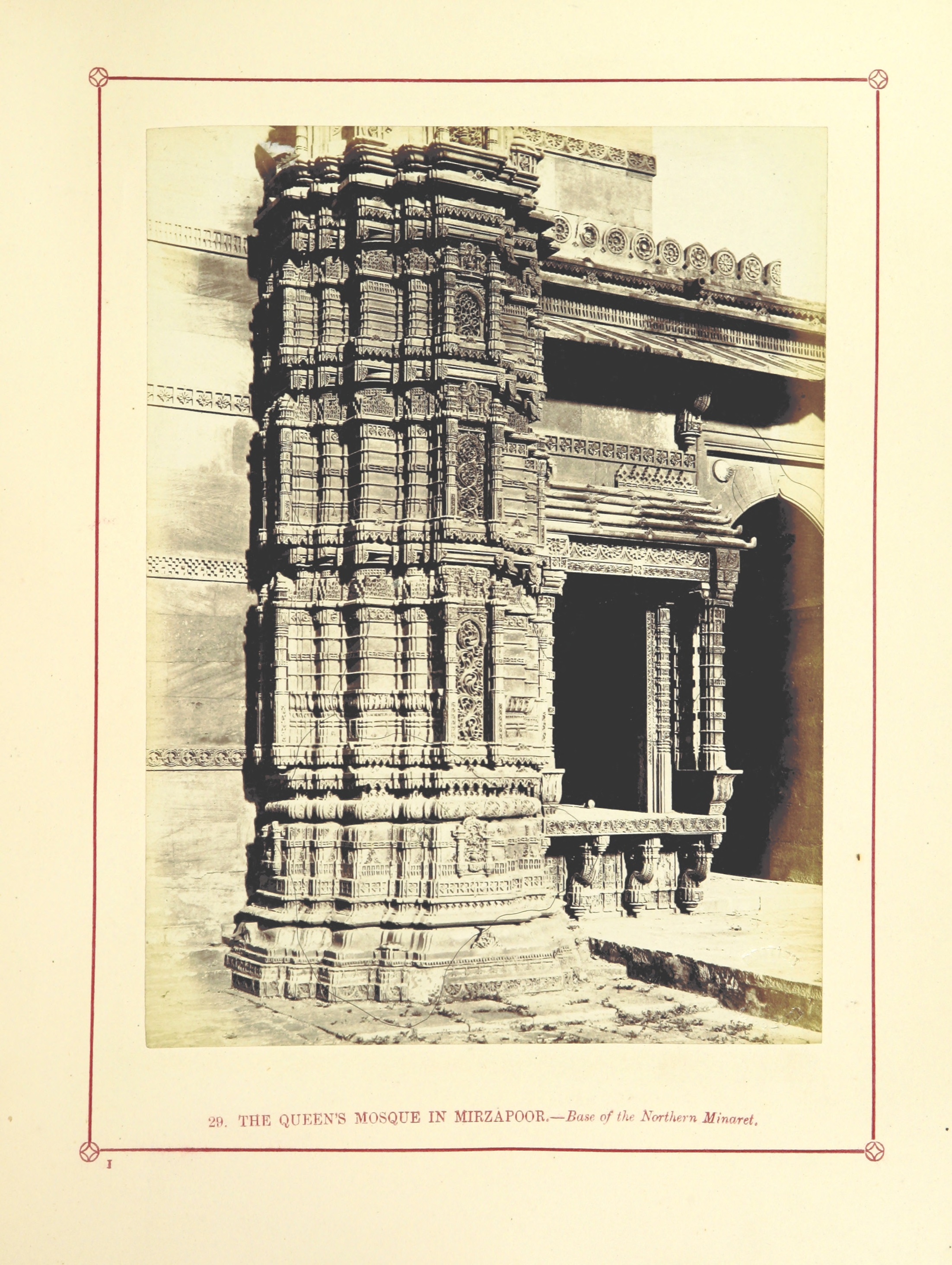
Base of the northern minaret

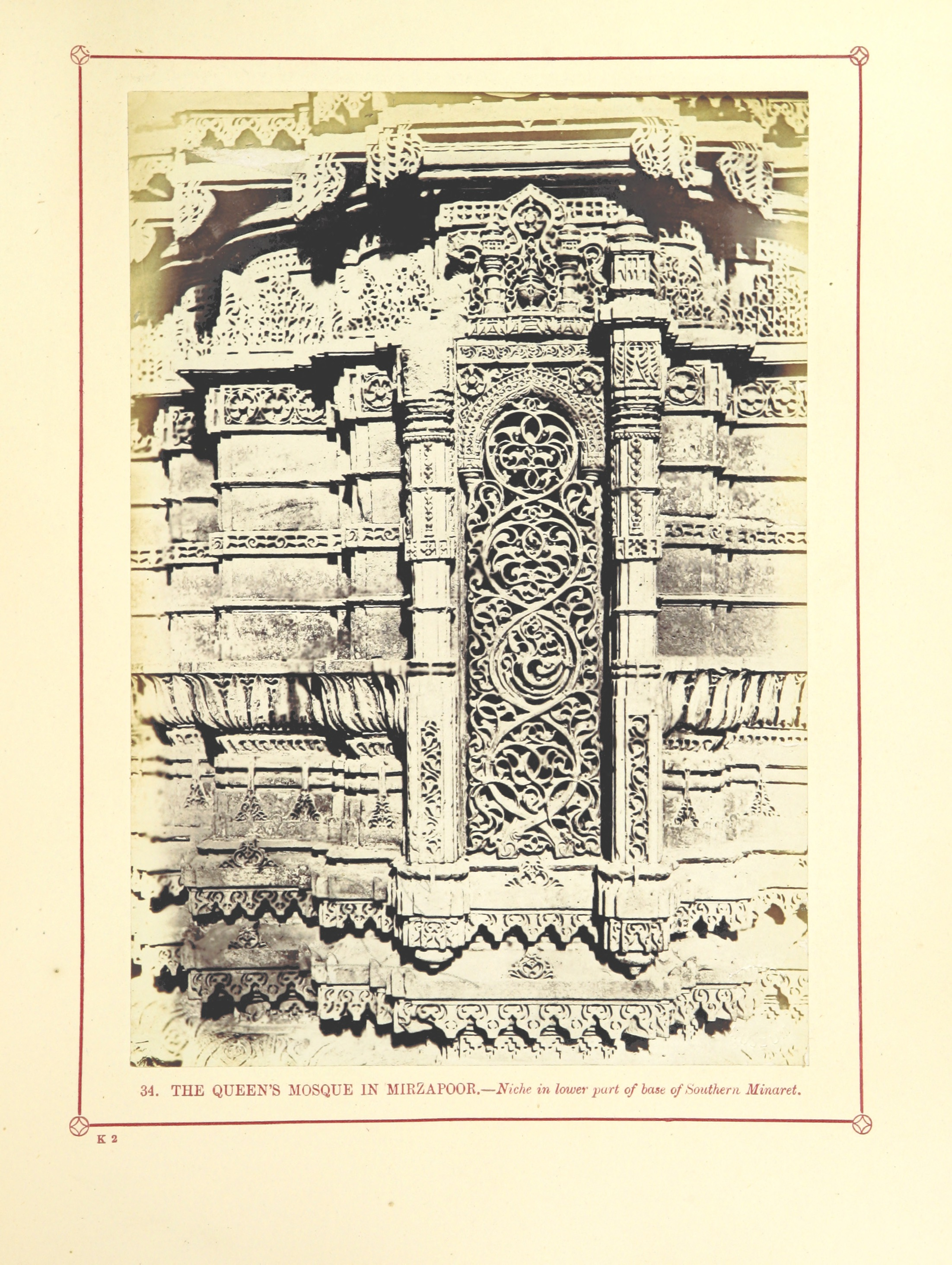
Niche in lower part of base of northern minaret

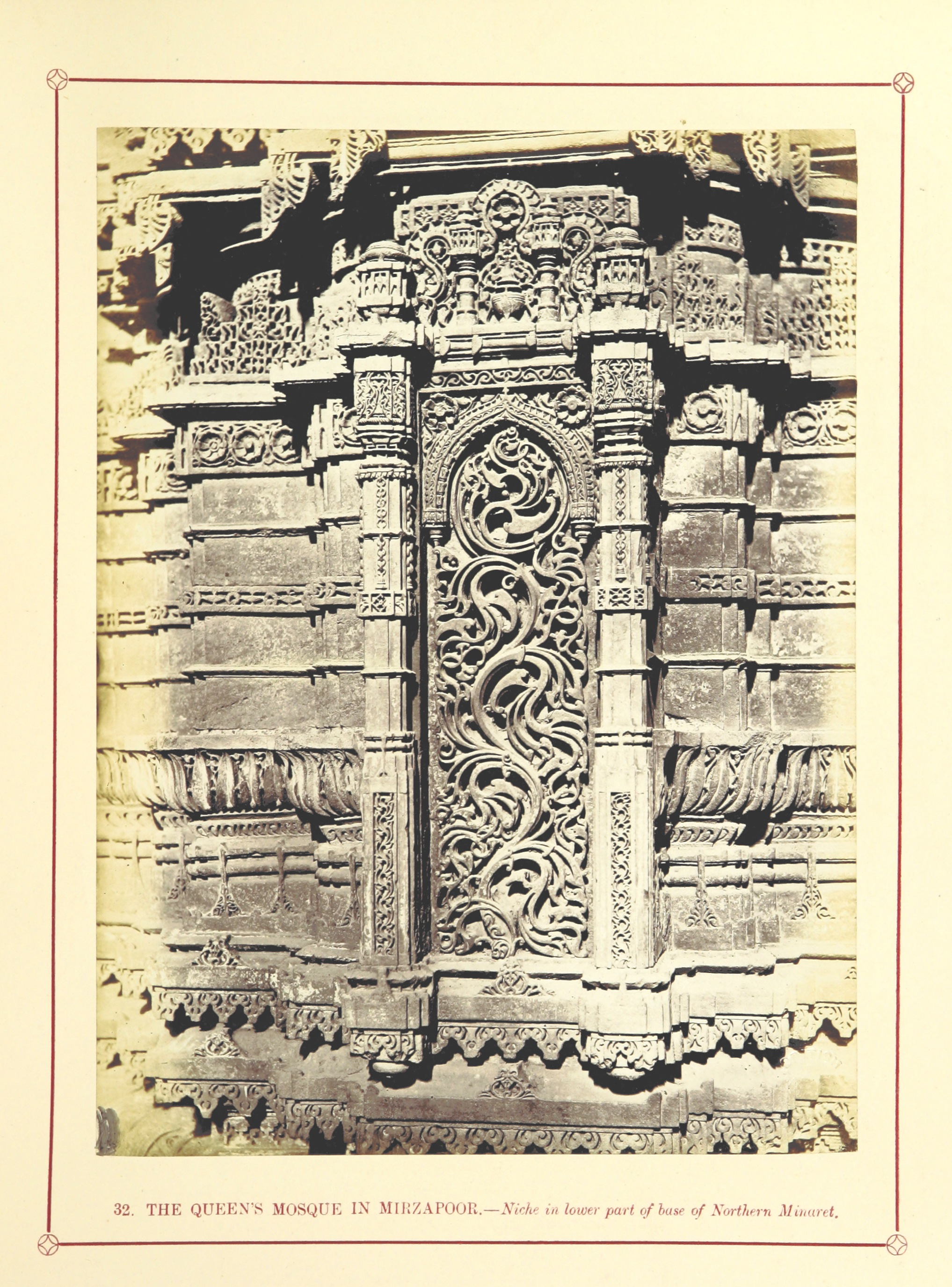
Niche in lower part of base of northern minaret

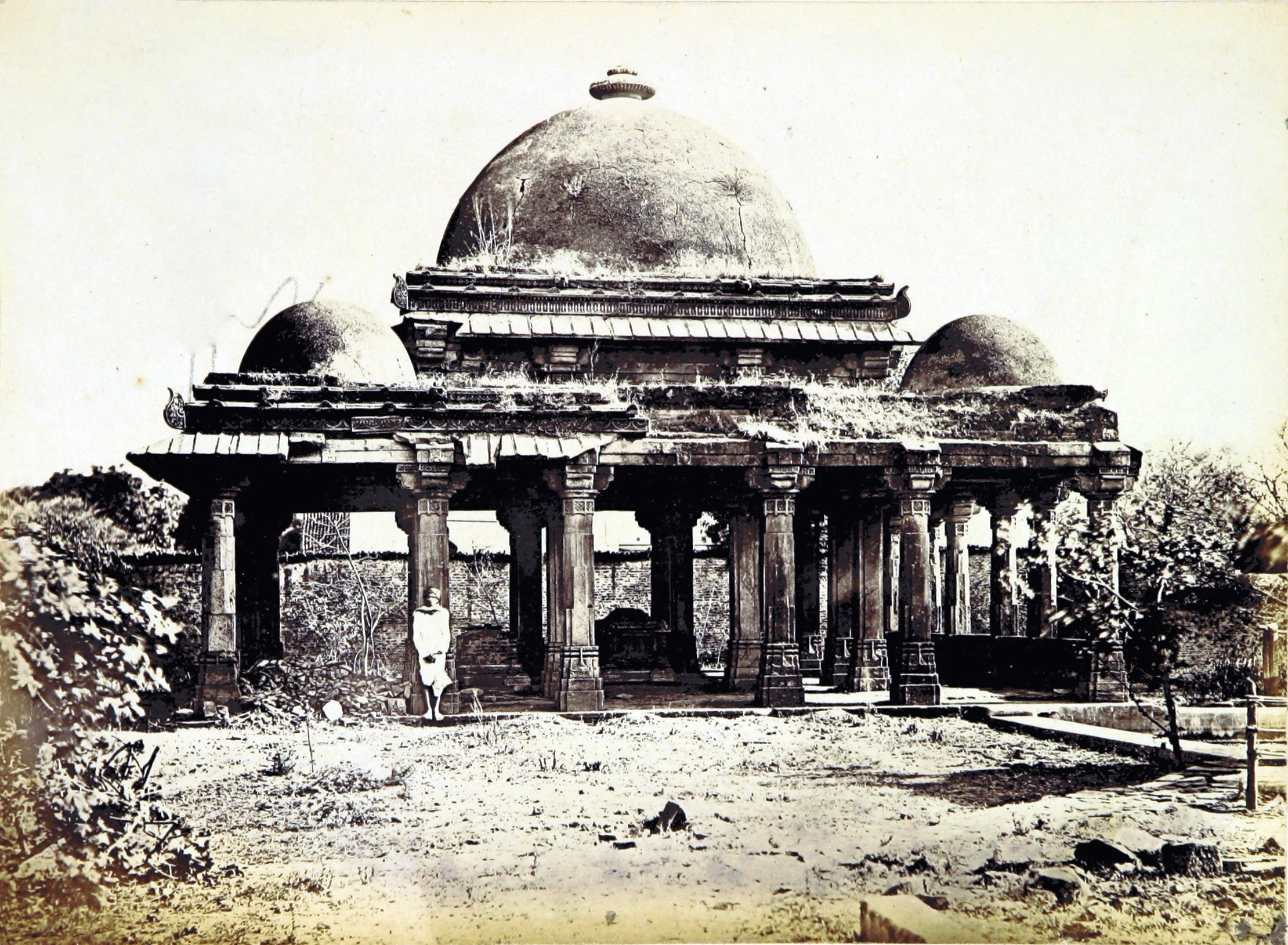
The adjacent tomb

== See also ==
- Islam in India
- List of mosques in India
- List of Monuments of National Importance in Gujarat
