= Ashiyapat =

Village in Gujarat state, India

Ashiyapat is a village in Ranavav Taluka of Porbandar district, Gujarat, India. It is about twenty miles north east of Porbandar.

The village is situated close to Bileshwar on the northern bank of the Bileshvari river. Ashiyapat is about a mile and a half to the east of the Barda range of hills, the highest summit of which, Mount Venu, is 2057 feet above the level of the sea. The village was under Porbandar State during British period.

== Notable people ==
- Muljibhai Madhvani, Indian born Ugandan industrialist.

== Demographics ==
According to the 2011 Census of India, the population of Ashiyapat totalled 428 in 2011, divided over 96 households living on 1,114 hectares of land.
