= Kalika Mata Temple, New Dhrewad =

Kalika Mata Temple, Old Dhrewad
- Location within Gujarat Location within India

General information
- Type: Temple
- Location: New Dhrewad village, Devbhoomi Dwarka district, Gujarat, India
- Coordinates: 22.149327°N 69.072777°E

Design and construction
- Designations: ASI State Protected Monument (N-GJ-122)

The Kalika Mata Temple is located at New Dhrewad in Devbhoomi Dwarka district, Gujarat, India.

== Location and history ==
The temple belongs to Maitraka period (7th century). The temple is one of the two ancient temples located near the village, other being Rajal Vejal Mata temple. The temple is inscribed as the Monument of National Importance (N-GJ-122) by the Archaeological Survey of India (ASI).

== Architecture ==
M. A. Dhaky and Nanavati has classified this temple of Vimanakara type due to its shikhara (spire) with neo-Dravidic subtype.

The east-facing temple is a sandhara (sanctuary with an interior ambulatory) type temple with its adhisthana (base) visible at the few places. The sequence of carvings is as follow: large padma (inverted cyma recta), kusuma, vajana ("plank-edge" moulding), kandhara (necking), uttara (beam), urdhvapadma (upper cyma moulding), kapota (roll cornice) and pattika (plain band). Padma is not yet evolved into Kumbha (pot) visible in future Nagara class temples and kumuda are very large and not yet evolved in kalasha (urn).

The square cella has plain walls crowned with an urdhvapadma with dog tongue carvings and a kapota. The shikhara superstructure has five tiers, each having chandrashala carvings in decreasing numbers from five to one. The last tier is flanked by half dormers. It is crowned by an amlasaraka ("corrugated wheel" just below the finial) and a kalasha which may be added later. There is no deity inside the cella. There are some idols placed inside now.

The mandapa hall is closed from sides with plain walls. There is a window at the centre with a dandachadya (corrugated hood) and surasenaka (trefoil chaitya dormer) above it. A band of "rafter’s ends" and a kapota runs on the top area of the walls. There are four bhadraka (square pillar with recesses) type pillars in the centre. The mukhamandapa (entry porch) seems later addition.
