= Villa Shodhan =

House by Le Corbusier in Ahmedabad, India

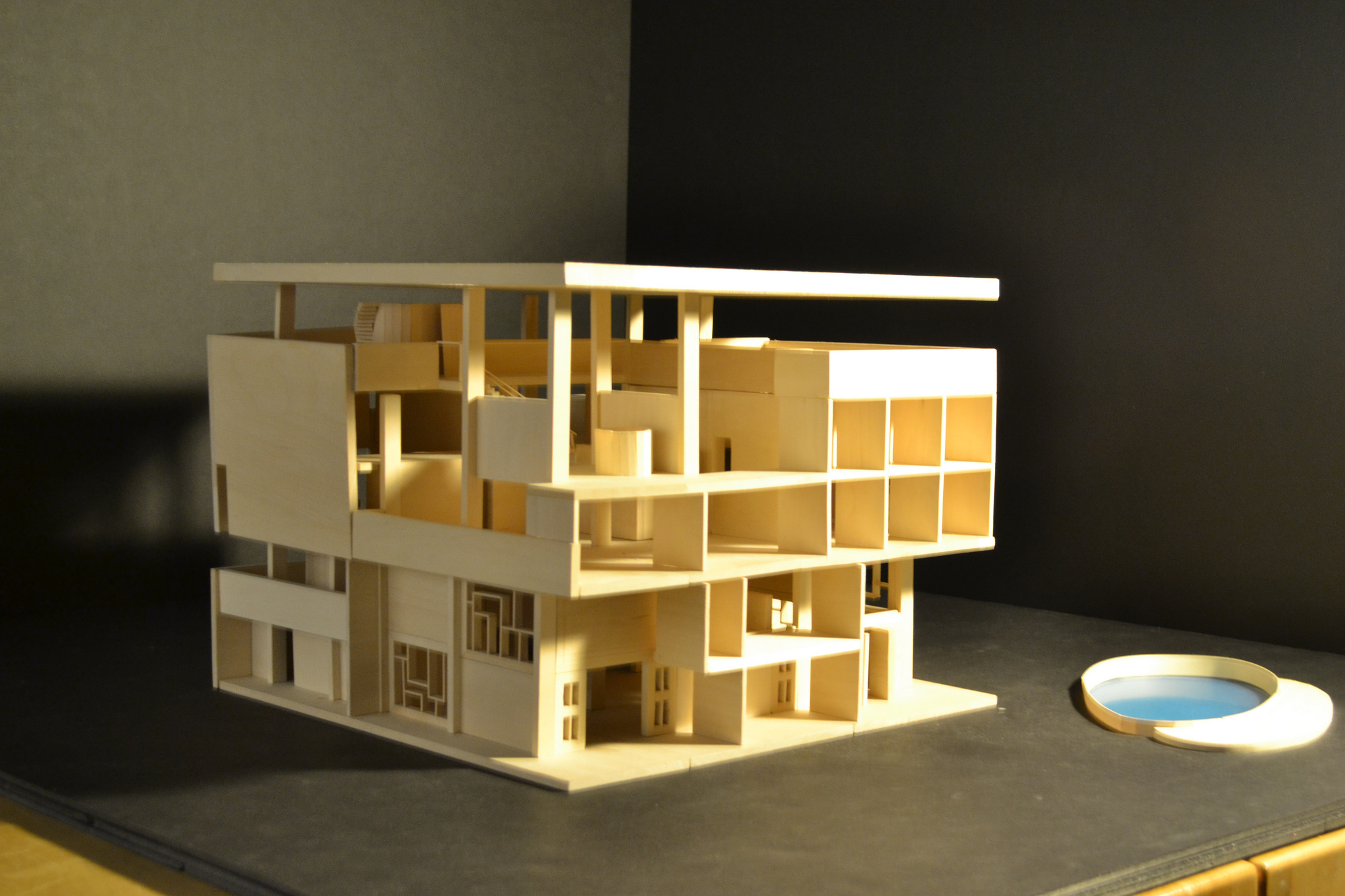
- Model of the Villa Shodhan

- Location within Ahmedabad
- Alternative names: Shodhan House

General information
- Type: Villa
- Location: Near Gandhigram railway station, Ellisbridge, Ahmedabad, India
- Coordinates: 23°01′31″N 72°34′03″E
- Construction started: 1951
- Completed: 1956
- Client: Surottam Hutheesing (original); Shyamu Shodhan (later)
- Owner: Shodhan family

Design and construction
- Architect: Le Corbusier

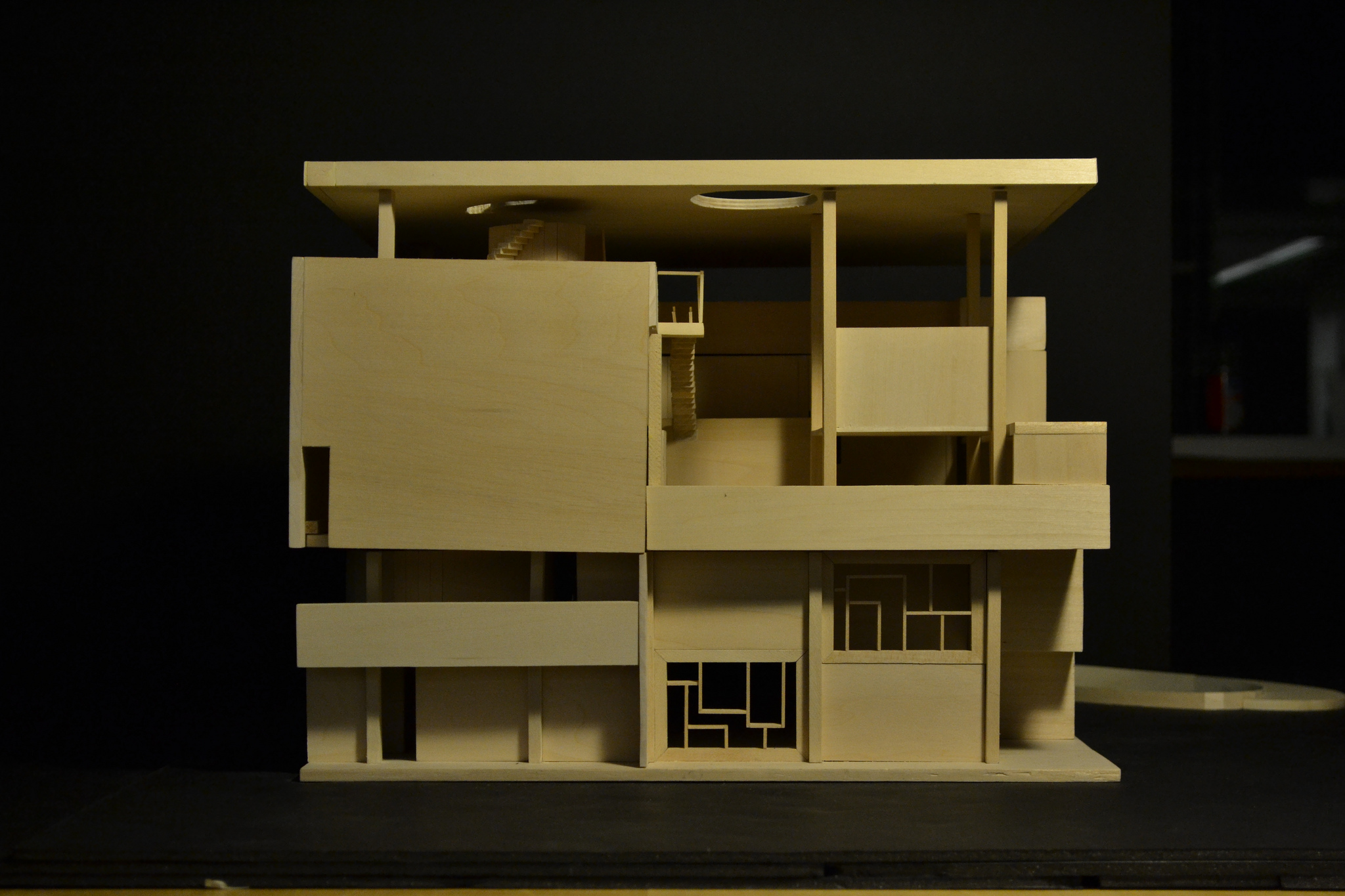
Model of the villa

Villa Shodhan (or Shodhan House) is a modernist villa located in Ahmedabad, India. Designed by the Swiss-French architect Le Corbusier, it was built between 1951 and 1956. Building on his previous projects whilst integrating the traditional features of Ahmedabad design, the villa symbolizes Le Corbusier's domestic architecture. The building is currently used as a private residence.

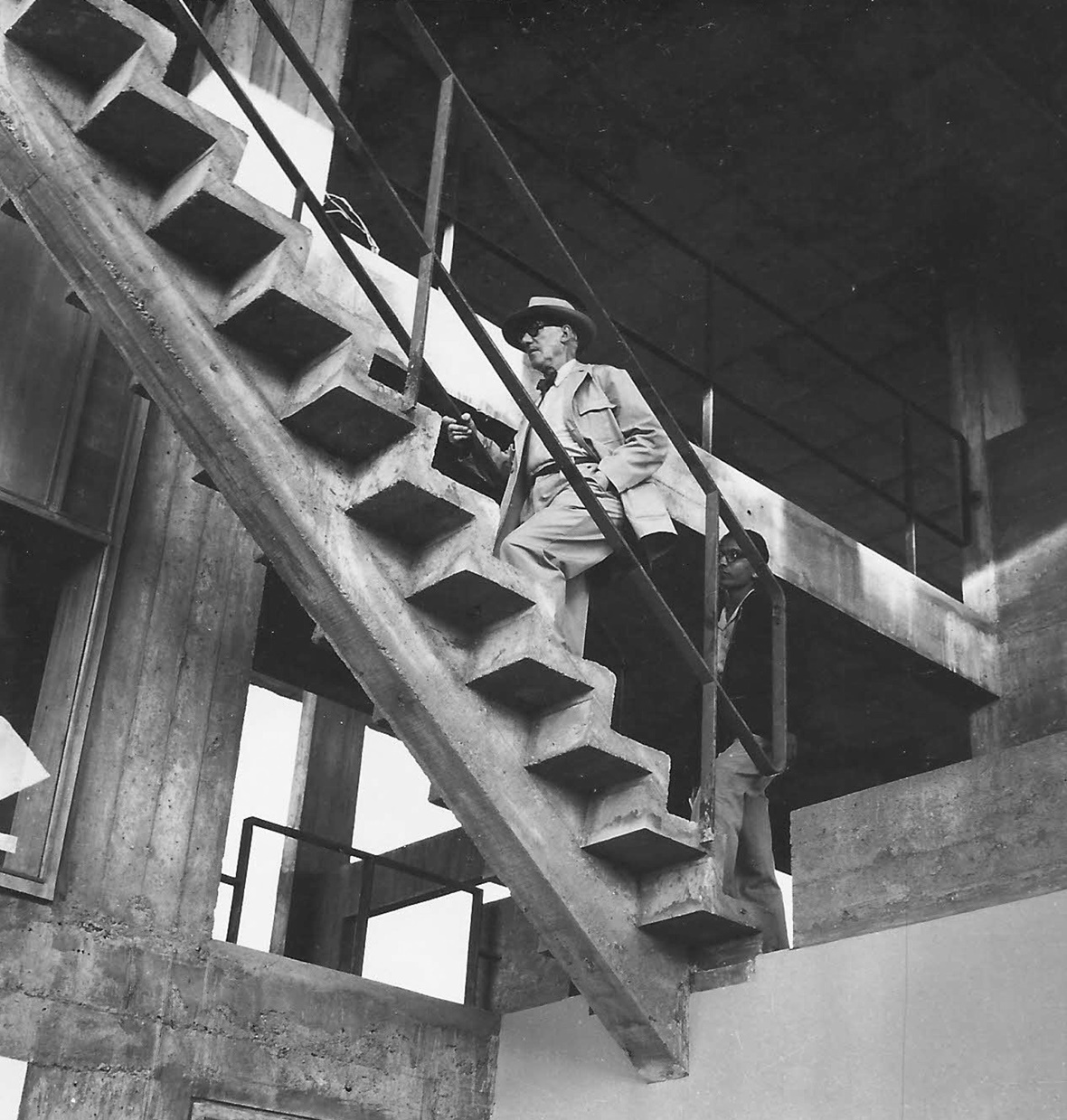
Le Corbusier and Balkrishna Doshi in the house in 1955

== History ==
The original design of Villa Shodhan was commissioned to the secretary of the Millowners, Surottam Hutheesing, in 1951. His intention was to showcase his social and economic position prior to his impending marriage by building a house reflecting his lifestyle. However, the plans were then sold to fellow millowner, Shyamubhai Shodhan. Despite his different lifestyle and an entirely new site for the project, Shodhan elected to retain the original plans as was the case for all of Le Corbusier's Indian projects.

== Design ==
Key aspects considered in designing Villa Shodhan included sun, wind, the view upon arrival and landscaping. They could be addressed above all by the positioning of the facades which, with a diagonal orientation, allowed the incoming visitor a view over three-quarters of the building. The landscaping sets off the building by contrasting the curved mounds of the site with the geometric, rectangular lines of the structure. The rectangles on the north-west and south-west façades are further emphasized through the installation of brise soleil for protection from glare.

The design of the Villa Shodhan is structurally simplistic while still retaining plasticity in the treatment of the divided spaces. The overall frame of the building is in raw concrete, with clear markings of the wooden formwork. The frame is anchored to the ground, not elevated on stilts, a feature Le Corbusier used frequently in the 1920s. Standard sheet metal is added to the underside of the interior ceilings and a protective parasol is used as the roof. The design of the interior concrete piers, running to the full height of the building's elevation, is based around the architect's domino skeleton design established in 1915. A ramp provides access to the main and mezzanine levels, while the rooms are grouped around a triple-height terrace. The ramp also leads to accompanying stairs, providing access to the roof and terrace. The terrace plays an important role in the natural climate control process, cooling down the bedrooms in the middle of the day and providing an alternate sleeping area during the summertime. Upon the parasol roof of Villa Shodhan, there is a garden abundant in thick grass and water troughs. The vision of dense greenery is also reinforced by overrun plants and trees, seeming to camouflage the building and its environment. The roof also features an oval aperture, which matches up with a hole in the lower slab roof, giving visitors a framed view of the sky. This is almost mimicked by the pool, situated at the base of the ramp, aiming to bring the outside in.

== Influences, inspiration and previous projects ==
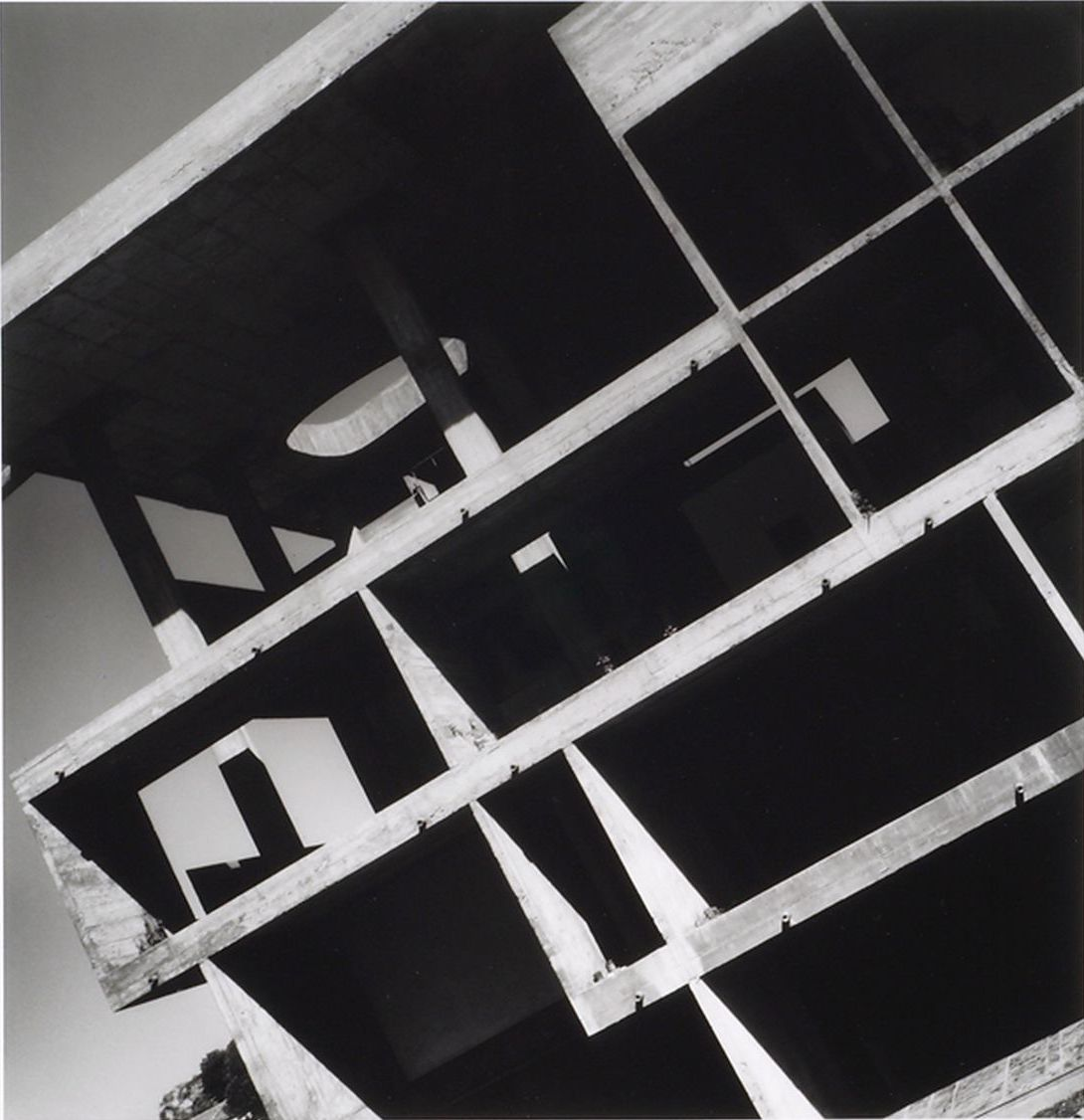
Photograph by Lucien Hervé of the southwestern façade of the building

Post 1945 can be seen as a period of reflection and reassessment for Le Corbusier. This is clearly evident through the drastic changes to his style, evident at Villa Shodhan. Three areas highlight this change:

- Incorporation of nature into design: This is seen through considerations of light, wind, rain and the addition of plants into the building
- Influences from the De Stijl movement: The parasol roof and the connectivity between the interior spaces clearly reflect De Stijl influences. It can also be seen through the façade windows and the brise-soleil, where asymmetry, flexibility and plasticity were key elements incorporated into the design. These elements are also present through classic symbols of the De Stijl movement such as Mondrian's paintings or Reitveld's Schroder house. However, these De Stijl design choices are controlled well within the building by the classical cube.
- The reviving of his previous style developed in the 1920s: The Villa Shodhan reflects many of Le Corbusier's previous designs, all built in the 1920s. The most prominent examples of this are his Villa Savoye and Maison Citrohan projects. These projects also reference De Stijl values. The comparison between his Villa Savoye and Villa Shodhan rests within the plasticity of the design and the freedom that this brings. The overall concrete form and the use of strip windows at Villa Savoye is the origin of this plasticity. Comparisons can be made between Le Corbusier's Maison Citrohan and Villa Shodhan particularly focusing on the male nature of this architecture. The angular, strong, geometric form of Maison Citrohan clearly reflects the masculine aspects present in architecture, and confers this onto the Villa Shodhan. The interconnected nature of the ventilation and shade systems also highlights the similarities.

For this building to be incorporated into the culture and style of Ahmedabad, Le Corbusier incorporated features of old Ahmedabad houses, including the ancestral Shodhan residence. The most prominent reflection of this is the double height living room on the ground level. Traditionally, the entrance halls of old Ahmedabad houses were double-height, reflecting opulence and status. This readaptation, along with the open plan of the building allowed Villa Shodhan to be integrated into the Indian environment. This is a very different to his parallel running project, Villa Sarabhai.

== Critical reception ==
Villa Shodhan was considered to be built in Le Corbusier's period of fulfilment with comparisons made between many of his previous projects. Villa Shodhan is considered to be an updated and more profound version of his Villa Savoye and Villa at Carthage. The plan of Villa Shodhan recalls the ingenuity of the Villa Savoye, placed in a tropical setting. It has also been stated that Villa Shodhan is the finest reinterpretation of the idea behind Maison Citrohan.

== See also ==
- Villa Sarabhai
- Manik Bagh
