= Villa Sarabhai =

House by Le Corbusier in Ahmedabad, India

General information
- Location: India, Ahmedabad, Gujarat
- Coordinates: 23.053929°N 72.593609°E
- Completed: 1955
- Owner: Sarabhai

Design and construction
- Architect: Le Corbusier

Villa Sarabhai, or Villa de Madame Manorama Sarabhai, is a modernist villa located in Ahmedabad, India. Designed by the French-Swiss architect Le Corbusier, it was built between 1951 and 1955. It was built with an austere interior, a typical Le Corbusier design principle.

== History ==
The villa was built for Manorama Sarabhai, the sister of Chinubhai Chimanlal. She commissioned it in 1951 to build a home for her growing family, and it was completed in 1955. Villa Sarabhai belongs to a group of three Le Corbusier works in Ahmedabad from the early 1950s, with Villa Shodhan and the Mill Owners' Association Building. In these works he developed a modern architecture rooted in its place.

== Design ==
The villa is located on a verdant 20-acre park owned by Sarabhais. Corbusier decided on the vault as the villa's defining structure after taking into consideration the local climate, which is characterized by wide fluctuations of temperature and humidity.

The house has an open plan made of a series of tiled barrel vaults that look onto a verdant garden. The only protection from the elements is bamboo blinds. The vaults are cradle vaults of flat tiles set in plaster without formwork, resting on rows of exposed bricks cast roughly in cement. The structure is built of load-bearing brick and stone walls carrying shallow Catalan vaults. In plan it resembles a comb of long parallel bays that reach into the garden, and the ends of the bays open onto deep shaded verandahs. Above the vaults, Le Corbusier piled earth and planted it, so the roof became a continuous garden.

== See also ==
- Villa Shodhan
