= Aboti Brahmin =

Saurastra's pujari of dwarkadhish temple in devbhumi dwarka gujarat

The Aboti Brahmin are a Sakaldwipiya Brahmin community living in the western part of India. They are mainly an agricultural community who were recorded living in Rajasthan, India, around 1228 CE (1306 VS), where they were usually temple servants and had migrated from Dvaravati. Today, they are found in the state of Gujarat. They perform puja at the Dwarkadhish Temple in the town of Dwarka in Gujarat during the Hindu festival of Janmashtami.

In addition to their priestly role at Dwarka, they are a farming community.

== See also ==
- Rajpurohit
- Jangid
