= Nandeshwara =

Nandeswar Balkrishna Nagari
- Village
- Location in Maharashtra, India
- Coordinates: 17.51667°N 75.46667°E
- Country: India
- State: Maharashtra
- District: Solapur

Population (2001)
  - Total: 9,653

Language
  - Official: Marathi
- Time zone: UTC+5:30 (IST)
- 413322: 413322
- Vehicle registration: MH-13

Nandeshwar is a village located in the Mangalwedha taluka of Solapur district in the Indian state of Maharashtra. It is situated approximately 15 kilometers from the taluka headquarters, Mangalwedha, and is known for its agricultural activities, cultural heritage, and religious traditions.

== Geography ==
Nandeshwar lies in the semi-arid region of southern Maharashtra, part of the Deccan Plateau. The village is surrounded by farmland and small water bodies, and the climate is generally hot and dry, with moderate rainfall during the monsoon season.

== Economy ==
Agriculture is the mainstay of Nandeshwar’s economy. The primary crops cultivated include jowar (sorghum), bajra (pearl millet), sugarcane, and pulses. Animal husbandry also plays a supportive role in the local economy. Due to its proximity to Mangalwedha, the village has access to regional markets and trading facilities.

== Culture and Religion ==
Nandeshwar is rich in cultural and religious traditions. The most prominent festival celebrated in the village is the Balkrishna Maharaj Palki. Held annually, this event is considered the biggest and most significant celebration in the village. Devotees from Nandeshwar and neighboring villages gather to participate in the procession of Balkrishna Maharaj's Palki (palanquin). The festival includes traditional bhajans, kirtans, communal meals, and a vibrant procession marked by spiritual fervor and community participation.

Other festivals like Ganesh Chaturthi, Diwali, Holi, and local yatra celebrations are also observed with enthusiasm.

== Education and Infrastructure ==
The village has a Zilla Parishad (ZP) school that provides primary education. For secondary education and higher facilities such as hospitals or colleges, residents typically travel to Mangalwedha or Solapur. Nandeshwar is connected to nearby towns via rural roads, and transport is available through state buses and private vehicles.

== Demographics ==
As per local estimates, Nandeshwar has a population of a few thousand residents. Marathi is the primary language spoken by the villagers. The community is predominantly agrarian, with strong social and cultural cohesion.

== Administration ==
Nandeshwar falls under the governance of a Gram Panchayat and is part of the Mangalwedha Vidhan Sabha constituency and the Solapur Lok Sabha constituency. Local governance is managed by elected representatives under the Panchayati Raj system. Current Sarpanch of the village is Sajabai Dada Garande

The population of this village is approximately 10,000. The village is passes through by m.s.h.171 Jath-Mangalwedha state highway and main district road Sangole-Nandeshwar-Chadchan road.

The town is divided into several areas:

- Mashner Vasti
- Jharewadi
- Harshbodhi Nagar
- Indiranagr
- Balkrishna Nagar
- Jaibhavaninagar
- Hanuman galli
- Kumbhar-chambhar galli.
- Jankarvasti
- Patil Vasti bhose-road
- Metakari Vasti Siddhankeri road

== Location ==
It is located on 18 km from Mangalwedha tehsil and 73 km from Solapur district. Sangole is west on 22 km and Jath is south on 38 km.

== Infrastructure ==
Shri balkrishna maharaj temple

=== Banks ===
- Bank of Maharashtra, Nandeshwar
- DCC Bank
- Dhanshri mahila bank
- Kondiram Maharaj co-op bank Nandeshwar
- Lokmangal Bank
- Chetana Patsanstha

=== Schools ===
- Shri balkrishna vidyalaya & Jr.collage nandeshwar
- Z.P. primary school nandeshwar
- z.p. school lavatevasti
- Z.P. School Bandgarwadi
- Z.P. School Masnerwasti
- Z.P. School Zarewadi
