= Sutrapada =

Sutrapada is a city and a municipality in Gir Somnath district in the Indian state of Gujarat. Sutrapada is located 16 km distance from its District Main City Veraval. It is located 445 km distance from its State Main City Gandhinagar.

Sutrapada Taluka has the 47 numbers of villages as following Alidhra, Ajotha, Amrapur, Anand Para, Barevla, Barula, Bhuva-Timbi, Bhuvavada, Bosan, Chagiya, Dhamlej, Gangetha, Ghantiya, Gorakh Madhi, Harnasa, Kadsala, Kadvar, Kanjotar, Khambha, Khera, Lakhapara, Lati, Lodhva, Mahobatpara, Matana, Moradiya, Morasa, Navagam, Padruka, Pipalva, Pransli, Prashnavda, Rakhej, Rangpur, Sara, Singsar, Solaj, Sundarpara, Sutrapada, Thareli, Thordi, Timbdi, Tobra, Umbri, Vadodra (Jhala), Vansavad, Vavdi (Sutra) and Virodar.
