= List of Monuments of National Importance in Gujarat =

This is a list of Monuments of National Importance (ASI) as officially recognized by and available through the website of the Archaeological Survey of India in the Indian state Gujarat. The monument identifier is a combination of the abbreviation of the subdivision of the list (state, ASI circle) and the numbering as published on the website of the ASI. 203 Monuments of National Importance have been recognized by the ASI in Gujarat.

== List of monuments of national importance ==
For technical reasons the monuments in Ahmedabad are displayed in a separate list. Please see the Ahmedabad page (N-GJ-1 to N-GJ-65) for that list.

SL. No.	Description	Location	Address	District	Coordinates	Image
N-GJ-66	Ancient site Gohilwad Timbo (Mound)	Amreli		Amreli	21°37′N 71°12′E	Ancient site Gohilwad Timbo (Mound) More images
N-GJ-67	Fresco on the wall of Kashiviswanath temple	Padar Singha		Amreli	21°39′42″N 71°30′55″E	Fresco on the wall of Kashiviswanath temple More images
N-GJ-68	Ancient Site	Venivadar		Amreli	21°38′44″N 71°08′59″E	Ancient Site More images
N-GJ-69	Borsad Stepwell	Borsad		Anand	22°24′40″N 72°54′04″E	Borsad Stepwell More images
N-GJ-70	Jami Masjid, Khambhat	Khambhat		Anand	22°18′36″N 72°37′04″E	Jami Masjid, Khambhat More images
N-GJ-71	Ancient site / Mound	Sihor		Bhavnagar	21°42′22″N 71°57′54″E	Upload Photo
N-GJ-72	Darbargadh	Sihor		Bhavnagar	21°42′39″N 71°58′00″E	Upload Photo
N-GJ-73	Ancient site / Mound	Vala (Vallabhi)		Bhavnagar	21°53′38″N 71°52′28″E	Upload Photo
N-GJ-74	Jain temples	Talaja		Bhavnagar	21°21′27″N 72°01′36″E	Jain temples More images
N-GJ-75	Talaja Caves	Talaja		Bhavnagar	21°21′N 72°02′E	Talaja Caves More images
N-GJ-76	Jami Masjid	Bharuch		Bharuch	21°41′31″N 72°58′55″E	Jami Masjid More images
N-GJ-77	Old Ruined temple of Mahadev	Bavka		Dahod	22°45′08″N 74°12′04″E	Old Ruined temple of Mahadev More images
N-GJ-78	Tomb of Sikandar Shah	Halol		Panchmahal	22°30′19″N 73°28′23″E	Tomb of Sikandar Shah More images
N-GJ-79	Ek-Minar-ki-Masjid	Halol		Panchmahal	22°29′22″N 73°30′54″E	Ek-Minar-ki-Masjid More images
N-GJ-80	Panch-Mahuda-ki-Masjid	Halol	Sultanpura	Panchmahal	22°29′24″N 73°30′01″E	Panch-Mahuda-ki-Masjid More images
N-GJ-81	Tomb near Panch Mahuda Ki Masjid	Halol	Sultanpura	Panchmahal	22°29′39″N 73°30′01″E	Upload Photo
N-GJ-82	Helical Stepped well (With 50 feet space around at pathway 10 feet wide to nearest road)	Champaner		Panchmahal	22°29′04″N 73°30′56″E	Helical Stepped well (With 50 feet space around at pathway 10 feet wide to nearest road) More images
N-GJ-83	Sakar Khan's Dargah	Champaner		Panchmahal	22°28′58″N 73°31′06″E	Sakar Khan's Dargah More images
N-GJ-84	City Gate	Champaner		Panchmahal	22°28′59″N 73°31′20″E	City Gate More images
N-GJ-85	Citadel walls	Champaner		Panchmahal	22°29′00″N 73°31′52″E	Citadel walls More images
N-GJ-86	City walls at S.E. corner of the citadel going up the hill	Champaner		Panchmahal	22°29′00″N 73°32′13″E	City walls at S.E. corner of the citadel going up the hill More images
N-GJ-87	East and South Bhadra Gates 22.484898°N 73.536494°E	Champaner		Panchmahal	22°29′00″N 73°31′57″E	East and South Bhadra Gates 22.484898°N 73.536494°E More images
N-GJ-88	Sahar ki Masjid (Bohrani)	Champaner		Panchmahal	22°29′01″N 73°31′46″E	Sahar ki Masjid (Bohrani) More images
N-GJ-89	Three cells	Champaner		Panchmahal	22°29′04″N 73°31′52″E	Upload Photo
N-GJ-90	Mandvi or Custom House	Champaner		Panchmahal	22°29′03″N 73°31′54″E	Mandvi or Custom House More images
N-GJ-91	Jami Masjid	Champaner		Panchmahal	22°29′09″N 73°32′06″E	Jami Masjid More images
N-GJ-92	Stepwell	Champaner		Panchmahal	22°29′11″N 73°32′15″E	Stepwell More images
N-GJ-93	Kevada Masjid	Champaner		Panchmahal	22°29′22″N 73°31′53″E	Kevada Masjid More images
N-GJ-94	Tomb with a Brick dome in the centre and small corner domes (Bada Talb ka Maqbara)	Champaner		Panchmahal	22°29′41″N 73°33′01″E	Upload Photo
N-GJ-95	Canatoph of Kevda Masjid	Champaner		Panchmahal	22°29′26″N 73°32′03″E	Canatoph of Kevda Masjid More images
N-GJ-96	Nagina Masjid	Champaner		Panchmahal	22°29′39″N 73°31′45″E	Nagina Masjid More images
N-GJ-97	Cenotaph of Nagina Masjid	Champaner		Panchmahal	22°29′39″N 73°31′49″E	Cenotaph of Nagina Masjid More images
N-GJ-98	Lila Gumbaj ki Masjid	Champaner		Panchmahal	22°29′22″N 73°32′29″E	Lila Gumbaj ki Masjid More images
N-GJ-99	Kabutarkhana Pavilion (Khajuri Masjid)	Champaner		Panchmahal	22°29′39″N 73°33′22″E	Kabutarkhana Pavilion (Khajuri Masjid) More images
N-GJ-100	Kamani Masjid	Champaner		Panchmahal	22°28′59″N 73°32′42″E	Kamani Masjid More images
N-GJ-101	Bawa Man's Mosque	Champaner		Panchmahal	22°28′45″N 73°32′01″E	Bawa Man's Mosque More images
N-GJ-102	Gate No. 1 Atak Gate (with two gateways)	Pavagad hill		Panchmahal	22°28′35″N 73°31′51″E	Gate No. 1 Atak Gate (with two gateways) More images
N-GJ-103	Gate No. 2 (with three gateways) Budhiya gate	Pavagad hill		Panchmahal	22°27′55″N 73°31′19″E	Upload Photo
N-GJ-104	Gate No. 3 Moti gate Sadanshah-Gate	Pavagad hill		Panchmahal	22°27′41″N 73°31′40″E	Gate No. 3 Moti gate Sadanshah-Gate More images
N-GJ-105	Gate No. 4 with big bastion with cells in the interior.	Pavagad hill		Panchmahal	22°28′03″N 73°30′55″E	Gate No. 4 with big bastion with cells in the interior. More images
N-GJ-106	Sat Manzil with steps right up to bastions	Pavagad hill		Panchmahal	22°27′44″N 73°30′59″E	Sat Manzil with steps right up to bastions More images
N-GJ-107	Mint above Gate No. 4	Pavagad hill		Panchmahal	22°28′14″N 73°31′26″E	Upload Photo
N-GJ-108	Gate No. 5 Gulan Bulan Gate	Pavagad hill		Panchmahal	22°28′05″N 73°31′24″E	Upload Photo
N-GJ-109	Gate No. 6 Buland Darwaja	Pavagad hill		Panchmahal	22°27′55″N 73°31′14″E	Upload Photo
N-GJ-110	Makai Kothar	Pavagad hill		Panchmahal	22°27′55″N 73°31′14″E	Upload Photo
N-GJ-111	Patai Rawal's Palace with tanks	Pavagad hill		Panchmahal	22°27′42″N 73°31′39″E	Patai Rawal's Palace with tanks More images
N-GJ-112	Gate No. 7 Makai Gate	Pavagad hill		Panchmahal	22°27′56″N 73°31′10″E	Upload Photo
N-GJ-113	Gate No. 8 Tarapore Gate	Pavagad hill		Panchmahal	22°28′03″N 73°30′56″E	Upload Photo
N-GJ-114	Fort of Pavagad & ruined Hindu temples & Jain temples on the top of Pavagad hills	Pavagad hill		Panchmahal	22°28′01″N 73°30′55″E	Fort of Pavagad & ruined Hindu temples & Jain temples on the top of Pavagad hills More images
N-GJ-115	Navlakha Kothar	Pavagad hill		Panchmahal	22°28′02″N 73°30′34″E	Navlakha Kothar More images
N-GJ-116	Walls of fort on top	Pavagad hill		Panchmahal	22°27′49″N 73°31′06″E	Upload Photo
N-GJ-117	Rudra Mahalaya temple	Desar		Panchmahal	22°21′02″N 73°33′07″E	Rudra Mahalaya temple More images
N-GJ-118	Kankeshvara Mahadev temple	Kakanpur		Panchmahal	22°49′56″N 73°29′03″E	Upload Photo
N-GJ-119	Ratnesvara Old temple with sculptures screen	Ratanpur		Panchmahal	22°50′22″N 73°25′55″E	Upload Photo
N-GJ-120	Rudabai stepwell or Adalaj Stepwell	Adalaj		Gandhinagar	23°10′N 72°35′E	Rudabai stepwell or Adalaj Stepwell More images
N-GJ-121	Durvasa Rishi's Ashram & its site (Pindara Group of Temples)	Pindara		Devbhoomi Dwarka	22°15′52″N 69°15′10″E	Durvasa Rishi's Ashram & its site (Pindara Group of Temples) More images
N-GJ-122	Kalika Mata Temple	Old Dhrewad		Jamnagar	22°08′58″N 69°04′22″E	Upload Photo
N-GJ-123	Gokeshwara Mahadev temple	Lowrali		Jamnagar	22°10′26″N 69°05′31″E	Upload Photo
N-GJ-124	Gandhi fortress & temple in Survey no.106	Old Dhink		Jamnagar	22°12′28″N 69°04′49″E	Upload Photo
N-GJ-125	Temples of Rama Lakshamana	Baradia		Devbhumi Dwarka	22°11′44″N 69°01′09″E	Temples of Rama Lakshamana More images
N-GJ-126	Dwarkadhish Group of Temples with its outer compounds SNO. 1607, 1608, 1609.	Dwarka		Devbhumi Dwarka	22°14′17″N 68°58′02″E	Dwarkadhish Group of Temples with its outer compounds SNO. 1607, 1608, 1609. More images
N-GJ-127	Kshatrapa Inscriptions	Dwarka		Devbhumi Dwarka	22°14′N 68°58′E	Upload Photo
N-GJ-128	Rukmini Devi Temple	Dwarka		Devbhumi Dwarka	22°15′27″N 68°57′52″E	Rukmini Devi Temple More images
N-GJ-129	Dhrasanvel Temple (Magderu)	Dhrasanvel		Devbhoomi Dwarka	22°17′21″N 69°03′05″E	Dhrasanvel Temple (Magderu) More images
N-GJ-130	Guhaditya temple in S.No. 655	Varvada		Jamnagar	22°18′04″N 68°59′13″E	Upload Photo
N-GJ-131	Junagadhi (Jain) Temple	Vasai		Jamnagar	22°19′05″N 68°59′57″E	Upload Photo
N-GJ-132	Kankeshvara Mahadeva temple & other shrines	Vasai		Jamnagar	22°19′06″N 68°59′50″E	Upload Photo
N-GJ-133	Gop Temple	Nani Gop		Jamnagar	22°01′43″N 69°55′44″E	Gop Temple More images
N-GJ-134	Ashokan Rock (Edicts)	Junagadh		Junagadh	21°31′33″N 70°28′59″E	Ashokan Rock (Edicts) More images
N-GJ-135	Uparkot Caves (Buddhist Cave) of Junagadh Buddhist Cave Groups	Junagadh		Junagadh	21°31′33″N 70°28′09″E	Uparkot Caves (Buddhist Cave) of Junagadh Buddhist Cave Groups More images
N-GJ-136	Baba Pyare and Khapra Kodia caves of Junagadh Buddhist Cave Groups	Junagadh		Junagadh	21°31′12″N 70°28′05″E	Baba Pyare and Khapra Kodia caves of Junagadh Buddhist Cave Groups More images
N-GJ-137	Ancient Mound	Intwa		Junagadh	21°33′06″N 70°29′30″E	Ancient Mound More images
N-GJ-138	Jami Masjid	Mangrol		Junagadh	21°07′10″N 70°06′38″E	Upload Photo
N-GJ-139	Bibi Masjid	Mangrol		Junagadh	21°07′18″N 70°06′52″E	Upload Photo
N-GJ-140	Raveli Masjid	Mangrol		Junagadh	21°07′18″N 70°06′46″E	Upload Photo
N-GJ-141	Ranchhod Rayaji Temple with wasterland around the chowk of Mahadeva Temple	Mul Dwarka		Gir Somnath	20°45′34″N 70°39′40″E	Ranchhod Rayaji Temple with wasterland around the chowk of Mahadeva Temple More images
N-GJ-142	Vithalbhai Haveli	Vaso		Kheda	22°39′40″N 72°45′21″E	Upload Photo
N-GJ-143	Bhamaria Well	Mahamadabad		Kheda	22°48′42″N 72°44′57″E	Bhamaria Well More images
N-GJ-144	Temple of Galteshwar	Sarnal		Kheda	22°47′06″N 73°16′39″E	Temple of Galteshwar More images
N-GJ-145	Tomb of Saif-ud-din & Nizam-ud-din	Sojali		Kheda	22°50′30″N 72°46′20″E	Upload Photo
N-GJ-146	Tomb of Mubarak Saiyyad (Roza Rozi Dargah Sharif)	Sojali		Kheda	22°50′33″N 72°46′20″E	Tomb of Mubarak Saiyyad (Roza Rozi Dargah Sharif)
N-GJ-147	Rao Lakhpatji Chhatri	Bhuj		Kachchh	23°14′47″N 69°39′28″E	Rao Lakhpatji Chhatri More images
N-GJ-148	Siva temple	Kotai		Kachchh	23°23′04″N 69°46′56″E	Upload Photo
N-GJ-149	Excavated Site (Surkotada)	Surkotada		Kachchh	23°53′12″N 70°12′24″E	Upload Photo
N-GJ-150	Malai Mata temple	Palodar		Mehsana	23°38′28″N 72°21′38″E	Malai Mata temple More images
N-GJ-151	Hingloji Mata temple (Hinglaj Mata)	Khandosan		Mehsana	23°44′14″N 72°28′23″E	Upload Photo
N-GJ-152	Sabha Mandapa (Double Shrines) & the ancient shrines (Panchmukhi Mahadev temple)	Khandosan		Mehsana	23°44′14″N 72°28′26″E	Upload Photo
N-GJ-153	Jasmalnathji Mahadev Temple (Vaijnath Mahadev temple)	Asoda		Mehsana	23°35′00″N 72°35′23″E	Jasmalnathji Mahadev Temple (Vaijnath Mahadev temple) More images
N-GJ-154	Ajpal Kund (Gauri Kund)	Vadnagar		Mehsana	23°46′58″N 72°38′54″E	Ajpal Kund (Gauri Kund) More images
N-GJ-155	Inscription and Arjun Bari Gate	Vadnagar		Mehsana	23°47′18″N 72°38′21″E	Inscription and Arjun Bari Gate More images
N-GJ-156	Kirti Toran	Vadnagar		Mehsana	23°47′27″N 72°38′32″E	Kirti Toran More images
N-GJ-157	Kund	Vijapur		Mehsana	23°33′52″N 72°45′27″E	Upload Photo
N-GJ-158	Sun temple, Surya kund with adjoining other temples and loose sculptures	Modhera		Mehsana	23°35′02″N 72°07′58″E	Sun temple, Surya kund with adjoining other temples and loose sculptures More images
N-GJ-159	Gateway of Khan Sarovar	Patan		Patan	23°50′22″N 72°06′55″E	Upload Photo
N-GJ-160	Rani ki vav	Patan		Patan	23°51′31″N 72°06′03″E	Rani ki vav More images
N-GJ-161	Sahastralinga Tank (Excavated)	Anavada		Patan	23°51′45″N 72°05′52″E	Sahastralinga Tank (Excavated) More images
N-GJ-162	Shaikh Farid Tomb	Patan		Patan	23°51′59″N 72°05′47″E	Upload Photo
N-GJ-163	Jami Masjid	Sidhpur		Patan	23°55′10″N 72°22′44″E	Upload Photo
N-GJ-164	Ruins of Rudra Mahalaya Temple, Sidhpur	Sidhpur		Patan	23°55′10″N 72°22′37″E	Ruins of Rudra Mahalaya Temple, Sidhpur More images
N-GJ-165	Nilkantheswar Mahadev temple	Sunak		Patan	23°48′10″N 72°19′03″E	Nilkantheswar Mahadev temple More images
N-GJ-166	Sivai Mata temple	Sunak		Patan	23°48′11″N 72°18′59″E	Upload Photo
N-GJ-167	Nilkantheswar Mahadev temple	Ruhavi		Patan	23°46′09″N 72°18′02″E	Upload Photo
N-GJ-168	Two small shrines Sanderi Mata temple	Sander		Patan	23°46′04″N 72°15′33″E	Two small shrines Sanderi Mata temple More images
N-GJ-169	Sitamata temple	Piludra		Patan	23°39′54″N 72°25′55″E	Upload Photo
N-GJ-170	Torana with a Sun image	Piludra		Patan	23°39′50″N 72°25′54″E	Upload Photo
N-GJ-171	Limboji Mata temple	Delmal		Patan	23°38′35″N 71°59′31″E	Limboji Mata temple More images
N-GJ-172	Kirti Mandir, Porbandar (House where Mahatma Gandhi was born)	Porbandar		Porbandar	21°38′28″N 69°36′02″E	Kirti Mandir, Porbandar (House where Mahatma Gandhi was born) More images
N-GJ-173	Old Parsvanath temple	Miyani		Porbandar	21°50′23″N 69°22′56″E	Upload Photo
N-GJ-174	Dhank Caves	Dhank		Rajkot	21°50′02″N 70°04′59″E	Dhank Caves More images
N-GJ-175	Tomb of Sikandarshah	Prantji		Sabarkanta	23°26′08″N 72°51′28″E	Tomb of Sikandarshah More images
N-GJ-176	Roda Group of Temples	Khed & Roda		Sabarkanta	23°39′33″N 73°04′59″E	Roda Group of Temples More images
N-GJ-177	Dargah known as Khawaja Dana Saheb's Rouza	Surat		Surat	21°11′28″N 72°49′16″E	Dargah known as Khawaja Dana Saheb's Rouza More images
N-GJ-178	Old English Tombs	Surat		Surat	21°12′39″N 72°49′33″E	Old English Tombs More images
N-GJ-179	Tomb of Khawaja Safar Sulemani (Khudawand Khan Rojo)	Surat		Surat	21°12′15″N 72°49′25″E	Tomb of Khawaja Safar Sulemani (Khudawand Khan Rojo)
N-GJ-180	Old Dutch & Armenian Tombs & Cemeteries	Surat		Surat	21°12′35″N 72°49′35″E	Old Dutch & Armenian Tombs & Cemeteries More images
N-GJ-181	Ancient site comprising S.Plot No.535	Kamrej		Surat	21°16′57″N 72°58′02″E	Upload Photo
N-GJ-182	Fateh Burj	Vyara		Surat	21°06′52″N 73°23′42″E	Upload Photo
N-GJ-183	Ranakdevi's Temple	Wadhwan		Surendranagar	22°42′49″N 71°40′34″E	Ranakdevi's Temple More images
N-GJ-184	Ancient Mound (Rangpur, Gujarat)	Rangpur		Surendranagar	22°24′02″N 71°55′43″E	Upload Photo
N-GJ-185	Sun Temple	Thangadh		Surendranagar	22°35′50″N 71°12′53″E	Sun Temple More images
N-GJ-186	Navlakha temple	Sejakpur		Surendranagar	22°27′26″N 71°24′45″E	Navlakha temple More images
N-GJ-187	Ancient Site/Mound (Ganesh temple) in village	Sejakpur		Surendranagar	22°27′25″N 71°24′52″E	Upload Photo
N-GJ-188	Darbargarh	Halwad		Surendranagar	23°00′42″N 71°10′43″E	Upload Photo
N-GJ-189	Ananteshwara temple	Bhadia Anandpur		Surendranagar	22°13′28″N 71°10′03″E	Upload Photo
N-GJ-190	Fresco Rooms in Bhau Tambekar's Wada	Vadodara		Vadodara	22°18′10″N 73°11′49″E	Fresco Rooms in Bhau Tambekar's Wada More images
N-GJ-191	Historic Site S.No. 431,435	Vadodara		Vadodara	22°18′03″N 73°10′52″E	Historic Site S.No. 431,435
N-GJ-192	Hazira or Qutbuddin Mahmad Khan's Tomb (Hazira Maqbara)	Danteshwar		Vadodara	22°16′41″N 73°12′24″E	Hazira or Qutbuddin Mahmad Khan's Tomb (Hazira Maqbara) More images
N-GJ-193	Ancient Site (Excavated) at Kayavarohan	Kayavarohan		Vadodara	22°04′52″N 73°14′59″E	Ancient Site (Excavated) at Kayavarohan More images
N-GJ-194	Gateway of Torana	Kayavarohan		Vadodara	22°04′57″N 73°14′52″E	Gateway of Torana More images
N-GJ-195	Ancient site of Sandhiyapura	Goraj		Vadodara	22°19′54″N 73°28′35″E	Upload Photo
N-GJ-196	Vadodara Gate & its adjacent construction	Dabhoi		Vadodara	22°08′04″N 73°24′56″E	Vadodara Gate & its adjacent construction More images
N-GJ-197	Hira Gate with S.No. 38, 41, 45, 47 & Ticca No. 102&103.	Dabhoi		Vadodara	22°08′01″N 73°25′28″E	Hira Gate with S.No. 38, 41, 45, 47 & Ticca No. 102&103. More images
N-GJ-198	Mahudi (Champaneri) Gate & adjacent construction	Dabhoi		Vadodara	22°08′16″N 73°25′07″E	Mahudi (Champaneri) Gate & adjacent construction More images
N-GJ-199	Nandodi Gate with adjacent construction	Dabhoi		Vadodara	22°07′47″N 73°25′13″E	Nandodi Gate with adjacent construction More images
N-GJ-200	Saptamukhi Vav	Dabhoi		Vadodara	22°08′07″N 73°25′19″E	Saptamukhi Vav More images
N-GJ-201	Microlithic site S.No. 311,12,13 & 298	Amarapura		Vadodara	22°40′36″N 73°16′17″E	Upload Photo
N-GJ-202	Dholavira (Ancient Site (Kotada))	Dholavira	Bhachau Taluka	Kutch	23°53′10″N 70°13′00″E	Dholavira (Ancient Site (Kotada)) More images
N-GJ-203	Archeological Site and Remains	Juni Kuran, Bhuj	Bhuj Taluka	Kutch	23°56′47″N 69°46′01″E	Upload Photo

== See also ==
- List of Monuments of National Importance in India for other Monuments of National Importance in India
- List of State Protected Monuments in Gujarat
