= Gohilwad =

Gohilwad or State of Gohilwad may refer to the following places in Gujarat, western India:

- Gohilwad or Gohilwar prant, one of the four districts of Kathiawar in Gujarat, named after the Gohil Rajputs
- Bhavnagar State, a princely state, as land of its ruling Rajput clan, the Gohils
- Gohilwad Timbo, a mountain
