= Prantij =

Town in Sabarkatha, Gujarat, India

- Town
- Nickname: Praptipura or Praptinagar
- Prantij (Gujarat) Prantij (India)
- Coordinates: 23.43842°N 72.85718°E
- Country: India
- State: Gujarat
- District: Sabarkantha
- Founded by or Named for: c. 1480 (Tomb of Sikandar Shah by Mahmud Begada)
- Founder: Mahmud Begada (built the Tomb of Sikandar Shah)
- Named for: Tomb of Sikandar Shah

Government
  - Body: Prantij Municipality
  - Chairperson: Pradeepsinh Rathore

Area
  - Total: 20.43 km^{2} (7.89 sq mi)
  - Sub-district (taluka): 411.0 km^{2} (158.7 sq mi)
- Elevation: 98 m (322 ft)

Population (2011)
  - Total: 23,596 (2,011 town) or 161,279 (2,011 sub-district)3
  - Density: 1,155/km^{2} (2,991/sq mi)

Languages
  - Official: Gujarati, Hindi
- Time zone: UTC+5:30 (IST)
- Pin Code: 383205
- Vehicle registration: GJ-09

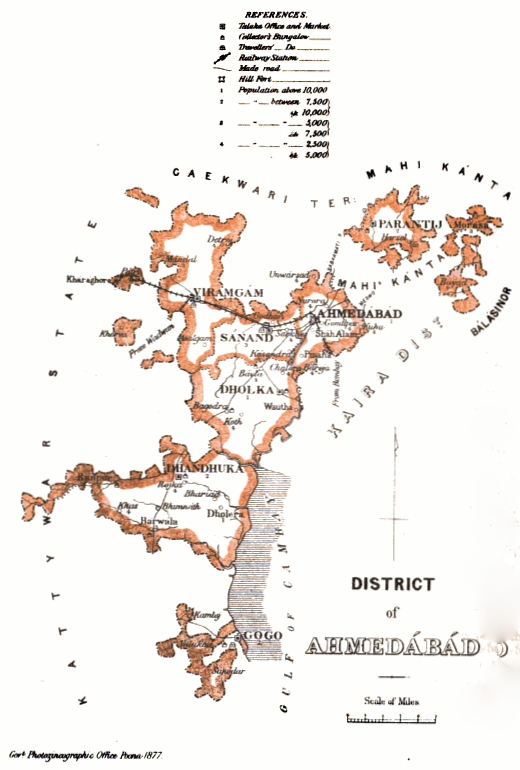
Prantij Taluka, Ahmedabad District — Bombay Presidency Map (1877)

Prantij is a town and a municipality in Sabarkantha district in the Indian state of Gujarat.

== Geography ==
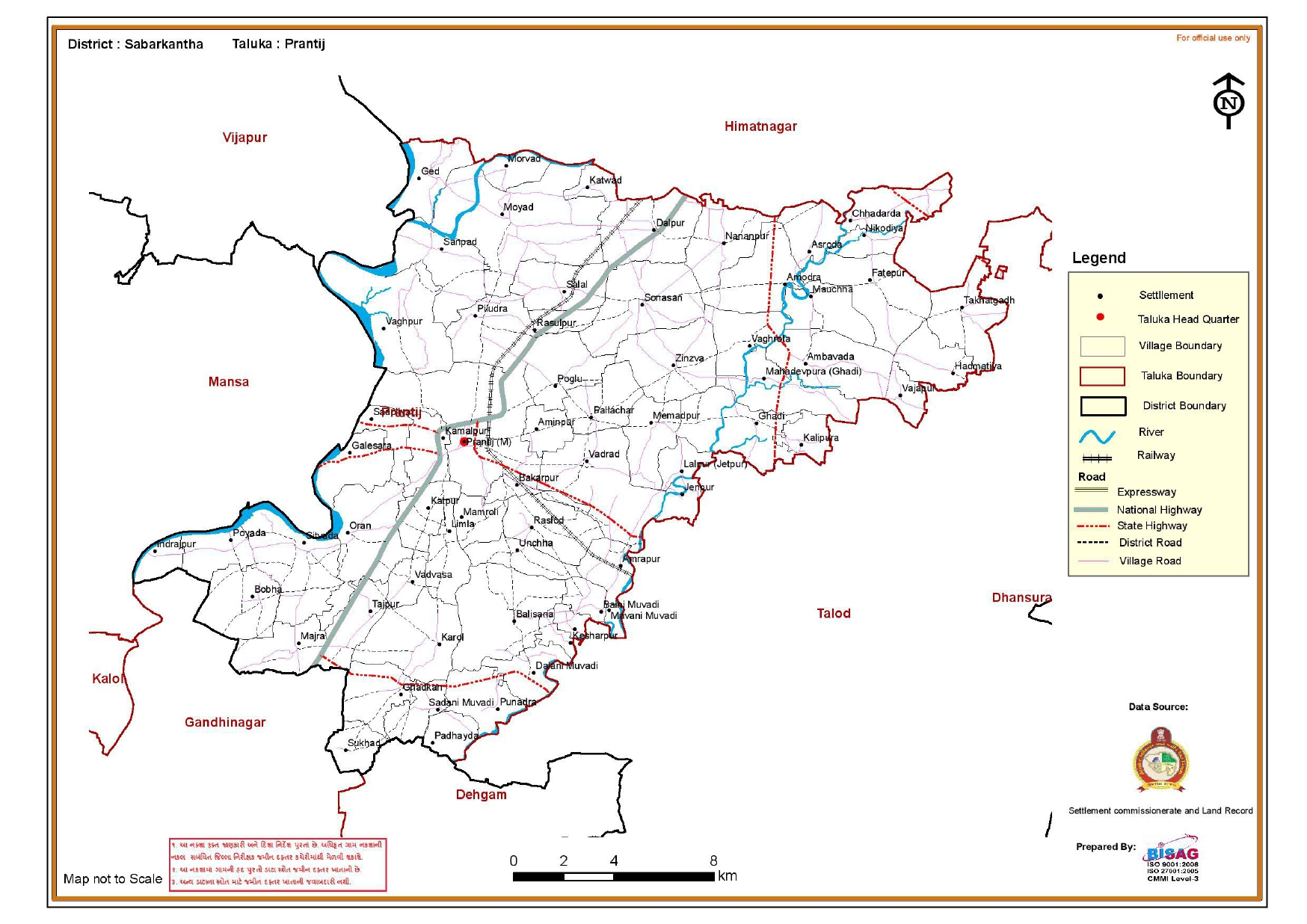
Prantij Taluka, Government of Gujarat

1. Location & Elevation

Prantij is situated in the Sabarkantha district of Gujarat, India, nestled at roughly 23.438° N latitude and 72.857° E longitude, with an average elevation of about 114 meters (374 feet) above sea level .

2. Area & Administrative Extent

The Prantij Taluka (sub-district) spans approximately 411 km², comprising around 20.4 km² of urban area (the town itself) and about 390.6 km² of surrounding rural territories .

3. Terrain & Topography

The terrain is gently rolling—not mountainous—lying within elevations ranging from about 75 to 128 meters, forming a mild undulating landscape typical of the region .

4. Surrounding Features & Waterways

Prantij benefits from the proximity of several rivers that cross Sabarkantha. Notably, the Meshwo River meanders near Prantij, being a tributary of the Vatrak and ultimately part of the Sabarmati basin. It’s significant for local irrigation and agriculture .

The surrounding district also hosts rivers like the Khari, Hathmati, Vatrak, among others, contributing to fertile soils and diversified cropping patterns .

5. Climate & Land Use

Prantij experiences a tropical savanna climate, marked by a pronounced dry season and a moderate monsoon season . Annual rainfall averages around 875 mm, with temperature swings from highs near 40 °C to winter lows around 11 °C. The town is located at 23°26′18″N 72°51′26″E. Average height from sea level is 98 meters (328 feet).

These conditions support agriculture—both in the town and across the taluka—with major crops including cotton, alongside others in the broader district such as paddy, wheat, sorghum, groundnut, tobacco, vegetables, and more .

== Demographics ==
1. Population Overview (2001 Census),

Prantij Municipality (Town): Total population ~23,596, comprising 12,093 males and 11,503 females .

Prantij Taluka (Sub-district): Overall population ~161,279, with 83,566 males and 77,713 females .

2. Urban vs. Rural Distribution

In the Taluka: ~23,596 people live in urban areas (the town), while ~137,683 people live in rural villages .

3. Sex Ratio

Town: 951 females per 1,000 males .

Taluka: Sex ratio stands at around 930 .

4. Literacy Rates

Town: Overall literacy rate is ~74.68%, with male literacy around 81.27%, and female literacy about 67.76% .

Taluka: Literacy stands at ~71.5%, split as 80.27% for males and 62.07% for females .

5. Child Population (Age 0–6 Years)

Town: Approximately 2,639 children (11.18% of population) .

Taluka: Roughly 19,541 children, equating to 12.12% of the total population .

6. Scheduled Castes (SC) & Scheduled Tribes (ST)

Town: SC ~2.93%, ST ~1.26% of the population .

Taluka: SC ~8.18%, ST ~0.37% .

7. Households & Density

Taluka: Total households amount to about 32,503—comprising 4,980 urban and 27,523 rural households. Average household size is roughly 4.96 people .

Population Density: Overall density ~392 persons/km²; urban density can reach ~1,155 persons/km², while rural density is about ~353 persons/km² .

8. Population Growth Projections (Town)

The estimated population of Prantij Municipality in 2025 is approximately 34,200, indicating significant growth since 2011 .

9. Age Profile (Broader Estimate)

Median age is around 25.3 years, with slight gender variation: ~24.5 years for males and ~26.2 for females .

A more detailed breakdown shows youth (below age 15) forms a substantial share of the population .

As of the 2011 Census, Prantij town (under municipal limits) had a population of approximately 23,596, with a fairly balanced gender ratio of 951 females per 1,000 males. Literacy is reasonably high, at about 74.7%, with 81.3% of males and 67.8% of females able to read and write. Young children aged 0–6 make up about 11% of the populace. Scheduled Castes and Scheduled Tribes account for roughly 2.9% and 1.3%, respectively. The municipality comprises nearly 5,000 households and projects to grow to around 34,200 residents by 2025.

Expanding beyond the town, Prantij Taluka hosts around 161,279 residents across 64 villages and the central town. Rural areas house most of this population, with about 137,700 people living in villages and nearly 23,600 in town. The taluka's sex ratio is around 930, slightly lower than the town’s. Its overall literacy rate stands at approximately 71.5% (80.3% for males, 62.1% for females), and children aged 0–6 represent just over 12% of the residents. Scheduled Castes make up about 8.2% of the taluka’s population, while Scheduled Tribes account for just 0.4%. Household figures mirror this spread, with over 32,500 households (nearly 5,000 urban and 27,500 rural), and population density averaging around 392 persons per square kilometer (urban areas showing much higher concentration).

== Interesting places ==
- Khedbrahma – A historic neighbourhood in Prantij, approximately 73 KM from Prantij.
- Tomb of Sikandar Shah, Prantij – A sandstone mausoleum erected around 1480 by Sultan Mahmud Begada in honor of his soldier Sikandar Shah. It is designated as a Monument of National Importance (N-GJ-175).

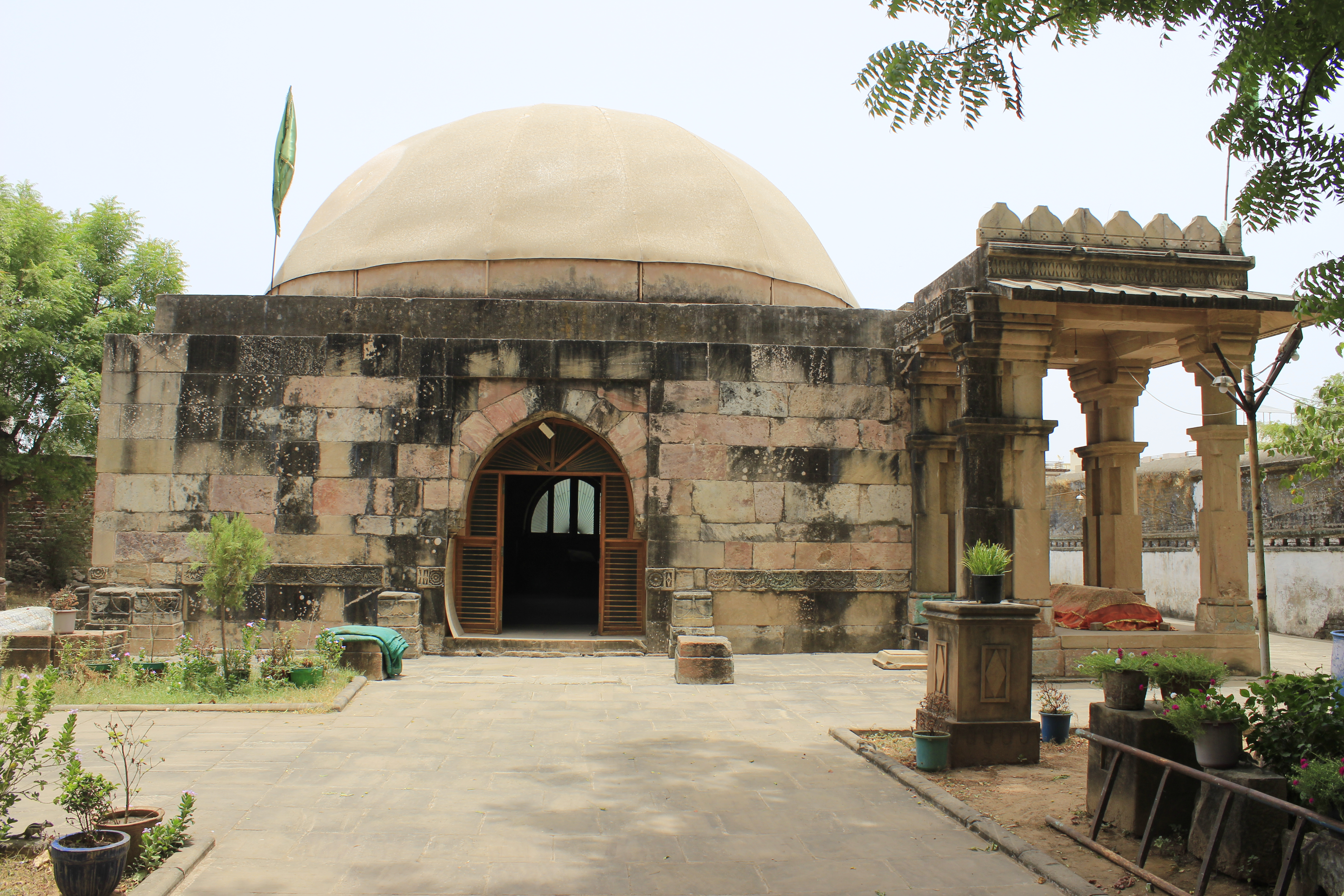
Tomb of Sikandar Shah

- Gopal Mandir – A temple devoted to Lord Krishna, known for its traditional architecture and tranquil garden surroundings. It becomes especially lively during festivals like Janmashtami.
- Gorthiya Mahadev Temple – Located about 8 km from Prantij (in Takaar), this centuries-old Shiva temple showcases pagoda-style wooden architecture with elaborate carvings and celebrates festivals like Mahashivaratri and Guru Purnima.

== Transport ==
=== Rail ===
Prantij railway station is the principal railway station serving Prantij. It is located on the Ahmedabad–Udaipur railway line and falls under the jurisdiction of the Ahmedabad railway division of the Western Railway zone.

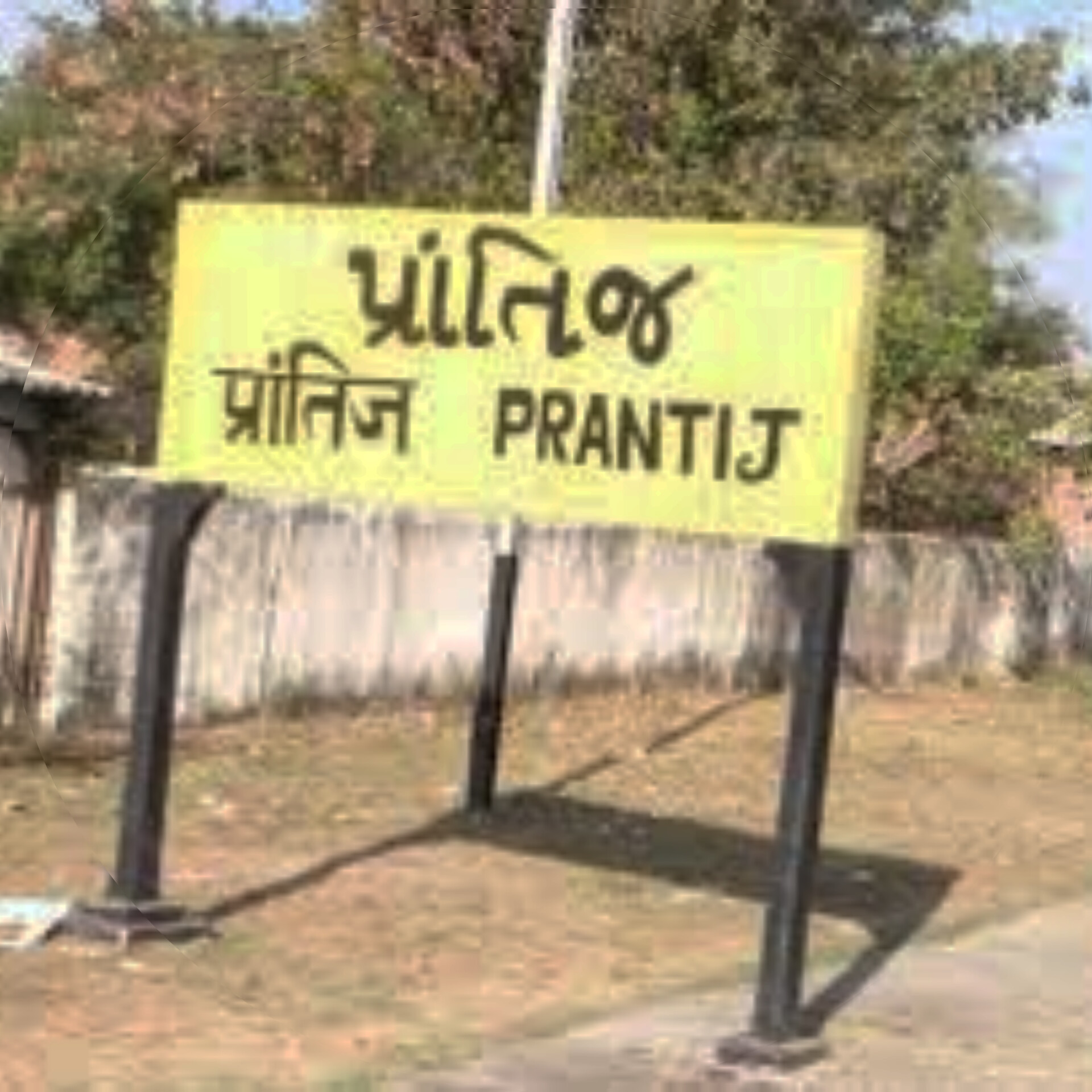
Prantij Railway Station

=== Air ===
The nearest major airport is Sardar Vallabhbhai Patel International Airport in Ahmedabad, approximately 50 KM from Prantij. The airport provides domestic and international air services. Airports in Himmatnagar and Mehsana are geographically closer, but their availability of regular commercial passenger services is limited or subject to change.

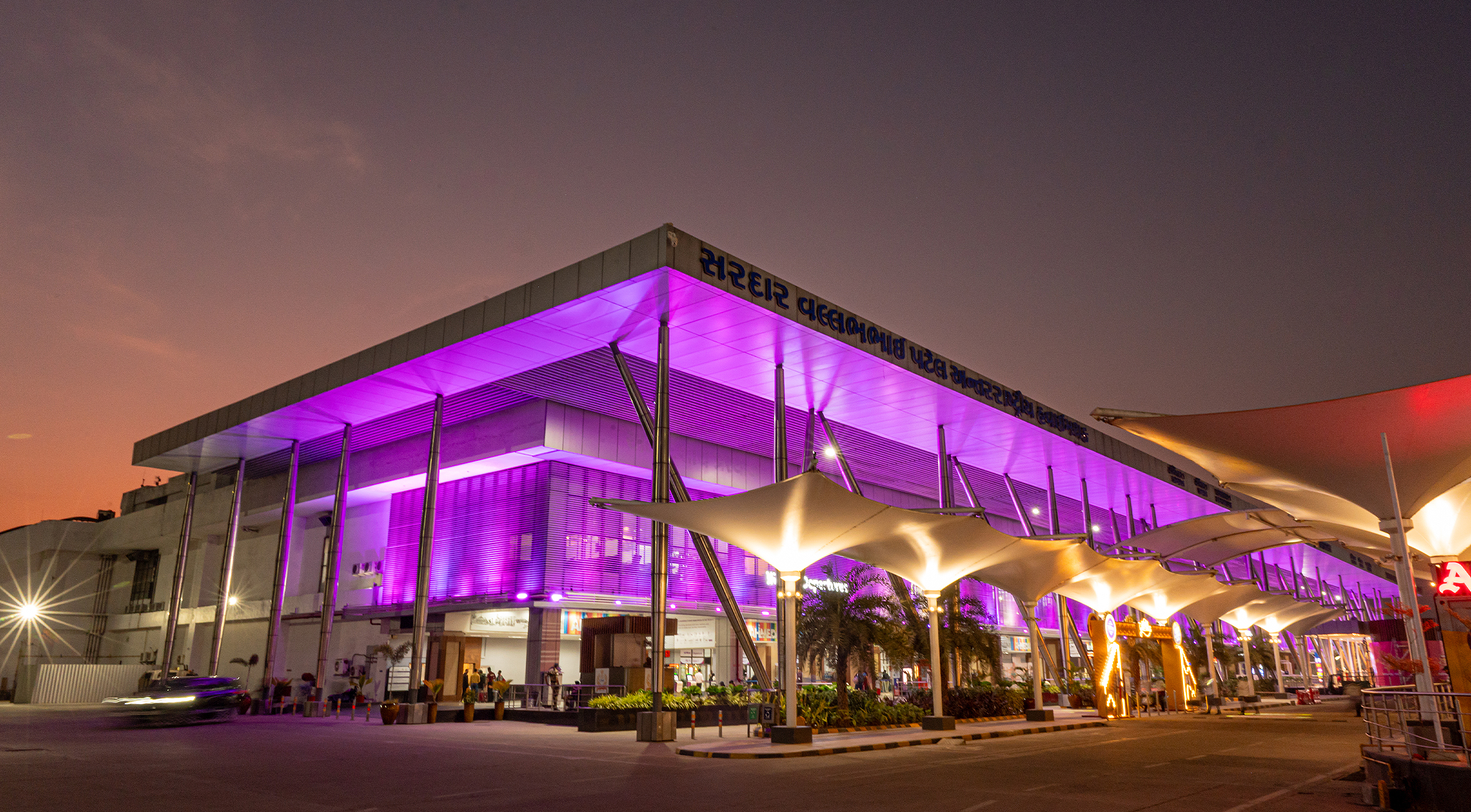
Ahmedabad, SVPI Airport

=== Road ===
Prantij is situated along State Highway 141, which provides road connectivity with towns in Sabarkantha district and with Himmatnagar and Gandhinagar. The town is also connected to surrounding villages by local roads.
