= Jami Masjid, Bharuch =

Mosque in Gujarat, India

Jami Masjid
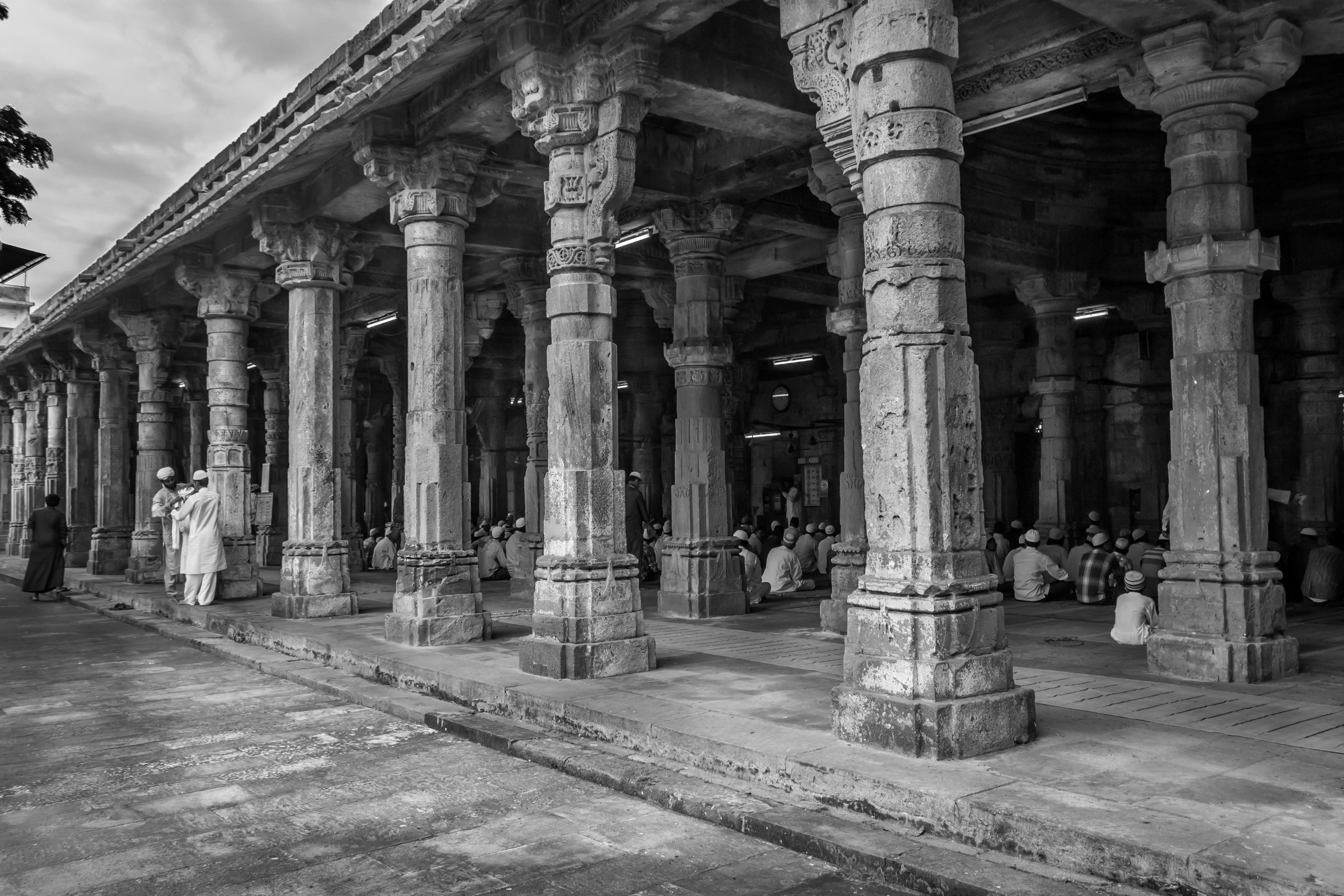
- The mosque in 2013, with worshippers

- Location of the mosque in Gujarat

Religion
- Affiliation: Islam
- Ecclesiastical or organisational status: Mosque
- Status: Active

Location
- Location: Bharuch, Gujarat
- Country: India
- Coordinates: 21°41′31″N 72°58′55″E

Architecture
- Type: Mosque architecture
- Style: Indo-Islamic
- Completed: 14th century

Specifications
- Length: 38.6 metres (126.5 ft)
- Width: 16 metres (52 ft)
- Dome: 13
- Materials: Stone, bricks, mortar

Monument of National Importance
- Official name: Jami Masjid
- Reference no.: N-GJ-76

The Jami Masjid is a Friday mosque located at the top of the hill at Bharuch Fort in Bharuch, in the state of Gujarat, India. Built in the 14th century, it has three large domes, ten smaller domes and 48 pillars. The mosque was built in early 14th century; using the remains of a former Jain temple; and is a Monument of National Importance.

== Architecture ==
The mosque has an open courtyard with gateways and a prayer-chamber at its western side. The prayer-chamber is open pillared verandah which is divided into three compartments. Each compartment is formed by pillars supporting a large dome forming a mandapa. The mosque thus has three large domes, ten smaller domes and 48 pillars in total. There is no façade of arches there.

On the western wall, the qibla features pointed arches and Islamic motifs but are designed on patterns of niches in Hindu temples.

The mosque is built chiefly from the materials of Hindu and Jain temples, including the reuse of brackets, domes, and slabs. The marble door at the entrance to the mosque courtyard was taken from a Jain temple, and a Jina figure is still observable.

=== Historical and architectural heritage ===
The Jami Masjid in Bharuch was built in the fourteenth century using materials from earlier Hindu and Jain temples. The Bharuch district administration records that remains of an ancient Jain temple were used in its construction. Archaeologist James Burgess, in his 1896 study of the architecture of Gujarat, described the reuse of pillars, brackets and other materials from Hindu and Jain shrines. He also identified a marble doorway from a Jain temple, with an image of a Jina still visible on its lintel. These features provide evidence of the reuse of earlier religious building materials, although the precise identity and history of the original structures remain uncertain.

== Epigraphical and Canonical References ==
The earliest Jaina references to Bharuch appear in liturgical texts and legends. The Jag Cintāmaṇi Sūtra, a Jaina prayer traditionally attributed to the Gaṇadhara Gautama, references the temples of Bharuch dedicated to Munisuvrata with the phrase: भरुअच्छहिं मुणिसुव्वय!

The historical and mythological narrative of this pilgrimage center (tīrtha) is extensively recorded across several medieval Jaina texts, including:

- Triṣaṣṭiśalākāpuruṣacaritra by Ācārya Hemacandra
- Vividha Tīrtha Kalpa by Ācārya Jinaprabhasūri
- Munisuvratasvāmicaritra by Ācārya Candrasūri
- Syādvādaratnākara by Vādidevasūri
- Kumārapāla-Pratibodha by Somaprabhasūri
- Aṣṭottarī-Tīrthamālā by Mahendrasūri
- Prabhāvakacarita by Prabhācandrasūri
- Prabandhacintāmaṇi by Merutuṅgasūri
- Kumārapālaprabandha by Gaṇi Jinamaṇḍala
- Upadeśa-Saptati by Gaṇi Somadharma
- Vastupālacarita by Gaṇi Jinaharṣa

== Origin Legend: Aśvāvabodha Tīrtha ==
According to Jaina tradition, during the reign of King Jitaśatru, a horse was prepared for sacrifice in an Aśvamedha Yajña. The 20th Tirthankara, Munisuvrata, arrived on the banks of the Narmada River outside the city, where a samavasaraṇa (divine preaching assembly) was erected. King Jitaśatru arrived at the assembly mounted on the sacrificial horse, and both the king and the horse listened to the divine sermon together.

During the discourse, the Jina narrated the past life of the horse and praised its innate virtues. Upon hearing the sermon, the horse achieved spiritual awakening, and the king subsequently freed the animal. Following its death, the soul of the horse was said to be reborn as a deity in heaven. Out of gratitude, the deity constructed a temple made of precious gems at the site on the Narmada riverbank. Because the temple was founded due to the spiritual enlightenment of a horse (aśva), the site became known as the Aśvāvabodha Tīrtha.

== Evolution to Śakunika Vihāra ==
Over time, the site underwent major renovations and acquired the name Śakunika Vihāra (also referred to as Samadī Vihāra, where samadī translates to "kite" or "bird of prey").

Jaina texts attribute this renovation to Princess Sudarśanā of Siṃhala Dvīpa (modern-day Sri Lanka). In her immediate past life, Sudarśanā was a kite who was mortally wounded; during her final moments, two Jaina monks recited the Namokāra Mantra to her. The spiritual merit (puṇya) of hearing the mantra resulted in her rebirth as a princess. Upon remembering her past life, she traveled to Bharuch to renovate the tīrtha.

== Architectural History and Medieval Patronage ==
The Prabhāvakacarita, Prabandhacintāmaṇi, and Kalpa-Pradīpa record that the early structure of the temple was made of timber. Following a fire that destroyed the wooden shrine, Ācārya Vijayasinhasūri raised funds from the local Jaina community to rebuild it.

The temple underwent subsequent historical developments during the Chaulukya period:

• 1156 CE (Vikram Samvat 1213): The temple was extensively renovated by Āmrabhaṭa, the son of the prominent minister Udayana, and was formally consecrated by the polymath scholar Ācārya Hemacandra.

• 1221–1229 CE (Vikram Samvat 1278–1286): According to the Vastupālatajaphala-Praśasti and the Vastupālacarita, the minister Tejapala (brother of Vastupāla) donated gold finials (kalaśa) to crown the spires (śikhara) of all the shrines within the temple complex.

== Demolition and Conversion ==
Between 1320 and 1325 CE (corresponding to Vikram Samvat 1355–1360), during the military campaigns under the reign of Ghiyath al-Din Tughluq (Ghazi Malik) of the Delhi Sultanate, several Hindu and Jaina temples in the region were targeted. While the principal idols of the Śakunika Vihāra were secretly removed and hidden in safe locations by the Jaina community, the structural complex was dismantled. The architectural remains and pillars of the Jaina temple were subsequently repurposed to construct the city's Juma Masjid (Friday Mosque).

== Gallery ==
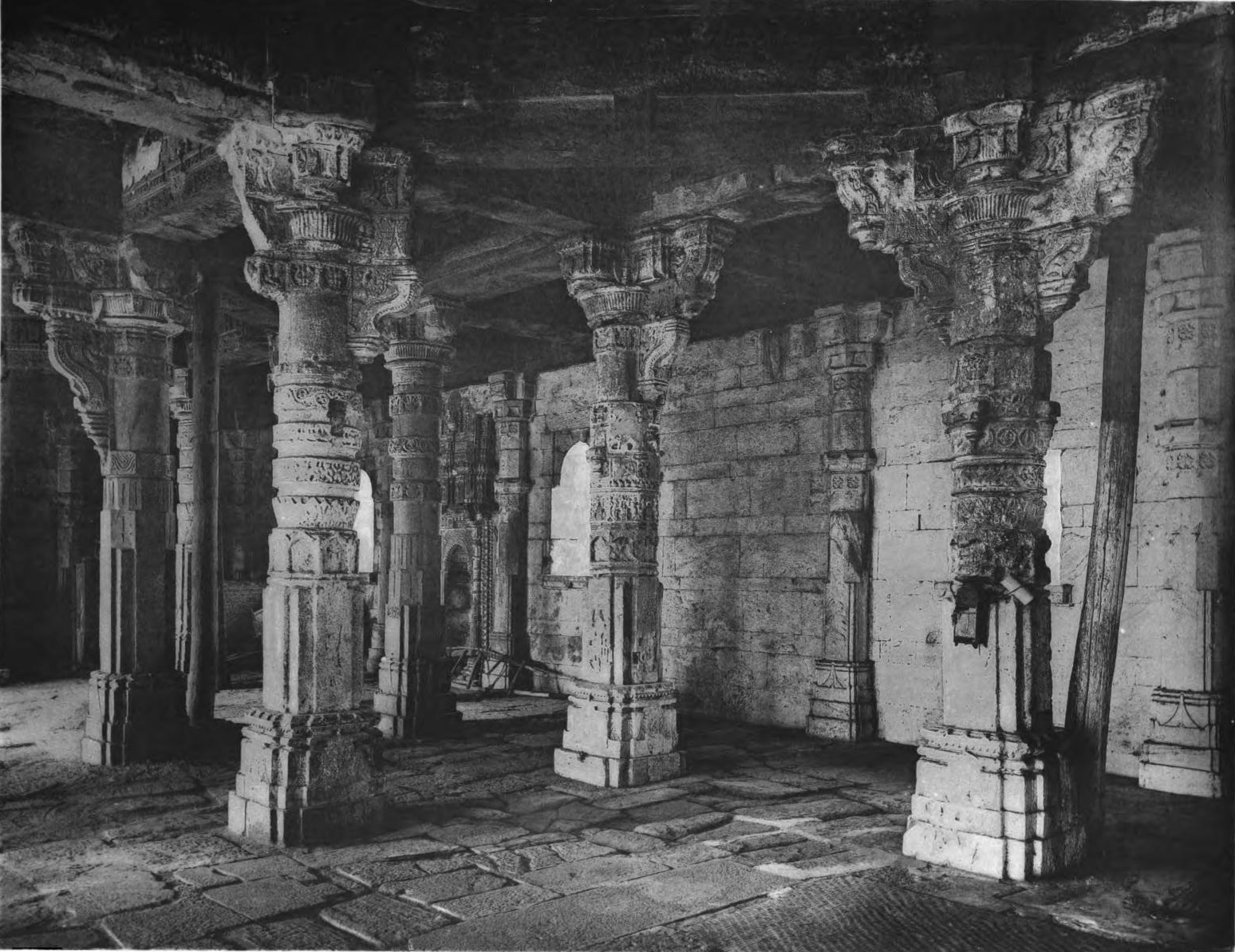
Interior

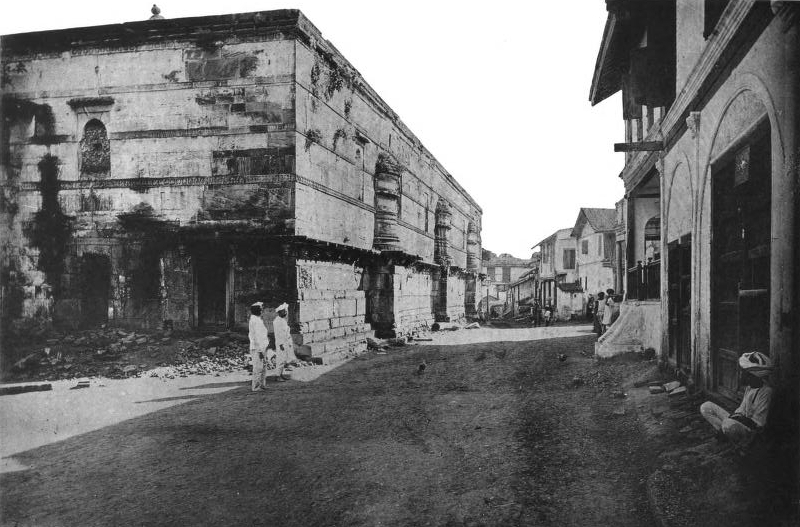
Mosque from the northwest

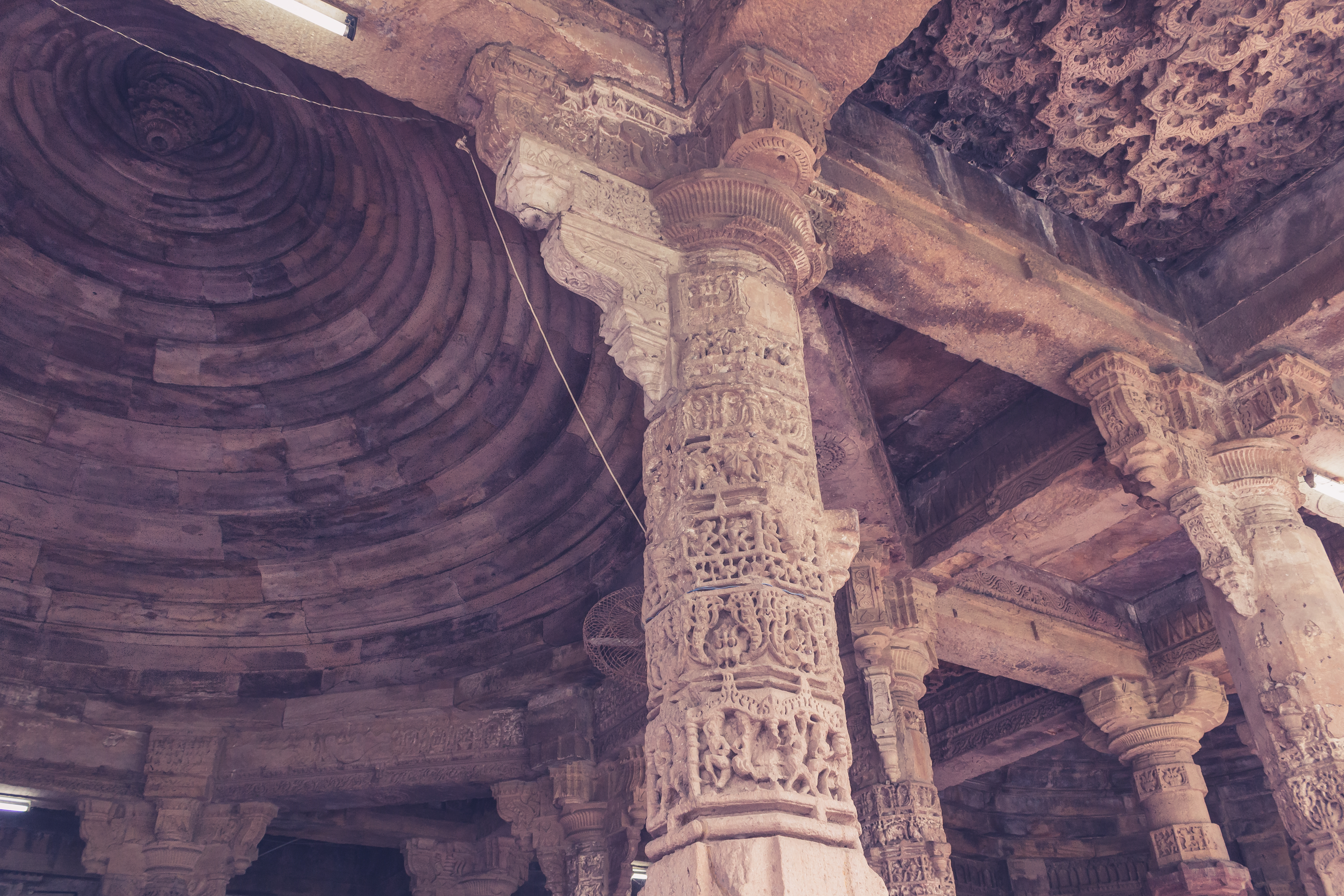
Detail of carvings on the pillar

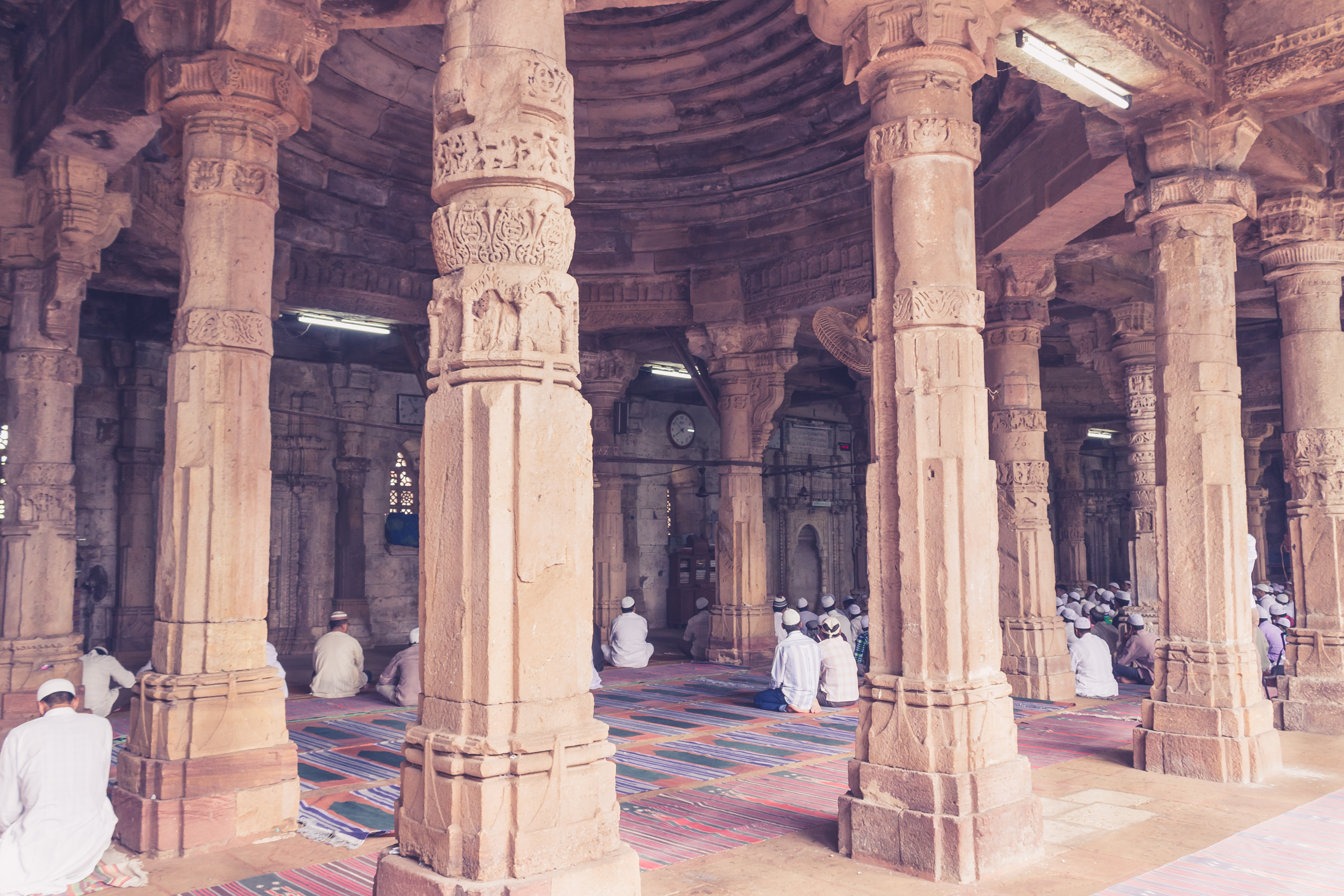
Pillars

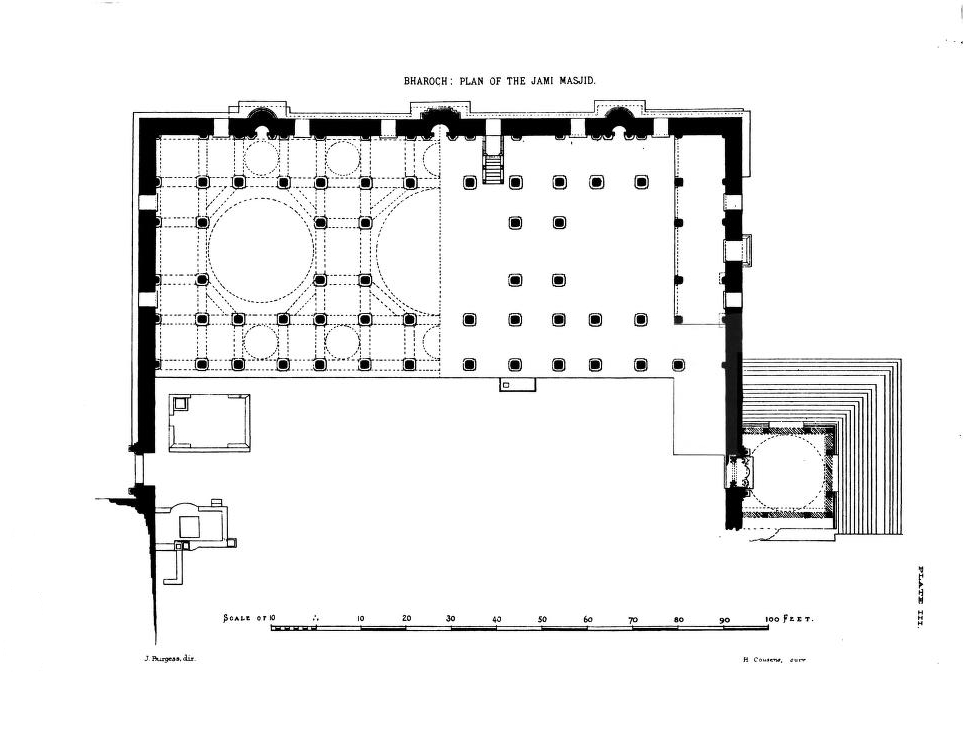
Floor plan

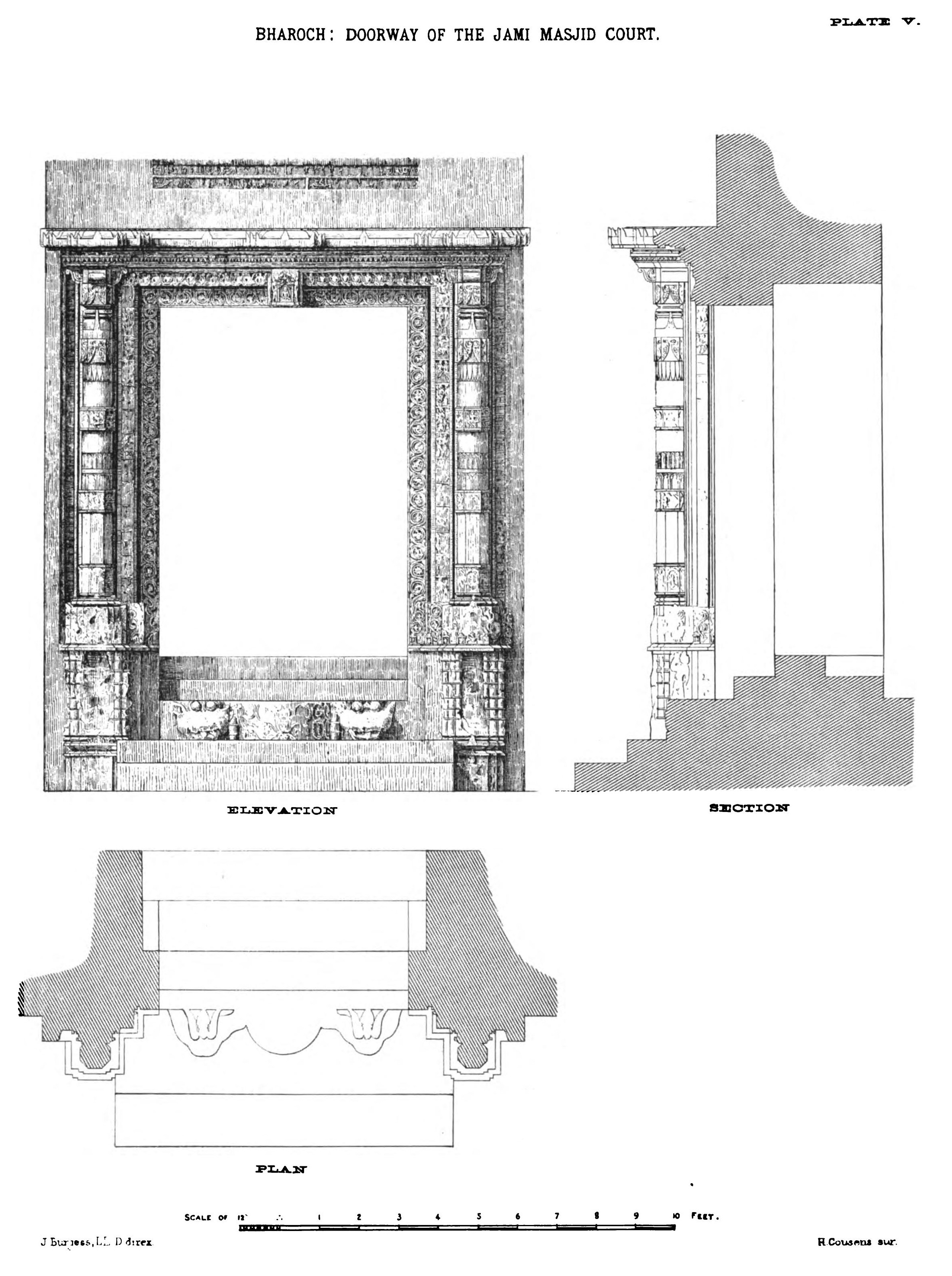
Marble door to the courtyard, originally from a Jain temple with a Jina image still visible in the upper frame.

== See also ==
- Islam in India
- List of mosques in India
- List of Monuments of National Importance in Gujarat
