= Jami Mosque, Khambhat =

Mosque in Khambat, Gujarat, India

Jami Mosque
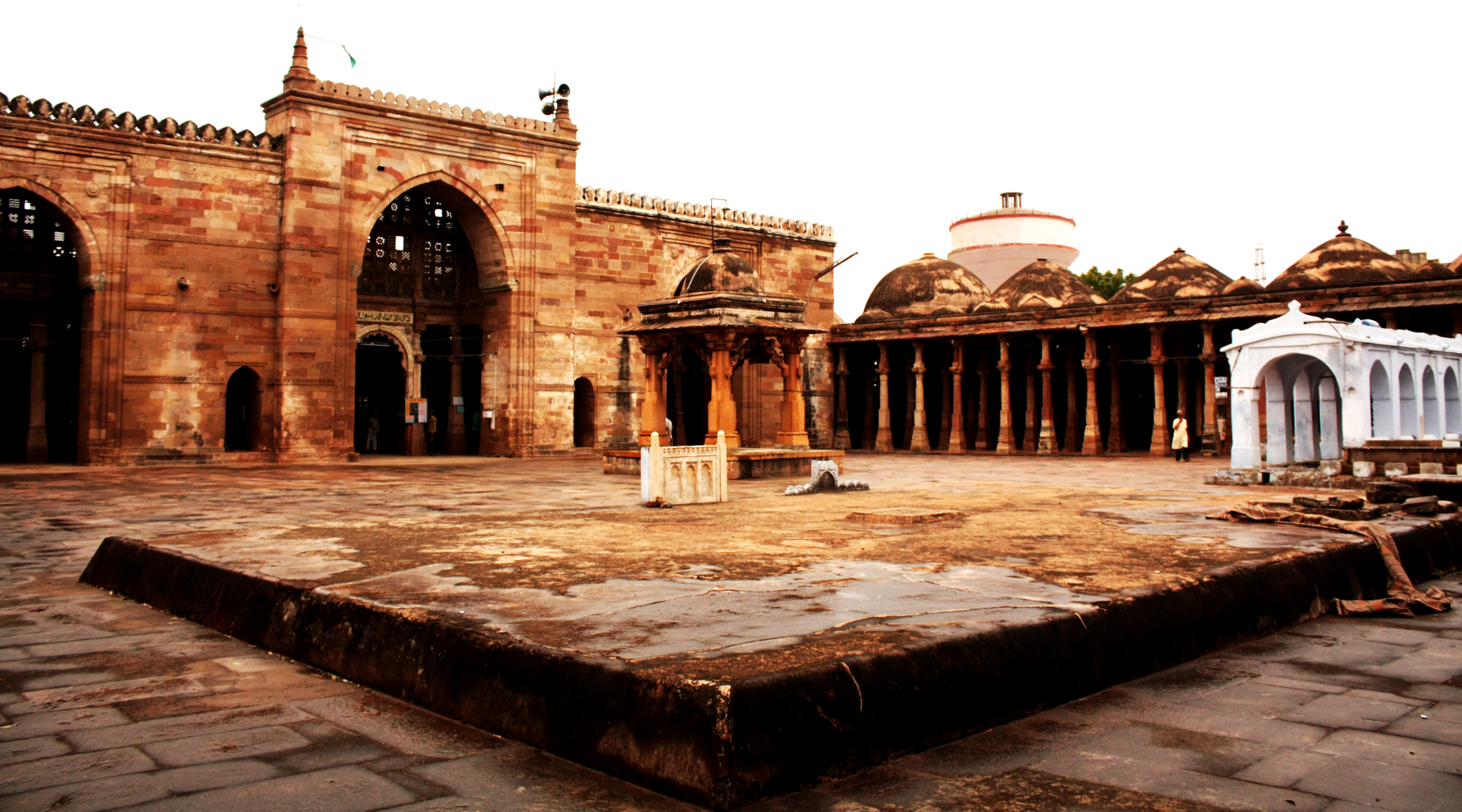
- The mosque from the central courtyard, in 2011

- Location of the mosque in Gujarat

Religion
- Affiliation: Islam
- Ecclesiastical or organisational status: Mosque
- Status: Active

Location
- Location: Khambhat, Gujarat
- Coordinates: 22°18′37″N 72°37′05″E

Architecture
- Architect: Umar bin Ahmad al-Kazaruni
- Type: Mosque architecture
- Style: Indo-Islamic
- Completed: 4 January 1325

Specifications
- Dome: Many
- Materials: Stone, bricks, mortar

Monument of National Importance
- Official name: Jami Mosque, Khambhat
- Reference no.: N-GJ-70

The Jami Mosque is a Friday mosque in Khambat, in the state of Gujarat, India. Built in 1325, it is one of the oldest Islamic monuments in Gujarat. The mosque's interior is an open courtyard built with 100 columns.

The mosque is a Monument of National Importance.

== Location ==
The mosque is located in Khambat or Cambay, which was a prosperous mercantile port town during the 7th to the 18th century. It is at the estuary of the Mahi River, and is 100 kilometres (62 mi) from Ahmedabad and 78 kilometres (48 mi) from Vadodara.

== History ==
Alauddin Khalji (1296–1315) conquered Gujarat and captured Khambat in 1324. During his conquest in Gujarat, he built a magnificent mosque. According to an inscription on the mosque, it was built in 1325. Umar bin Ahmad al-Kazaruni, a businessman of the town, is credited with building the mosque. This structure is a congregational mosque which marks the start of Islamic architecture in Gujarat and is distinct in style.

== Architecture ==
The mosque's architecture marks the evolution of the Indo-Islamic architecture. Its architectural features do not display any minarets but toranas are seen in the central arches of the mosque which represent architecture of the Gujarat Sultanate.

The interior part of the mosque has a colonnaded open courtyard which is built with 100 columns supporting roofs built from the ruins of Hindu and Jain temples. The prayer hall has many compartments topped by low domes, which are unique and are different from those which crown the mihrab's niches. The domes are provided with latticed windows made in the architectural style of Gujarat. The columns are set in two rows with each row consisting of 26 columns forming a passage that separates the wall in the front from the first row. In addition, there are eight rows formed by six pillars in each row, which are next to the facade; these result in the formation of 14 chambers and each chamber is topped by a dome. There are arcaded entrances to the aisle of the mosque which are provided with a flat roof. In the middle portion of the mosque which hides the domes of the roof, there are jambs which rise to a height of about 40 feet (12 m) and these are topped by sharp finials.

In the southern part of the mosque there is a colonnaded hall in a square shape but with a circular inner court where the tomb of Umar bin Ahmad al-Kazaruni, who died in 1333, is located. It is built of marble. In addition, there are many smaller tombs of the 14th and 15th centuries. There are also remnants of a fort built by the Mughal Emperor Akbar in the 16th century. There are many engravings on various parts of this tomb structure such as the first twelve and a half verses of the Surah XXXVI, Surah II, v. 256 – the Throne-verse," the conclusion of verse 151 of Surah II, Surah XXXVI, v. 52, Surah III, vv. 16 and 17 and Surah vv. 163–165. On the western part of the tomb is the Epitaph which has an inscription of Surah XXXVI, vv. 65–71.

== Gallery ==
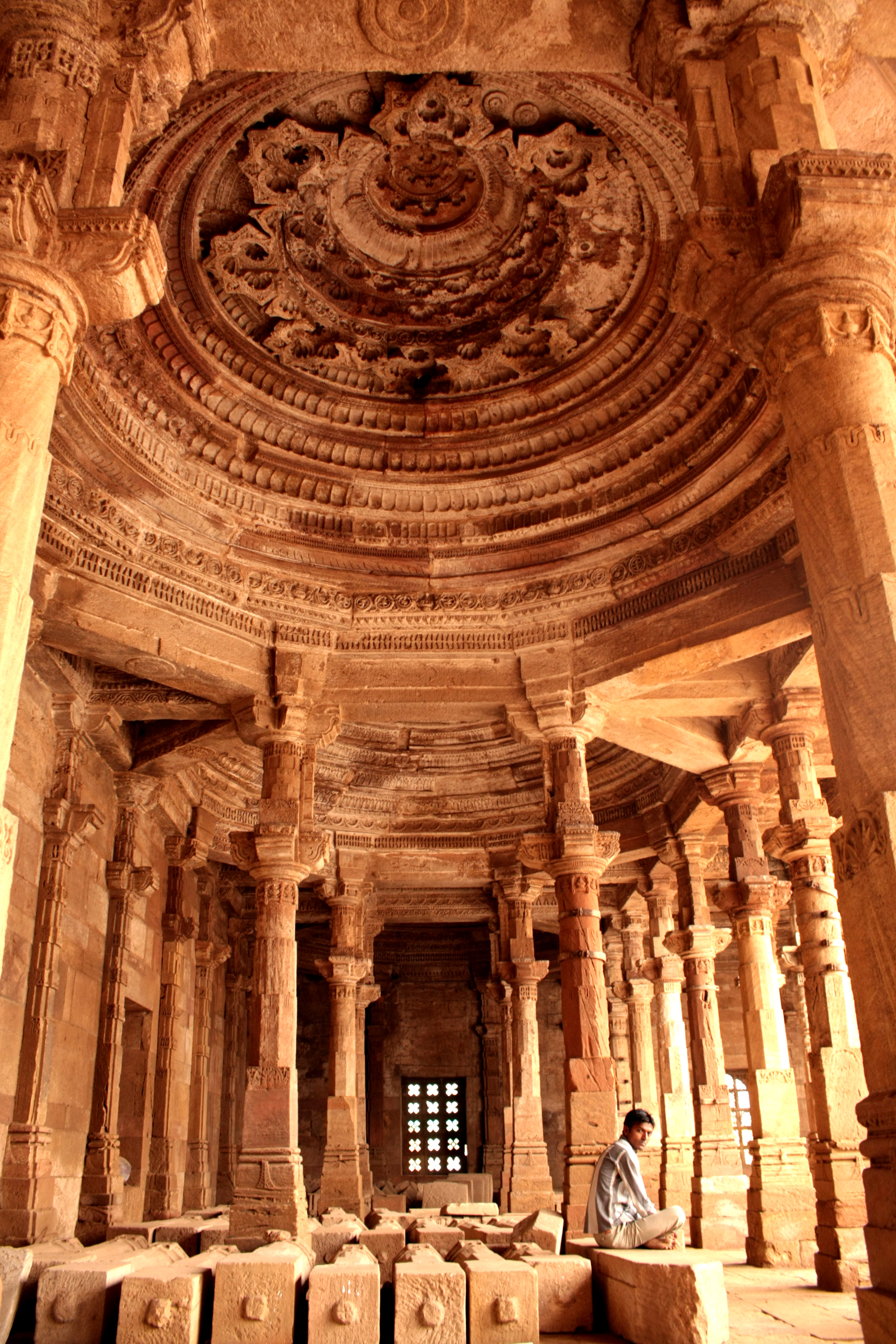
Entrance corridor area of the mosque from the eastern wall

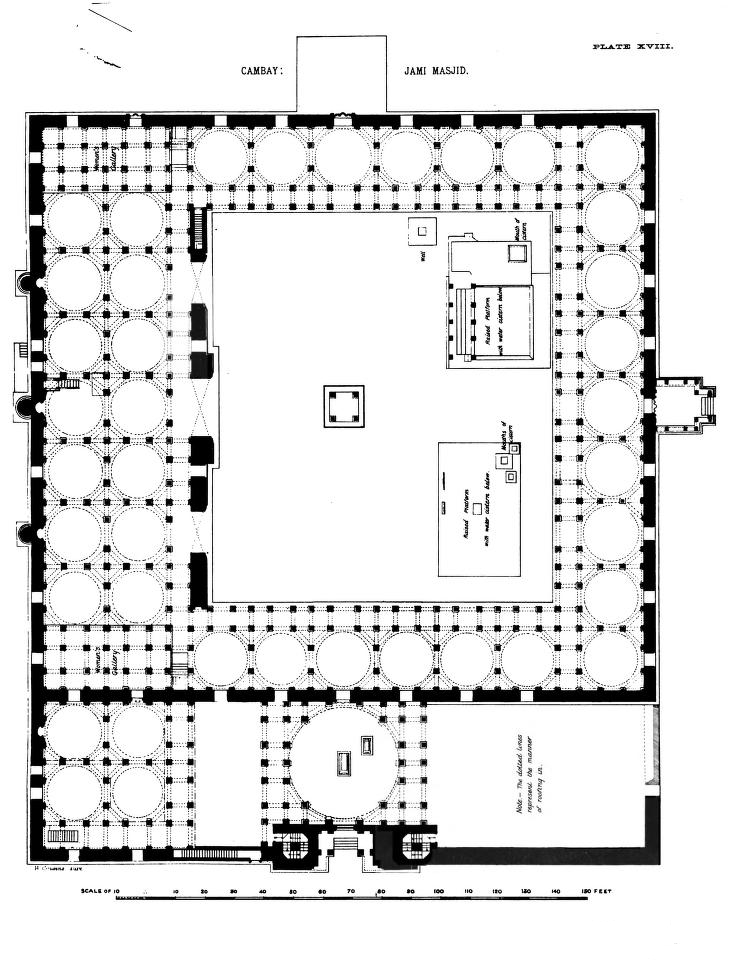
Building plan

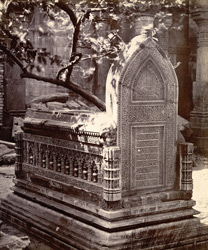
The tomb of Omar bin Ahmad Al Kazaruni in the mosque

== See also ==
- Islam in India
- List of mosques in India
- List of Monuments of National Importance in Gujarat
