= Gorthiya Mahadev Temple =

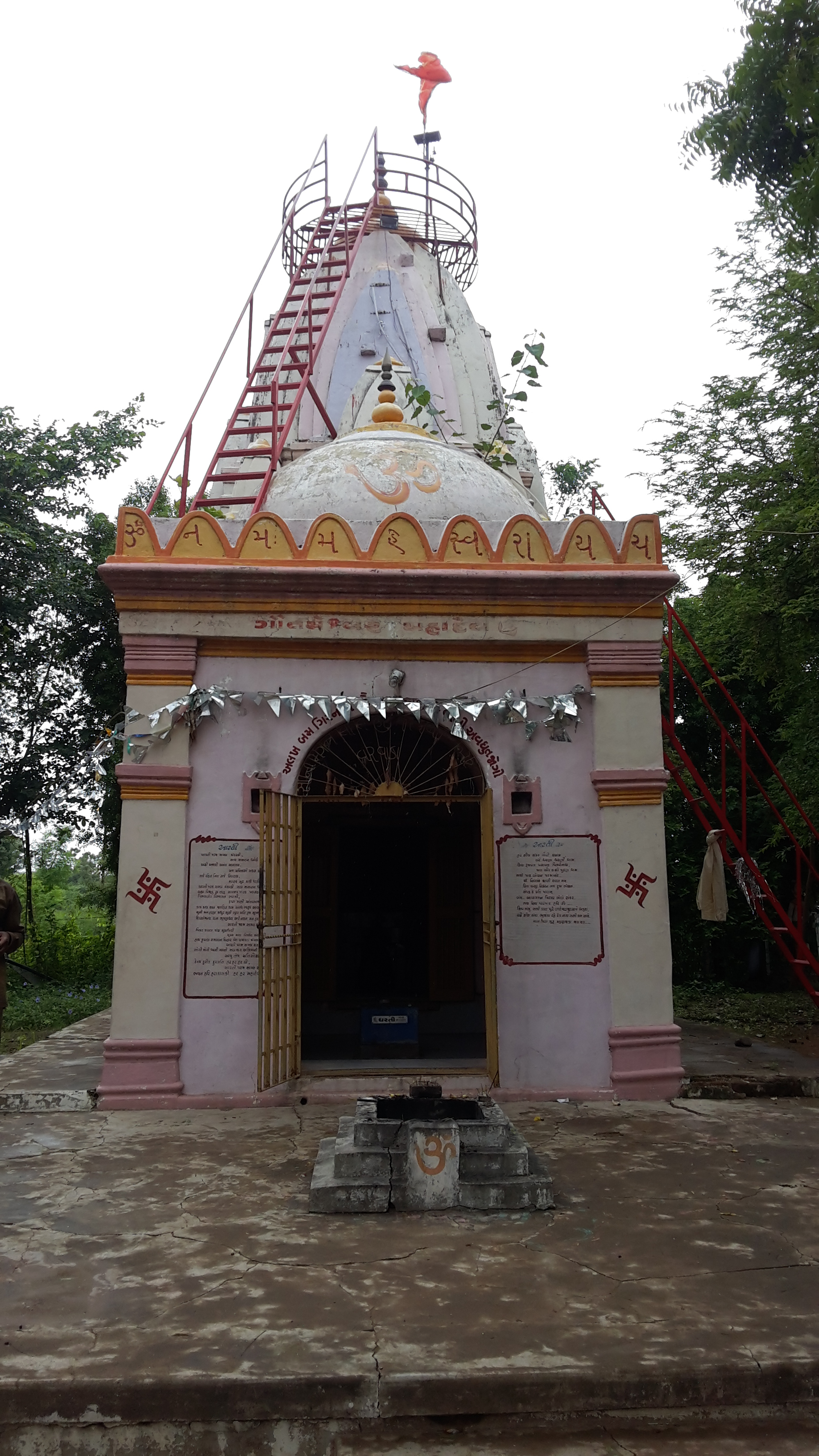
- Mahadev Temple

- Location in Gujarat

Religion
- Affiliation: Hinduism
- District: Sabarkantha
- Festivals: Mahashivaratri, Guru Purnima

Location
- Location: Takar
- State: Gujarat
- Country: India
- Coordinates: 23°56′2″N 73°02′57.5″E

Architecture
- Type: Mandir architecture
- Creator: Unknown
- Completed: Before 18th Century

Gorthiya Mahadev Temple (Gujarati : ગોરઠીયા મહાદેવ મંદિર) is a Hindu Temple dedicated to Lord Shiva, located in the town of Takaar, about 8 km from Ranasan in Prantij in Gujarat state in India.

== Fairs ==
Fairs are held here every year on the event of Shivaratri, Guru Purnima , Maha Bij & Aatham which are attended by thousands of people.

== Big events ==
Maha Shivaratri and Guru Purnima are the two big events of the year and thousands of people attending it.
