= Jami Masjid, Mangrol =

Mosque in Mangrol, Gujarat, India

Jami Masjid
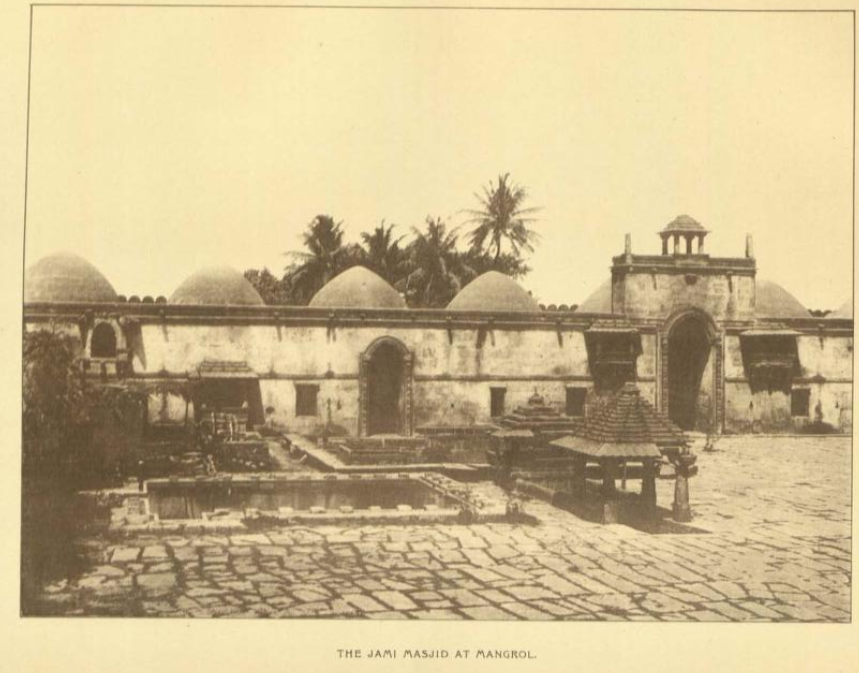
- The former mosque exterior, in 1931

- Location of the former mosque in Gujarat

Religion
- Affiliation: Islam (former)
- Ecclesiastical or organizational status: Mosque (former)
- Status: Abandoned (partial ruinous state)

Location
- Location: Mangrol, Gujarat
- Country: India
- Interactive map of Jami Masjid
- Coordinates: 21°07′10″N 70°06′37″E

Architecture
- Completed: c. 1384
- Dome: Six (maybe more)

Monument of National Importance
- Official name: Jami Masjid
- Reference no.: N-GJ-138

The Jami Masjid is a former Friday mosque, now in partial ruins, located in Mangrol, in the state of Gujarat, India. It was built in c. 1384, during the reign of the Gujarat Sultanate. The mosque is a Monument of National Importance.

There are nine mihrabs in the back wall of the mosque, and the mosque structure includes an extensive subterranean vav.

== Gallery ==
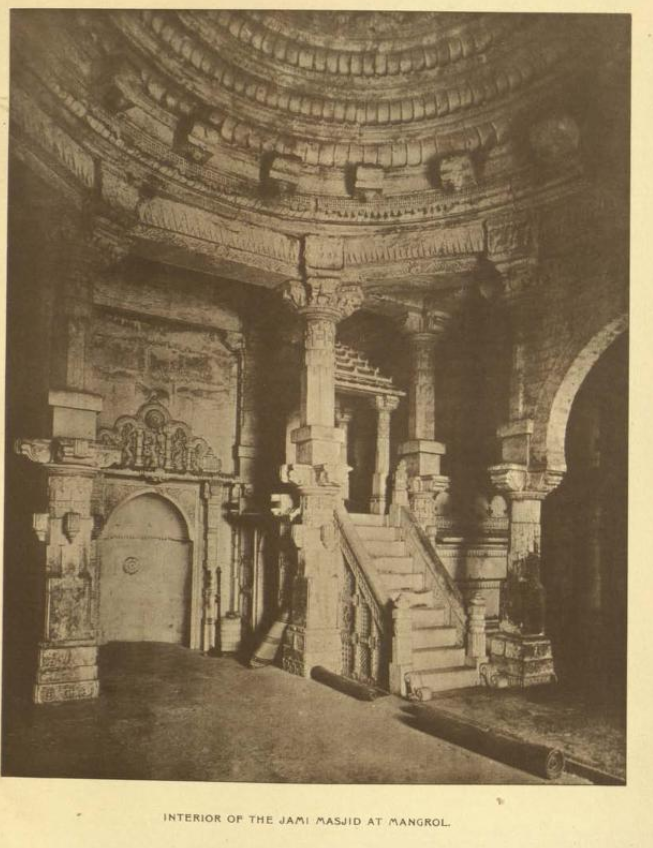
Interior of the mosque

== See also ==
- Islam in India
- List of mosques in India
- List of Monuments of National Importance in Gujarat
