= Dhank Caves =

Caves in Gujarat, India

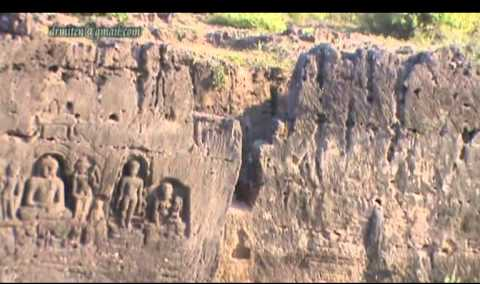
- Jain Carving at Dhank Caves

- Location within India Location within Gujarat
- Coordinates: 21.781547°N 70.12423°E

The Dhank Caves are located near Dhank village near Upleta, Rajkot district, Gujarat, India. They were chiseled out of a calcareous sandstone outcropping during the regime of the Western Satraps. The caves are influenced by Buddhist and Jain cultures. The Jain cave includes figures of Adinath, Shantinath and Pārśva. These are considered to be the earliest Jain sculptures in Kathiawad.

== Details of Jain Carvings ==
This caves were carved in the seventh century A.D. and have a plain style of carving.

This is one of the earliest rock cut cave of Gujarat. This place is also known as Dhankgiri and about 48 km of Junagadh in north west direction. on western side of the hill there are three niches. One niche is facing the door and another two are situated on either side of it.

The door facing niche contains some Jain Images in kayotsarga and meditation posture. Most of Savior sculpture do not contain a clear cognizance or symbol of Tirthankara but according to H. D. Sanklia this image represents Rishabhnatha. On either side of Jina two whisk bearers are depicted and Jina is sitting on a lion throne or Simhasan. There are two another mediation posture images of Tirthankara saviors containing two whisk bearers on either side with serenity and tranquility on face. Triple canopies were depicted over the head of Jina. One of these images are depicted with Deer cognizance attributed to 16th Lord Shantinatha.

One well preserved image of 23rd TIrthankara Parshvanatha is depicted in kayotsarga posture with long limbs parallel to body and cobra hood canopied. An image of Jaina yakshi ambika is also carved here who contains an infant in her arm and another with mango bud. from the ongoing discussion it is clearly evident that Dhank caves are attributed to Jainism and dwellers of these caves were Jain. Burgess did not say anything about the date of the Dhank caves but according to scholar H.D. Sanklia these caves could be hailed from third century AD after examining the Jaina sculpture's Style and Iconography. This cave is attributed to Shwetamber Jain.

== Cultural Significance ==
Dhank Caves represent a rare convergence of Buddhist and Jain traditions at a single rock‑cut complex. The presence of both Buddhist and Jain imagery illustrates the shared sacred landscape of medieval Saurashtra, where religious communities often adapted natural rock shelters for devotional use. As the earliest Jain sculptures in Kathiawad, they are critical to understanding the spread of Jaina iconography west of the Girnar hills. The site is protected as a centrally listed monument under the Archaeological Survey of India (ASI), Rajkot Circle.
