= Borsad Stepwell =

Coordinates: 22.4111°N 72.9005°E

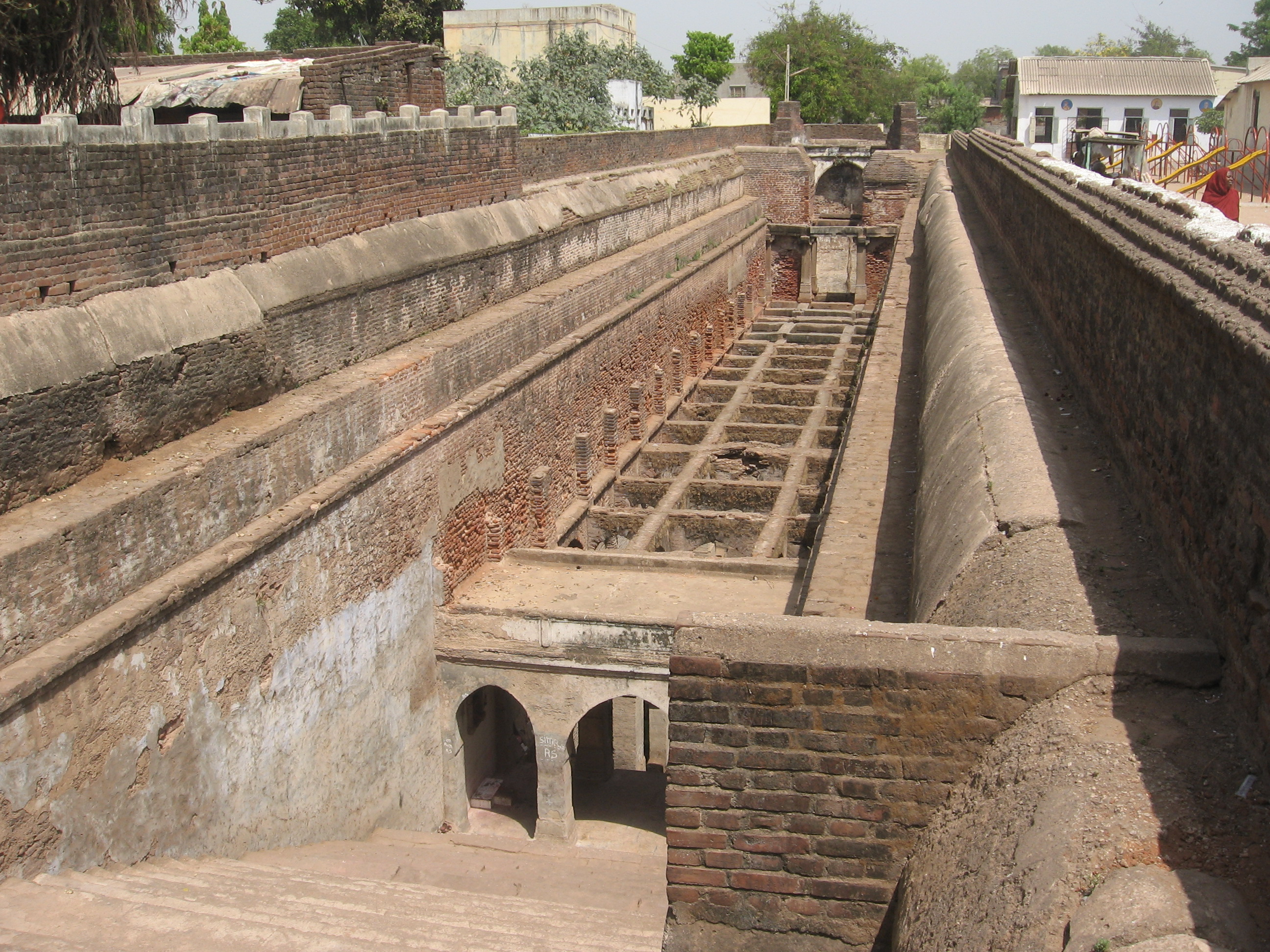
Borsad Stepwell

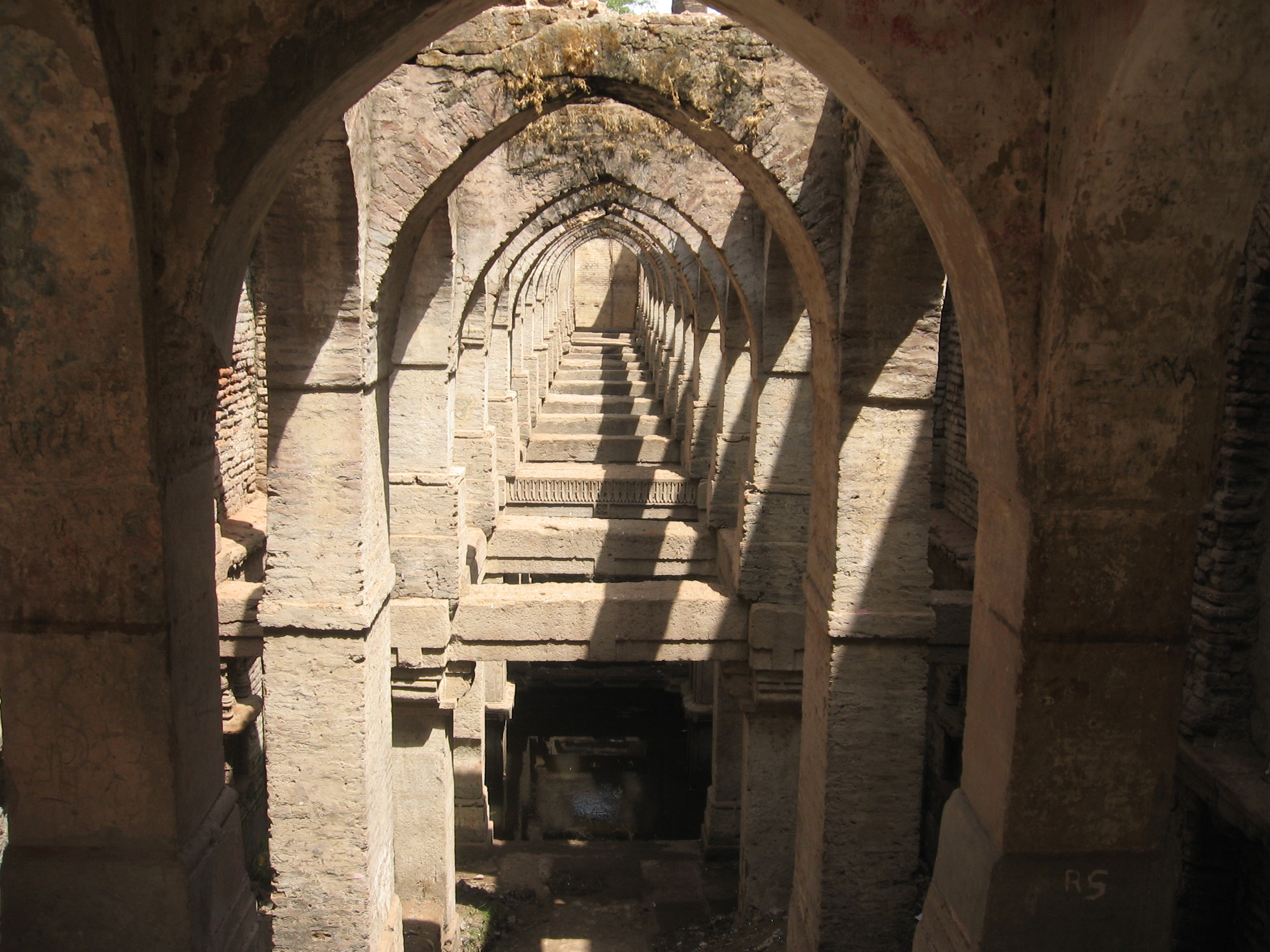
From inside

The ancient stepwell is located in Borsad town in Anand district, Gujarat, India. It was built in 1497 by Vasu Soma and his family. It is seven story stepwell and has 13 arches. The water is reached by flight of steps. It is Monument of National Importance (N-GJ-69) protected by Archeological Survey of India.

== Inscription ==
There is an inscription in Sanskrit in the stepwell. It has date of Samvat 1553 dated Shraavana Vad 13th.

In the Samvat Year 1553 on the 13th day of dark half of Shravana month, the day of week Sunday, on this day here, Vasasoma, the resident of Stambhatirtha, Lalata by race, his son Vasa Khet, his son Vasa Parbat, his son Vasa Shripal.
His son Vasa Soma, his son Vasah Dharamshi, his son Vasa Narasyanga, his son vasa Shrirang, his brothers Roop and Shripal.
Vasa Soma, his son Vasa Manik, his son Vasa Vika, his son Vasa Sagar, his son Vasa Saira. Architect Varade. Ga. Narbad.
