= Tomb of Sikandar Shah, Prantij =

Tomb of Sikandar Shah
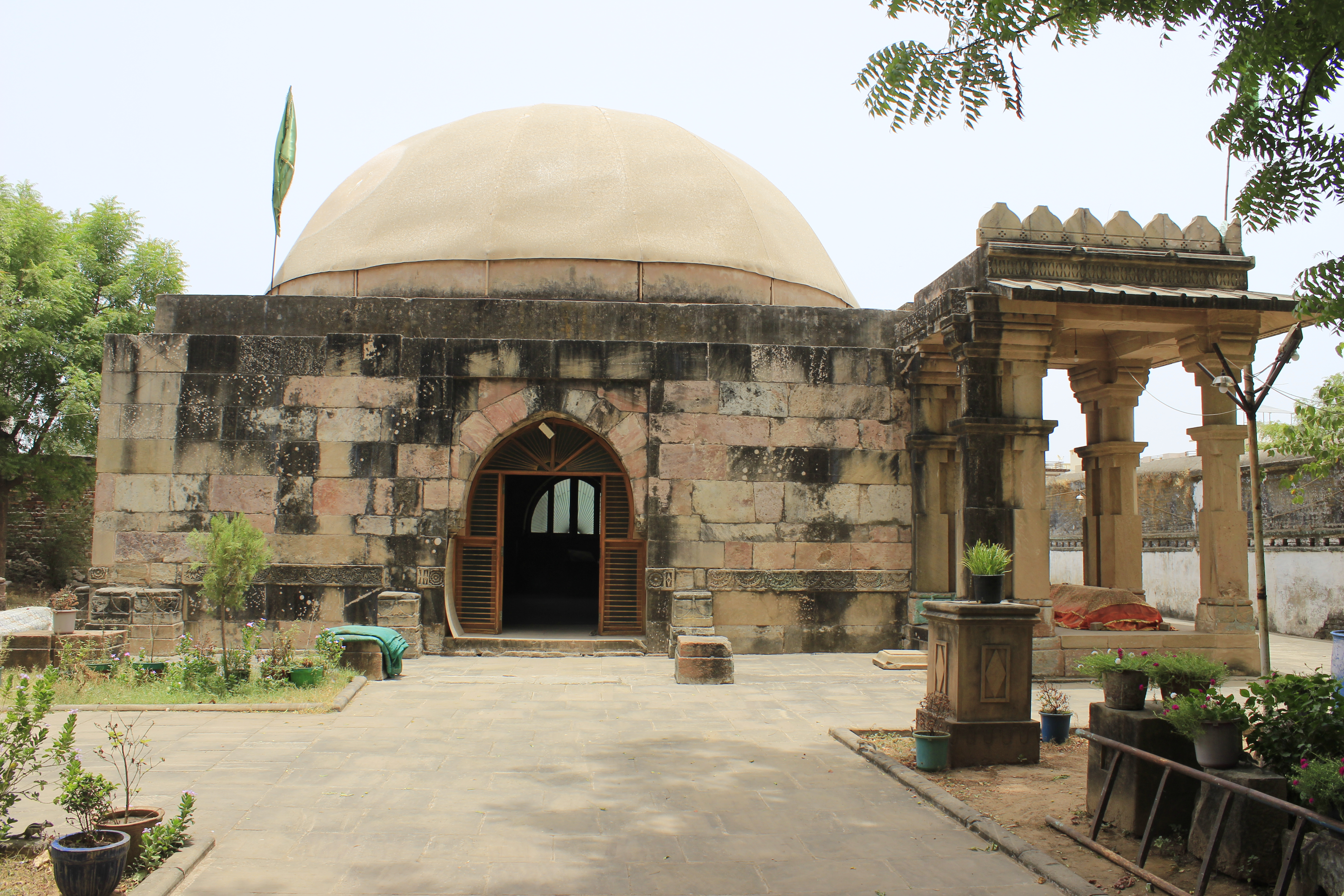
- Tomb of Sikandar Shah
- 23.4356°N 72.8578°E
- Location: Prantij, Gujarat, India
- Type: Mausoleum
- Material: Sandstone
- Completion date: c. 1480
- Dedicated to: Sikandar Shah
- Designation: Monument of National Importance (N-GJ-175)

The tomb of Sikandar Shah, also known as Sikandar Shah's Rauza, is a mausoleum built by Gujarat Sultan Mahmud Begada in honour of his soldier Sikandar Shah in c. 1480 at Prantij, Gujarat, India.

== History ==
The epitaph reads that "the greatest Rai and the magnificent Khan" Sikandar Khan, son of Giyath, son of Umar, son Muhammad, son of Soomra chief Duda was killed on 21st Safar Hijri year 885 (10 May 1480) at Thana (outpost) Sinher or Sembhar at the age of 32 during the reign of Mahmud Shah I (Mahmud Begada).

According to a legend, Mian Sikandar was a soldier in an army of Ahmad Shah I. He died in a battle at Halvad with the chief of Dhrangadhra State. As he was native of Prantij, he was buried here. Later his name was sanctified from Mian to Shah.

The tomb is the Monument of National Importance (N-GJ-175).

== Architecture ==
The mausoleum is a rectangular building without a dome which has been replaced with fibre-reinforced plastic dome during the later restoration.
