= Gohilwad Timbo =

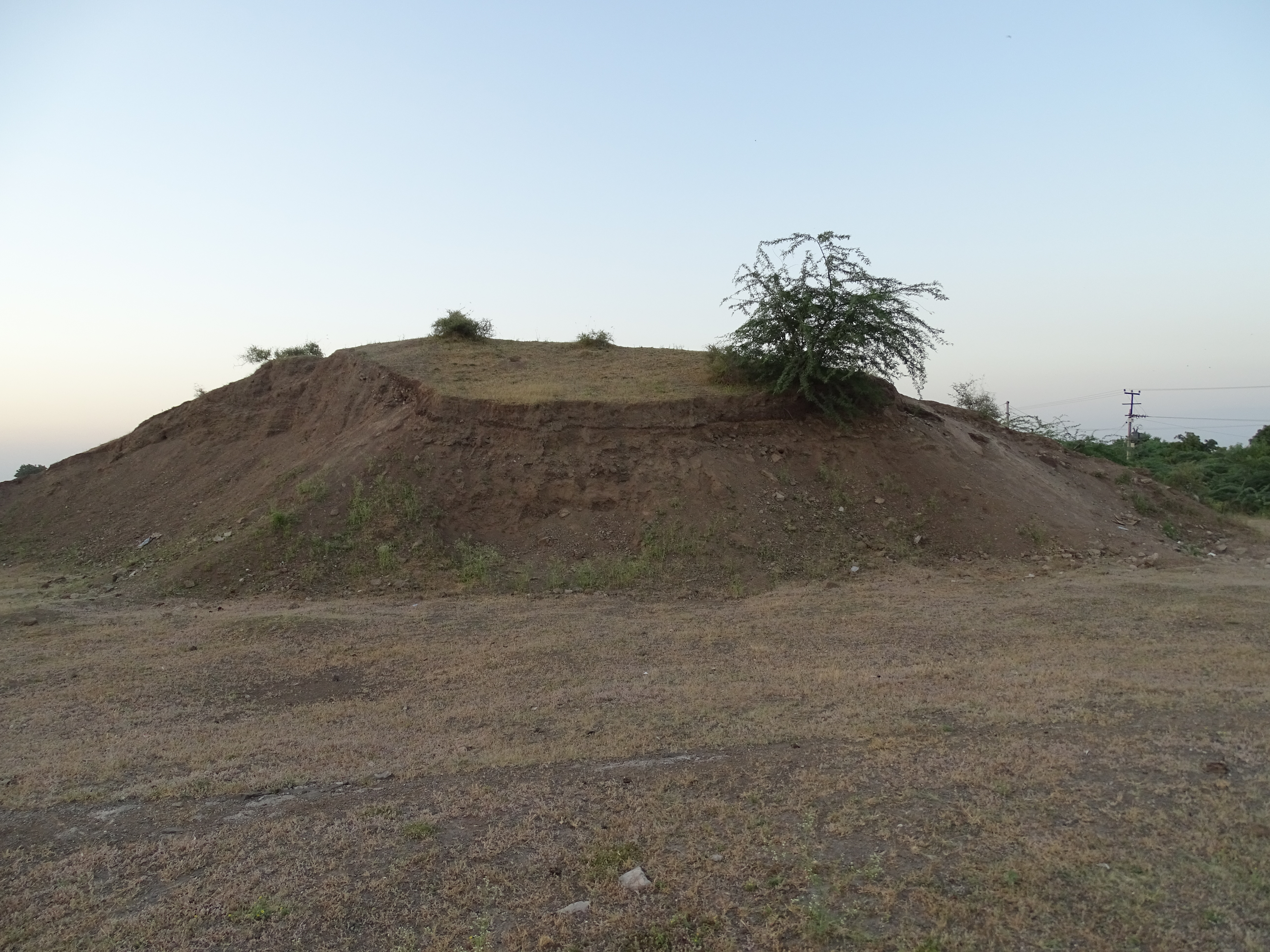
- Gohilwad Timbo

- Location within Gujarat

General information
- Location: Near Amreli, Gujarat, India
- Coordinates: 21°36′13.4136″N 71°12′19.1988″E

Design and construction
- Designations: ASI Monument of National Importance (N-GJ-66)

The Gohilwad Timbo is a mound and ancient site of Kshatrapa-Gupta period located near Amreli in Amreli Taluka, Amreli district, Gujarat, India. The site is Monument of National Importance protected by Archeological Survey of India. It is located between Vadi and Thebi rivulets. The site is encroached now.

== Archeology ==
Archeological history

Gohilwad Timbo literally means the mound of Gohilwad. It is roughly triangular in plan rising from banks of Thebi and Vadi rivulets to height of 15 feet extending about a mile. The mound is divided in several smaller mounds by rain gullies. Three mounds labelled M, B and G were excavated before 1945 by Hiranand Sastri and Gadre. Later S. R. Rao carried out excavations in 1952–53.

Findings

The structural remains were found on the east and west sides of the mound. the possible furnace of goldsmith and clay mould was found on north-west side of it. Terracotta images of Hindu as well as Buddhist origin were found. Carved and plain pottery, Black Grey Ware pottery, remains of burial in graves and urns, beads, coins, carved bangles of conch shells were also recovered. Basements of rooms chiefly built in rubble masonry or undressed stones, brick walls and other relics were also found. A tomb measuring 12 inches by 17 inches by 2 3/4 inches was found. Some coins of Western Satraps and possibly of Andhra coins of Gautamiputra Satkarni were found. A hoard of more than two thousand coins of Kumaragupta I (5th century) was also unearthed. A terracotta die with legend Shri-Siladitya engraved in the Gupta script on it and the copper plate of Kharagraha I was also found.
