= Pārśvanātha =

23rd Tirthankara in Jainism

- 23rd Tirthankara
- Idol of Pārśvanātha at Jirawala Jain Tirth, Jirawala, Sirohi, Rajasthan
- Other names: Pārśva, Pārasanātha
- Venerated in: Jainism
- Predecessor: Neminatha
- Successor: Mahavira
- Symbol: Snake
- Height: 9 cubits (13.5 feet)
- Age: 100 years
- Tree: Ashok
- Color: Green

Genealogy
- Born: c. 872 BCE; Varanasi, Kingdom of Kashi (present-day Uttar Pradesh, India)
- Died: c. 772 BCE; Sammed Shikhar
- Parents: Aśvasena (father); Vāmādevī (mother)
- Spouse: Prabhāvatī, daughter of Kuśasthala’s Prasenajit (Shvetambara); Unmarried (Digambara)
- Dynasty: Ugravaṁśa—Ikṣvākuvaṁśa

Pārśvanātha (Sanskrit: पार्श्वनाथः), or Pārśva and Pārasanātha, was the 23rd of 24 tīrthaṅkaras ("Ford-Maker" or supreme preacher of Dharma) of Jainism. Pārśvanātha is the earliest Jain tīrthaṅkara who is acknowledged as a historical figure, with some teachings attributed to him that are accurately recorded, and a historical nucleus within the legendary accounts of his life from traditional hagiographies. According to Jain tradition, he lived between the 9th to 8th century BCE, whereas historians consider him to have lived between c. the 8th to 7th century BCE, founding a proto-Jain ascetic community (Note: The traditional Jaina perspective regards Jainism as eternal dharma without a founder, whereas history of religion scholars seek to consider Jainism in historical context as a Śramaṇa movement emerging and gradually evolving during the late Vedic Period and during the Second Urbanisation of the Mahajanapada period (Dundas 2002, pp. 12–13, Long 2009, p. 30). Founder of Jainism: Dundas (2002, pp. 30–31): "Pārśva [...] founded a community of ascetics and lay people".; Kuiper (2010, p. 144): "Parshvanatha [...] founded a community based upon the abandonment of worldly concerns".; von Glasenapp (1999, p. 24): "Nothing [...] comes in the way of the supposition that Jainism was established by Pārśva"; Proto-Jaina tradition: Basham (1951, pp. 108–109): "Jainism [...] was but a development of the older proto-Jainism of Pārśva", with "a looser group of ascetics", "clothed proto-Jainas".; Long (2020, p. 206): "Jainism [...] is traced, in its current form, to Mahāvīra [...], although [...] there is some evidence that Mahāvīra's teaching is a continuation of an earlier, proto-Jain tradition".; Moore (1977, p. 137): "[Mahavira's] predecessor Parshvanatha may have been an historical proto-Jain leader about 200 years earlier".; Dundas (2002, p. 32): "It is impossible to be certain about the relationship between Mahāvīra and Pārśva and in actuality the chronological distance between the two teachers. [...] [E]arly Jainism coalesced out of an interaction between the cosmological ideas of Pārśva and a more rigorous form of orthopraxy advocated by Mahāvīra") that subsequently got revived and reformed by Mahāvīra (6th to 5th century BCE).

According to traditional Jain narratives, he was born to King Aśvasena and Queen Vāmādevī of the Ikshvaku dynasty in the Indian city of Varanasi, 273 years before Mahāvīra, placing him between the 9th and 8th century BCE. Renouncing worldly life, he founded an ascetic community. He was the spiritual successor of the 22nd tīrthaṅkara Neminatha, and is popularly seen as a supreme propagator and reviver of Jainism. Pārśvanātha is said to have attained moksha on Mount Sammeda (Madhuban, Jharkhand), now popular as Parasnath Hill in the Ganges basin, an important Jain pilgrimage site. His iconography is notable for the serpent hood over his head, and his worship often includes Dharaṇendra and Padmāvatī (Jainism's serpent Devtā and Devī).

Texts of the two major Jain sects differ on the teachings of Pārśvanātha and Mahāvīra. The Digambaras believe that there was no difference between the teachings of Pārśvanātha and Mahāvīra. According to the Śvētāmbaras, Mahāvīra expanded Pārśvanātha's first four restraints with his ideas on ahimsa (lit. 'non-violence') and added the fifth monastic vow (celibacy). Pārśvanātha did not require celibacy and allowed monks to wear simple outer garments.

== Historical Pārśvanātha ==
=== Historicity ===
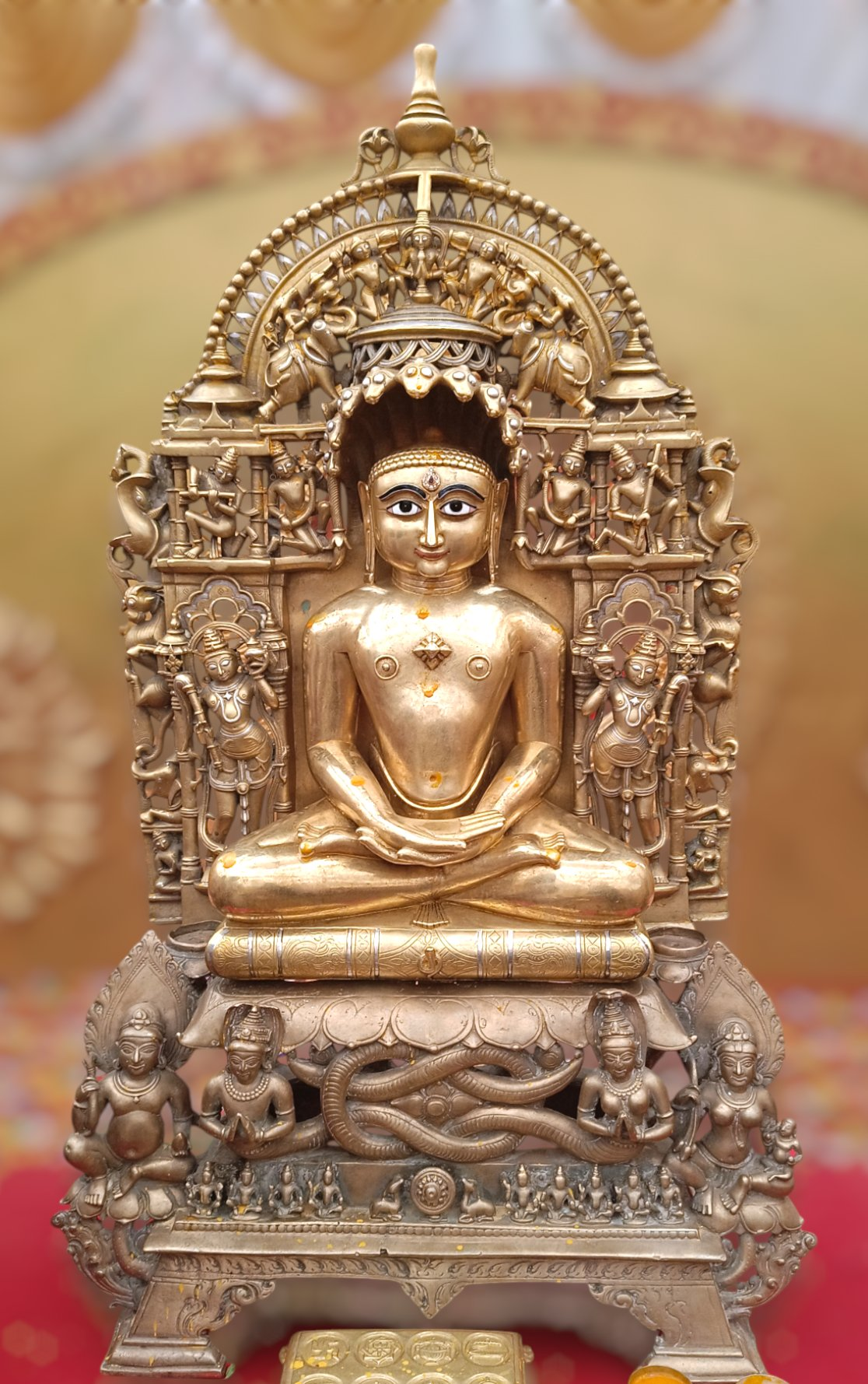
A 10th-century CE idol of Pārśvanātha from Patan, Gujarat

Pārśvanātha is the earliest Jaina tīrthaṅkara who is acknowledged by scholars as a likely historical figure. Historians consider that he may have lived between c. 8th to 6th century BCE, founding a proto-Jain ascetic community which was subsequently revived and reformed by Mahāvīra (6th or 5th century BCE).

According to some scholars, Jainism's origin as a distinctive system can be traced to him, although possibly drawing upon earlier existing doctrines. According to Paul Dundas, Jain texts such as section 31 of the Isibhasiyam (a description of his teachings, which may be historical) provide circumstantial evidence that he lived in ancient India. Historians such as Hermann Jacobi have accepted him as a historical figure because his Caturyāma Dharma (Four Vows) are mentioned in Buddhist texts. In the Manorathapurani, a Buddhist commentary on the Anguttara Nikaya, Vappa, the Buddha's uncle, was a follower of Pārśvanātha.The Buddhist book Manorathapurani, mentions the names of many lay men and women as followers of the Parsvanatha tradition and among them is the name of Vappa, the uncle of Gautama Buddha. In fact it is mentioned in the Buddhist literature that Gautama Buddha himself practiced penance according to the Jaina way (probably Parsvanath ascetism) before he propounded his new religion.

There may be a "historical nucleus" within the traditional accounts of his life, although these hagiographic writings are otherwise considered later, legendary, and not historically reliable. (Note: Having compiled the traditional accounts about Pārśvanātha, states Glasenapp, it is the historian's approach "to try to obtain an approximate idea of his life and his teachings from the scanty material which stands the test of a critical examination", but there remain many uncertainties. Zimmer considers him to be a historical figure, but "in the biography of Pārśva the element of legend is so strong that one can scarcely sense an actually living, breathing human being," in contrast to better documented era of Mahāvīra. Comparing Jaina legends of Pārśva to similar "parallel stories" in Buddhist legends, Thomas concludes, "It appears as if the legends grew side by side and mutually influenced the rival hagiographers" of Jainism and Buddhism. According to Glasenapp, it cannot be known for certain how much the "colourful circle of legends [...] correspond to the historical facts": he accepts "the main tenets of Pārśva's doctrine", and that the "holy legend" probably does "conceal a historical nucleus", with an essential "correctness of tradition" that Pārśva had been "of noble birth", a "young man from a wealthy family" who renounced the worldly life and riches to become a wandering ascetic, dedicated "completely to the attainment and proclamation of philosophical knowledge"—although many details of his life were "excessively embellished by his followers later".) The earliest biographical description of his life is from a chapter of the Kalpa Sūtra (traditionally ascribed to sage Bhadrabāhu during 4th-3rd century BCE, but most likely dating from 3rd-2nd century BCE): it is "extremely short in extent and probably modelled on that of Mahāvīra", so as it is of a formulaic and hagiographic nature, "its value as a historical document is somewhat doubtful".

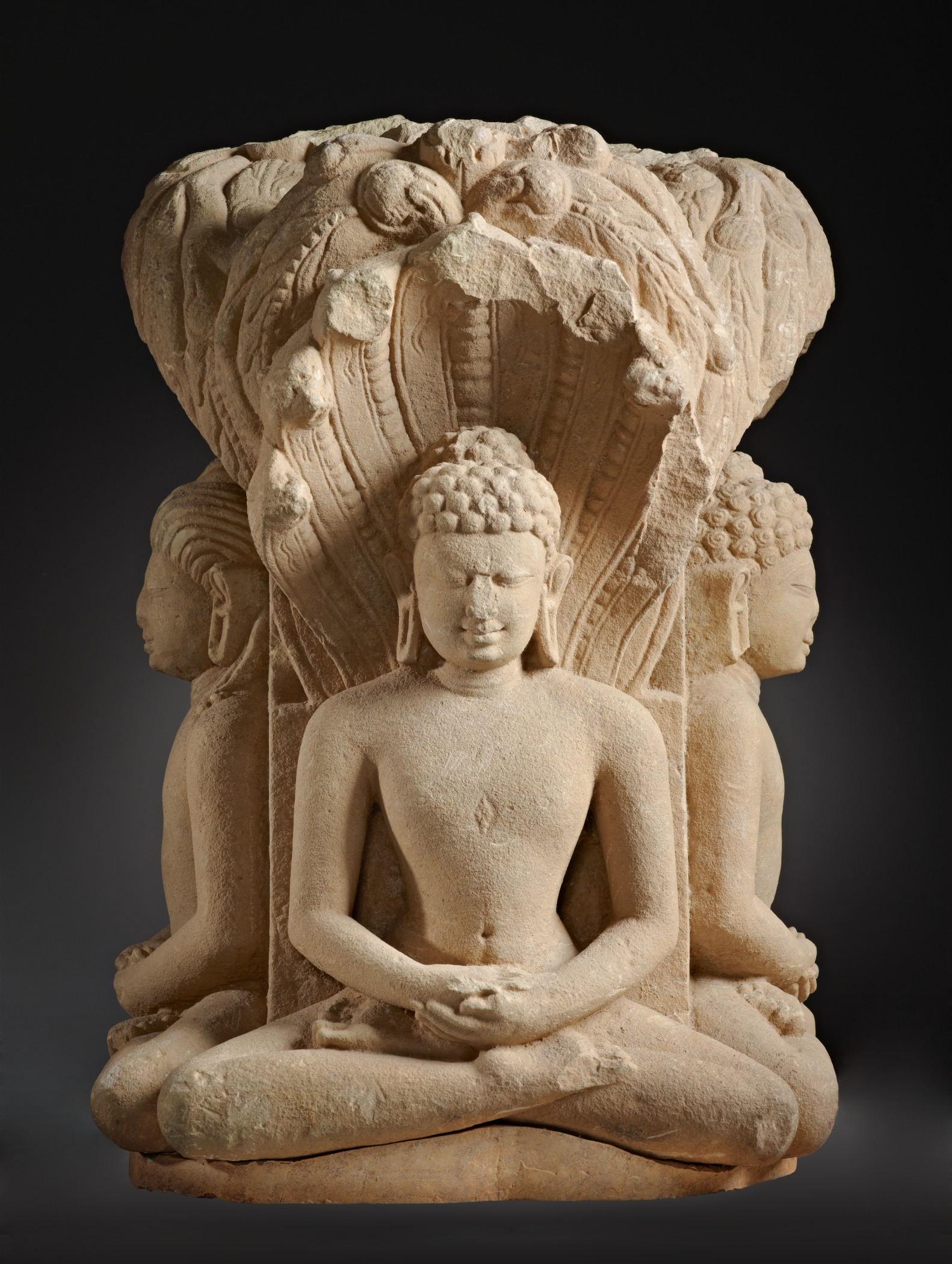
Parshvanatha led the shramana order in 9th century BCE

However, some other scholars are more skeptical in their considerations. According to Gough, "the historicity of Pārśva is not, however, firmly established". Gough additionally notes that the stories about Pārśva are rather reflective of the much later historical context when they were written: according to Gough, "since early Jaina biographical accounts of the tīrthaṅkaras were composed in north India around the turn of the first millennium", "there is no evidence that he lived in Varanasi", which more likely reflects the city's status as "an important commercial center of north India in the early centuries of the Common Era", i.e., "the time periods when monks composed and developed these stories." However other historian already rejected this theory like Kuiper who clearly states that "The first Jain figure for whom there is reasonable historical evidence is Parshvanatha (or Parshva), a renunciant teacher who have lived in the 8th-7th century BC and founded a community based upon the abandonment of worldly concerns. Jain tradition regards him as the 23rd Tirthankara (literally, "Ford-maker," i.e., one who leads the way across the stream of rebirths to salvation) of the current age (kalpa)".

Doubts about Pārśvanātha's historicity are also supported by the oldest Jaina texts, which present Mahāvīra with sporadic mentions of ancient ascetics and teachers without specific names (such as sections 1.4.1 and 1.6.3 of the Acaranga Sutra). The earliest layer of Jaina literature on cosmology and universal history pivots around two jinas: the Adinatha (Rishabhanatha) and Mahāvīra. Stories of Pārśvanātha and Neminatha appear in later Jaina texts, with the Kalpa Sūtra the first known text. However, these texts present the tīrthaṅkaras with unusual, non-human physical dimensions; the characters lack individuality or depth, and the brief descriptions of the tīrthaṅkaras are largely modelled on Mahāvīra. The Kalpa Sūtra is the most ancient known Jaina text with the 24 tirthankar, but it lists 20; three, including Pārśvanātha, have brief descriptions compared with Mahāvīra.

=== Archaeology and inscriptions ===
Early archaeological finds, such as the statues and reliefs near Mathura, lack iconography such as lions and serpents. Two of the early bronze images of Pārśvanātha can be found on Chhatrapati Shivaji Maharaj Vastu Sangrahalaya and Patna Museum dating back to the second century BCE to the first century CE. A first century BCE Ayagapata is in State Museum Lucknow containing the image of Pārśvanātha. A seventh century CE statue was found in the Asthal Bohar village of Rohtak, Haryana. Kankali tila image of headless Parsvanatha is dated from 100 BCE to 75 BCE.

=== Relation with Mahāvīra ===
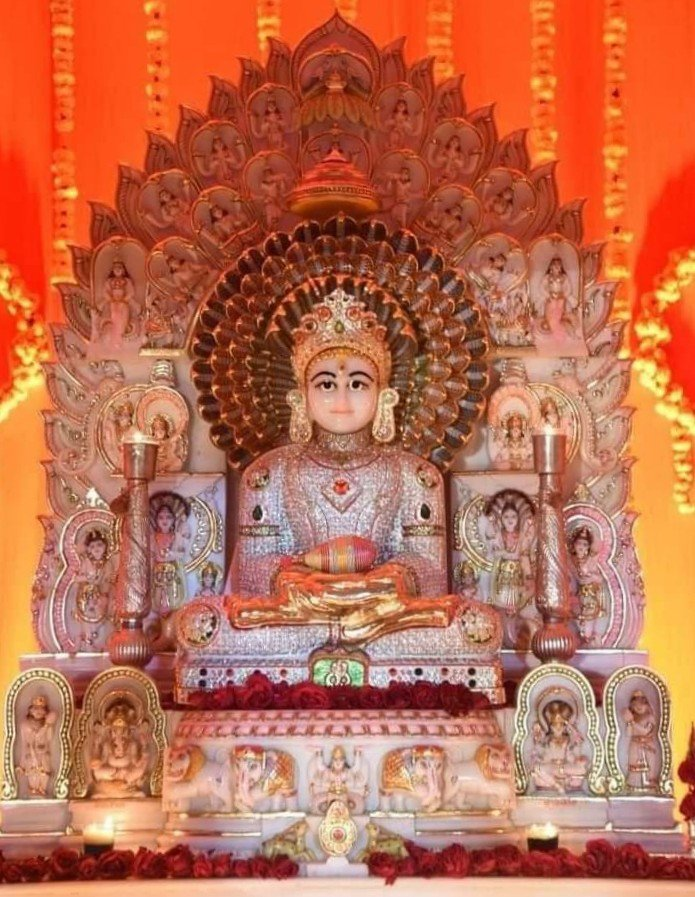
23rd Jain Tirthankar, Parshwanatha re-organized the shraman sangha in 9th century BCE

Pārśvanātha's biography with Jaina texts says that he preceded Mahāvīra by 273 years and that he lived 100 years. Mahāvīra is dated to c. 599 – c. 527 BCE in the Jaina tradition, and Pārśvanātha is dated to c. 872 – c. 772 BCE. According to Dundas, historians outside the Jaina tradition date Mahāvīra as contemporaneous with the Buddha in the 5th century BCE which, based on the 273-year gap, would date Pārśvanātha to the 8th or 7th century BCE.

Section 2.15 of the Ācārāṅga Sūtra says that Mahāvīra's parents (Triśalā and Siddhārtha) were lay devotees of Pārśvanātha, which "has led to the widespread scholarly conclusion that Mahāvīra must have renounced within Pārśva's ascetic lineage." Despite the generally accepted historicity of Pārśva, some historical claims such as the link between him and Mahāvīra, whether Mahāvīra renounced in the ascetic tradition of Pārśvanātha, and other biographical details have led to different scholarly conclusions. Dundas further states, "It is impossible to be certain about the relationship between Mahāvīra and Pārśva and in actuality the chronological distance between the two teachers may have been much less than two and a half centuries."

Long points out "some scholars have suggested that Pārśvanātha and Mahāvīra were actually closer in time than the tradition claims", referring to studies by Madhusudan Dhaky—who has identified certain Jaina texts containing wording which implies that not so many years had elapsed between the two, leading Dhaky to suggest "Pārśva could not have started his ascetic career before the beginning of the sixth century BC" and "may have passed away only a few decades before Vardhamāna [i.e., Mahāvīra] had started his preaching career". In Jaina tradition, Pārśva is said to have visited some cities which, according to archaeological and historical evidence, first came to prominence during India's Second Urbanisation period, in the 7th–6th century BCE.

== Jaina biography ==
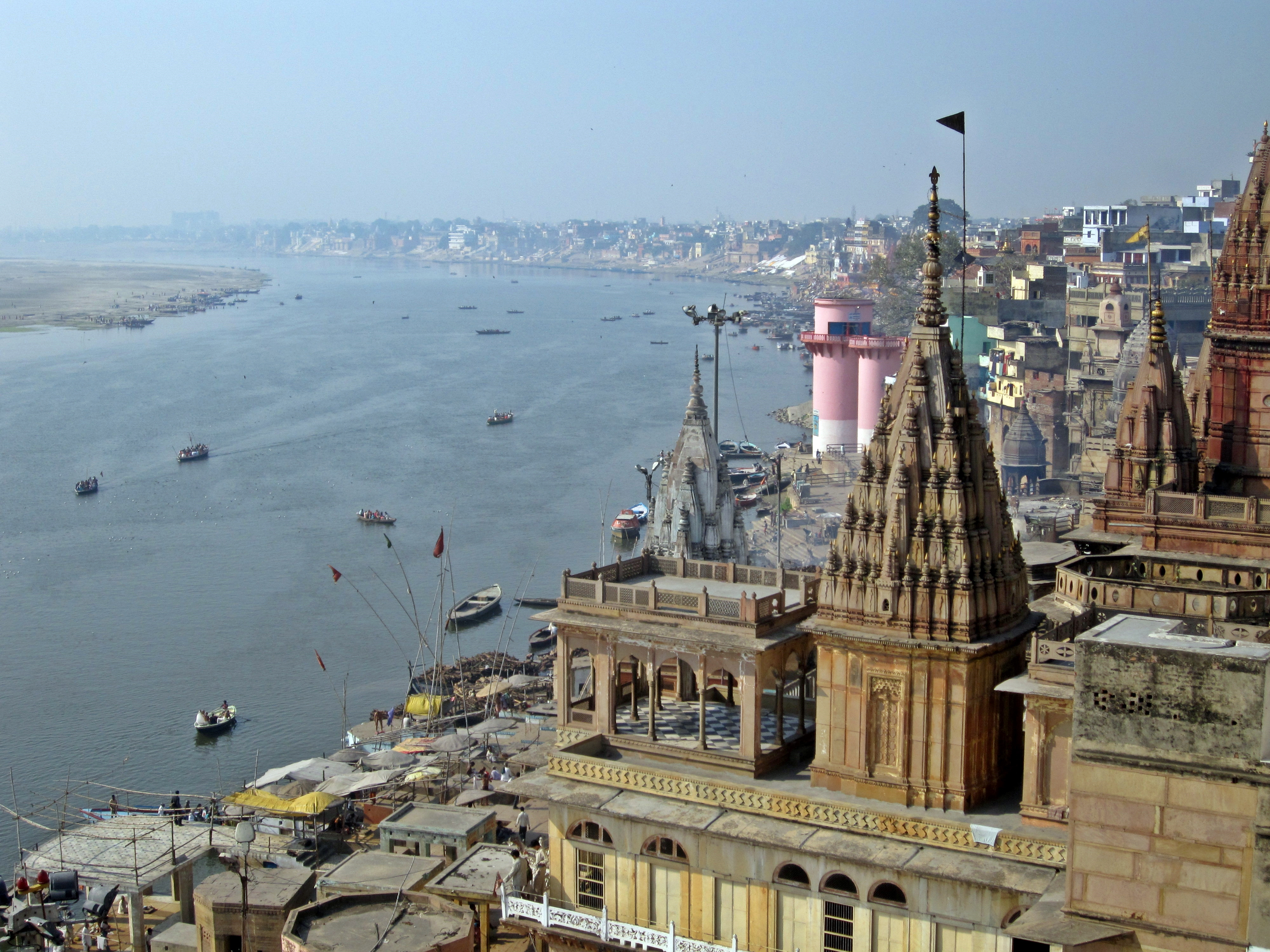
Pārśvanātha was born in Varanasi, a historic city on the Ganges.

Pārśvanātha was the 23rd of 24 tīrthaṅkaras in Jaina tradition.

=== Life before renunciation ===
He was born on the tenth day of the dark half of the Hindu month of Pausha to King Ashwasena and Queen Vamadevi of Varanasi. He is said to have been born 84,000 years after his predecessor, Neminatha. His height is mentioned as 9 hastas. Pārśvanātha belonged to the Ikshvaku dynasty. Before his birth, Jaina texts state that he ruled as the god Indra in the 13th heaven of Jaina cosmology. While Pārśvanātha was in his mother's womb, gods performed the garbha-kalyana (enlivened the fetus). His mother dreamt 14 auspicious dreams, an indicator in Jaina tradition that a tirthankar was about to be born. According to the Jaina texts, the thrones of the Indras shook when he was born and the Indras came down to earth to celebrate his janma-kalyanaka (his auspicious birth).

Pārśvanātha was born with blue-black skin. A strong, handsome boy, he played with the gods of water, hills and trees. At the age of eight, Pārśvanātha began practising the twelve basic duties of the adult Jaina householder. (Note: According to Zimmer, the Tattvarthadhigama Sutra state the twelve householder vows to be: (1) do not kill any being, (2) do not lie, (3) do not use another's property without permission, (4) be chaste, (5) limit your possessions, (6) take a perpetual and daily vow to go only certain distances and take only certain directions, (7) avoid useless talk and action, (8) do not think sinful acts, (9) limit diet and enjoyments, (10) worship at fixed times in the morning, noon and evening, (11) fast on some days and (12) give charity by donating knowledge, money and such every day.) He lived as a prince and soldier in Varanasi. The temples in Bhelupur were built to commemorate place for three kalyanaka of Pārśvanātha.

According to the Digambara school, Pārśvanātha never married; Śvētāmbara texts say that he married Prabhavati, the daughter of Prasenajit (king of Kusasthala). Heinrich Zimmer translated a Jaina text that sixteen-year-old Pārśvanātha refused to marry when his father told him to do so; he began meditating instead because the "soul is its only friend".

=== Renunciation ===
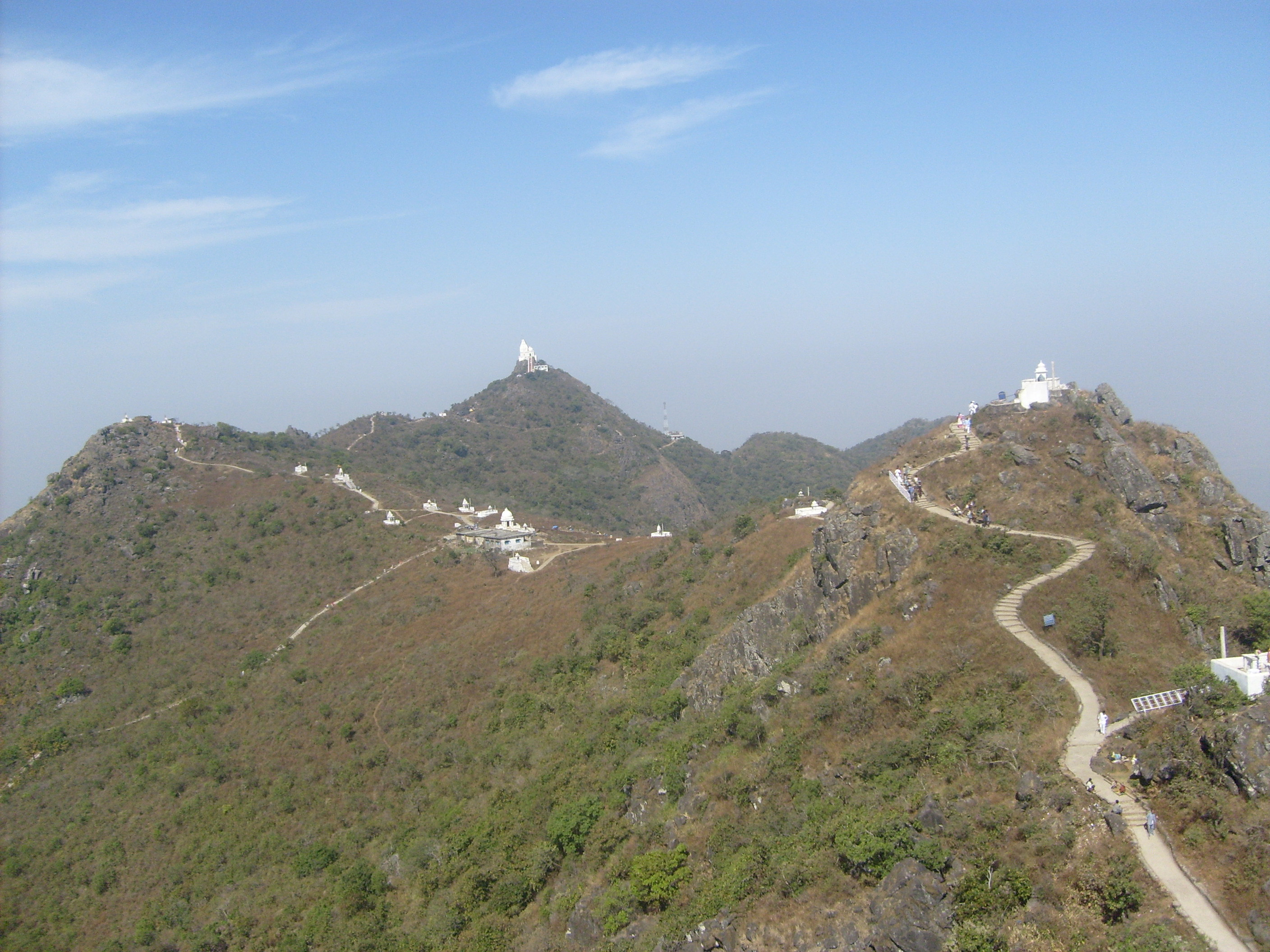
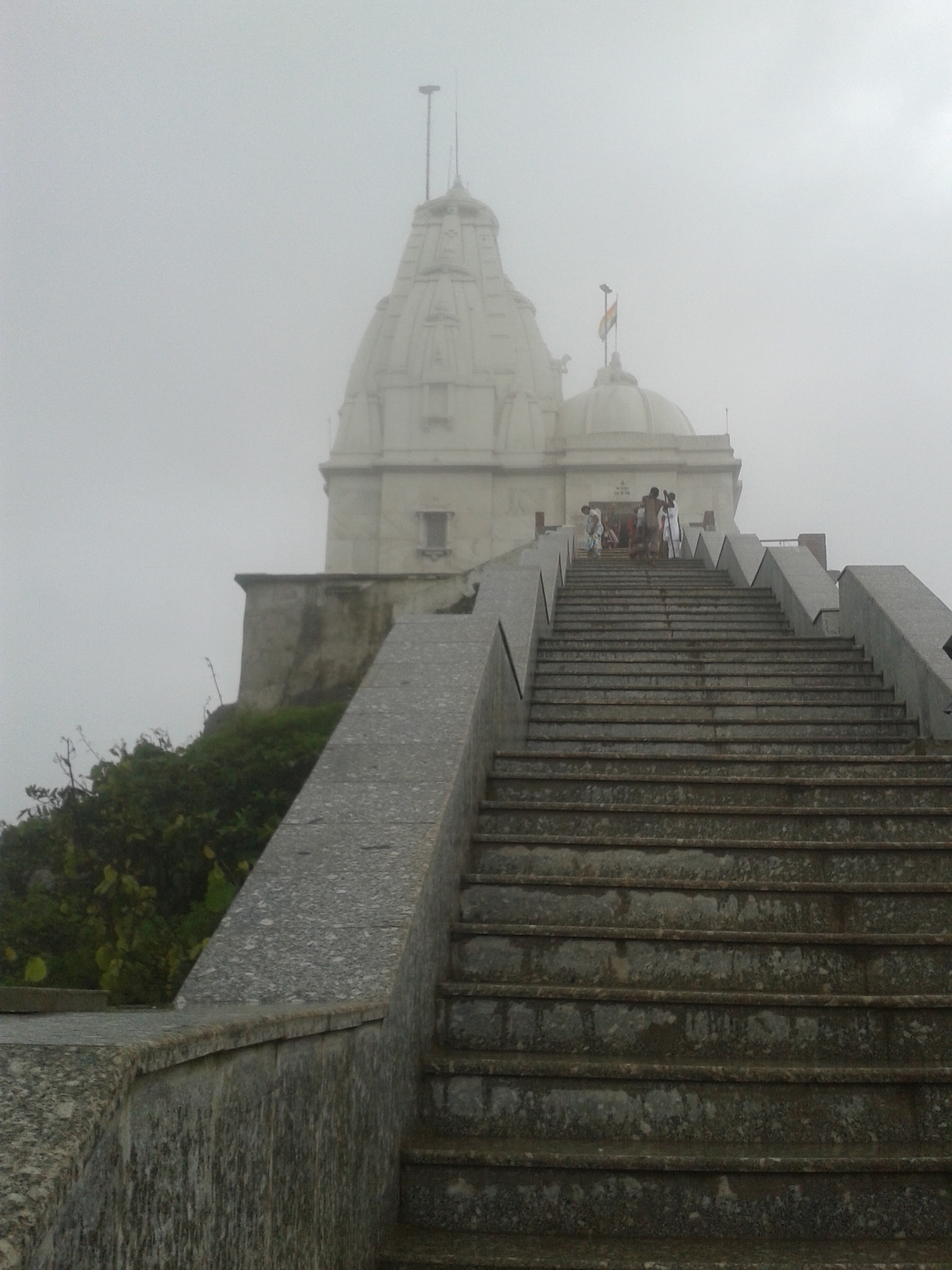
Parshvanatha achieved moksha (liberation of the soul) at Shikharji on Parasnath, the highest mountain in Jharkhand. A temple tonk is built at the place.

At age 30, on the 11th day of the moon's waxing in the month of Pausha (December–January), Pārśvanātha renounced the world to become a monk after seeing the image of his predecessor, Neminatha. He removed his clothes and hair and began fasting strictly. Pārśvanātha meditated for 84 days before he attained omniscience under a dhaataki tree near Benares. His meditation period included asceticism and strict vows. Pārśvanātha's practices included careful movement, measured speech, guarded desires, mental restraint and physical activity, essential in Jaina tradition to renounce the ego. According to the Jaina texts, lions and fawns played around him during his asceticism. (Note: Jain mythology describes a heavenly being attempting to distract (or harm) Parshvanatha, but the serpent god Dharanendra and the goddess Padmavati guard his journey to omniscience.)

Ahichchhatra is believed to be the place where Pārśvanātha attained Kevala Jnana (omniscience). According to Vividha Tirtha Kalpa, Kamath in an attempt to obstruct Pārśvanātha from achieving Kevala Jnana caused continuous rain. Pārśvanātha was immersed in water up to his neck and to protect him the serpent god Dharanendra held a canopy of thousand hoods over his head and the goddess Padmavati coiled herself around his body. Ahichchhatra Jaina temples are built to commemorate Pārśvanātha attaining Kēvalajñāna kalyāṇaka. On the 14th day of the moon's waning cycle in the month of Chaitra (March–April), Pārśvanātha attained omniscience. Heavenly beings built him a samavasarana (preaching hall), so he could share his knowledge with his followers.

After preaching for 70 years, Pārśvanath attained moksha at Shikharji on Parasnath hill (Note: Some texts call the place Mount Sammeta. It is revered in Jainism because 20 of its 24 tirthankars are believed to have attained moksha there.) at the age of 100 on Shravana Shukla Saptami according to Lunar Calendar. His moksha (liberation from the cycle of birth and death) in Jaina tradition is celebrated as Moksha Saptami. This day is celebrated on large scale at Parasnath tonk of the mountain, in northern Jharkhand, part of the Parasnath Range by offering Nirvana Laddu (Sugar balls) and reciting of Nirvana Kanda. Pārśvanātha has been called purisādāṇīya (beloved of the people) by Jains.

=== Previous lives ===
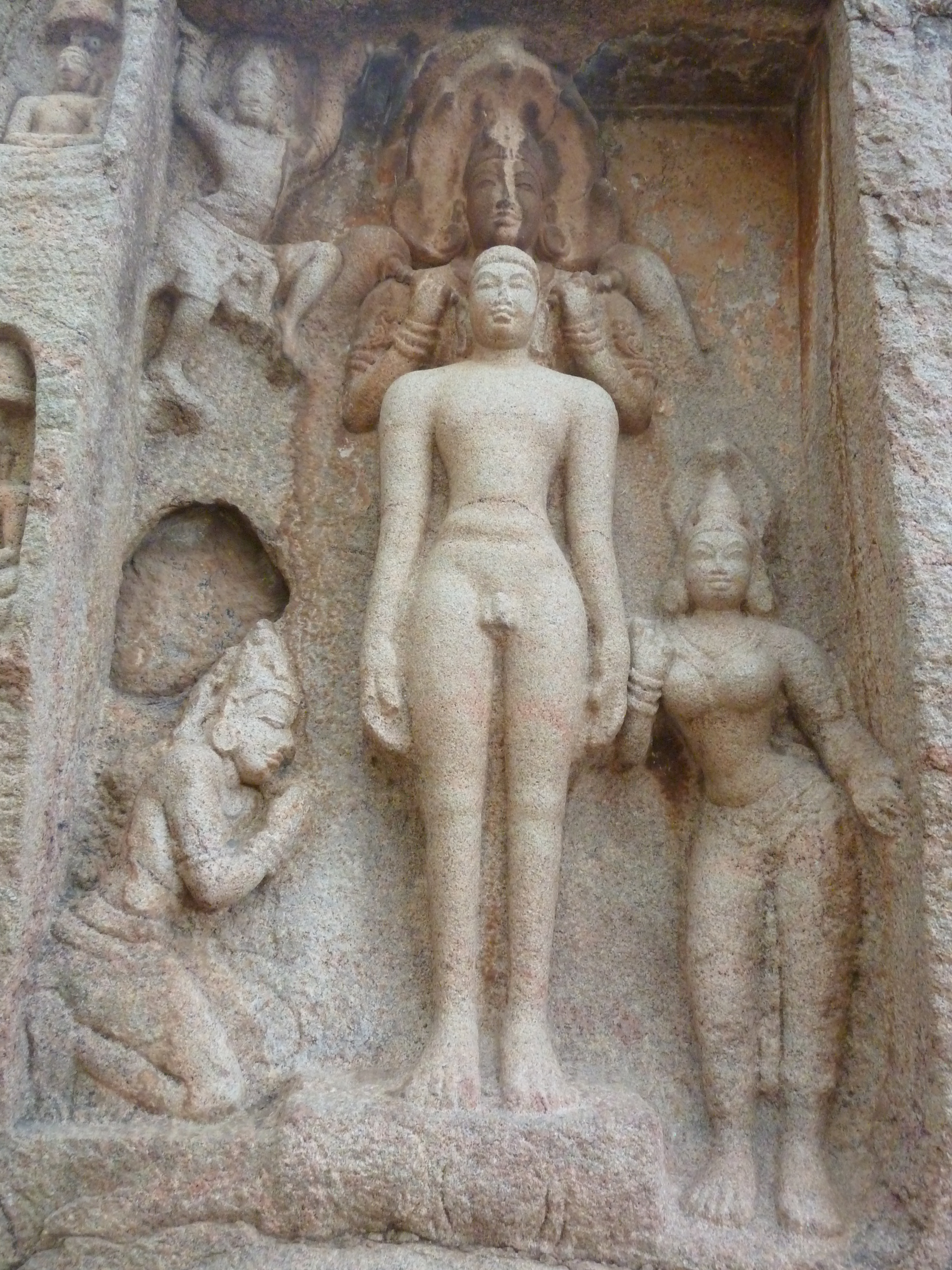
Pārśvanātha and his yaksha, Dharanendra, in the 8th-century Tamil Nadu Kalugumalai Jaina Beds

Jaina mythology contains legends about Pārśvanātha's human and animal rebirths and the maturing of his soul towards inner harmony like legends found in other Indian religions. (Note: The Jataka tales, for example, describe the Buddha's previous lives.) His rebirths include:

- Marubhuti – Vishwabhuti, King Aravinda's prime minister, had two sons; the elder one was Kamath and the younger one was Marubhuti (Pārśvanātha). Kamath committed adultery with Marubhuti's wife. The king learned about the adultery, and asked Marubhuti how his brother should be punished; Marubhuti suggested forgiveness. Kamath went into a forest, became an ascetic, and acquired demonic powers to take revenge. Marubhuti went to the forest to invite his brother back home, but Kamath killed Marubhuti by crushing him with a stone. Marubhuti was one of Pārśvanātha's earlier rebirths.
- Vajraghosha (Thunder), an elephant – He was then reborn as an elephant because of the "violence of the death and distressing thoughts he harbored at the time of his previous death". Vajraghosha lived in the forests of Vindyachal. Kamath was reborn as a serpent.

King Aravinda, after the death of his minister's son, renounced his throne and led an ascetic life. When an angry Vajraghosha approached Aravinda, the ascetic saw that the elephant was the reborn Marubhuti. Aravinda asked the elephant to give up "sinful acts, remove his demerits from the past, realize that injuring other beings is the greatest sin, and begin practicing the vows". The elephant realized his error, became calm, and bowed at Aravinda's feet. When Vajraghosha went to a river one day to drink, the serpent Kamath bit him. He died peacefully this time, however, without distressing thoughts.

- Sasiprabha – Vajraghosha was reborn as Sashiprabha (Lord of the Moon) (Note: Also known as Chandraprabha, he also appears in Buddhist and Hindu mythology and is the eighth of twenty-four entities in Jain cosmology.) in the twelfth heaven, surrounded by abundant pleasures. Sashiprabha, however, did not let the pleasures distract him and continued his ascetic life.
- Agnivega – Sashiprabha died, and was reborn as Prince Agnivega ("strength of fire"). After he became king, he met a sage who told him about the impermanence of all things and the significance of a spiritual life. Agnivega realized the importance of religious pursuits, and his worldly life lost its charms. He renounced it to lead an ascetic life, joining the sage's monastic community. Agnivega meditated in the Himalayas, reducing his attachment to the outside world. He was bitten by a snake (the reborn Kamath), but the poison did not disturb his inner peace and he calmly accepted his death.

Agnivega was reborn as a god with a life of "twenty-two oceans of years", and the serpent went to the sixth hell. The soul of Marubhuti-Vajraghosa-Sasiprabha-Agnivega was reborn as Pārśvanātha. He saved serpents from torture and death during that life; the serpent god Dharanendra and the goddess Padmavati protected him, and are part of Pārśvanath's iconography.

=== Disciples ===
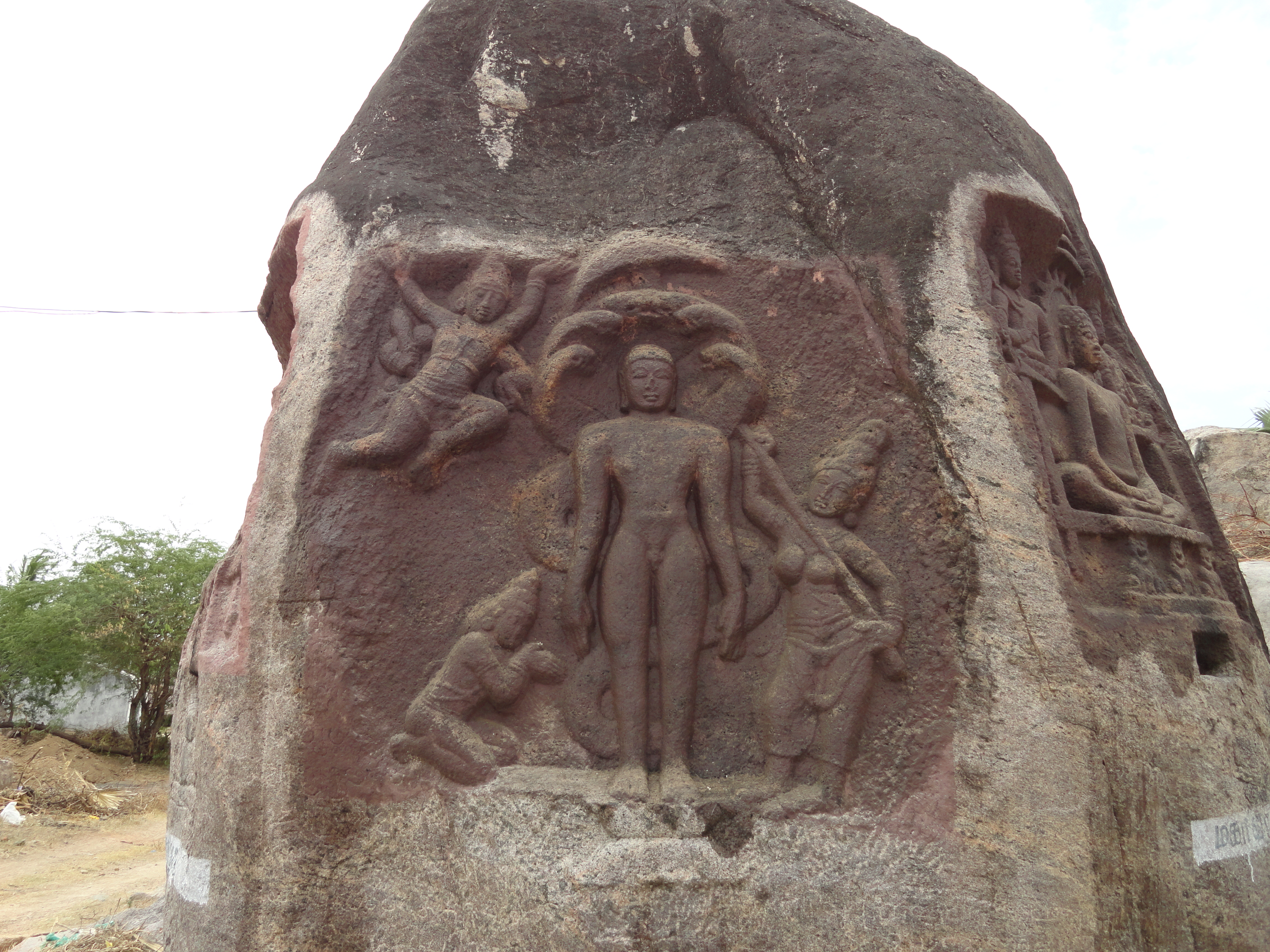
8th-century stone relief of Pārśvanātha at Thirakoil

According to the Kalpa Sūtra (a Śvētāmbara text), Pārśvanātha had 164,000 male lay followers (śrāvakas), 327,000 female lay followers (śrāvikās), 16,000 monks (sādhus) and 38,000 nuns (Sadhvis or aryikas). According to Śvētāmbara tradition, he had eight chief monks (ganadharas): Śubhadatta, Āryaghoṣa, Vasiṣṭha, Brahmacāri, Soma, Śrīdhara, Vīrabhadra and Yaśas. After his death, the Śvētāmbara believe that Śubhadatta became head of the monastic order and was succeeded by Haridatta, Āryasamudra and Keśī.

According to Digambara tradition (including the Avasyaka niryukti), Pārśvanātha had 10 ganadhars and Svayambhu was their leader. Śvētāmbara texts such as the Samavayanga and Kalpa Sūtras cite Pushpakula as the chief aryika of his female followers, but the Digambara Tiloyapannati text identifies her as Suloka or Sulocana. Pārśvanātha's without bonds (nirgrantha) monastic tradition was influential in ancient India, with Mahāvīra's parents part of it as lay householders who supported the ascetics.

=== Upkeśa Gaccha ===
The time period between Pārśvanātha and Mahāvīra was only 250 years, which is relatively short when compared to the periods between any two consecutive tīrthaṅkaras. According to ancient Śvetāmbara texts such as Uttaradhyayana Sutra, owing to this short period of time between both the tīrthaṅkaras, monks of Pārśvanātha's lineage existed during Mahāvīra's time period. Keśiśramanācharya, a monk of Parhsvanatha's lineage, is also said to have met Gautama Swami, the prime disciple of Mahāvīra. Pārśvanātha's monastic lineage is said to have begun with his prime disciple Arya Śubhadatta. Later, this lineage came to be known as the Upkeśa Gaccha of the Śvetāmbara tradition.

Keśī's (the 4th head of the monastic order in Pārśvanātha's monastic lineage) disciple Swayamprabhasūriwent on to create the Porwal and Srimali castes by preaching Jainism and strongly opposing animal sacrifice in Bhinmal and Padmavati region of present-day Rajasthan. Later, Swayamprabhasuri's disciple Ratnaprabhasūripreached Jainism in Osian and created the Oswal caste. The monastic lineage of Upkeśa Gaccha is particularly important as it narrates the history of Jainism before Mahāvīra and describes the creation of three of the most prominent castes of Jaina followers. It also suggests the antiquity of the Śvetāmbara tradition and that white-clad ascetics were the original followers of Jainism and of Pārśvanātha, who preceded naked ascetics of the Digambara sect.

=== Avakinnayo Karakandu ===
Karakandu was a great devotee of the 23rd Jaina tīrthaṅkaras Pārśvanātha who preached Jainism in Kaliṅgaaround 850 BCE. Also Jaina tradition mentions that King Avakinnayo Karakandu is responsible for the spread of Jainism in southern and western India. Due to this Jainism become the prominent religion of Kalinga and Dravida country during 8th century BCE even before the birth of the 24th Jaina tīrthaṅkaras Mahāvīra. According to Kanakmara, Karakanda had very strong faith in the teachings of the 23rd Jaina tīrthaṅkaras Pārśvanātha of his era. He strictly followed the Anuvratas and Gunavratas principles of Jainism, which are applicable for both monks and household people according to Jainism.

== Teachings ==
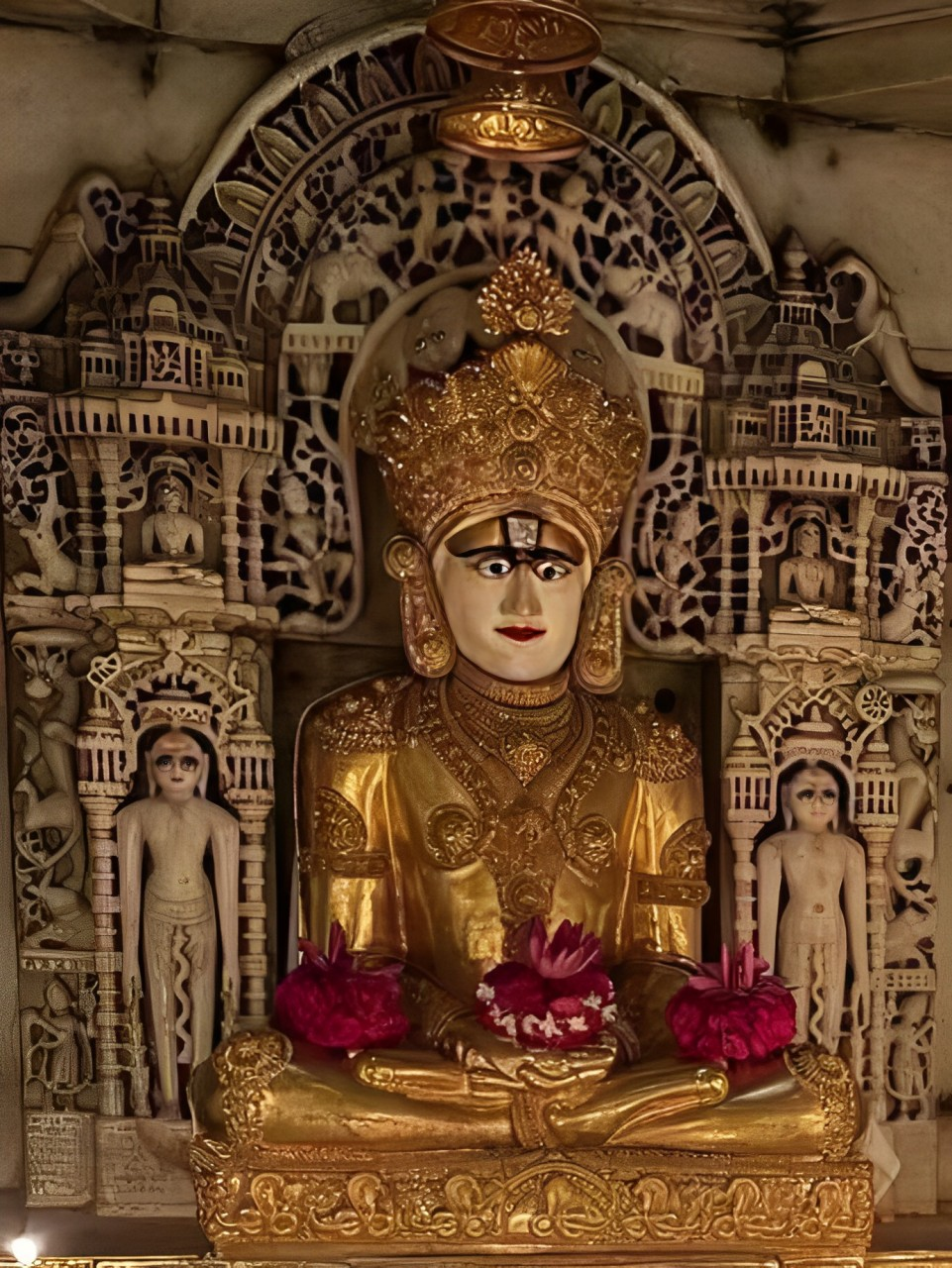
The ancient idol of Parshvanatha at Shankheshwar, Gujarat

Texts of the two major Jaina sects (Digambara and Śvētāmbara) have different views of Pārśvanātha and Mahāvīra's teachings, which underlie disputes between the sects. Digambaras maintain that no difference exists between the teachings of Pārśvanātha and Mahāvīra. According to the Śvētāmbaras, Mahāvīra expanded the scope of Pārśvanātha's first four restraints with his ideas on ahimsa (non-violence) and added the fifth monastic vow (celibacy) to the practice of asceticism. Pārśvanātha did not require celibacy, and allowed monks to wear simple outer garments. Śvētāmbara texts such as section 2.15 of the Ācārāṅga Sūtra say that Mahāvīra's parents were followers of Pārśvanātha, linking Mahāvīra to a preexisting theology as a reformer of Jaina mendicant tradition.

According to the Śvētāmbara tradition, Pārśvanātha and the ascetic community he founded exercised a fourfold restraint; Mahāvīra stipulated five great vows for his ascetic initiation. This difference and its reason have often been discussed in Śvētāmbara texts.

The Uttardhyayana Sutra (a Śvētāmbara text) describes Keśin Dālbhya as a follower of Pārśvanātha and Indrabhuti Gautama as a disciple of Mahāvīra and discusses which doctrine is true: the fourfold restraint or the five great vows. Gautama says that there are outward differences, and these differences are "because the moral and intellectual capabilities of the followers of the ford-makers have differed".

According to Wendy Doniger, Pārśvanātha allowed monks to wear clothes; Mahāvīra recommended nude asceticism, a practice which has been a significant difference between the Digambara and Śvētāmbara traditions.

According to the Śvētāmbara texts, Pārśvanātha's four restraints were ahimsa, aparigraha (non-possession), asteya (non-stealing) and satya (non-lying). Ancient Buddhist texts (such as the Samaññaphala Sutta) which mention Jaina ideas and Mahāvīra cite the four restraints, rather than the five vows of later Jaina texts. This has led scholars such as Hermann Jacobi to say that when Mahāvīra and the Buddha met, the Buddhists knew only about the four restraints of the Pārśvanātha tradition. Further scholarship suggests a more complex situation, because some of the earliest Jaina literature (such as section 1.8.1 of the Ācārāṅga Sūtra) connects Mahāvīra with three restraints: non-violence, non-lying, and non-possession.

The "less than five vows" view of Śvētāmbara texts is not accepted by the Digambaras, a tradition whose canonical texts have been lost and who do not accept Śvētāmbara texts as canonical. Digambaras have a sizable literature, however, which explains their disagreement with Śvētāmbara interpretations. Prafulla Modi rejects the theory of differences between Pārśvanātha's and Mahāvīra's teachings. Champat Rai Jaina writes that Śvētāmbara texts insist on celibacy for their monks (the fifth vow in Mahāvīra's teachings), and there must not have been a difference between the teachings of Pārśvanātha and Mahāvīra.

Padmanabh Jaini writes that the Digambaras interpret "fourfold" as referring "not to four specific vows", but to "four modalities" (which were adapted by Mahāvīra into five vows). Western and some Indian scholarship "has been essentially Śvētāmbara scholarship", and has largely ignored Digambara literature related to the controversy about Pārśvanātha's and Mahāvīra's teachings. Paul Dundas writes that medieval Jaina literature, such as that by the 9th-century Silanka, suggests that the practices of "not using another's property without their explicit permission" and celibacy were interpreted as part of non-possession.

== In literature ==
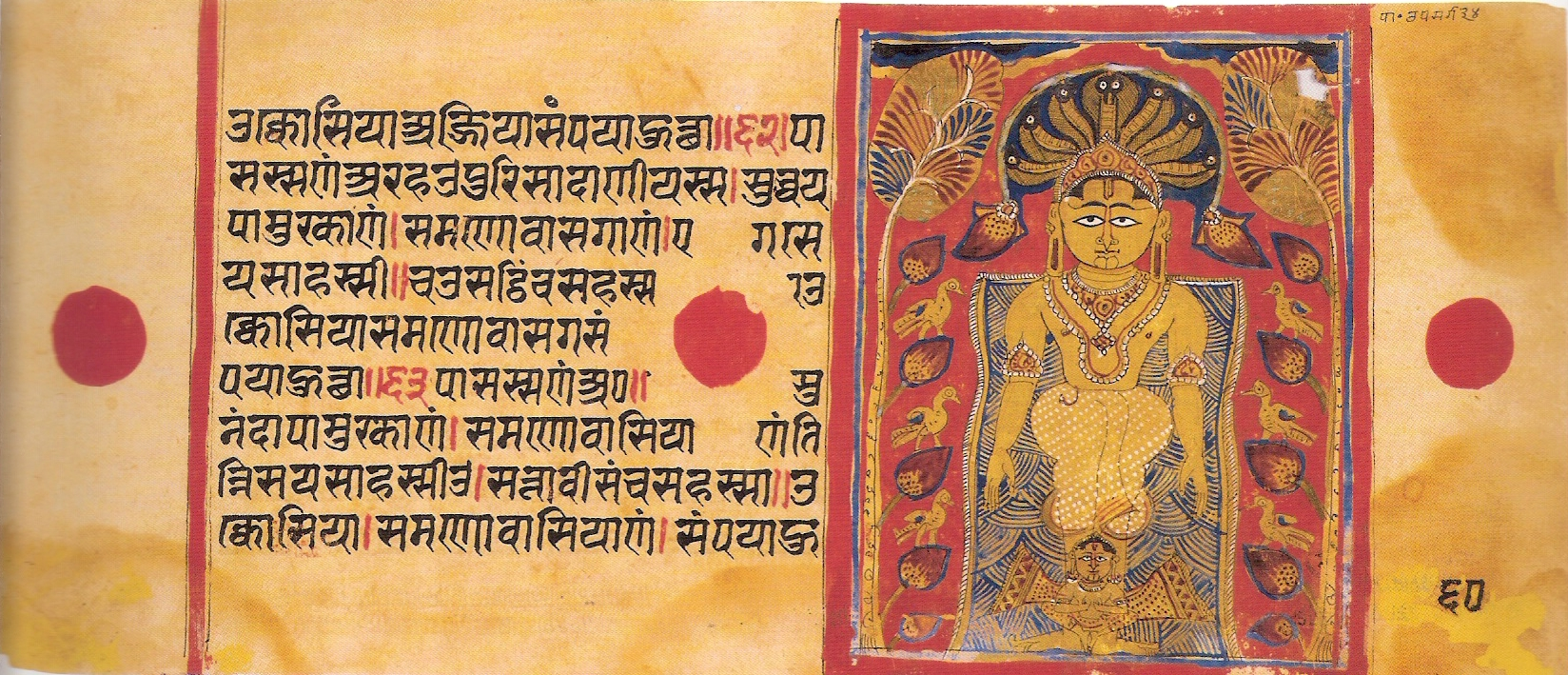
Parsva, Kalpa Sūtra (c. 1472)

The Kalpa Sūtra contains biographies of the tīrthaṅkaras Pārśvanātha and Mahāvīra. Vyākhyāprajñapti sūtra is one of the earliest texts mentioning Pārśvanātha as Arhat. Uvasagharam Stotra is an ode to Pārśvanātha which was written by sage Bhadrabahu. Jinasena's Mahapurāṇa includes "Ādi purāṇa" and Uttarapurāṇa. It was completed by Jinasena's 8th-century disciple, Gunabhadra. "Ādi purāṇa" describes the lives of Rishabhanatha, Bahubali and Bharata. Pārśvabhyudaya by Jinsena is a narration of the life of Pārśvanātha. Bhayahara Stotra composed by Acharya Manatunga, 7th century, is an adoration of Pārśvanātha. Sankhesvara Stotram is hymn to Pārśvanātha compiled by Mahopadhyaya Yashovijaya. Shankheshwar Pārśvanath Stavan, hymn dedicated to Shankheshwar Pārśvanath, is one of the most performed Jaina prayer.

Pasanaha-chairu is a hagiography of Pārśvanātha composed by Shridhara in 1132 AD. Pārśvanath bhavaantar is a kirtan (devotion song), compiled by Gangadas in 1690 AD, which narrates life of previous nine births. The medieval forty-four verse hymn Kalyanamandira stotra, composed by Digambar kumudachandra, is a praise to Pārśvanātha is popular among both Digambar and Śvētāmbara. Pārśvanātha charite is a poem composed by Shantikirt Muni in 1730 AD, this poem narrates the seven siddhis of Pārśvanātha.

Guru Gobind Singh wrote a biography of Pārśvanātha in the 17th-century Paranath Avtar, part of the Dasam Granth.

== Iconography ==
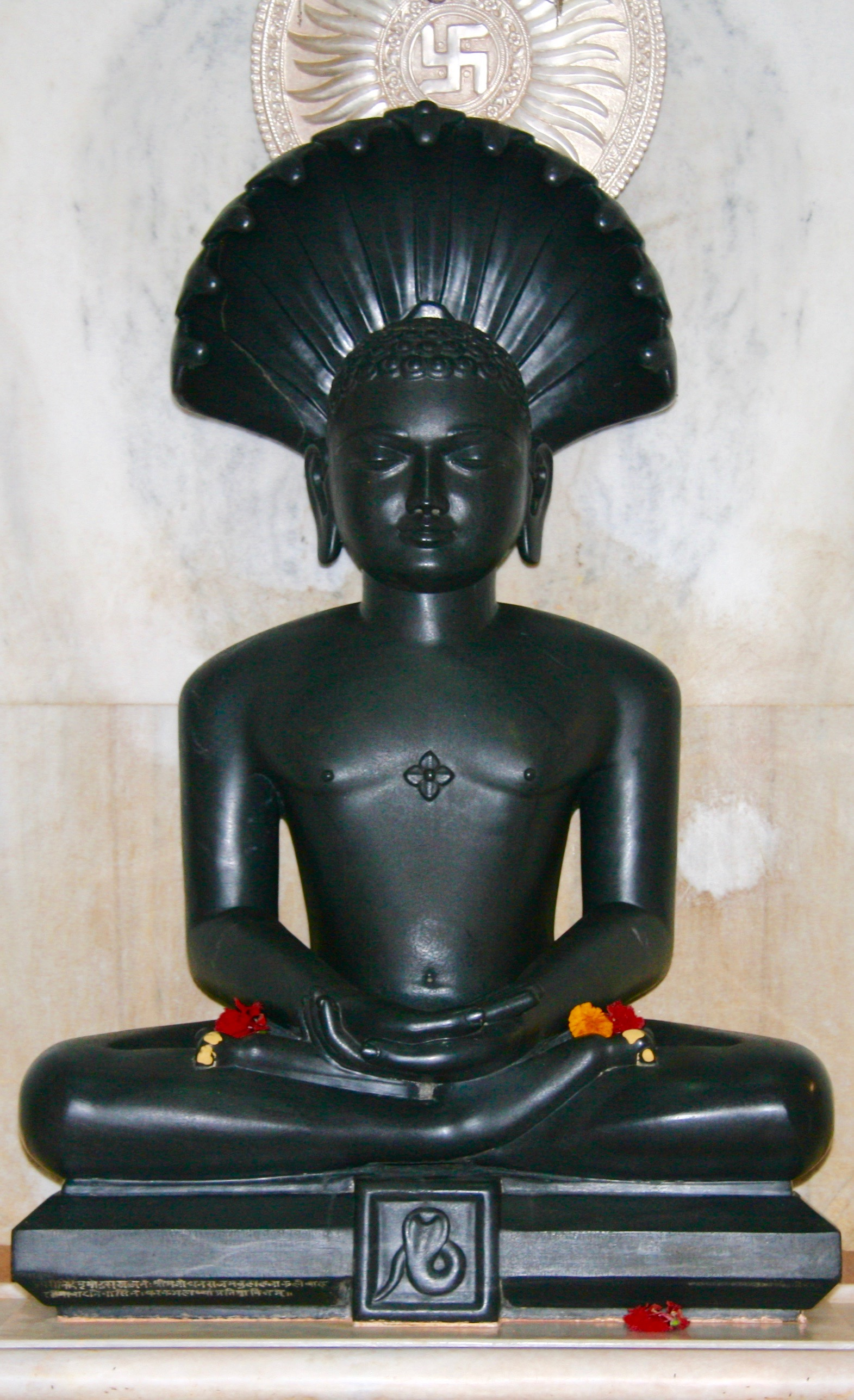
Pārśvanātha iconography is identified by a sesha hood above his head and a cobra stamped (or carved) beneath his feet. At the center of his chest is a shrivatsa, which identifies Jaina statues. This is the Digambara iconography

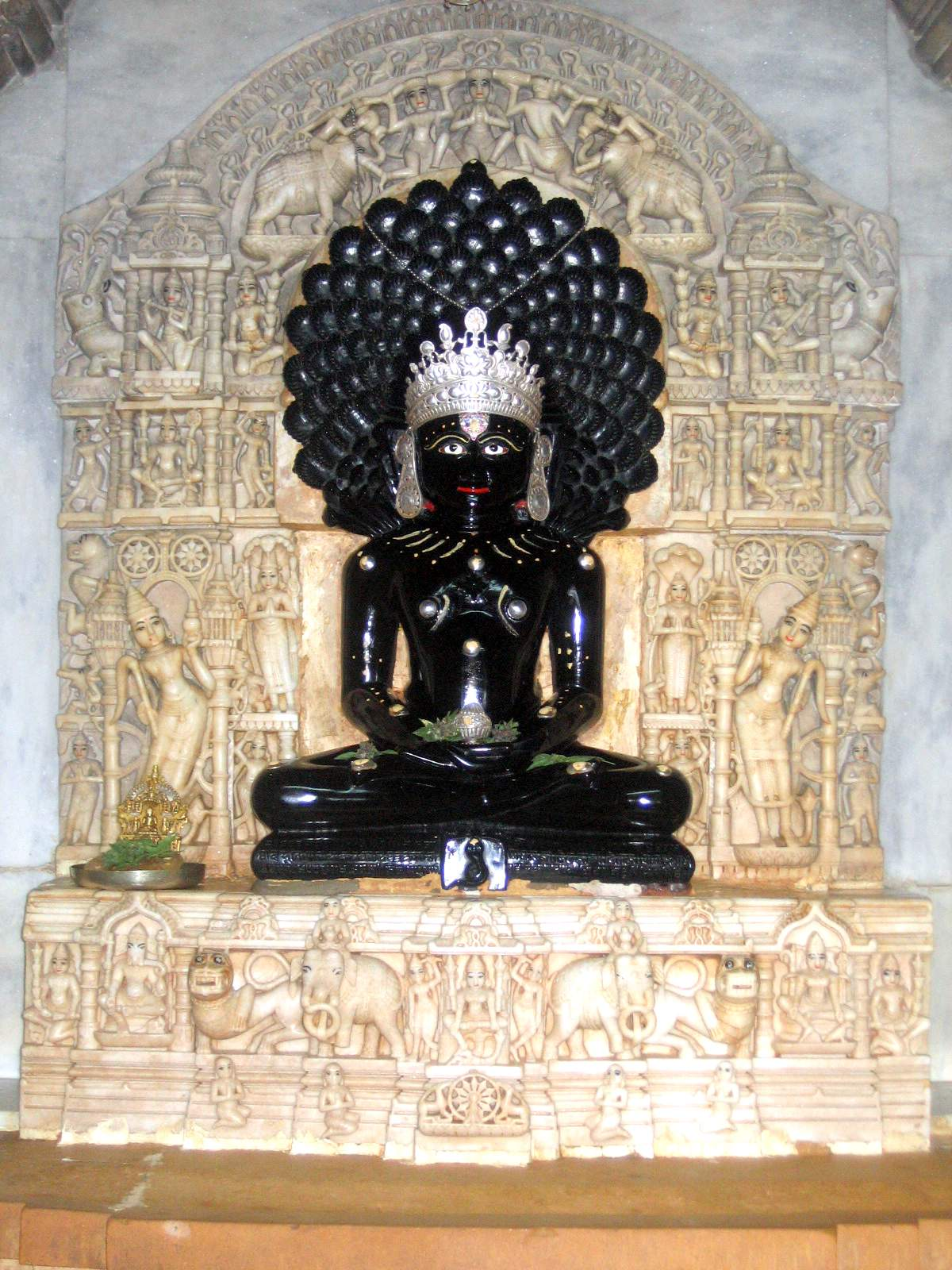
Pārśvanātha iconography is identified by a sesha hood above his head and a cobra stamped (or carved) beneath his feet. At the center of his chest is a shrivatsa, which identifies Jaina statues. This is the Svetambara iconography.

Pārśvanātha is a popular tirthankar who is worshiped (bhakti) with Rishabhanatha, Shantinatha, Neminatha and Mahāvīra. He is believed to have the power to remove obstacles and save devotees. In Shvetambara tradition, there are 108 prominent idols of Pārśvanath idols these idols derive their name from a geographical region, such as Shankheshwar Pārśvanath and Panchasara Pārśvanath.

Pārśvanātha is usually depicted in a lotus or kayotsarga posture. Statues and paintings show his head shielded by a multi-headed serpent, fanned out like an umbrella. Pārśvanātha's snake emblem is carved (or stamped) beneath his legs as an icon identifier. His iconography is usually accompanied by Dharnendra and Padmavati, Jainism's snake god and goddess.

Serpent-hood iconography is not unique to Pārśvanātha; it is also found above the icons of Suparshvanatha, the seventh of the 24 tirthankaras, but with a small difference. SuPārśvanātha's serpent hood has five heads, and a seven (or more)-headed serpent is found in Pārśvanātha icons. Statues of both tirthankaras with serpent hoods have been found in Uttar Pradesh and Tamil Nadu, dating to the 5th to 10th centuries. Earliest images of Pārśvanātha having seven snakes over his head date back to first century BCE.

Archeological sites and medieval Pārśvanātha iconography found in temples and caves include scenes and yaksha. Digambara and Śvētāmbara iconography differs; Śvētāmbara art shows Pārśvanātha with a serpent hood and a Ganesha-like yaksha, and Digambara art depicts him with serpent hood and Dhranendra. According to Umakant Premanand Shah, Hindu gods (such as Ganesha) as yaksha and Indra as serving Pārśvanātha, assigned them to a subordinate position.

=== Ancient artifacts and idols ===
The Parsvanatha ayagapata, excavated from Kankali Tila in Mathura, is an early homage tablet dedicated to the tirthankara. Dating to the Kushan period (1st and 2nd centuries CE), the tablet depicts Pārśvanātha in the center, seated in the dhyāna mudrā (meditative lotus position). His iconography is identifiable by the seven-hooded serpent canopy above his head and the shrivatsa symbol on his chest.

He is also featured in the Chausa hoard in Bihar, which contains the oldest known Jain bronzes in India, dating between the Shunga and Gupta periods. Because these early bronze artifacts were cast before the widespread adoption of specific pedestal emblems (lanchhanas), Pārśvanātha is one of the only tirthankaras definitively identifiable within the hoard due to his characteristic multi-headed serpent canopy.

The Kahaum pillar, erected in 460 CE during the reign of Skandagupta, Gupta Empire, bears an inscription that is adoration to Arihant and features a carving of Pārśvanātha.

Archaeological evidence of his veneration in western India was recovered from the Akota hoard in Gujarat. Documented extensively by art historian Umakant Premanand Shah, this excavation yielded rare, highly preserved post-Gupta bronze depictions of Pārśvanātha dating to the 9th century. These artifacts demonstrate continuous and advanced metallurgical casting traditions within the medieval Jain community.

Further medieval artifacts were discovered in the Vasantgarh hoard in Rajasthan. Dating from the 7th to the 11th centuries CE, this collection includes significant bronze idols of Pārśvanātha that highlight the artistic evolution of western Indian metallurgy. Another major archaeological discovery is the Hansi hoard, excavated from the Asigarh Fort in Haryana. Dating to the 8th and 9th centuries CE, this collection features several elaborate bronze idols of Pārśvanātha, prominently displaying his serpent canopy. Additionally, 11th-century Digambara bronzes were recovered from the Aluara hoard near Dhanbad, Jharkhand. Currently preserved at the Patna Museum, this hoard contains notable metallic representations of Pārśvanātha that demonstrate the regional spread of his veneration.

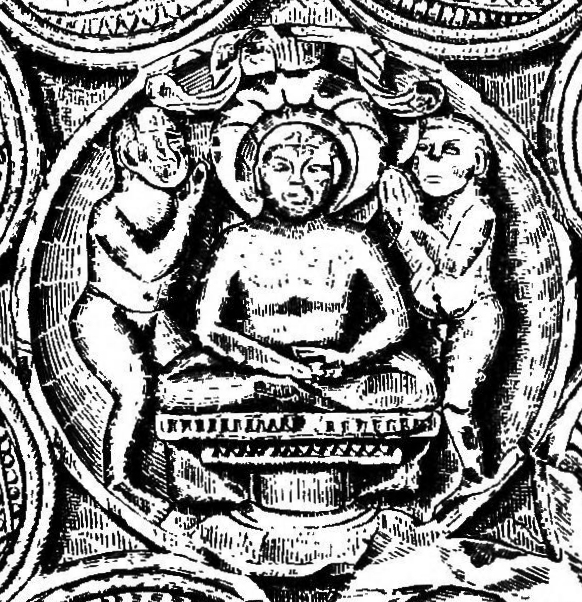
Parsvanatha ayagapata, Mathura art, c. 15 CE

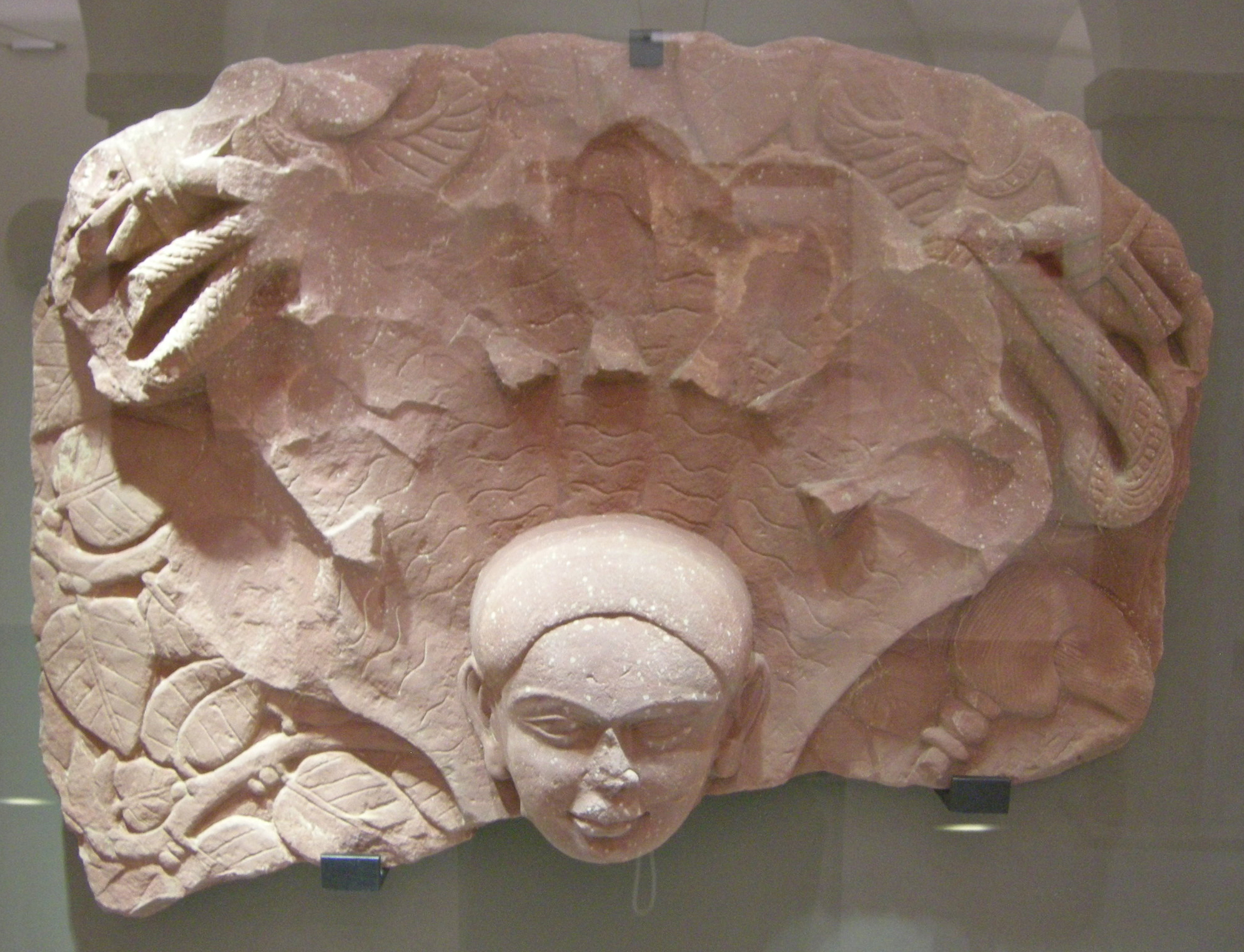
Uttar Pradesh, 2nd century (Museum of Oriental Art)

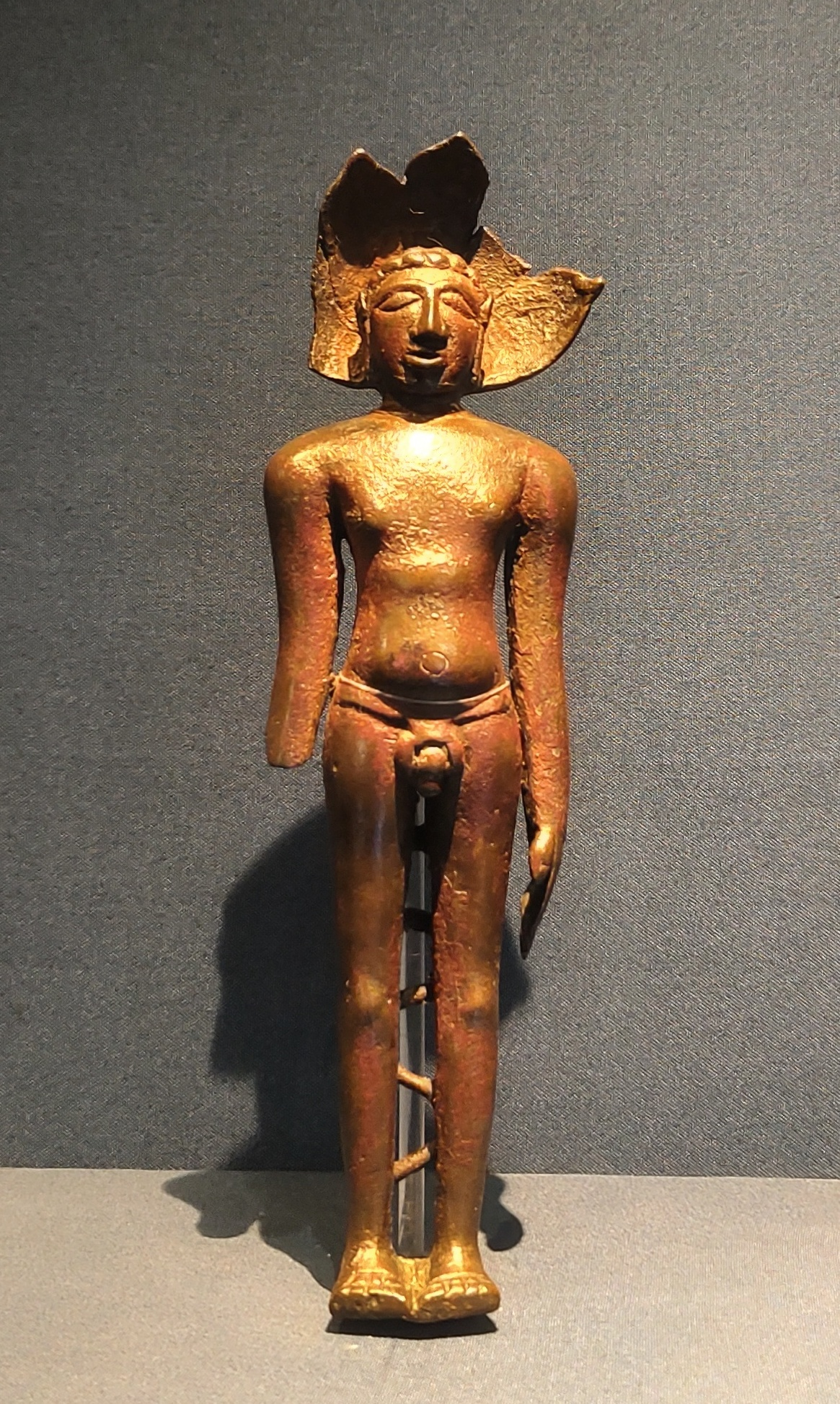
Eastern India, 2nd century BCE - 2nd century CE (CSMVS)

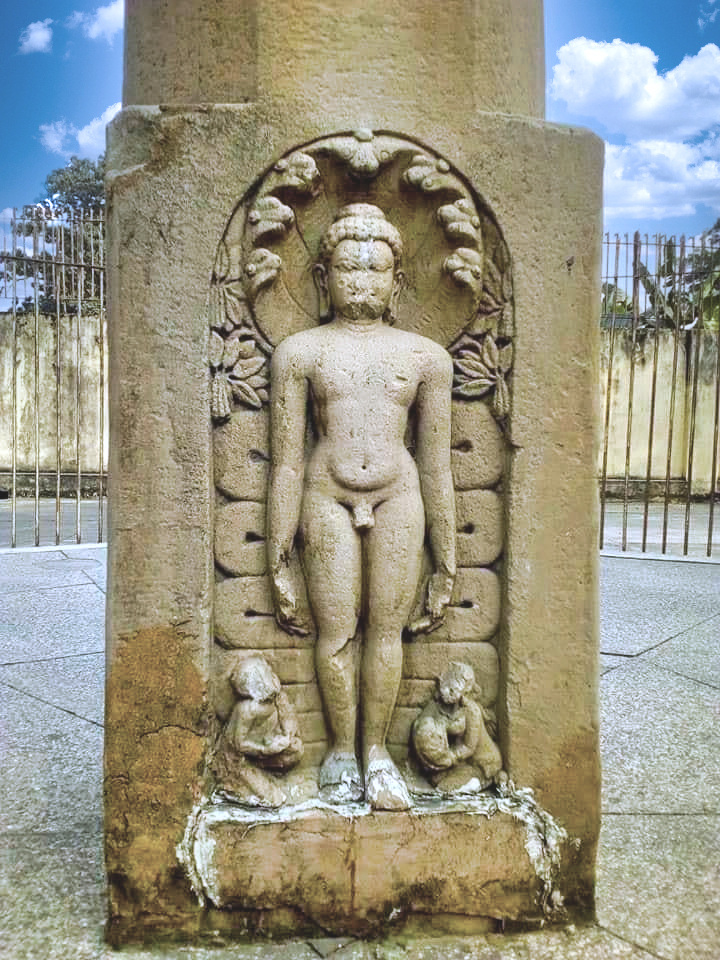
Pārśvanath relief of Kahaum pillar, 5th century

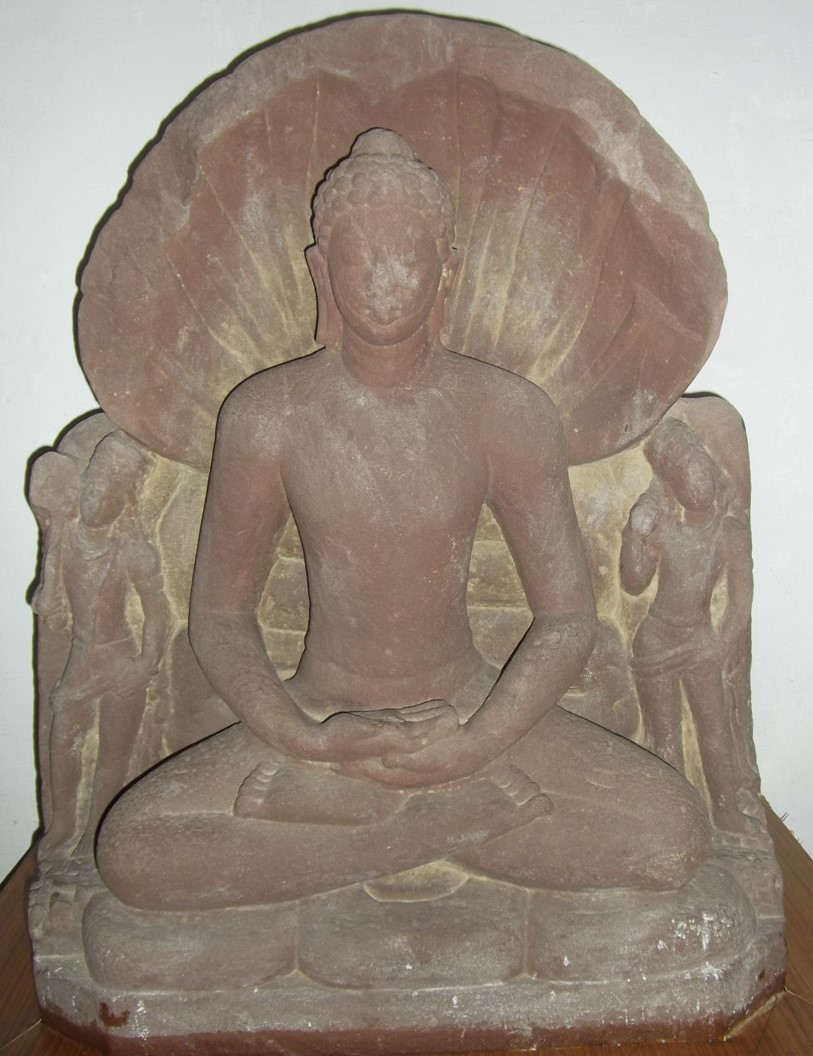
5th century (Satna, Madhya Pradesh)

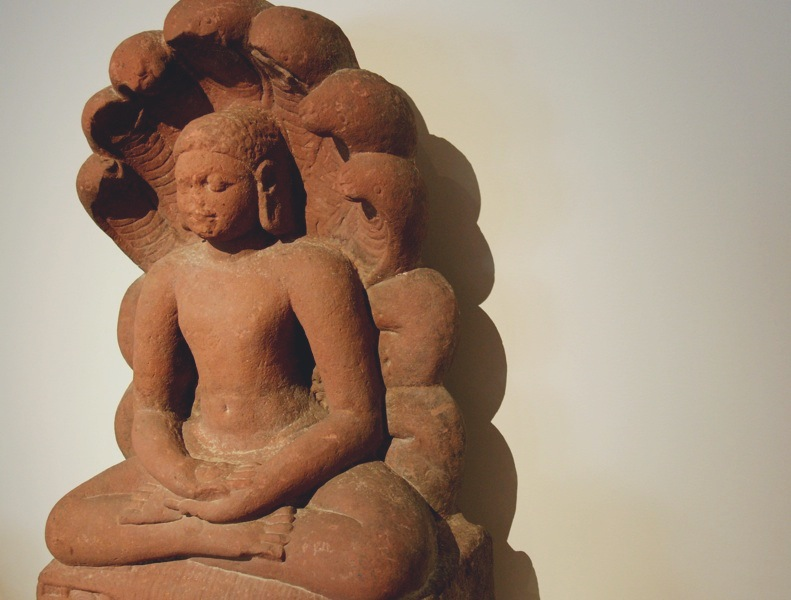
6th century, Uttar Pradesh

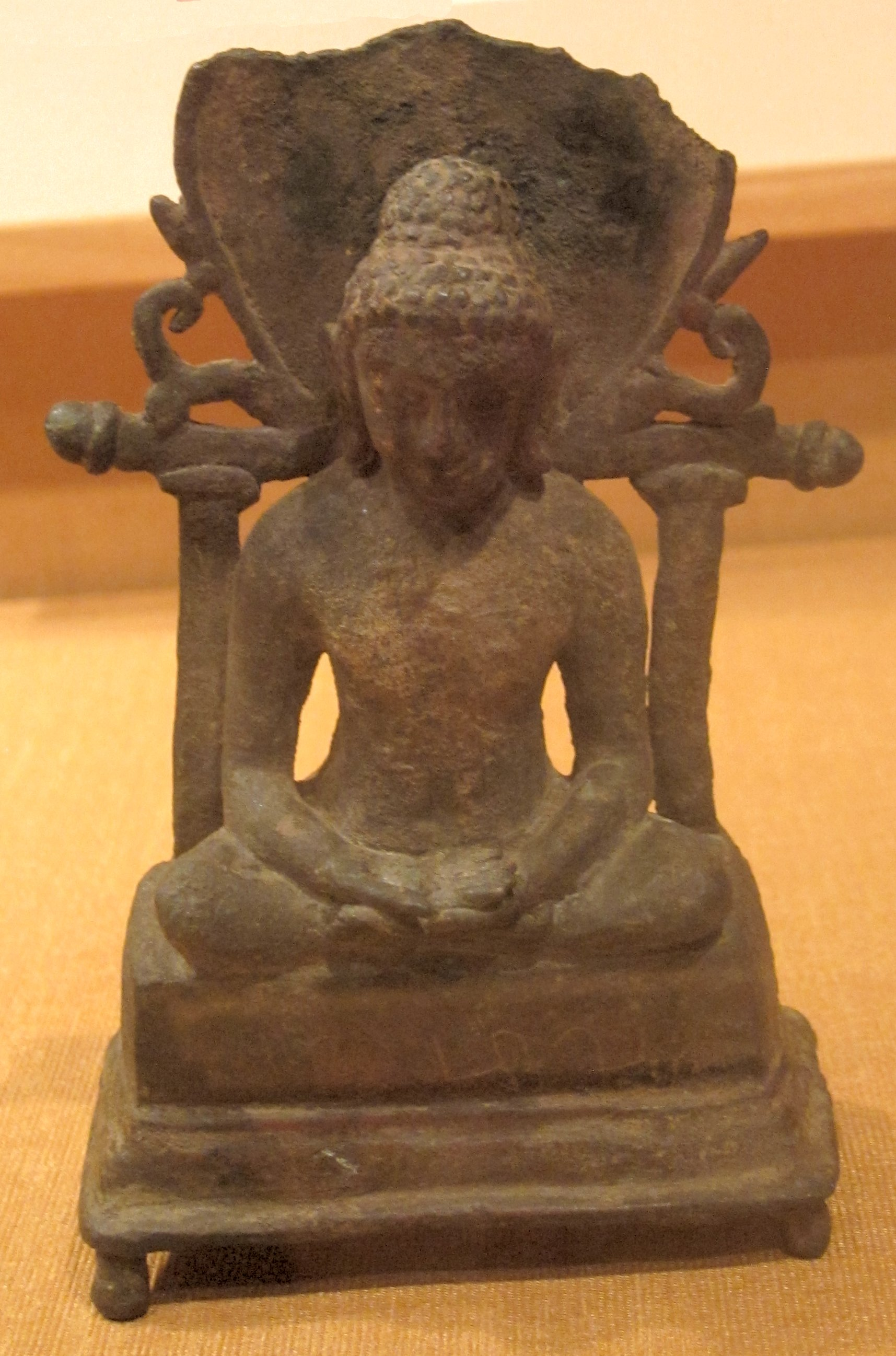
7th-century Akota Bronze (Honolulu Museum of Art)

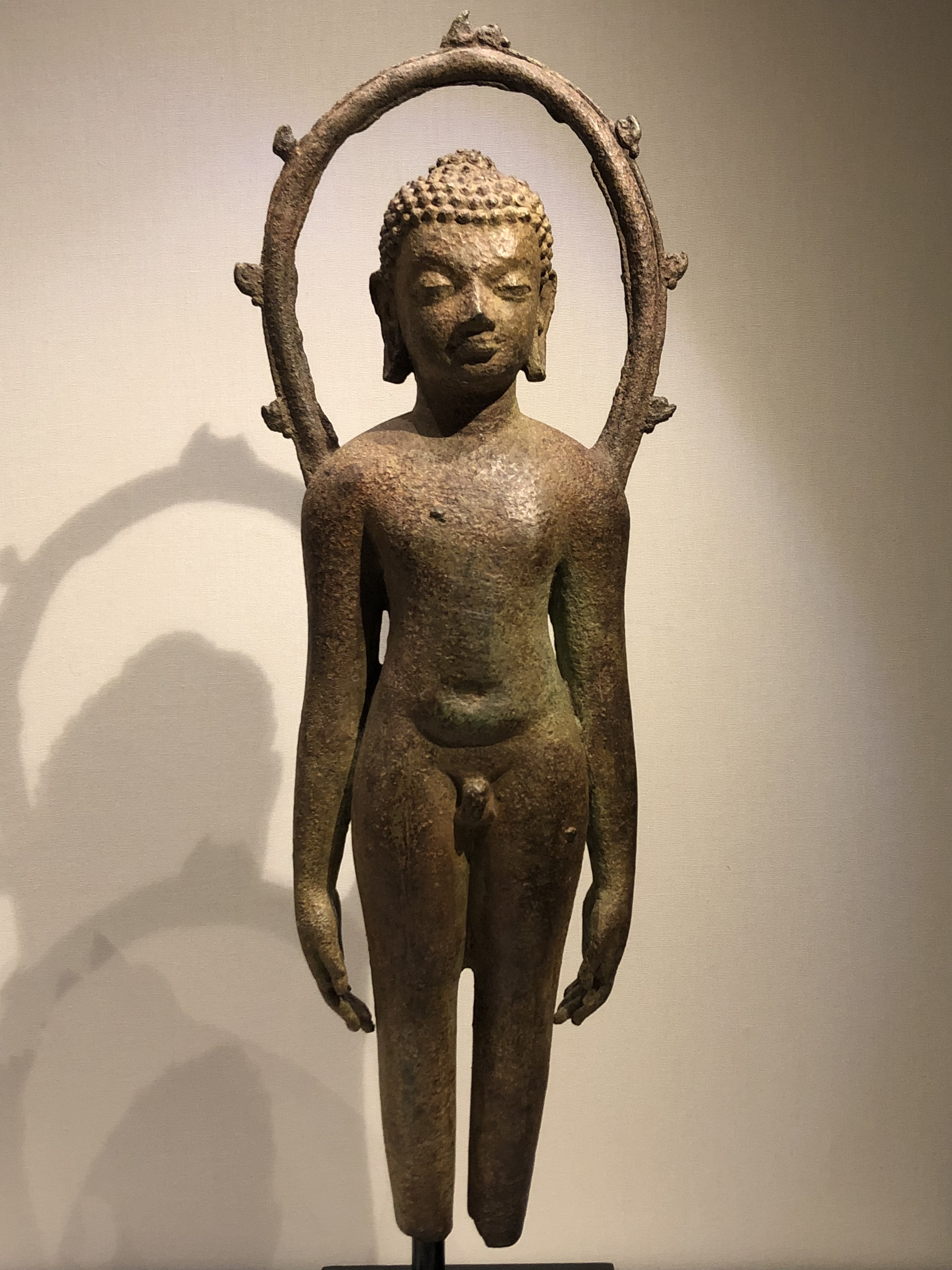
6th–7th century bronze statue in Asian Civilisations Museum

9th century - Cleveland Museum of Art

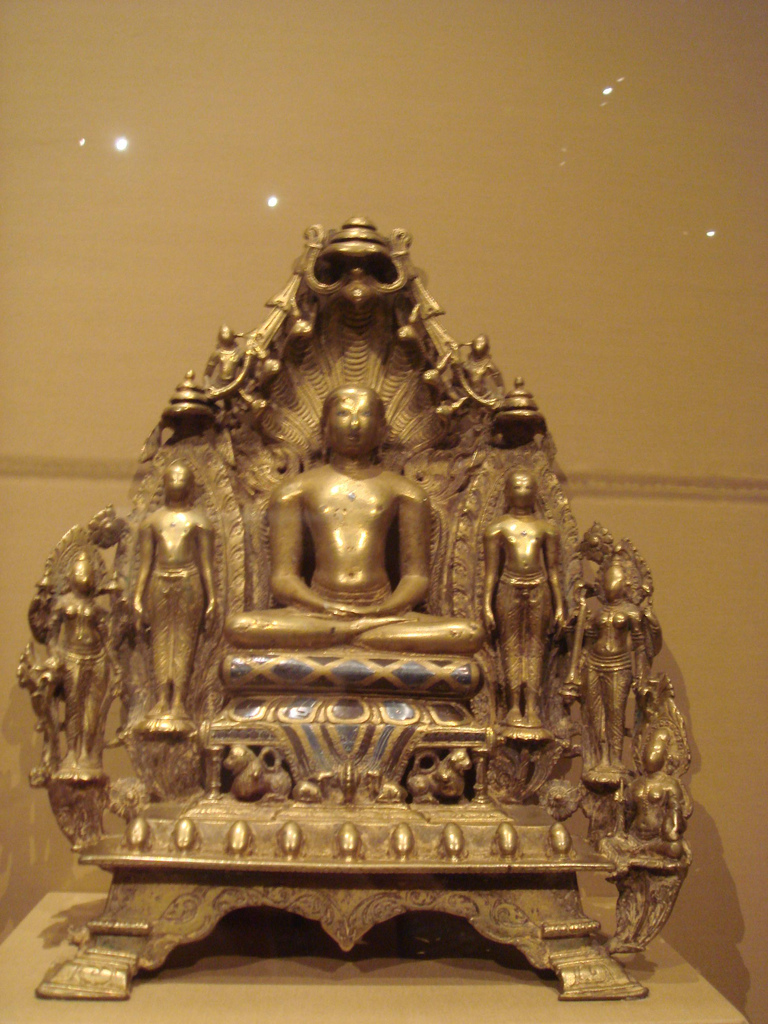
10th-century copper, inlaid with silver and gemstones (LACMA)

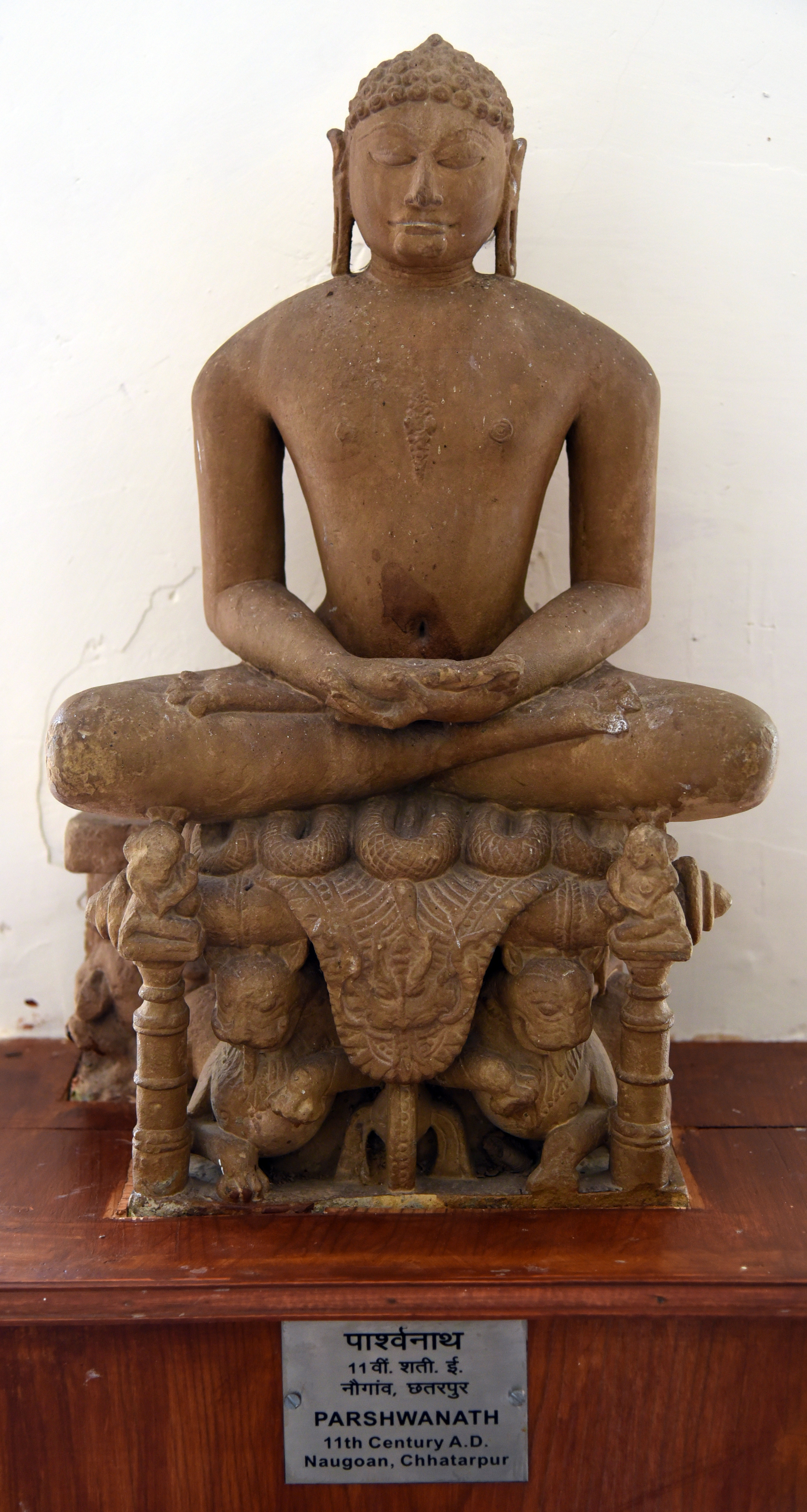
11th century, Maharaja Chhatrasal Museum

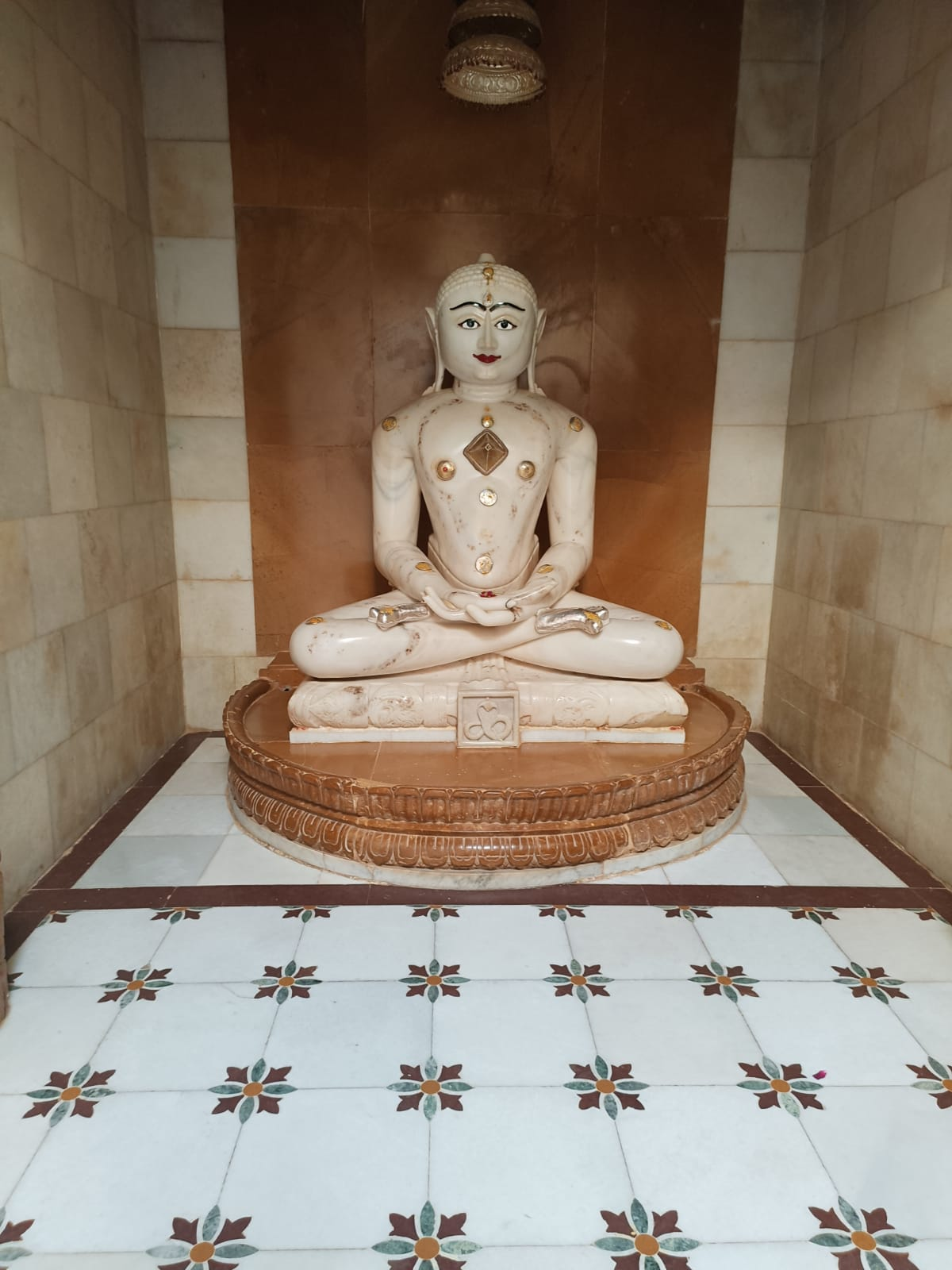
Ancient Idol of Amizara Parshwanath in a Cave Temple at Girnar Hill

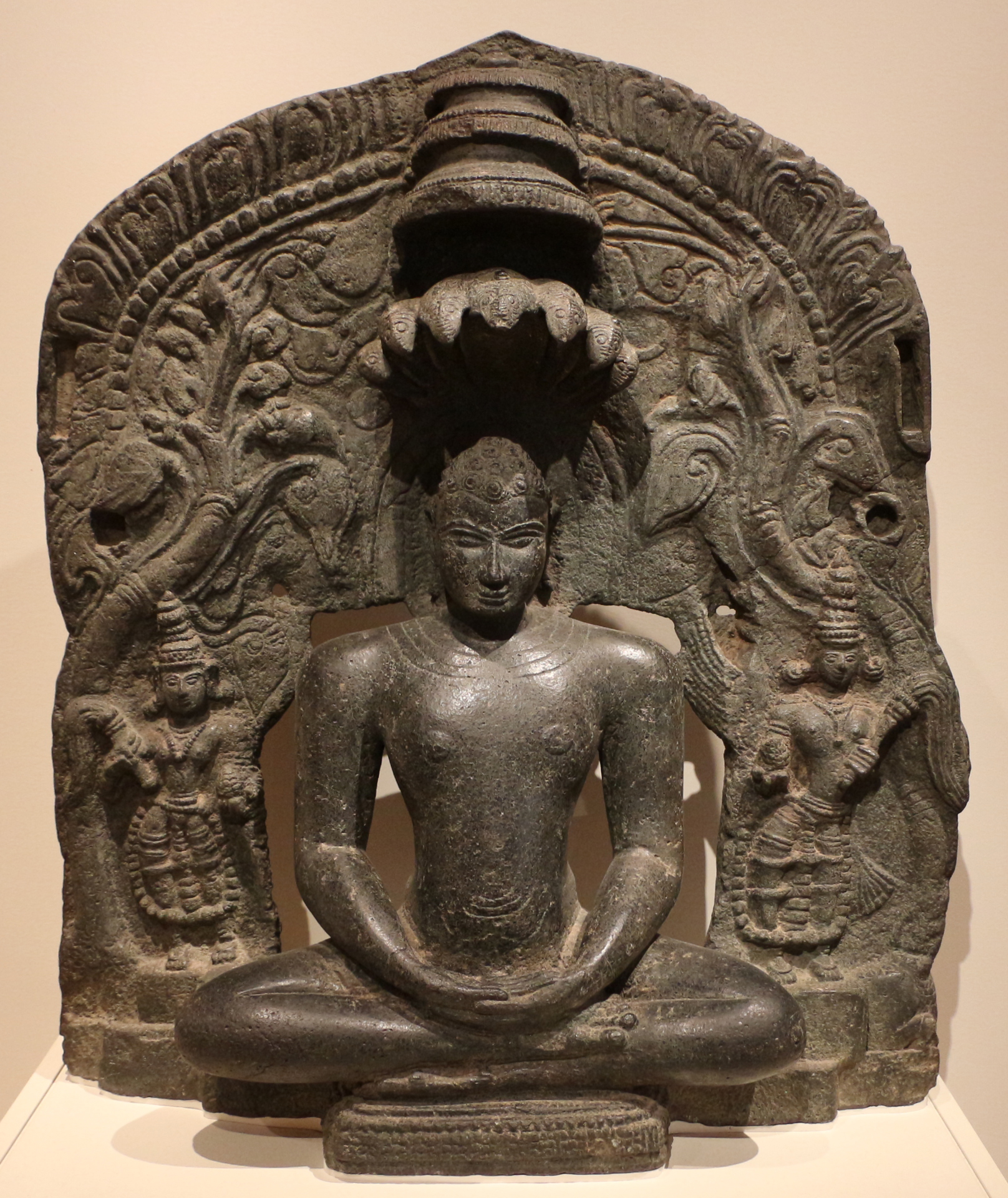
Karnataka, 12th century (Art Institute of Chicago)

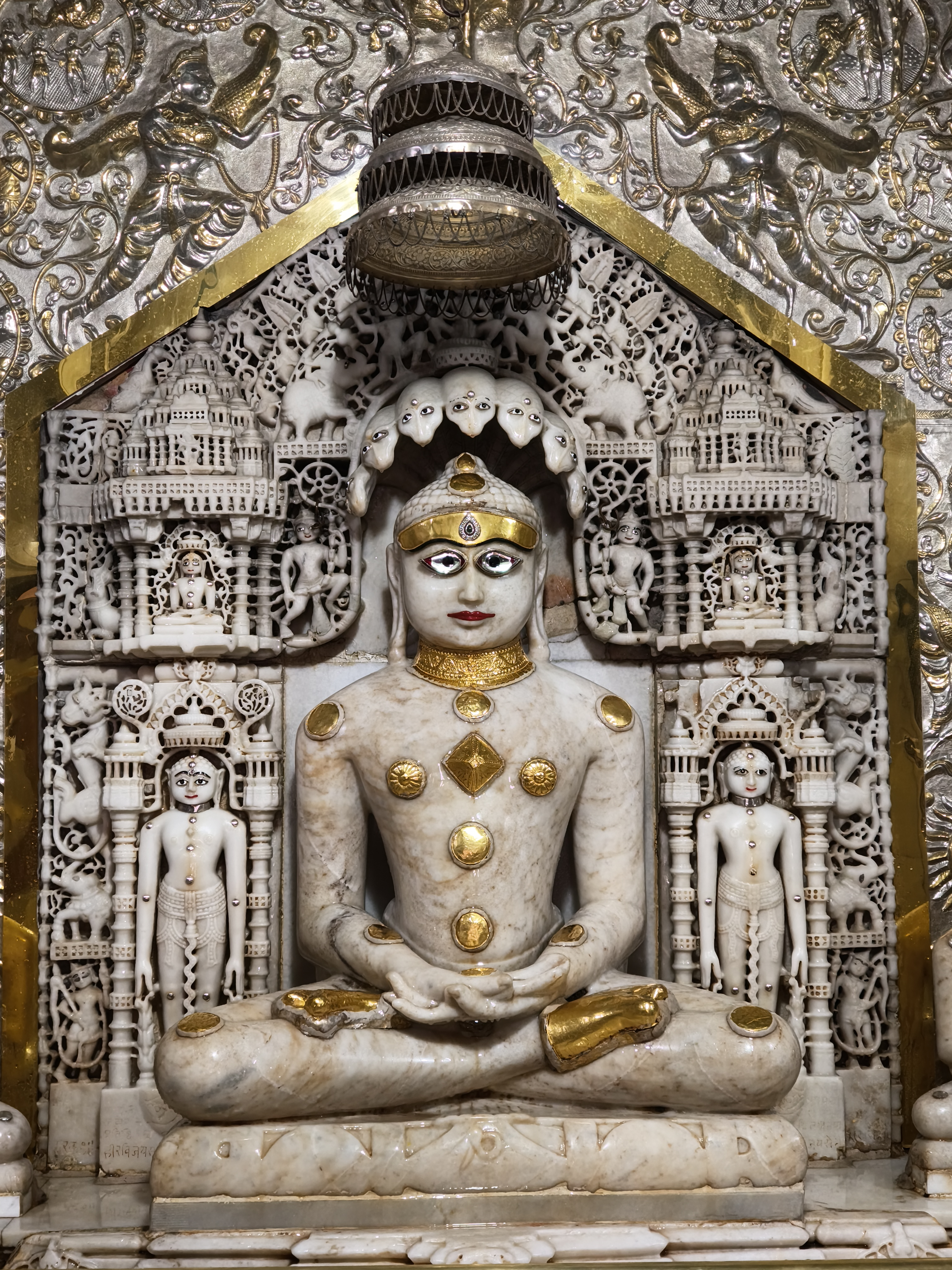
Pañcāsara Pārśvanātha at Patan (Gujarat)

== Colossal statues ==
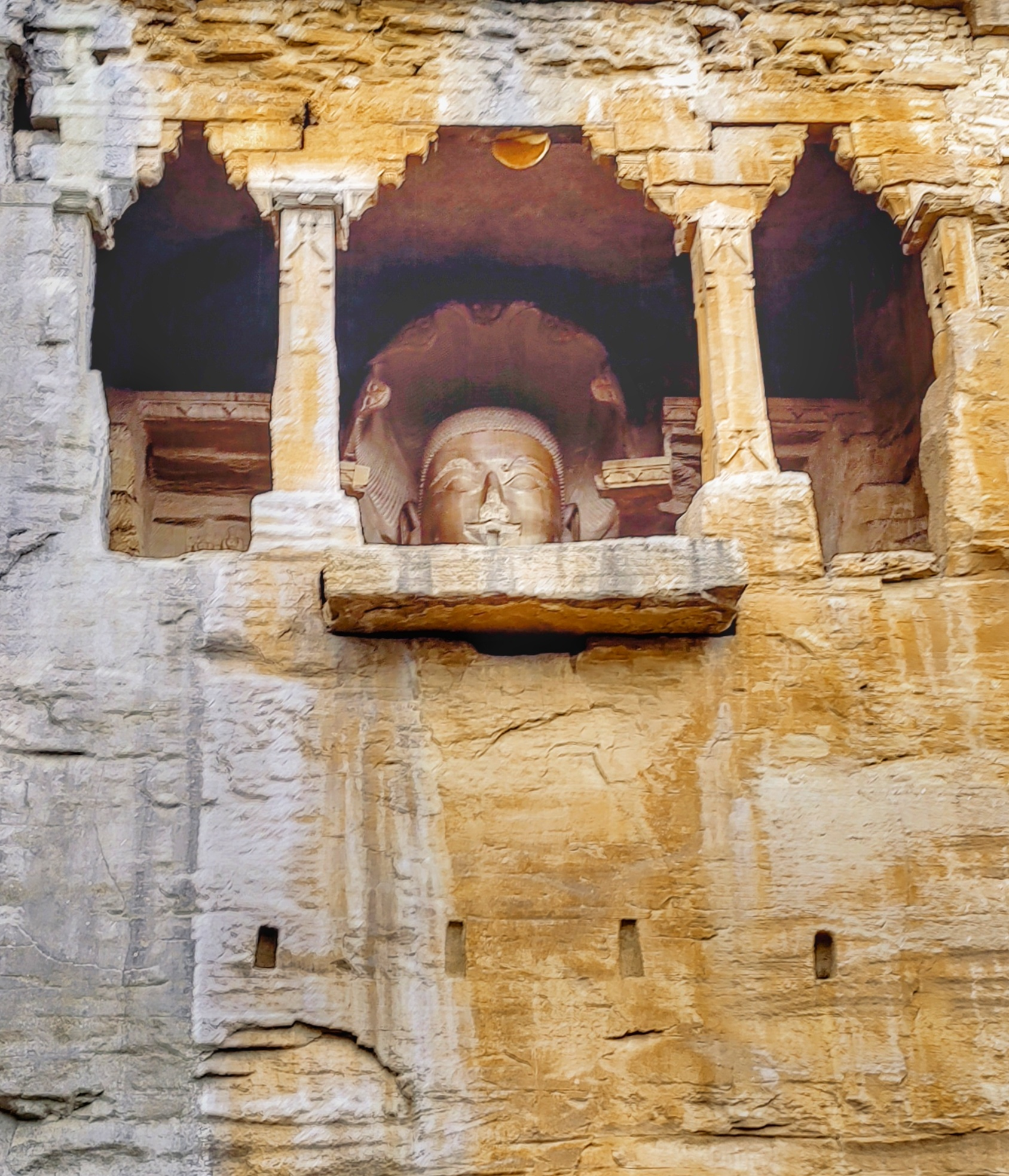
47 feet (14 m) Pārśvanātha statue in lotus position, one of the Gopachal rock-cut Jain monuments built by Tomaras of Gwalior during 14th and 15th centuries

Historical monuments feature several large-scale depictions of Pārśvanātha. The Gopachal rock cut Jain monuments were built between 1398 and 1536. The largest cross-legged statue of Pārśvanātha – 47 feet (14 m) tall and 30 feet (9.1 m) wide – is in one of the caves. An 11th-century Parshvanatha basadi, Shravanabelgola enshrines an 18-foot-tall (5.5 m) statue of Pārśvanātha in a kayotsarga position. Jain temples, Halebidu, built by Boppadeva in 1133 AD during the reign of King Vishnuvardhana, contains an 18-foot (5.5 m) black granite kayotsarga statue of Pārśvanātha.

In contemporary India, the construction of colossal religious icons has emerged as a distinct architectural and socio-political phenomenon. The Navagraha Jain Temple has the tallest statue of Pārśvanātha: 61 feet (19 m), on a 48 feet (15 m) pedestal. The statue, in the kayotsarga position, weighs about 185 tons. A 31-foot (9.4 m) kayotsarga statue was installed in 2011 at the Vahelna Jaina Temple. Vadodara Municipal Corporation has approved construction of 100 feet (30 m) tall statue in Sama pond in Vadodara.

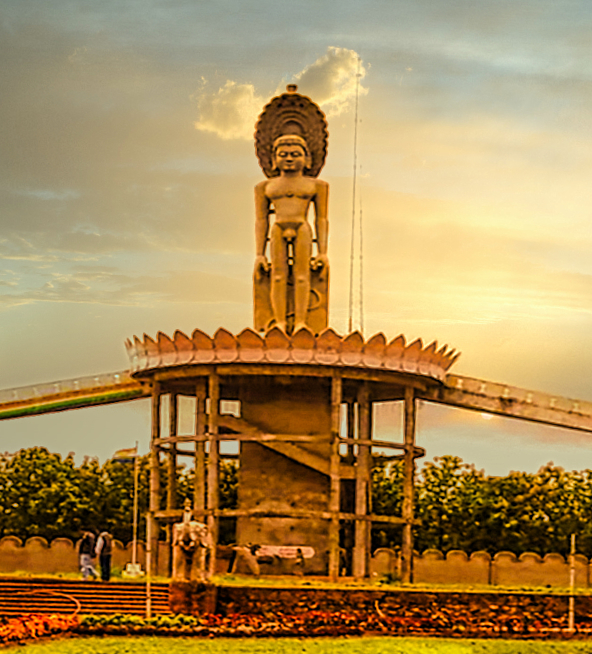
61 feet (19 m) colossal at Navagraha Jaina Temple

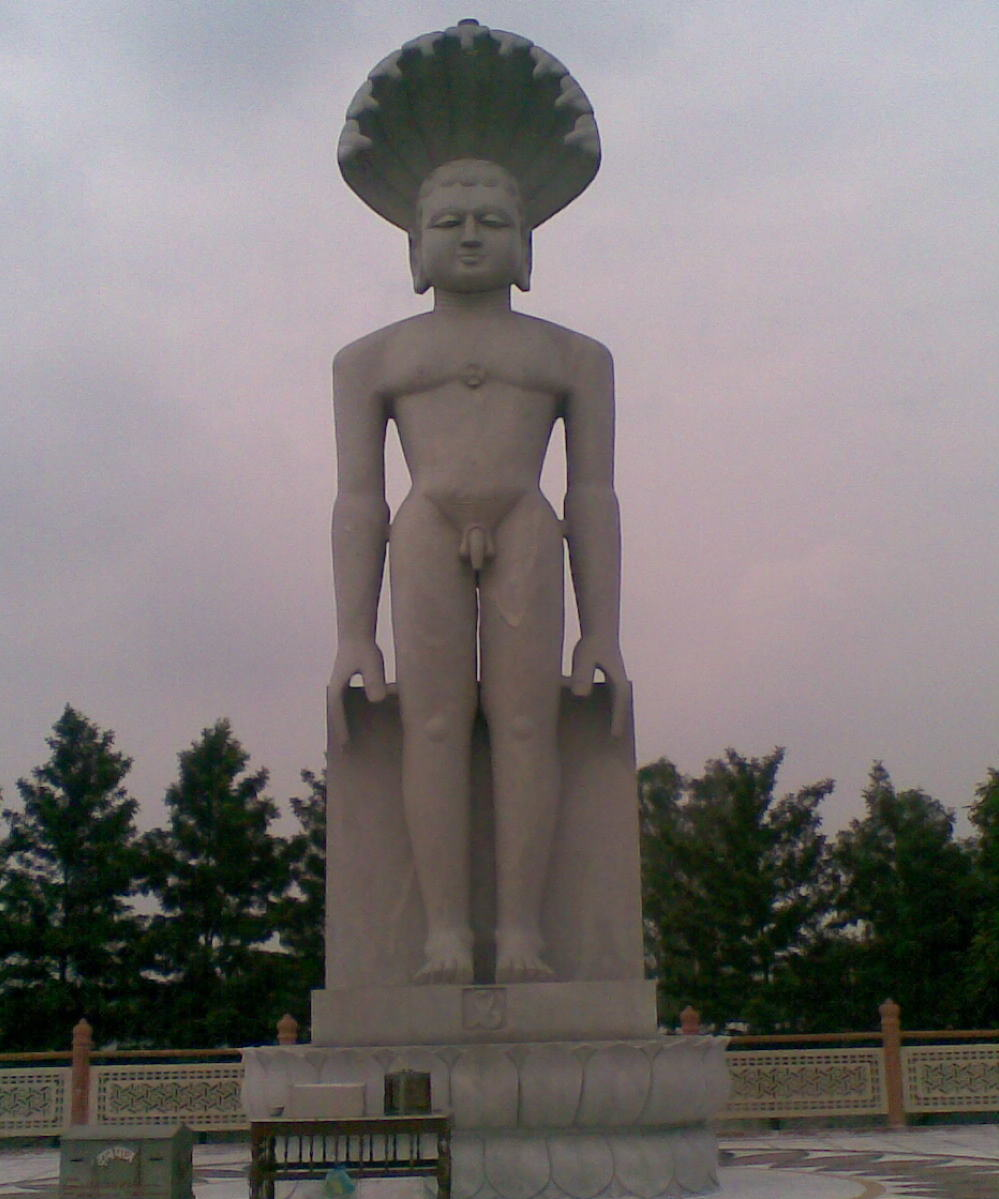
31 feet (9.4 m) statue at Vahelna Jaina temple

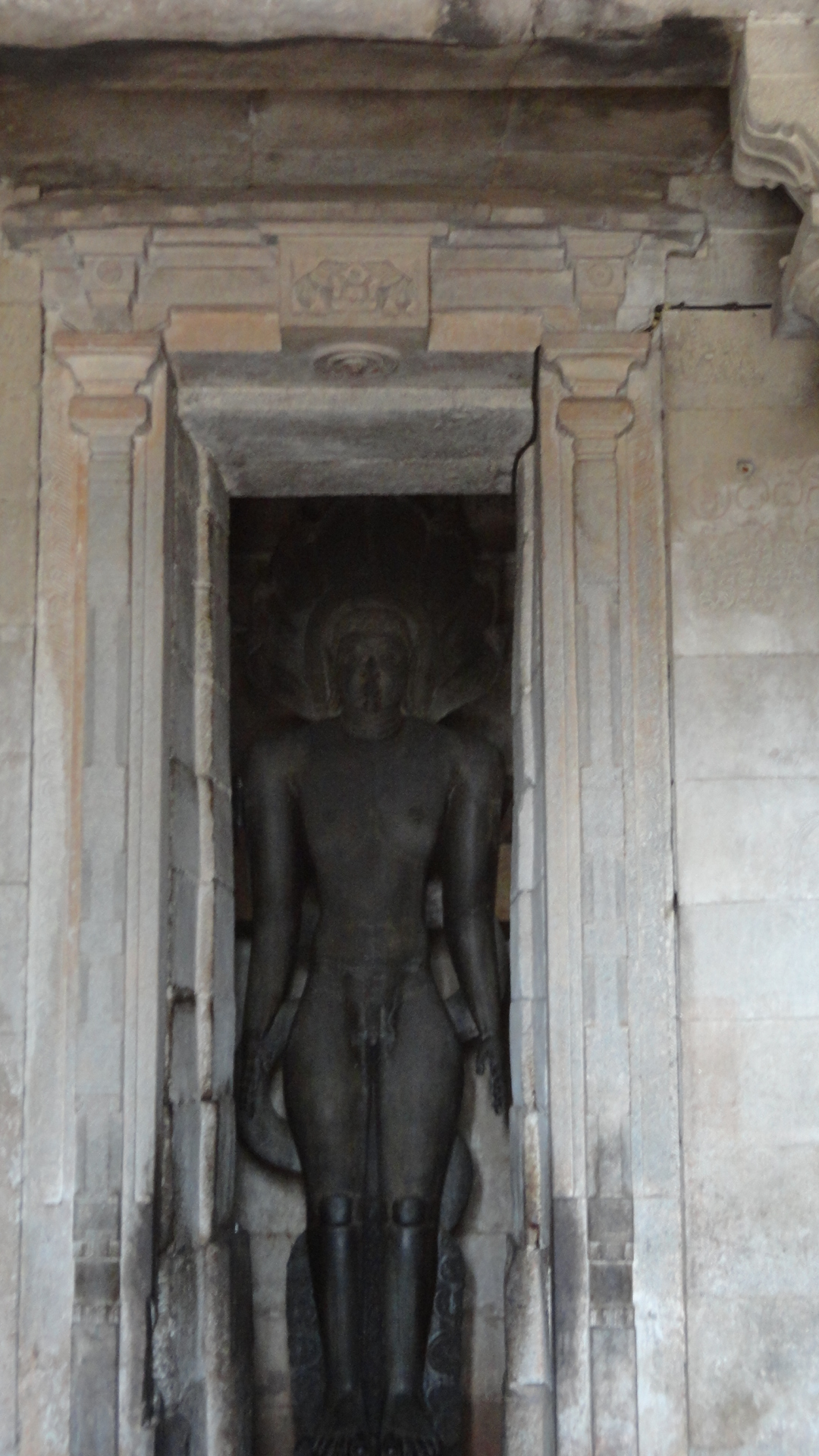
18 feet (5.5 m) statue at Pārśvanātha basadi, Shravanabelgola

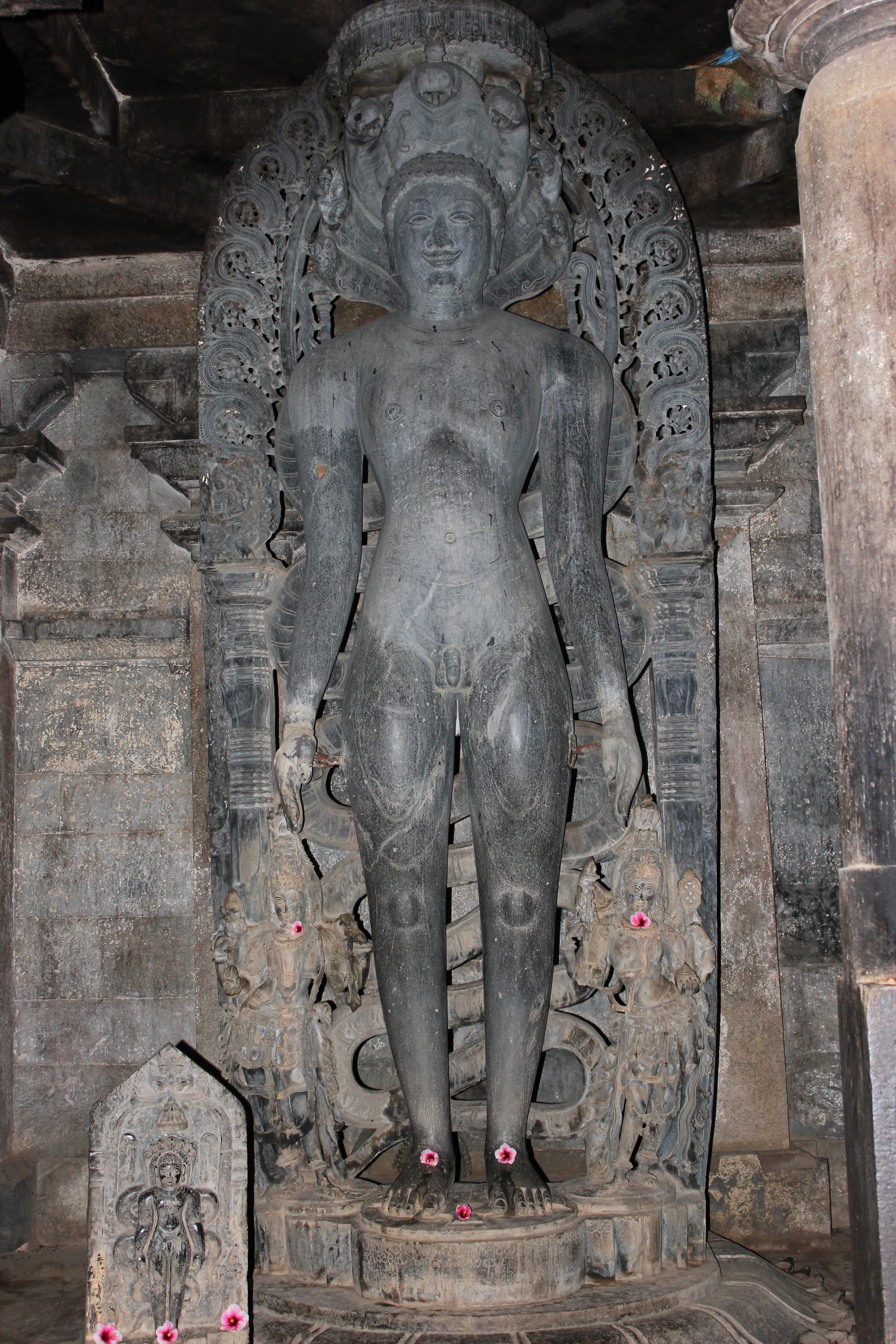
18 feet (5.5 m) statue at Pārśvanātha temple in Halebidu

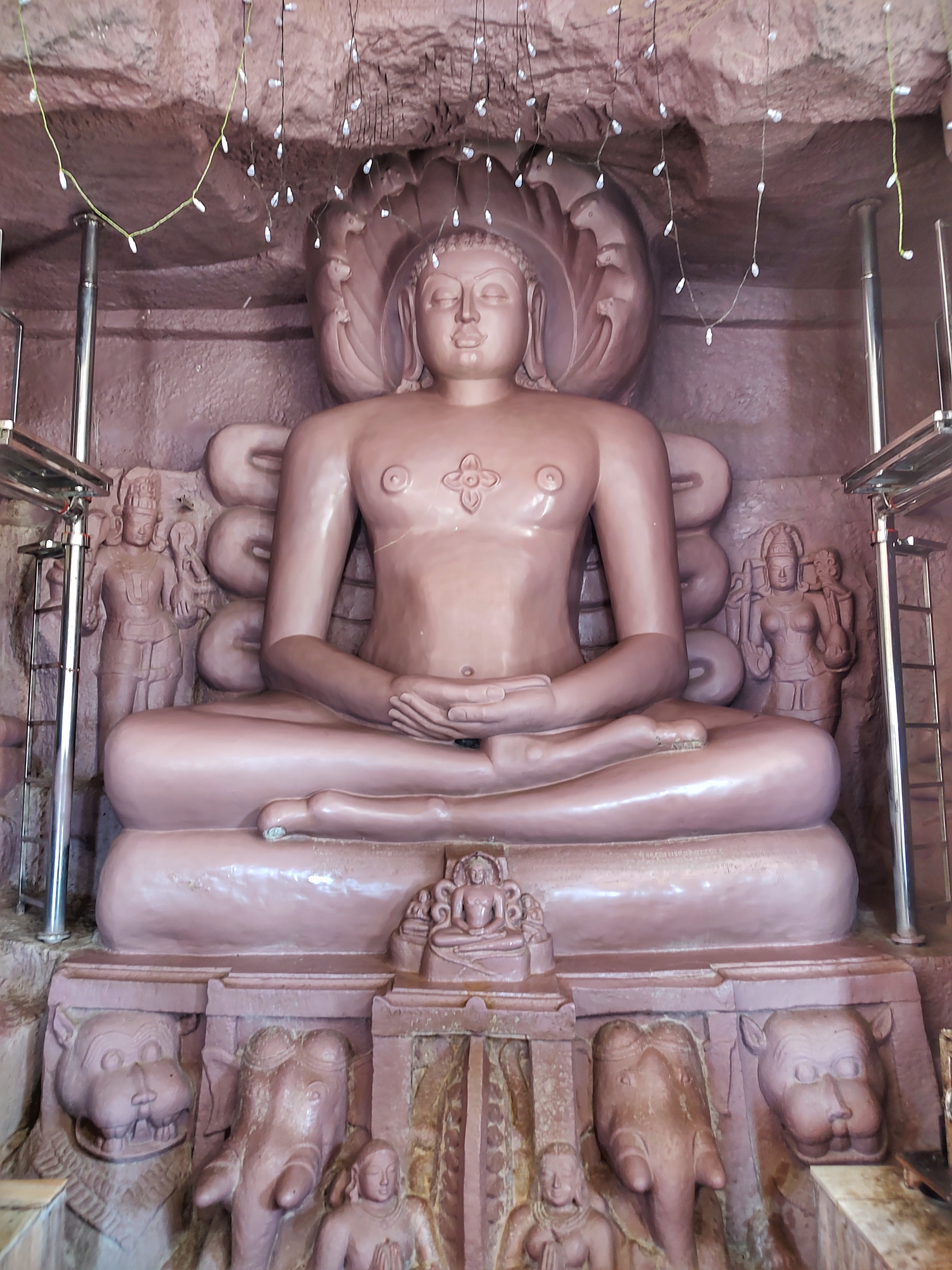
16 feet (4.9 m) rock-carved image inside Ellora Jaina temple, 1234 CE

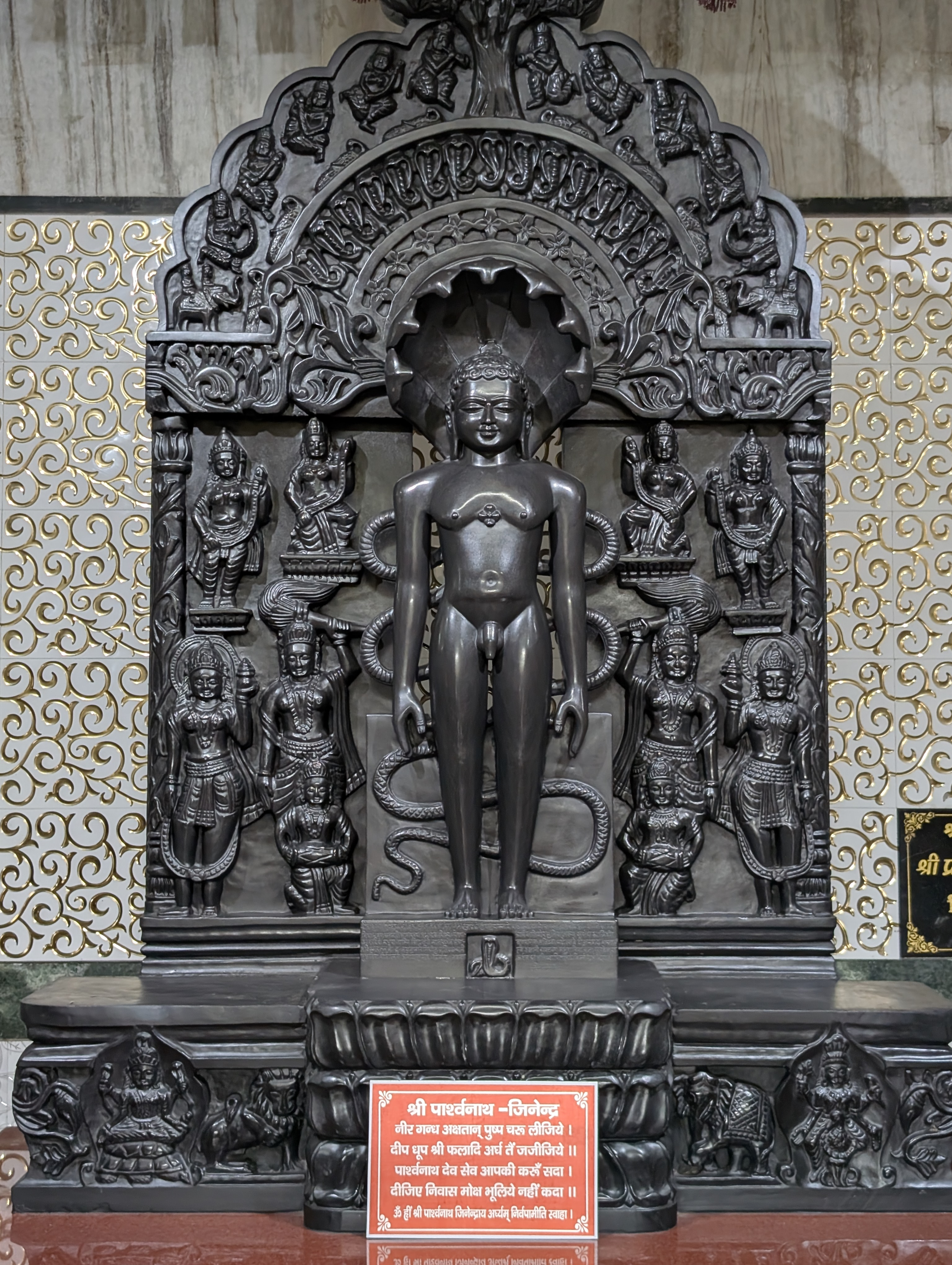

== Temples and pilgrimage ==
Pārśvanātha is one of the five most devotionally revered tīrthaṅkaras, along with Mahāvīra, Rishabhanatha, Neminatha and Shantinatha. Because of his immense popularity, he is widely prayed to for the fulfillment of desires and protection from obstacles. Idols worshipped specifically for this purpose, often accompanied by tantric rites, are revered as wish-fulfilling gem (Chintamani), and a corresponding tantric diagram called the 'Chintamani yantra' is also highly venerated.

=== Shikharji ===
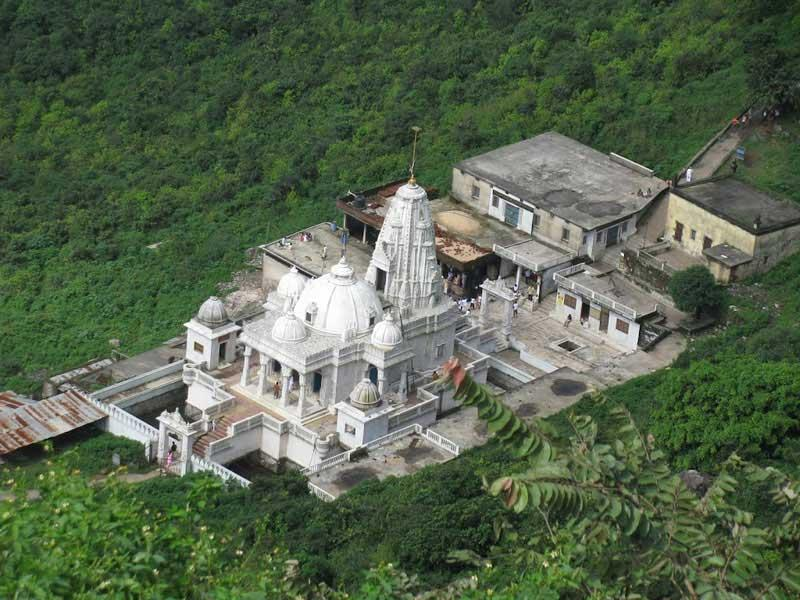
Jal Mandir, Shikharji, Parasnath

Mount Shikharji (also known as Sammed Śikhar, meaning "peak of concentration"), located on Parasnath Hill in the Giridih district of Jharkhand, is universally regarded as the holiest pilgrimage site in Jainism. It is the geographic site where Pārśvanātha, along with 19 other tirthankaras, attained liberation from the cycle of rebirth (moksha).

According to Jain tradition, Pārśvanātha attained nirvana here in 772 BCE on the day of Shravana Shukla Saptami (now celebrated annually as Moksha Saptami). The mountain itself, Parasnath, derives its name directly from him. The highest peak on the mountain houses the shrine (tonk) of Pārśvanātha, marking the ultimate destination for pilgrims making the arduous 27-kilometer trek. The site's extreme antiquity is supported by the Jñātṛdhārmakātha (a 6th-century BCE core Jain text) which references it as a tirtha, and a 13th-century manuscript of the Kalpa Sūtra that visually depicts Pārśvanātha's nirvana at this location. It remains uniquely unifying, as it is managed and heavily venerated by both the Digambara and Śvētāmbara sects.

=== Ahichchhatra Jain temples ===
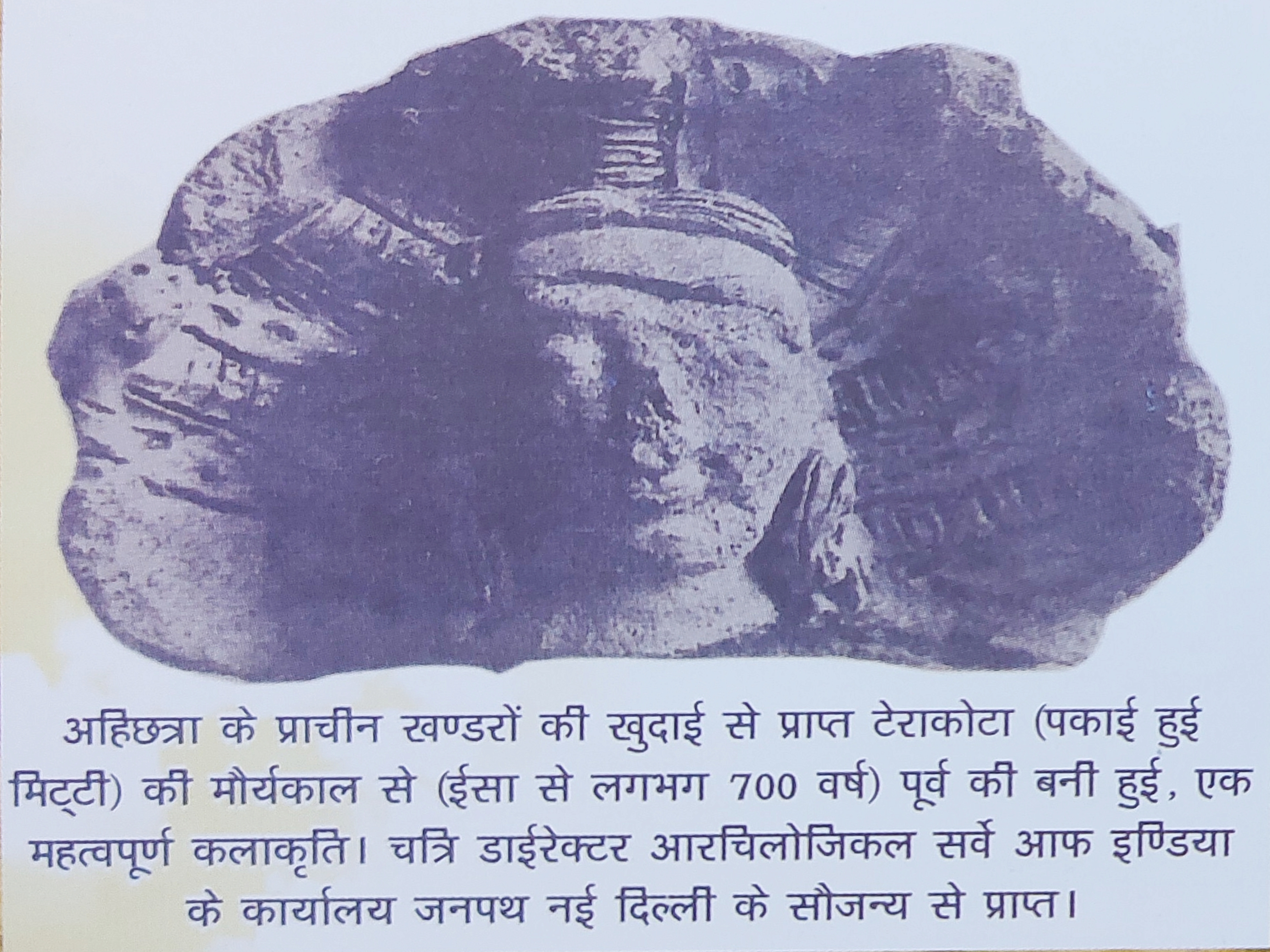
Ahichchhatra excavation - Parshvanatha idol - 7th century BCE

Ahichchhatra, located in the Aonla tehsil of the Bareilly district in Uttar Pradesh, represents a pivotal geographic anchor in Pārśvanātha's ascetic life. While Shikharji is the site of his final liberation, Ahichchhatra is venerated as the exact location where he attained omniscience.

According to Jain texts, while Pārśvanātha was in deep meditation here, an enemy from a past life (identified as his brother Kamath or the deity Meghmali) attempted to break his concentration by conjuring a massive, torrential storm. As the floodwaters rose to Pārśvanātha's neck, the serpent god Dharanendra spread a massive canopy of a thousand hoods over his head to shelter him, while the goddess Padmavati coiled around his body to protect him from the rising water. The site was subsequently named Ahichchhatra (translating to "serpent umbrella") to commemorate this divine intervention. The primary Digambara temple at the site houses an ancient 10th-century idol of Pārśvanātha, popularly revered as "Tikhal wale Baba".

=== Other Significant Regional Temples ===
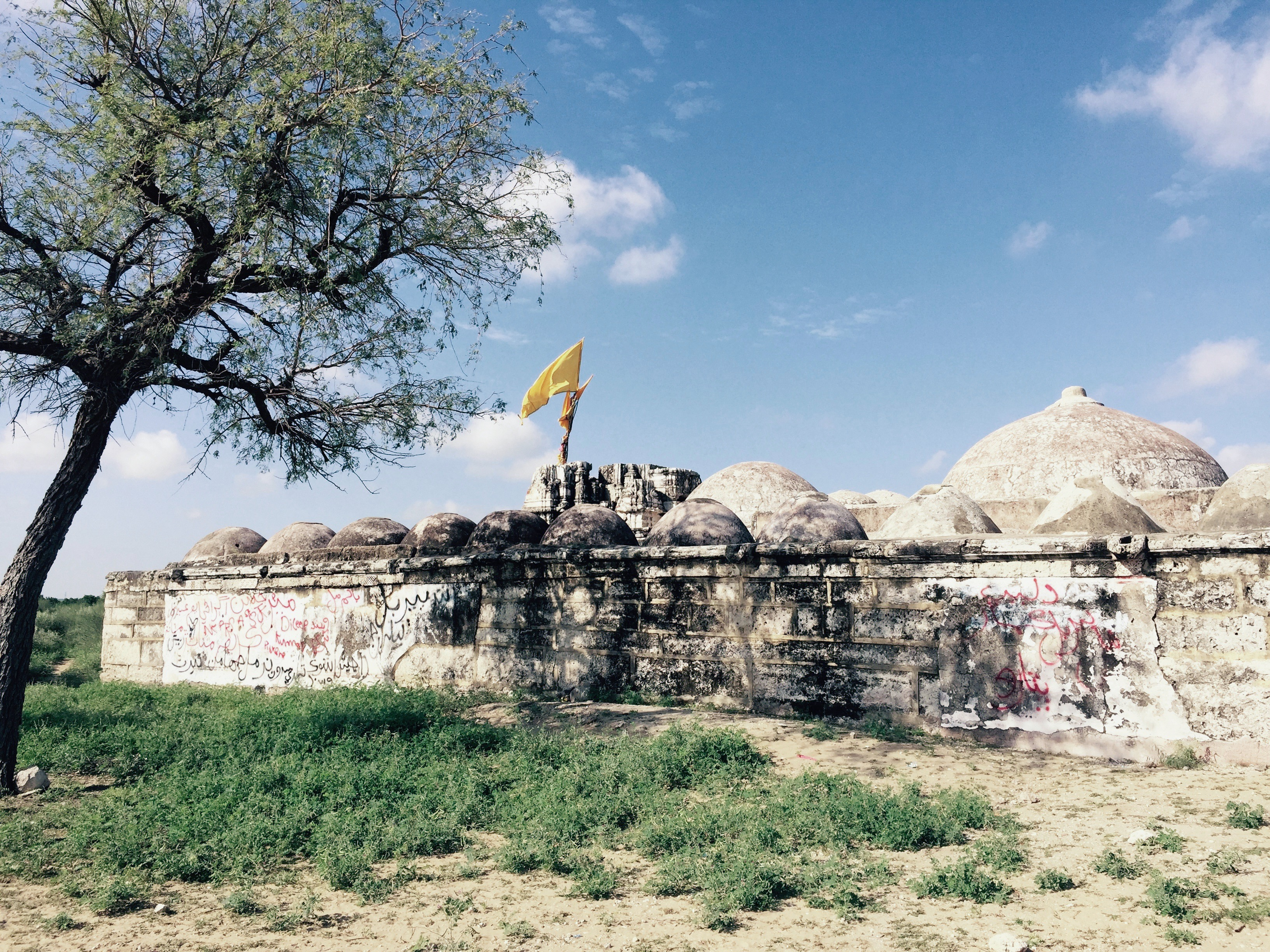
Godiji (Gori) Temple in Tharparkar - tentative list for UNESCO World Heritage

Shankheshwar Parshvanath in northern Gujarat and Mount Shatrunjaya are pilgrimage sites for the Śvētāmbara murtipujaka sect. Replicas of regional Pārśvanātha temples are also worshipped; for example, the Godiji (Gori) Temple in Tharparkar, Sindh (currently on the tentative list for UNESCO World Heritage) has a replica located in Mumbai. According to Jain belief, worshipping these replication idols allows devotees to directly worship the original idol.

In western India, the Mirpur Jain Temple in Rajasthan was constructed in the 9th century during the Solanki dynasty and is the oldest surviving marble monument in the state. Its carvings of Pārśvanātha served as a structural model for the later Dilwara and Ranakpur temples. The 12th-century Bijolia Parshvanath temple features panchayatan architecture and marks the site where Jains believe Pārśvanātha achieved omniscience. Other temples in the region include the Jirawala temple, the 14th-century Andeshwar Parshwanath temple, and the 12th-century Panchasara Jain temple in Patan, Gujarat.

Central and northern Indian sites include Nainagiri (Reshandigiri) in Madhya Pradesh, traditionally believed to be the site of Pārśvanātha's divine preaching hall. The site features a 16-foot tall idol in its Chauvisi Mandir. Pateriaji serves as a Digambara pilgrimage center in the region. In Maharashtra, the Gajpanth Siddha-kshetra features rock-carved cave temples and a seated idol of the tirthankara. Further north in Uttar Pradesh, the Bada Gaon temple enshrines a white marble idol recovered from a well; devotees associate the idol and the well's water with curative properties.

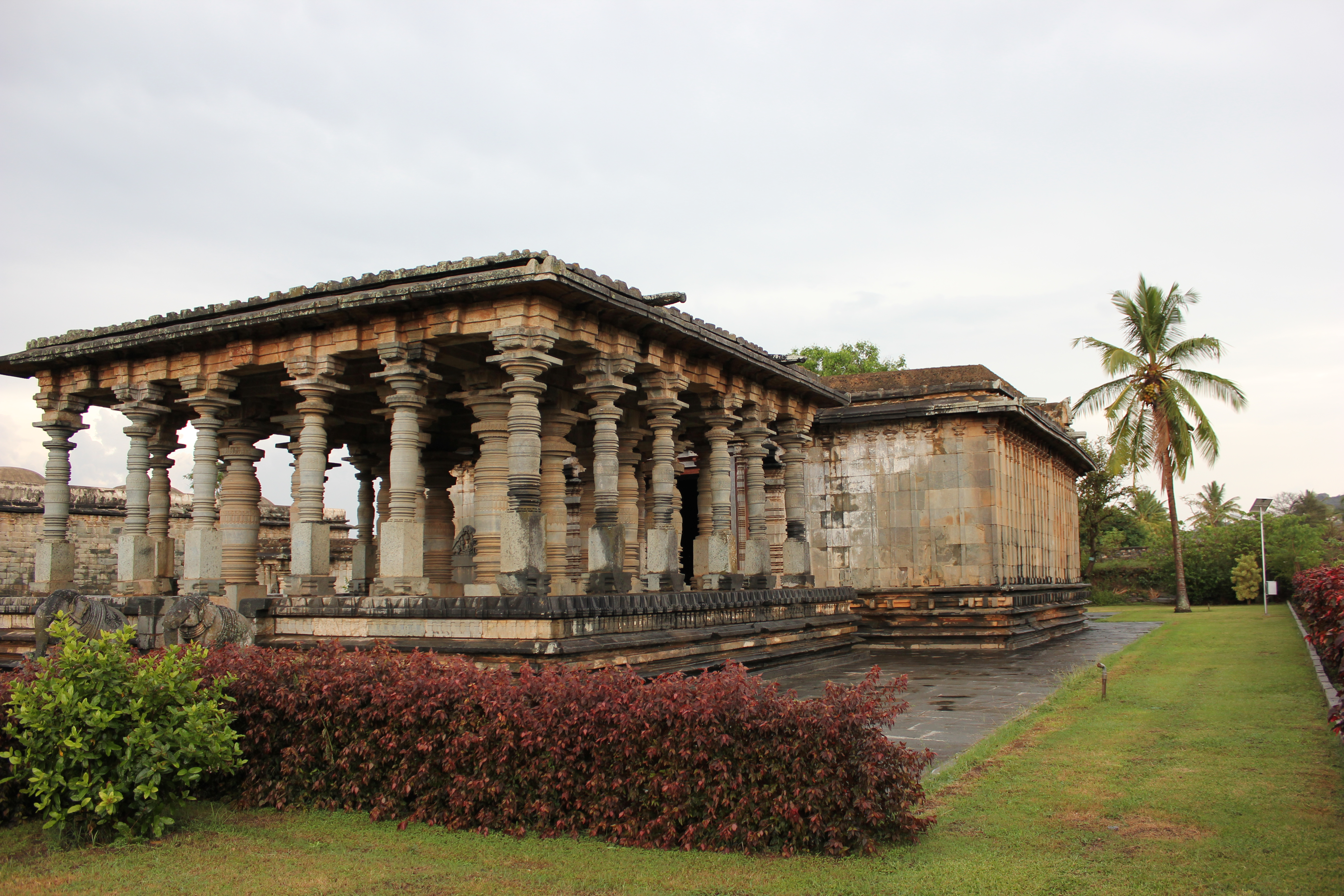
Pārśvanātha basadi at Halebidu, a UNESCO World Heritage Site

The southern Indian states house several Digambara Pārśvanātha complexes. In Karnataka, the Humcha Jain temples were established by the Santara dynasty starting in the 7th century. The state is also home to the Kanakagiri Jain tirth and the 17th-century Kundadri stone temple. Local Jain shrines (basadis) include the Akkana Basadi in Shravanabelagola, built in 1181 CE from soapstone with a seven-hooded serpent canopy over the deity, and the 8th-century Guru Basadi in Moodabidri, which preserves the 12th-century Dhavala manuscripts. In Tamil Nadu, the Mel Sithamur Jain Math serves as a religious center for the Tamil Jain community, while the 9th-century Kallil Temple in Kerala preserves rock-carved images of Pārśvanātha. Aihole Jain cave dates back to the first half of the 6th century CE. The temple is one of the principal components of the Aihole group included in India's UNESCO Tentative List for World Heritage Site.

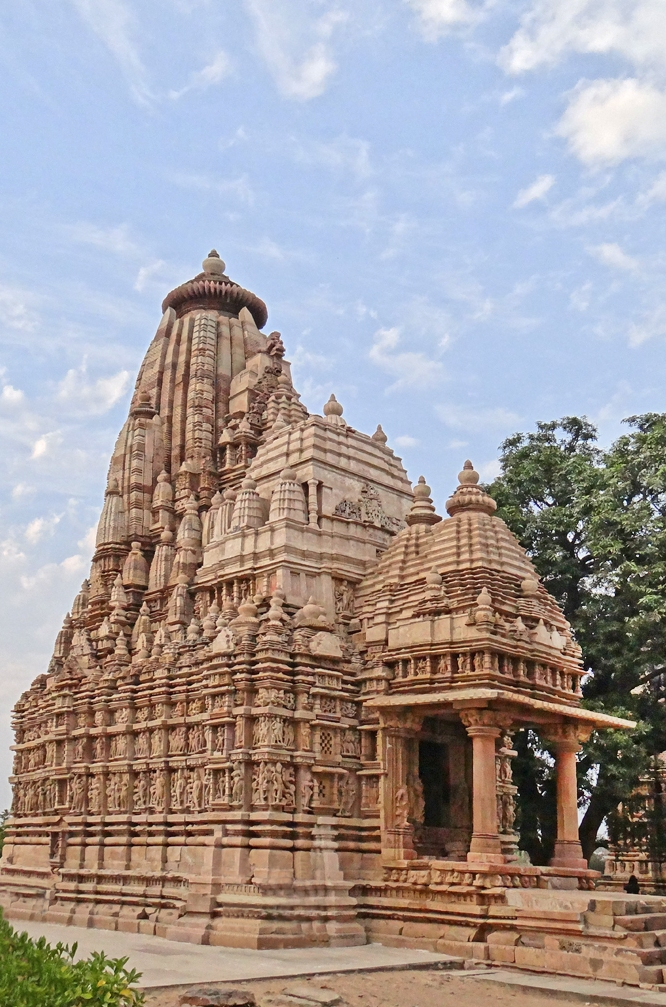
Pārśvanātha temple, Khajuraho, UNESCO World Heritage Site

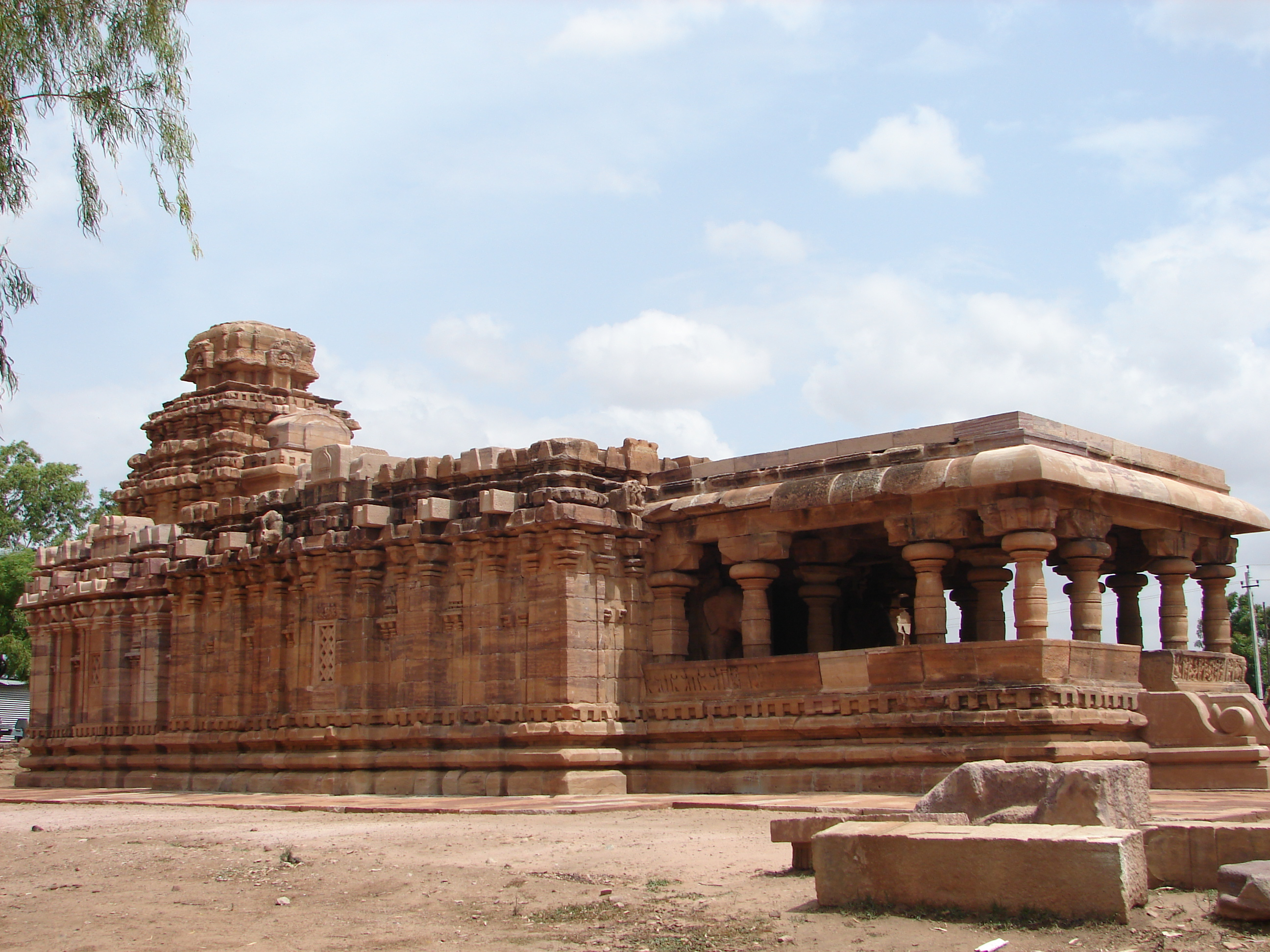
Jain Narayana Temple, Pattadakal, UNESCO World Heritage Site

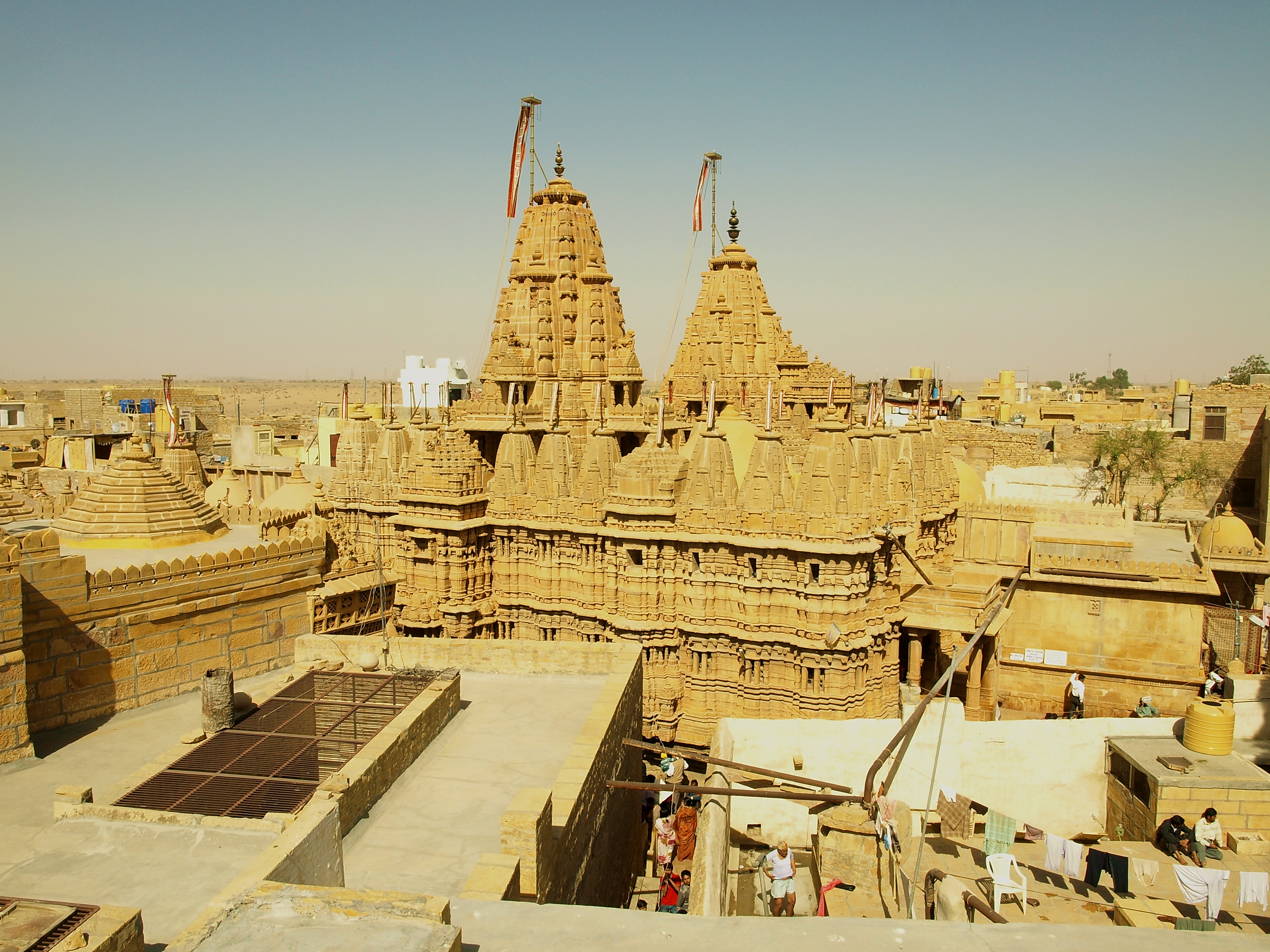
Parshavanth temple, Jaisalmer Fort, UNESCO World Heritage Site as part of Hill Forts of Rajasthan

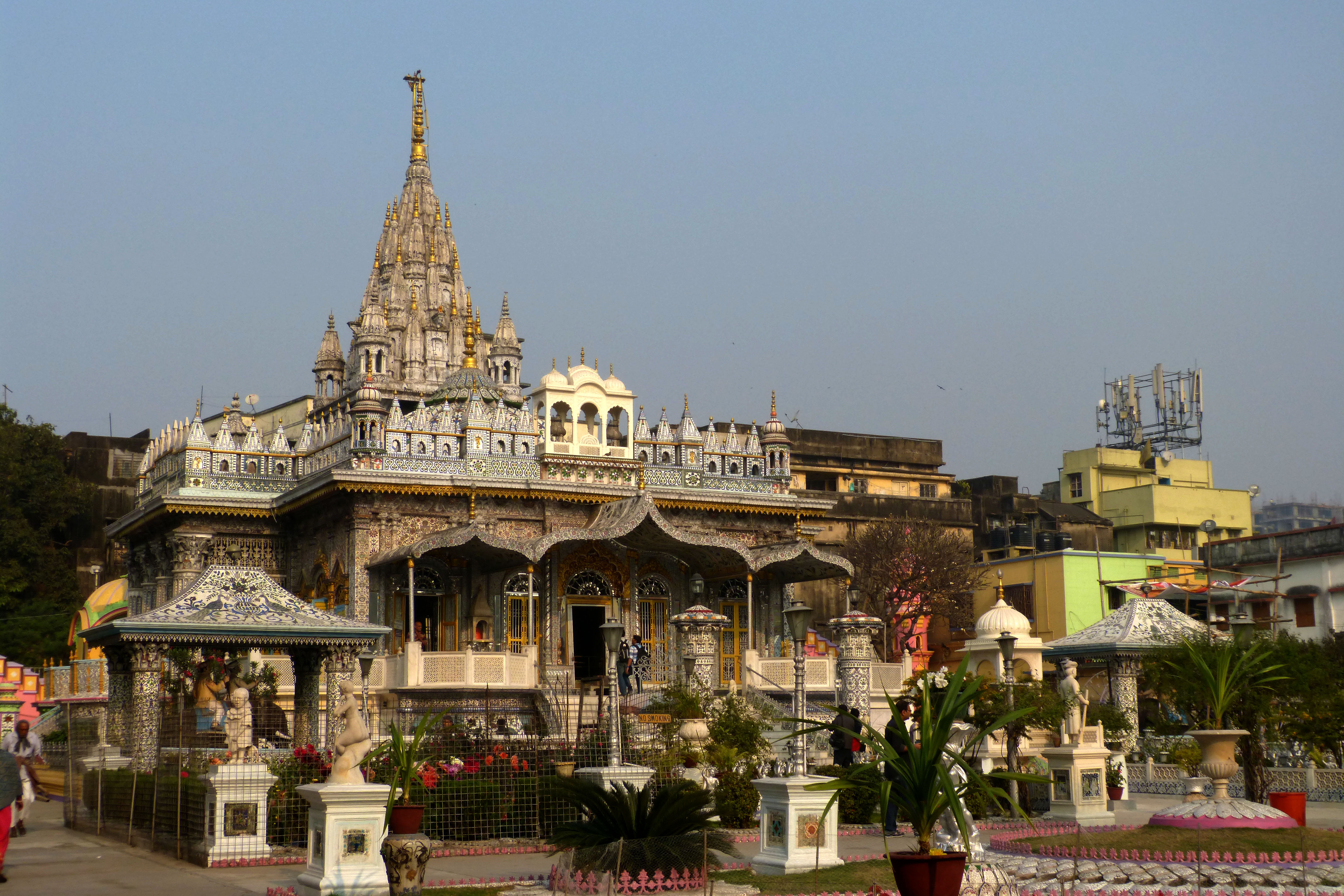
Calcutta Jaina Temple

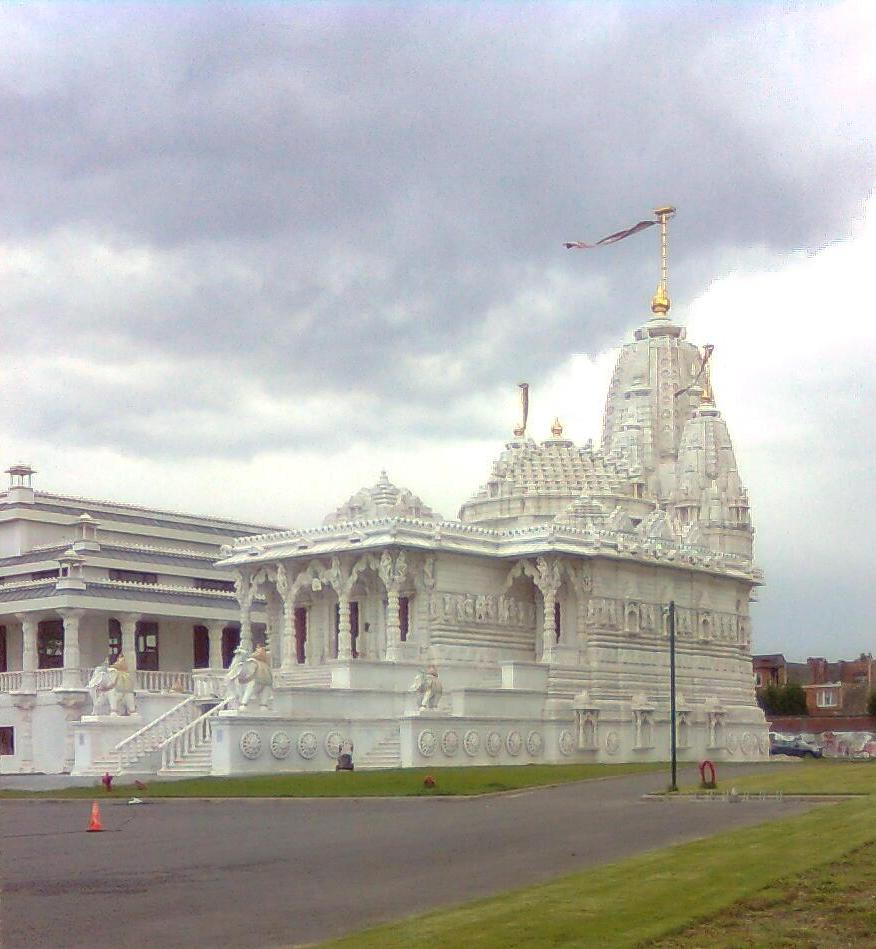
Antwerp Jaina Temple, Belgium

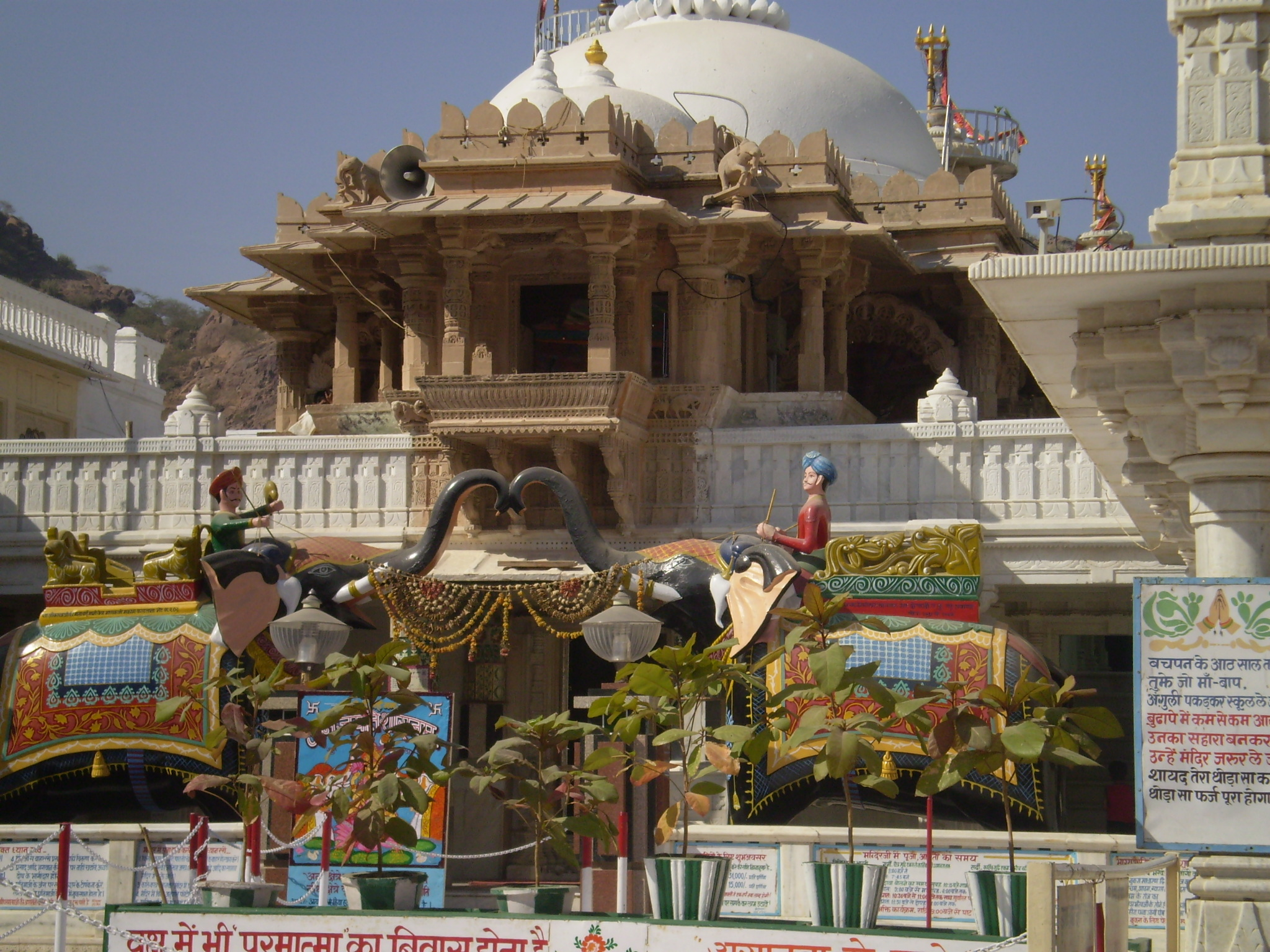
Shri Nakodaji

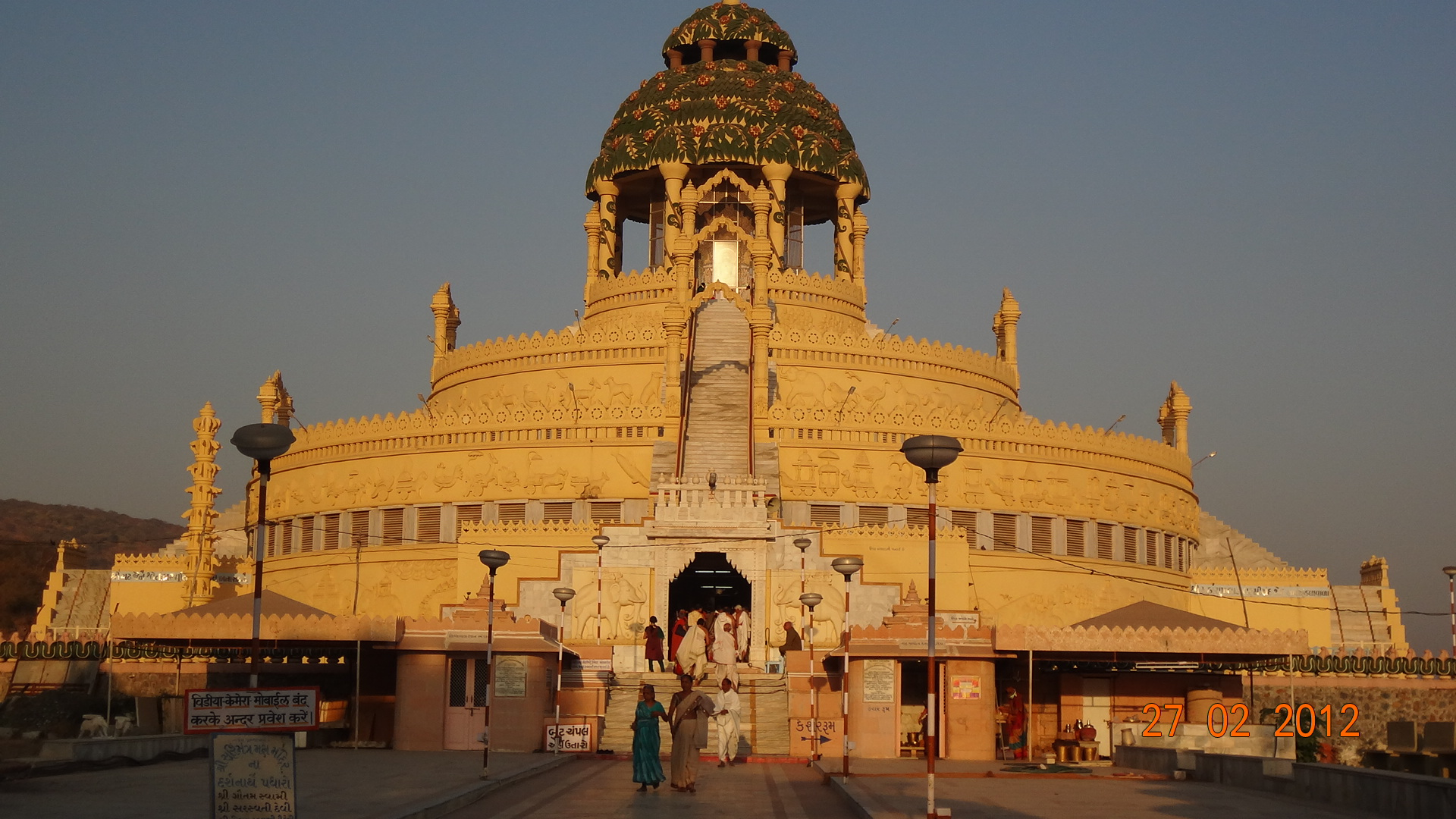
Samovsaran Mandir, Palitana

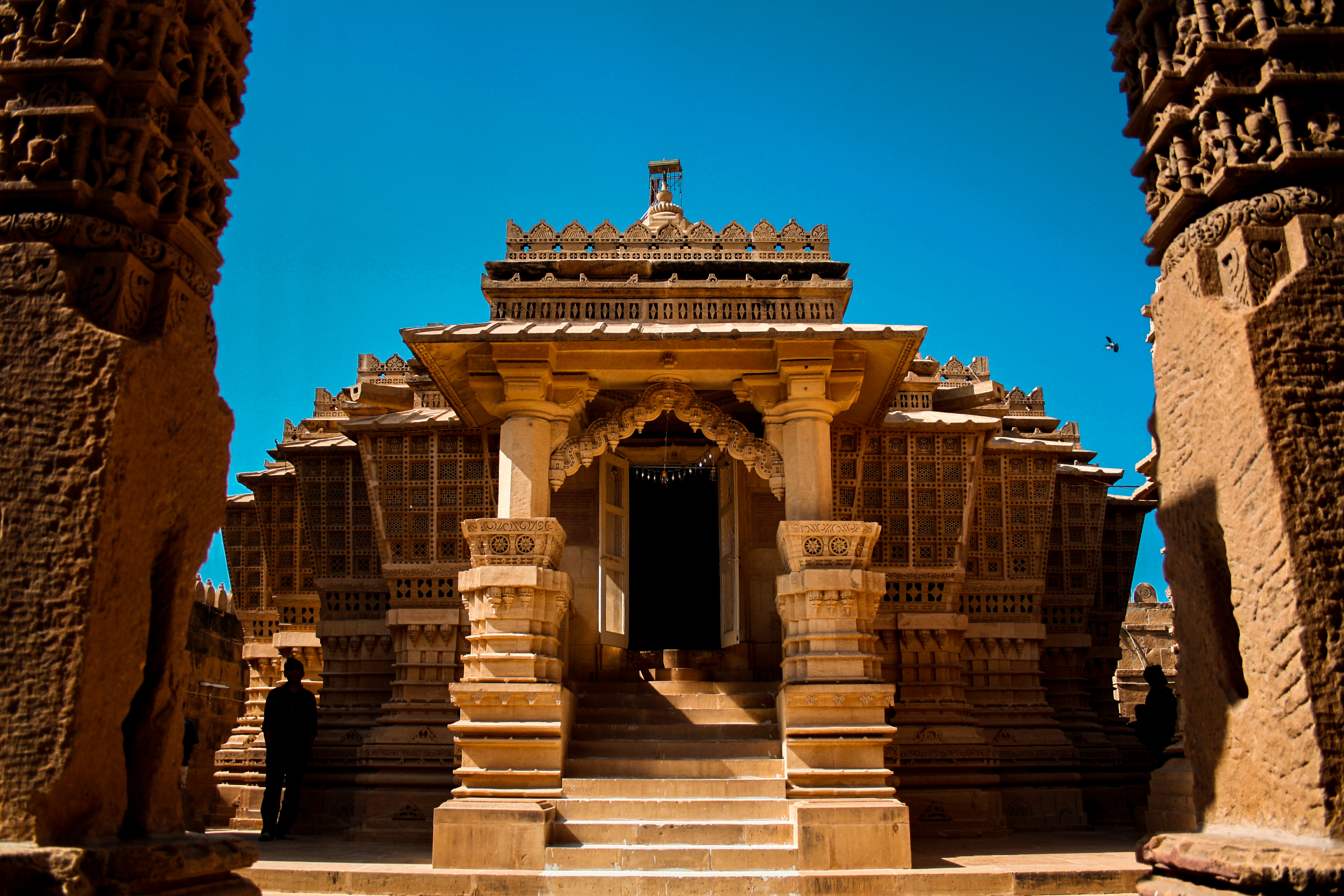
Lodhurva Jaina temple

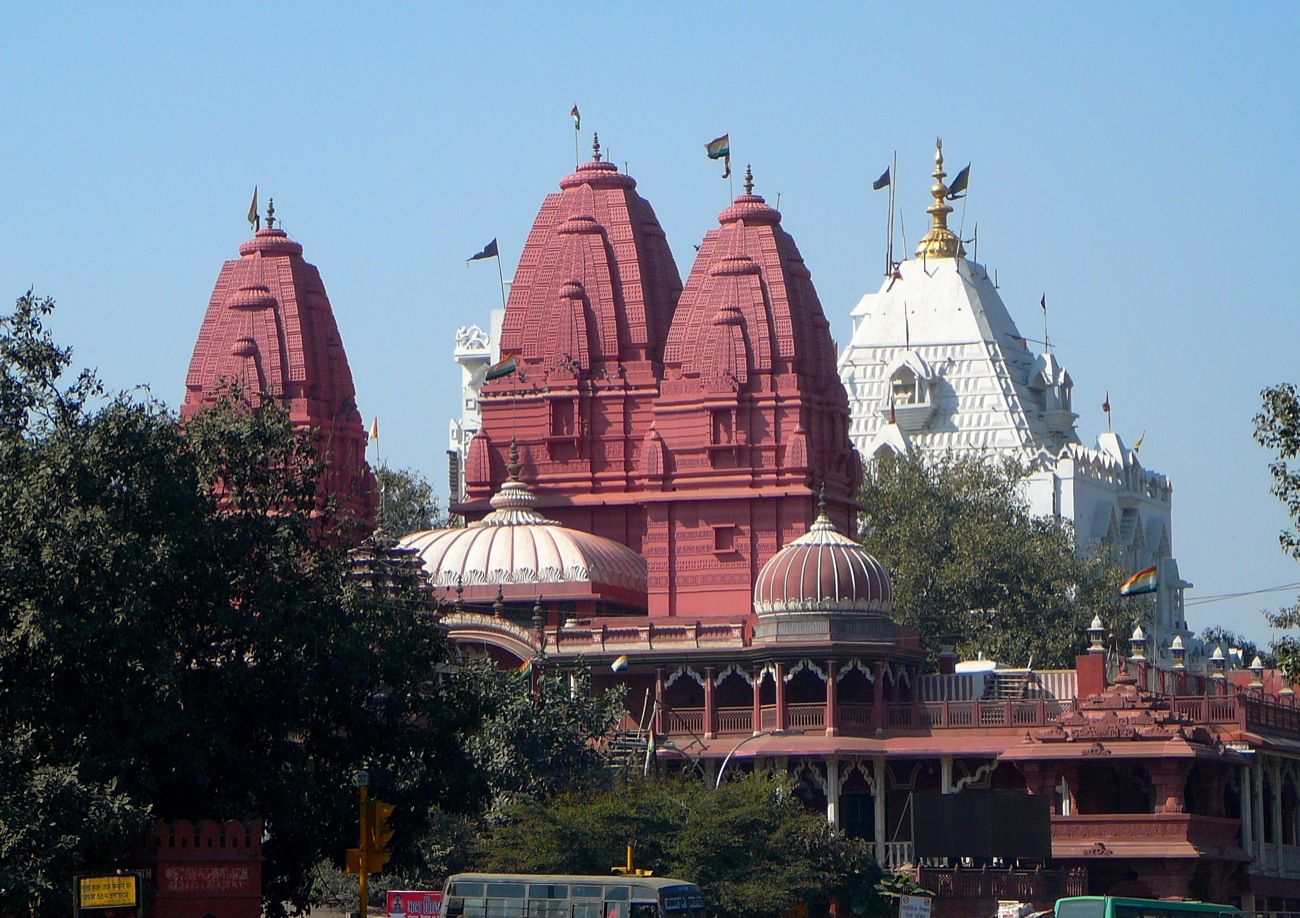
Lal Mandir

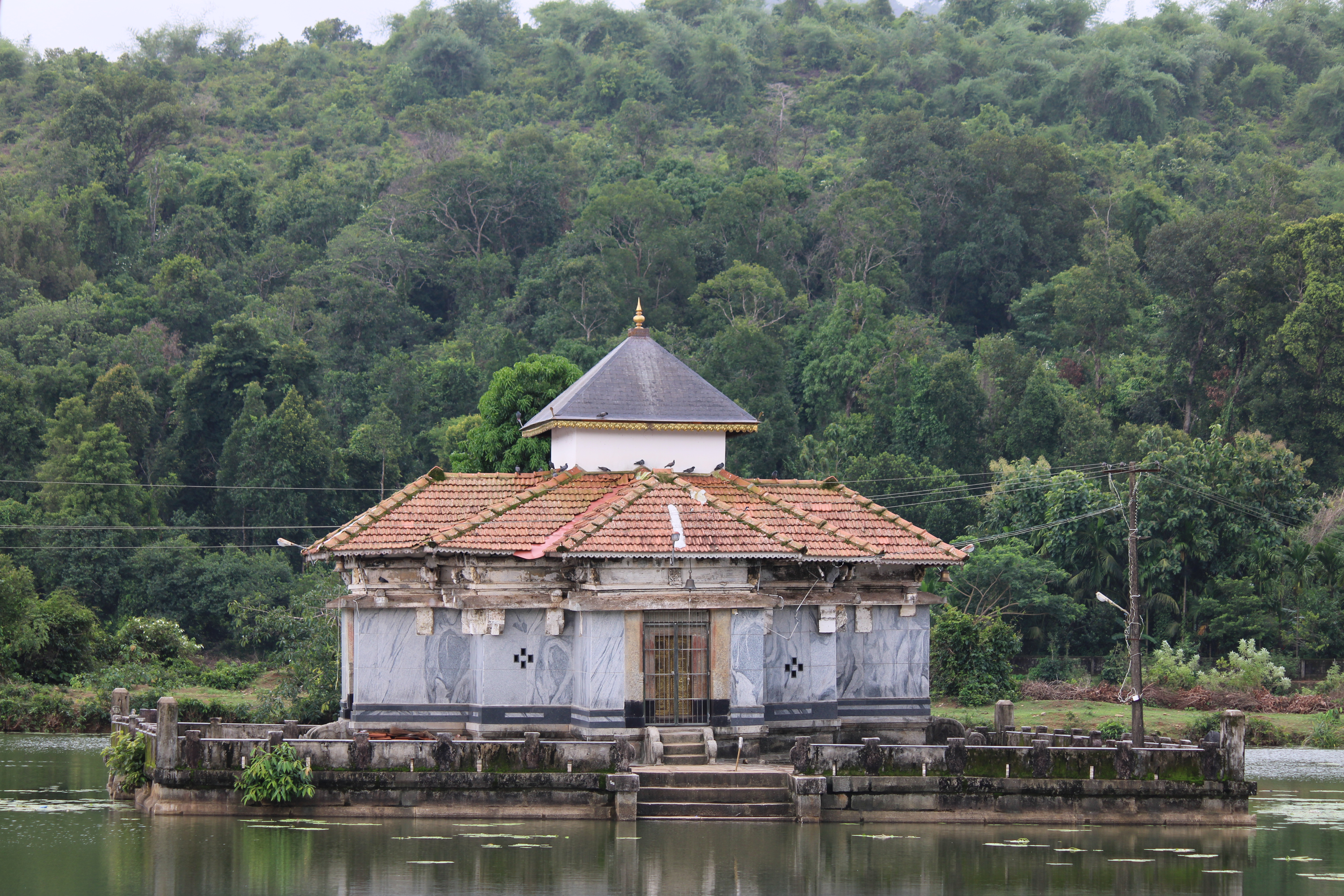
Kere Basadi

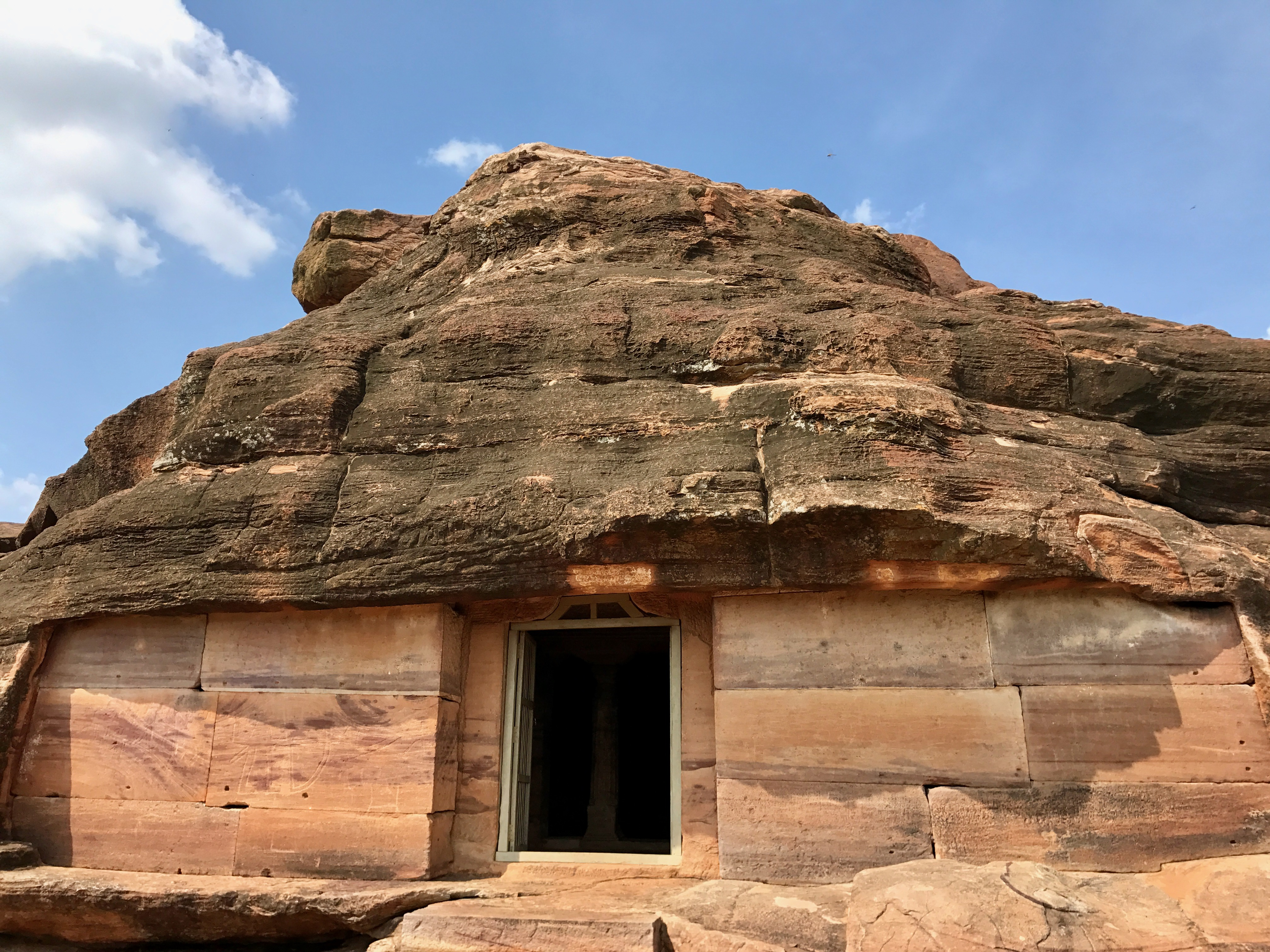
Aihole Jain cave, 6th century CE, Tentative List for World Heritage Site

== See also ==
- Neminatha — Pārśvanātha’s predecessor
- Mahāvīra — Pārśvanātha’s successor

== Sources ==
=== Books ===
- Basham, A.L. (1951). History and Doctrines of the Ājīvikas: A Vanished Indian Religion. Jainism Series. Motilal Banarsidass. ISBN 978-81-208-1204-8.
- Bhandarkar, Devadatta Ramakrishna (1981). Chhabra, Bahadur Chand (ed.). Corpus Inscriptionum Indicarum (Revised) (PDF). Vol. 3. Archaeological Survey of India.
- Bhattacharya, B. C. (1974) [1939]. The Jain Iconography (PDF) (2nd ed.). Motilal Banarsidass.
- Bhattacharya, Sabyasachi (2011). Approaches to History: Essays in Indian Historiography. Primus Books. ISBN 9789380607177.
- Brown, Robert L. (1991). Ganesh: Studies of an Asian God. State University of New York Press. ISBN 978-0-7914-0656-4.
- Chapple, Christopher K (2011). Andrew R. Murphy (ed.). The Blackwell Companion to Religion and Violence. John Wiley. ISBN 978-1-4443-9573-0.
- Smith, Vincent A. (1901). Jain Stupa and other antiquitie (PDF). Vol. 20. Allahabad: Superintendent, Government Press.
- Cort, John E. (2001a). Jains in the World: Religious Values and Ideology in India. Oxford University Press. ISBN 978-0-19-803037-9.
- Cort, John E. (2010). Framing the Jina: Narratives of Icons and Idols in Jain History. Oxford University Press. ISBN 978-0-19-538502-1.
- Coulter, Charles Russell (2013). Encyclopedia of Ancient Deities. Routledge. ISBN 978-1-135-96390-3.
- Dalal, Roshen (2010) [2006]. The Religions of India: A Concise Guide to Nine Major Faiths. Penguin books. ISBN 978-0-14-341517-6.
- Dangi, Vivek (2017), Jainism in Haryana: An Archaeological Perspective (PDF), vol. 5, Heritage: Journal of Multidisciplinary Studies in Archaeology
- Danielou, Alain (1971), L'Histoire de l'Inde Translated from French by Kenneth Hurry, Inner Traditions/Bear, ISBN 978-0-89281-923-2
- Datta, Amaresh (1988). Encyclopaedia of Indian Literature: Devraj to Jyoti. Vol. 2. Sahitya Akademi. ISBN 9788126011940.
- Dehejia, Vidya (2009). The Body Adorned: Sacred and Profane in Indian Art. Columbia University Press. ISBN 9780231512664.
- Dhaky, M.A. (1997). Arhat Pārśva and Dharaṇendra Nexus. Bhogilal Leharchand Institute of Indology, Delhi.
- Doniger, Wendy, ed. (1999). Encyclopedia of World Religions. Merriam-Webster. ISBN 978-0-87779-044-0.
- Dundas, Paul (2002) [1992]. The Jains (Second ed.). Routledge. ISBN 978-0-415-26605-5.
- Ekambaranathan, A. (1996), Jaina Iconography, Tamil Nadu: Shri Ramana Publications
- Finegan, Jack (1952), The archeology of world religions, Princeton University Press
- Fisher, Mary Pat (1997). Living Religions: An Encyclopedia of the World's Faiths. London: I.B.Tauris. ISBN 978-1-86064-148-0.
- Foekema, Gerard (1996), A Complete Guide to Hoysaḷa Temples, Abhinav Publications
- Ghatage, A.M. (1951), "Jainism", in Majumdar, R.C.; Pusalker, A.D. (eds.), The Age of Imperial Unity, Bombay
- Handa, Devendra (2002), Jaina Bronzes From Hansi, Aryan Books International
- Heehs, Peter (2002). Indian Religions: A Historical Reader of Spiritual Expression and Experience. New York University Press. ISBN 978-0-8147-3650-0.
- Hoiberg, Dale (2000). Students' Britannica India, Volume 4: Miraj to Shastri. Popular Prakashan. ISBN 978-0-85229-760-5.
- Jacobi, Hermann (1964). Max Muller (The Sacred Books of the East Series, Volume XXII) (ed.). Jaina Sutras (Translation). Motilal Banarsidass (Original: Oxford University Press).
- Jacobi, Hermann (1884). Müller, F. Max (ed.). Kalpa Sutra, Jain Sutras Part I, Sacred Books of the East. Vol. 22. Oxford: The Clarendon Press.
- Jain, Champat Rai (1939). The Change of Heart.
- Jain, Kailash Chand (1991). Lord Mahāvīra and His Times. Motilal Banarsidass. ISBN 978-81-208-0805-8.
- Jain, Kajri (2021), Gods in the Time of Democracy, Duke University Press
- Jain, Jyotindra; Fischer, Eberhard (1978). Jain Iconography. Vol. 12. Brill. ISBN 978-90-04-05259-8.
- Jaini, Padmanabh S. (1998) [1979]. The Jaina Path of Purification. Delhi: Motilal Banarsidass. ISBN 978-81-208-1578-0.
- Jaini, Padmanabh S. (2001). Collected Papers on Buddhist Studies. Motilal Banarsidass. ISBN 978-81-208-1776-0.
- Jaini, Padmanabh S., ed. (2000). Collected Papers On Jaina Studies (First ed.). Delhi: Motilal Banarsidass. ISBN 978-81-208-1691-6.
- Jones, Constance; Ryan, James D. (2006), Encyclopedia of Hinduism (PDF), Infobase Publishing, ISBN 978-0-8160-7564-5
- Kenoyer, Jonathan M.; Heuston, Kimberley Burton (2005). The Ancient South Asian World. Oxford University Press. ISBN 978-0-19-522243-2.
- Kothary, Piyush C. (2015). Profile in Silence:: Achieving Dreams Against All Odds. Xlibris. ISBN 9781514430316.
- Kapoor, Subodh (2002). Encyclopaedia of Ancient Indian Geography. Vol. 1 (Second ed.). New Delhi: Cosmo Publication. ISBN 9788177552980.
- Kuiper, Kathleen (2010). The Culture of India. Understanding India. Britannica Educational Publishing. ISBN 978-1-61530-203-1.
- Long, Jeffery D. (2009). Jainism: An Introduction. I. B. Tauris. ISBN 978-1-84511-625-5.
- Long, Jeffery D. (2020). Historical Dictionary of Hinduism. Bloomsbury Publishing USA. ISBN 979-8-8818-7623-4.
- Mansukhani, Gobind Singh (1993). Hymns from the Dasam Granth. Hemkunt Press. ISBN 9788170101802.
- Martin, Nancy M.; Runzo, Joseph (2001). Ethics in the World Religions. Oneworld Publications. ISBN 978-1-85168-247-8.
- Menon, A. Sreedhara (1967), A Survey of Kerala History, Sahitya Pravarthaka Co-operative Society
- Moore, Albert C. (1977). Iconography of Religions: An Introduction. Fortress Press. ISBN 978-0-8006-0488-2.
- Orsini, Francesca; Schofield, Katherine Butler (2015). Tellings and Texts: Music, Literature and Performance in North India. Open Book Publishers. ISBN 9781783741021.
- Pal, Pratapaditya (1995). Ganesh, the Benevolent. Marg Publications. ISBN 978-81-85026-31-2.
- Pal, Pratapaditya; Huyler, Stephen P.; Cort, John E. (2016). Puja and Piety: Hindu, Jain, and Buddhist Art from the Indian Subcontinent. University of California Press. ISBN 978-0-520-28847-8.
- Price, Joan (2010). Sacred Scriptures of the World Religions: An Introduction. Bloomsbury Academic. ISBN 978-0-8264-2354-2.
- Quintanilla, Sonya Rhie (2007), History of Early Stone Sculpture at Mathura: Ca. 150 BCE - 100 CE, Brill Publishers, ISBN 9789004155374
- Rapson, E. J. (1935), The Cambridge History of India, Cambridge University Press
- Reddy, Pedarapu Chenna (2022). Nagabharana: Recent Trends in Jainism Studies. Blue Rose Publishers. ISBN 978-93-56114-46-3.
- Sangave, Vilas Adinath (1981). The Sacred Shravanabelagola: A Socio-Religious Study. Bharatiya Jnanpith.
- Sangave, Vilas Adinath (2001). Facets of Jainology: Selected Research Papers on Jain Society, Religion, and Culture. Mumbai: Popular Prakashan. ISBN 978-81-7154-839-2.
- Sarasvati, Swami Dayananda (1970). An English translation of the Satyarth Prakash. Swami Dayananda Sarasvati.
- Schubring, Walther (1964), Jinismus, in: Die Religionen Indiens, vol. 3, Stuttgart
- Kumar, Sehdev (2001), A Thousand Petalled Lotus: Jain Temples of Rajasthan: Architecture & Iconography, Abhinav Publications, ISBN 978-81-7017-348-9
- Shah, Umakant Premanand (1987). Jaina-rūpa-maṇḍana: Jaina iconography. Abhinav Publications. ISBN 978-81-7017-208-6.
- Shah, Natubhai (2004), Jainism: The World of Conquerors, vol. 1, Motilal Banarsidass, ISBN 9788120819382
- Shah, Viraj (2008). Jaina Rock Cut Caves in Western India: With Special Reference to Maharashtra. Vol. 1. New Delhi: Agam Kala Prakashan. ISBN 978-81-7320-078-6.
- Singh, Rana (2009), Banaras: Making of India's Heritage City, Planet Earth & Cultural Understanding, Cambridge Scholars Publishing, ISBN 9781443815796
- Tandon, O. P. (1986). Jaina Shrines in India. Publications Division Ministry of Information & Broadcasting. ISBN 978-81-230-2454-7.
- The Asiatic Society (1892). Proceeding of the Asiatic Society of Bengal. Baptist Misson Press.
- Thomas, Edward Joseph (1949). The Life of Buddha as Legend and History. Dover books on Western philosophy. Dover Publications. ISBN 978-0-486-41132-3.
- Titze, Kurt; Bruhn, Klaus (1998). Jainism: A Pictorial Guide to the Religion of Non-Violence (2 ed.). Motilal Banarsidass. ISBN 978-81-208-1534-6.
- Tiwari, Maruti Nandan Prasad (1989). Ambika in Jaina Art and Literature. Bharatiya Jnanpith.
- Upadhye, Dr. A. N. (2000). Mahāvīra His Times and His philosophy of life. Bharatiya Jnanpith.
- von Glasenapp, Helmuth (1999). Jainism: An Indian Religion of Salvation [Der Jainismus: Eine Indische Erlosungsreligion]. Shridhar B. Shrotri (trans.). Delhi: Motilal Banarsidass. ISBN 978-81-208-1376-2.
- Vyas, Dr. R. T., ed. (1995). Studies in Jaina Art and Iconography and Allied Subjects. The Director, Oriental Institute, on behalf of the Registrar, M.S. University of Baroda, Vadodara. ISBN 81-7017-316-7.
- Wiley, Kristi L. (2009) [1949]. The A to Z of Jainism. Vol. 38. Scarecrow Press. ISBN 978-0-8108-6337-8.
- Williams, Paul, ed. (2005). Buddhism: Critical Concepts in Religious Studies. Routledge. ISBN 978-0-415-33226-2.
- Zimmer, Heinrich (1953) [April 1952]. Campbell, Joseph (ed.). Philosophies Of India. London: Routledge & Kegan Paul Ltd. ISBN 978-81-208-0739-6.
- Zimmer, Heinrich (1969) [1951]. Campbell, Joseph (ed.). Philosophies Of India. Princeton, New Jersey: Princeton University Press.
- Suriji, Acharya Kalyanbodhi (2013). Sankhesvara Stotram. Multy Graphics.

=== More books ===
- Clines, Gregory M. (2017), "Pārśvanātha (Jainism)", in Sarao, K. T. S.; Long, Jeffery D. (eds.), Buddhism and Jainism, Encyclopedia of Indian Religions, Netherlands: Springer Publishing, ISBN 978-94-024-0851-5
- Deo, S. B. (1954). "The History of Jaina Monachism from Inscriptions and Literature". Bulletin of the Deccan College Research Institute. 16 (1/4). Deccan College Post-Graduate and Research Institute: 1–608. JSTOR 42929542. OCLC 555200984.
- Gough, Ellen (9 March 2020). "Situating Pārśva's Biography in Varanasi". Religions. 11 (3). MDPI AG: 117. doi:10.3390/rel11030117. ISSN 2077-1444.
- Kelting, M. Whitney (2007). "Candanbala's Tears: Recovering the Emotional Life of Jainism". Numen. 54 (2): 109–37. doi:10.1163/156852707X184989. JSTOR 27643255.
- Quintanilla, Sonya Rhie (2000). "Āyāgapaṭas: Characteristics, Symbolism, and Chronology". Artibus Asiae. 60 (1): 79–137. doi:10.2307/3249941. JSTOR 3249941.
- Vajpeyi, Raghavendra (1983). "Skandagupta's Bhitari Grant To Visnu-sarngin And Bhitari Excavations". Proceedings of the Indian History Congress. 44. Indian History Congress: 70–78. JSTOR 44139823.
- Parshvanatha: Jaina Saint, in Encyclopaedia Britannica, Encyclopædia Britannica, 2009
- "Vahelna – Jain temple". Government of Uttar Pradesh.
- Uttar Pradesh Tourism. "Ahicchatra" (PDF). Uttar Pradesh Tourism. Archived from the original (PDF) on 25 May 2022.
- "100-feet Parshwanath idol gets Vadodara civic body nod". The Times of India. 27 July 2019.
