= Indon Ki Dhani =

Village in Rajasthan, India

- Village
- Location in Rajasthan
- Coordinates: 26.752056°N 72.788587°E
- Country: India
- State: Rajasthan
- District: Jodhpur
- Elevation: 329 m (1,079 ft)

Population
  - Total: 876

Indon Ki Dhani is a village located in the Jodhpur District of Rajasthan, India. It is situated in the Osian Tehsil.

== Location ==
Indon Ki Dhani is situated at an altitude of 329 meters above sea level.

=== Connectivity ===
Indon Ki Dhani is served by both public and private bus services within the village. The nearest railway stations are Bhikamkor Railway Station (7.7 km away) and Osiyan Railway Station (14 km away).

=== Nearby cities and villages ===
The village is surrounded by cities such as Jodhpur, Pipar City, Siana, and Nagaur. Nearby villages include Banakabas, Khetasar, Cherai, Ekalkhori, and Osian.

=== Local administration ===
The village is governed by the Indon Ki Dhani Gram Panchayat. The current Sarpanch is Menka Devi, and the Secretary is Mohanlal Vishnoi.

=== Healthcare and education ===
Indon Ki Dhani has primary health centers and schools, including GSS Indon Ki Dhani and GUPS Kavo Ki Dhani. Nearby colleges include Govt College Osian, Bbhagwati College Khetasar, Dgp Dhogdi Memorial, and Tanwar Group Of Institute.

=== Weather ===
The current temperature in Indon Ki Dhani is 31.4 °C with clear sky conditions. The humidity is 24%, and the wind speed is 3.72 mt/sec towards S.
