= Sachiya Mata Temple =

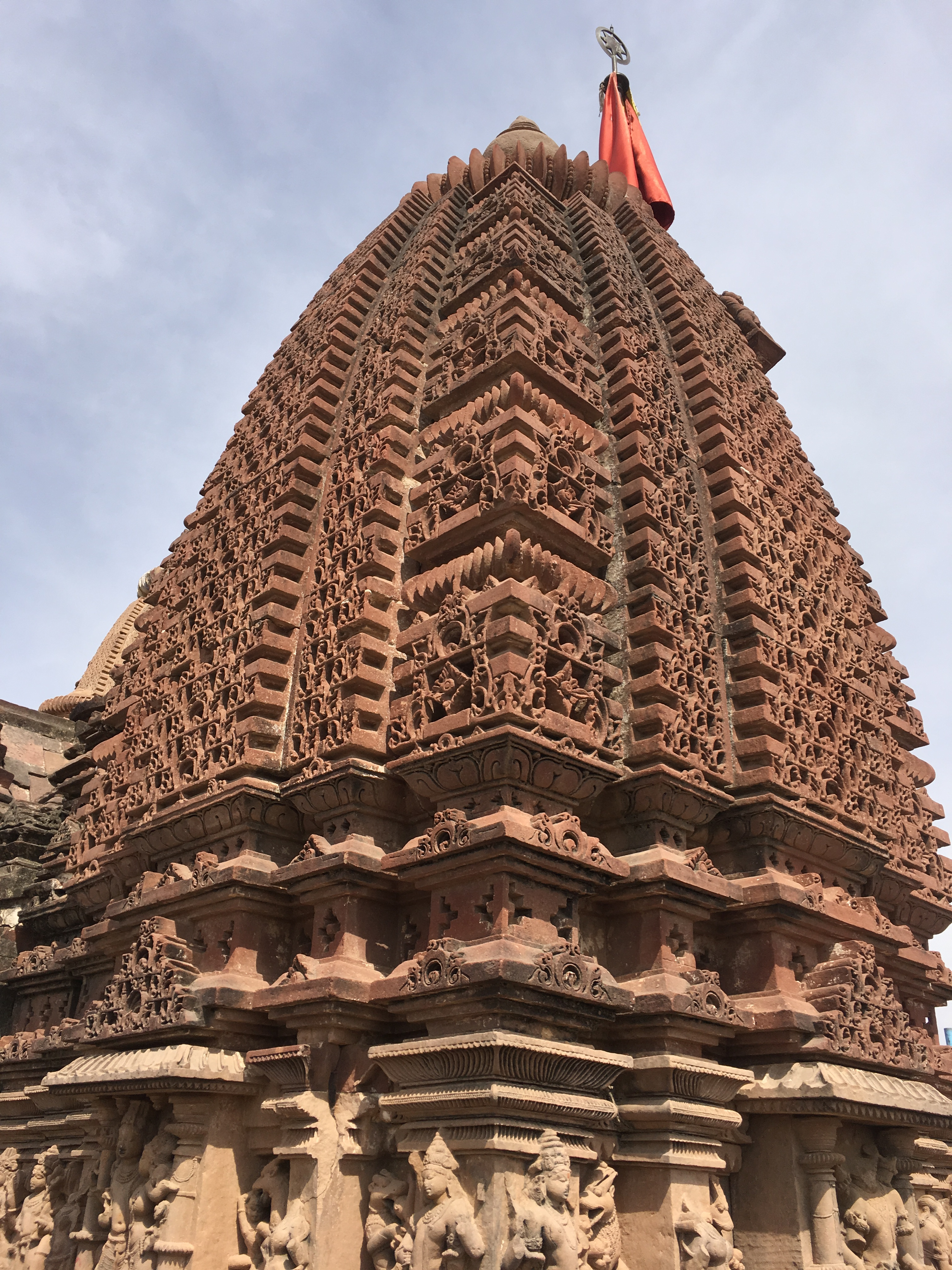
- Sachiya Mata Temple, Osian

- Location in Rajasthan Sachiya Mata Temple (India)

Religion
- Affiliation: Jainism
- Deity: Chamunda

Location
- Location: Osian, near Jodhpur, Rajasthan, India
- State: Rajasthan
- Country: India
- Coordinates: 26.9038°N 72.8165°E

Architecture
- Creator: Gurjara Pratihara period

The Sachchiya Mata Temple is located in Osian, near Jodhpur city in the Indian state of Rajasthan.

The goddess Sachiya (also spelled as Sachayay Mata and Sachchiyay Mata, Hindi: सच्चियाय माता/सच्चिया माता) is worshipped by many castes and communities living in Rajasthan, Gujarat, Madhya Pradesh and North India. The deity is also called as Shri Osiya Mataji.

Osiya was once a large town. Telivada was situated 3 miles (4.8 km) away in Tinvari village. Pandit ji ki Dhani (now the small village of Pandit pur) is 6 miles (9.7 km) away. A further 6 miles (9.7 km) away is Kshatripura. At 24 miles (39 km) is Lohavat, home of iron smiths.108 temples were found in Osiya.

Osiya is situated about 37 miles (60 km) from Jodhpur, Rajasthan. It is connected by roads and trains with Jodhpur and Pokharan.

== Legend ==
According to Jain legends, Acharya Ratnaprabhasuri in (c. 457 BCE) restored the life of son of a Parmara king, Utpal Deva (the then king of Osian), following which, even the villagers converted to Jainism and this place for origination of Oswal community. Witnessing the power of Ratnaprabhasuri Goddess Chamunda was compelled to become a Jain vegetarian deity and became the protector deity of the temple, protecting devotees who worship image of Mahavira in the temple. Ratnaprabhasuri then named her Sachiya Mata as she truthfully advised Ratnaprabhasuri to stay in Osian during Chaturmas. The Sachiya Mata Temple also equally old and important situated on a hill north-east of Mahavira Jain temple, Osian, enable us some clues to understand the social history of that period. This temple has many decorative features of a Jain temple and its establishment can be attributed to the Jains. Jains worship Sacchiya Mata as a samyaktvi (transl. one who has the Ratnatraya) demi-goddess that protects the land and the clan of the Oswals that was established by Acharya Ratnaprabhasuri.

The clan of Oswals is said to have been established by Ratnaprabhasuri in this village. He turned Chamunda vegetarian and consecrated her as Sacchiya Mata (transl. goddess who is on the path of truth) as she followed the true path of non-violence. She was also consecrated as the protecting deity of the clan of Oswals and of the temple of Mahavira at Osian, Jodhpur.

== Gallery ==
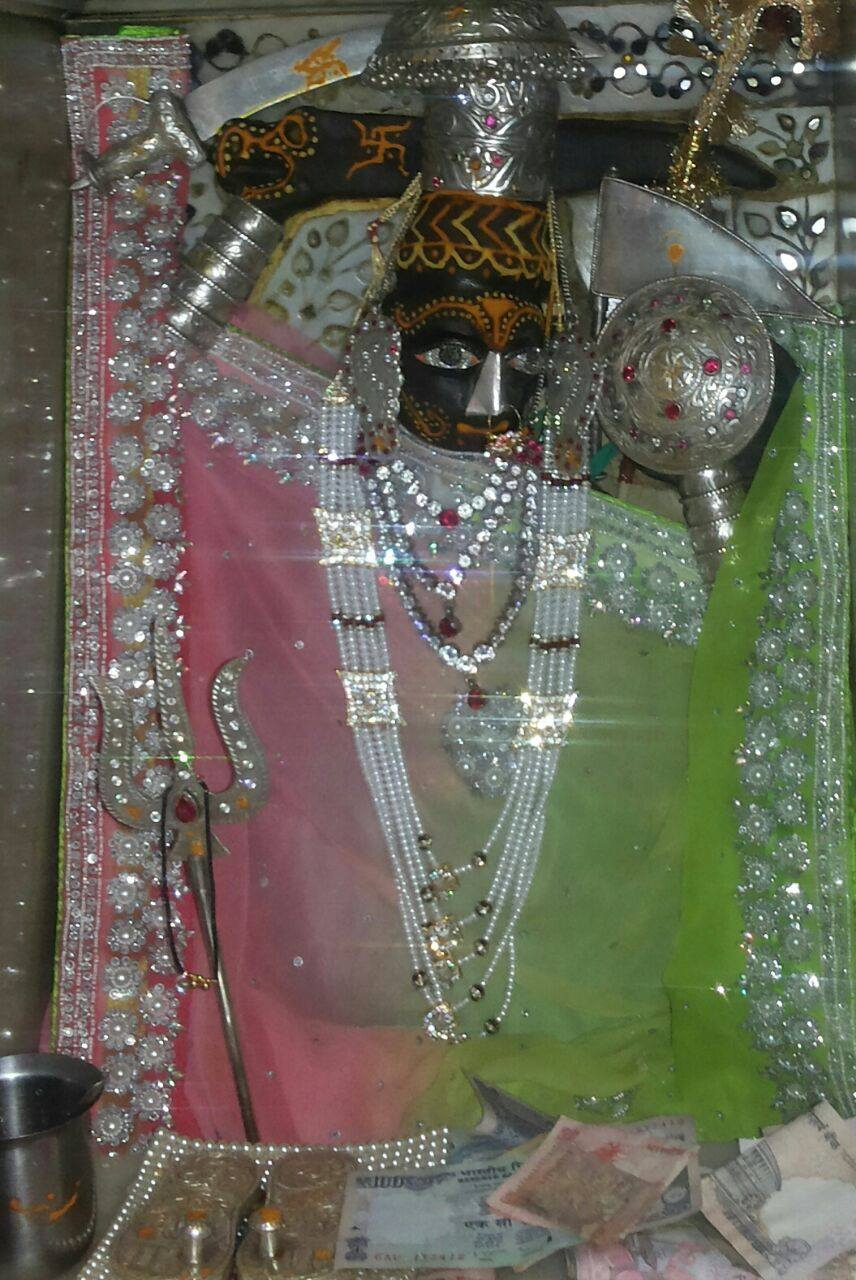
Sachchiya Mata at Osian temple, Rajasthan

Sachchiya Mata temple, 1897

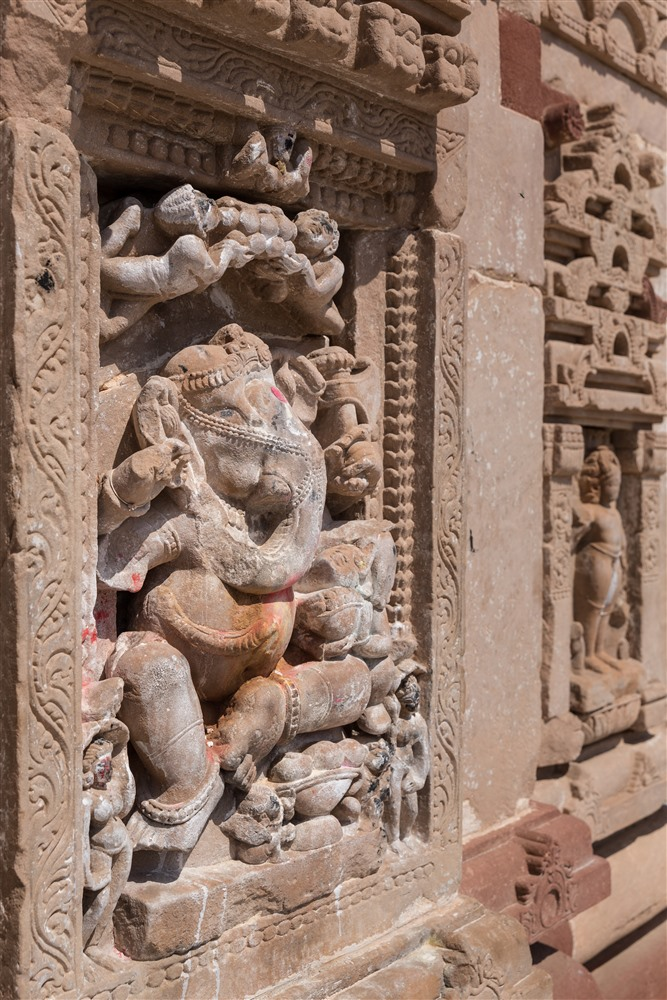
Ganesha panel, 8th-10th cent. , Pratihara dynasty

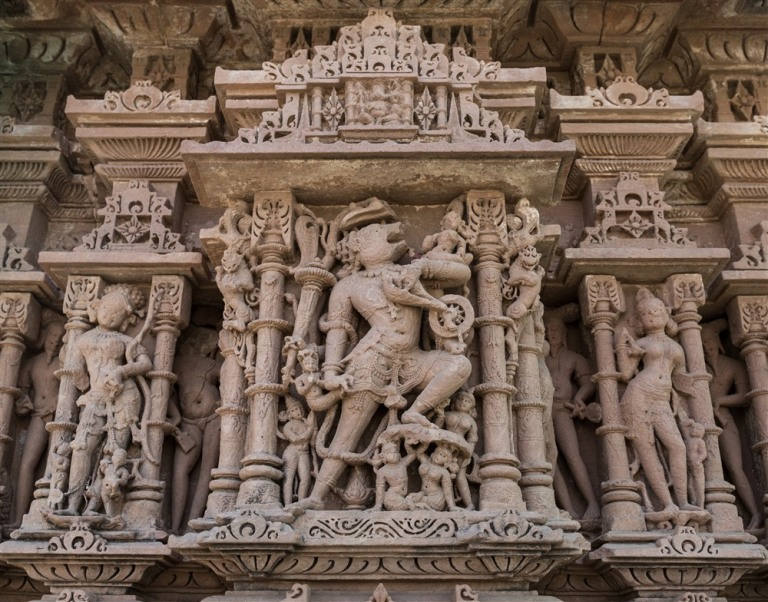
Varaha, 8th-10th cent. , Pratihara dynasty

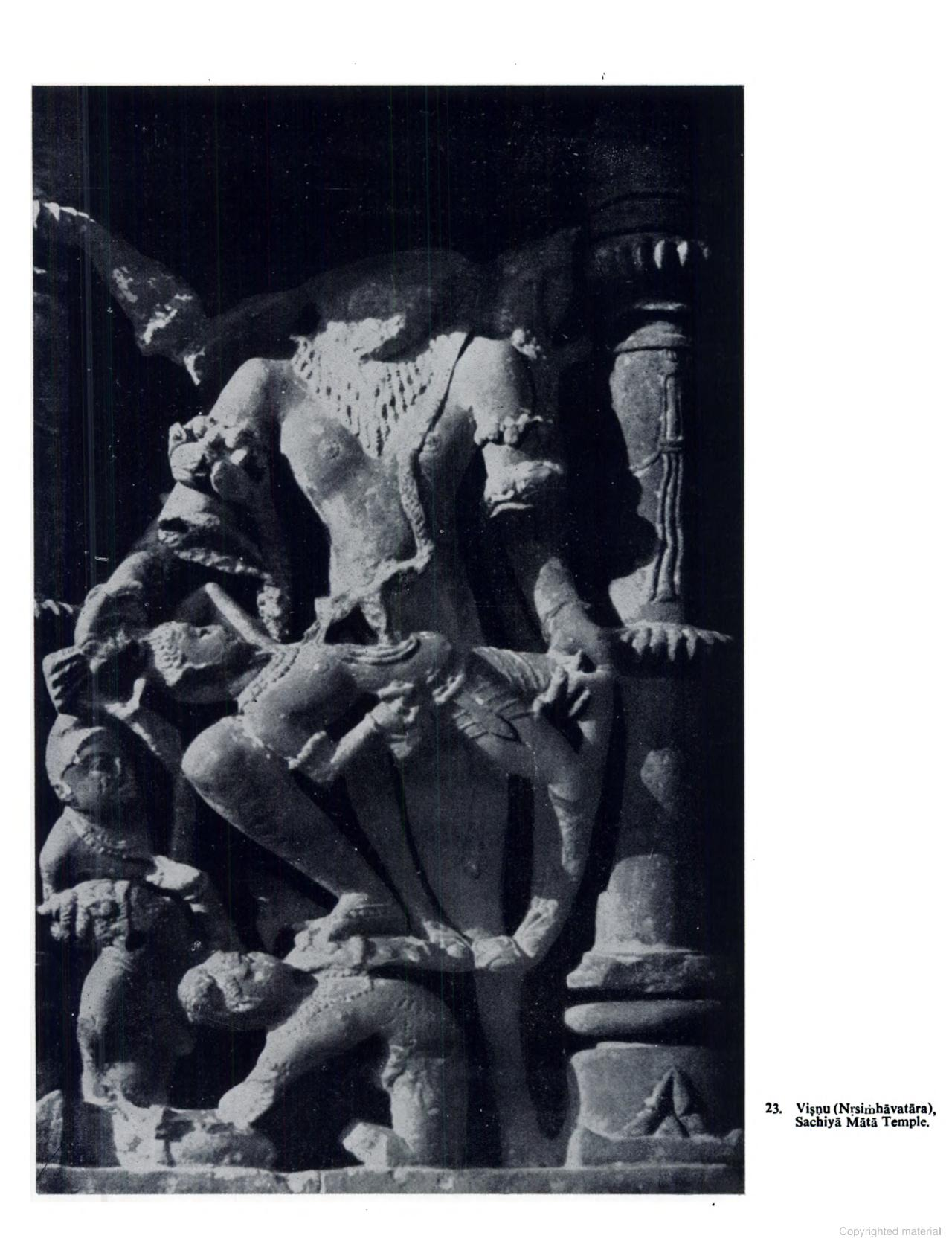
Headless Narasimha, 8th-10th cent. , Pratihara dynasty

== See also ==
- Mahavira Jain temple, Osian
- Jodhpur
- Sachi
- Swayamprabhasuri

== Sources ==
- Babb, Lawrence A. (10 August 2004). Alchemies of Violence: Myths of Identity and the Life of Trade in Western India. New Delhi: SAGE Publishing. ISBN 9788132103219.
- Babb, Lawrence A. (28 May 2015). Understanding Jainism. Understanding Faith. Dunedin Academic Press. ISBN 9781780465357.
- Dundas, Paul (2002) [1992], The Jains (Second ed.), London and New York: Routledge, ISBN 978-0-415-26605-5
- Hassan, Syed Siraj ul (1989). The Castes and Tribes of H.E.H. the Nizam's Dominions. Vol. 1. Asian Educational Services. ISBN 9788120604889.
- Qvarnström, Olle (2010). Jainism and Early Buddhism: Essays in Honor of Padmanabh S. Jaini. Jain Publishing Company. ISBN 978-0-89581-956-7.
