= Kerlanada =

Village in Rajasthan, India

- Village
- Location in Rajasthan, India Kerlanada (India)
- Coordinates: 26.817941°N 72.768097°E
- Country: India
- State: Rajasthan
- District: Jodhpur
- Tehsil: Osian

Area
  - Total: 12.6527 km^{2} (4.8852 sq mi)

Population (2011)
  - Total: 1,429
  - Density: 112.9/km^{2} (292.5/sq mi)

Languages
  - Official: Hindi, Rajasthani
- Time zone: UTC+5:30 (IST)
- PIN: 342303
- Telephone code: 02927
- Vehicle registration: RJ-19

Kerlanada is a village located in the Osian tehsil of Jodhpur district in the state of Rajasthan, India. As per the 2011 Census, the village has a population of 1,429 people.

== Geography ==
Kerlanada is situated approximately 32 km away from the sub-district headquarters of Osian and 96 km away from the district headquarters of Jodhpur. It covers a total area of 12.6527 square kilometers.

== Demographics ==
The village comprises a total of 280 households. The population consists of 768 males and 661 females, with a literacy rate of 55.70%.

== Connectivity ==
Kerlanada is served by public bus services within a distance of 10+ km, and private bus services are available within the village. The nearest railway station is Bhikamkor Railway Station, located in close proximity.

== Nearby Villages ==
Nearby villages include Eramon Ki Dhani, Harlaya, Karni Nagar, Nathawat Nagar, Kasba Nagar, Indon Ki Dhani Ii, Indon Ki Dhani, Shri Ramdev Nagar, Karwaniyon Ki Dhani, and Hari Om Nagar.

== Politics ==
The major political parties in the area are the Bharatiya Janata Party (BJP) and the Indian National Congress (INC).

== Tourism ==
Tourist attractions near Kerlanada include the ancient town of Osian, known for its beautifully sculpted temples and historical significance.
