= Khetasar =

Village in Rajasthan, India

- Village
- Location in Rajasthan, India Khetasar (India)
- Coordinates: 26°40′53″N 72°49′43″E
- Country: India
- State: Rajasthan
- District: Jodhpur
- Tehsil: Osian Tehsil

Languages
- Time zone: UTC+5:30 (IST)
- PIN: 342301

Khetasar is a village in the Osian Tehsil of Jodhpur District in the state of Rajasthan, India. It is part of the Jodhpur Division and is situated 57 kilometers north of the district headquarters Jodhpur. Khetasar is located 19 kilometers from Osian and 348 kilometers from the state capital Jaipur.

== Nearby Villages ==
- Khabra Khurd (8 km)
- Banakabas (10 km)
- Osian (10 km)
- Berdon Ka Bas (13 km)
- Tapu (13 km)
