= Basni Harisingh =

Village in Rajasthan, India

Coordinates: 26°50′24″N 73°30′14″E

Basni Harisingh is a village located in Osian Tehsil of Jodhpur district, Rajasthan, India. The village has a population of 775 including 101 families of which 409 are males while 366 are females per the 2011 census.
