= Matora =

- Village
- Location in Rajasthan, India
- Coordinates: 26.9578924°N 72.8723459°E
- Country: India
- State: Rajasthan
- Division: Jodhpur
- District: Jodhpur
- Tehsil: Osian

Languages
  - Official: Hindi
  - Native: Rajasthani
- Time zone: UTC+5:30 (IST)
- PIN: 342311
- Public Transportation: Rajasthan Roadways

Matora is a village in Osian tehsil in Jodhpur district of Rajasthan State, India. Its population was 2,612 as per the 2011 census.
