= Samrau =

- town
- Location in Rajasthan, India Samrau (India)
- Coordinates: 26°51′58″N 72°43′14″E
- Country: India
- State: Rajasthan
- District: Jodhpur
- Tehsil: Osian
- Elevation: 230 m (750 ft)

Population (2011)
  - Total: 1,554

Languages
- Time zone: UTC+5:30 (IST)
- PIN: 342302
- ISO 3166 code: RJ-IN
- Vehicle registration: RJ-xxx

Samrau is a medium-sized village located in Osian, Tehsil of the Jodhpur District, Rajasthan, with a total of 244 families residing in it. According to the 2011 Population Census, Samrau has a population of 1,554 people. Of that number, the census identifies 822 individuals as male and 732 as female. As per the constitution of India and Panchyati Raaj Act, Samrau village is governed by an elected representative called a Sarpanch (Head of Village). Samrau has one Primary Health Center and more than 10 Schools within its territory, including Rajputs, Jats and Bishnoi's. The village has temples of almost all the Hindu gods.

== Samrau violence ==
On the evening of 14 January 2018, a 36-year-old liquor trader, Hanuman Ram Jat, a history-sheeter was shot at and ran over by a vehicle in Samrau. After the murder around 10 thousand Jaat people gathered at Samrau along with few local Jaat MLAs. Tension prevailed at the village due to the villagers being in a strike along with the body of deceased, demanding the arrests of all the accused in this connection. The protesters set many shops and houses of the Rajput people in the village on fire, damaged police vehicles, and also pelted stones. They also destroyed the old Raawla (King Residence); this incident is considered as the failure of Jodhpur Police. After the civil unrest, the Home minister Gulab Chand Kataria, state police DGP and many MPs as well as MLAs visited the village.

== Geography ==
Samrau is located in the Thar Desert at an elevation of 230 meters above mean sea level. The village is 90 km from district headquarter Jodhpur and 40 km from Osian.
