= Jivantasvami =

Jain imagery of Mahavira as a prince

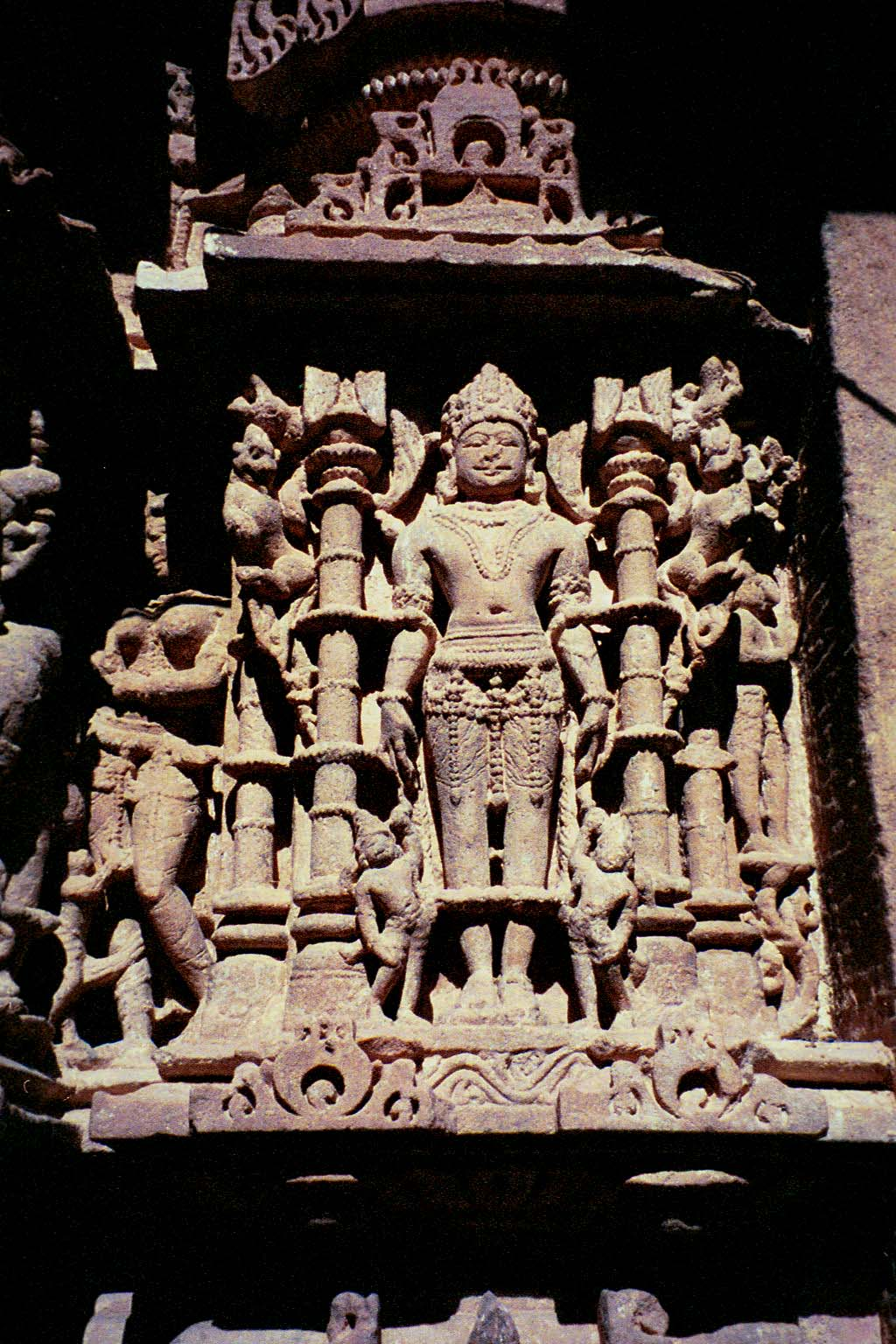
Jivantasvami image of a Tirthankara carved on Torana in Mahavira Jain temple, Osian.

Jivantasvami images represent the Jain Tirthankara Mahavira (and in some cases other Tirthankaras) as a prince, with a crown and ornaments. The Jina is represented as standing in the kayotsarga pose. Jivantasvami images have been used only in the Śvetāmbara Jain tradition, they are unknown in the Digambara tradition.

== Description ==
The earliest reference to the Jivantasvami images is found in the later commentaries on the Śvetāmbara Jain Agamas (c.mid 6th century CE onwards), Vasudevahindi of Samghadasagani(c. mid 6th century CE) the Avashyakachurni (c. 625 CE) the Avashyakavritti of Haribhadra Suri(c. 750 CE) and the Trishashtishalakapurushacharita of Hemachandra (c. 1169-72 CE). These mention the existence of Jivantasvami images at Ujjain, Dashapura (Mandsaur), Vidisha, Vitabhayapattana, Puri and Koshala. Mahavira Jain temple, Osian houses three 5.7 feet (1.7 m) Jivantasvami images inside temple. Two of these idols are identical, with one having inscription dated 1044 C.E. that identifies the idol to be of Rishabhanatha.

According to Hemachandra, the original image was made by god Vidyunmali, carved in sandalwood, during the time Mahavira was still a prince. According to the legend of the queen of Udayana of Vitabhaya worshipped this image. This image was eventually installed at Vidisha, but was eventually lost.

The best known images of Jivantasvami were found in the Akota Hoard, and are widely mentioned examples of the early western Indian school of art. One of them is specifically inscribed as Jivantsvami installed by Nagisvari, which represents early phase of the Gupta style. The images were dug out sometime before June 1951. A University of Baroda professor brought five of them to archaeologist U.P. Shah for examination. U.P. Shat eventually purchased most of the images from local individuals and presented them to M.S. University, which are now in the Baroda Museum. The two Jivantasvami images along with the rest of the Akota Hoard bronzes are in the Baroda Museum & Picture Gallery. The two Jivantasvami idols at are dateable to 6th century.

Other tirthankaras including Rishabhnath (1st Jina), Sumatinatha (5th Jina), Chandraprabha (8th Jina), Shitalanatha (10th Jina), Shantinath (16th Jina), Munisuvrata (20th Jina) and Parshvanatha (23rd Jina), were also sometimes represented in the form of Jivantasvami.
