= Cherai, Rajasthan =

Cherai
- Village
- Cherai
- Interactive map of Cherai
- Coordinates: 26°46′29″N 72°19′50″E
- Country: India
- State: Rajasthan
- District: Jodhpur
- Tehsil: [[tiwari Jodhpur]]

Population (2011)
  - Total: 3,175
- Time zone: UTC+5:30 (IST)
- PIN: 342306

Cherai is a village in Osian, Jodhpur Tehsil, Jodhpur district, Rajasthan, India.
