= Mahavira Jain temple, Osian =

Śvetāmbara Jain temple in Rajasthan, India

Mahavira Jain temple
- Mahavira Jain Temple in 1897

- Location of Mahavira Derasar in Rajasthan

Religion
- Affiliation: Jainism
- Sect: Śvetāmbara
- Deity: Mahavira
- Festival: Mahavir Janma Kalyanak
- Governing body: Seth Shri Mangalsinghji Ratansinghji Dev ki Pedhi

Location
- Location: Osian, Jodhpur, Rajasthan
- Coordinates: 26°43′28.4″N 72°53′30.4″E

Architecture
- Style: Gurjara-Pratihara
- Creator: Vatsaraja
- Established: 783 A.D.
- Temple: 1

The Mahavira Jain temple is built in Osian of Jodhpur District, Rajasthan. The temple is an important pilgrimage of the Oswal Jain community. This temple is the oldest surviving Jain temple in Western India and was built during the reign of Mahārāja Śrī Vatsarāja of Imperial Pratihāras.

== History ==
The Mahavira Temple is an important tirtha for Jains. According to an inscription found at Sachiya Mata Temple dating back to 956 A.D., it was built during the Gurjara-Pratihara dynasty by King Vatsaraja in 783 AD, making it the oldest surviving Jain temple in Western India. According to Jain legends, Acharya Ratnaprabhasuri in (c. 457 BCE) restored the life of son of a prominent brahman following this even the villagers converted to Jainism and this place for origination of Oswal community. Witnessing the power of Ratnaprabhasuri Goddess Chamunda was compelled to become a Jain vegetarian deity and became the protector deity of the temple, protecting devotees who worship image of Mahavira in the temple. Ratnaprabhasuri then named her Sachiya Mata as she truthfully advised Ratnaprabhasuri to stay in Osian during Chaturmas. The idol of Mahavira was discovered from buried at temple site.

The Sachiya Mata Temple also equally old and important situated on a hill north-east of this temple enables us some to understand the social history of that period. The Sachiya Mata Temple has many decorative features of a Jain temple and its establishment can be attributed to the Jains. Jains worship Sacchiya Mata as a samyaktvi (transl. one who has the Ratnatraya) demi-goddess that protects the land and the clan of the Oswals that was established by Acharya Ratnaprabhasuri.

The clan of Oswals is said to have been established by Ratnaprabhasuri in this village. He turned Chamunda vegetarian and consecrated her as Sacchiya Mata (transl. goddess who is on the path of truth) as she followed the true path of non-violence. She was also consecrated as the protecting deity of the clan of Oswals and of the temple of Mahavira at Osian, Jodhpur.

An inscription dating 953 CE found in the temple states that Osian was rich with decorated temples of every caste. The temple had its first renovation in 956 AD. George Michell describes the existing main temple as "mostly 11th century", with parts from the 8th century. The torana (ornate gateway) is from 1015 CE. The temple was plundered by Muslim rulers, and none of the original idols survived. In 1016 CE, the temple was restored, and a manastambha was constructed. The temple was later renovated in the 12th century.

== Architecture ==
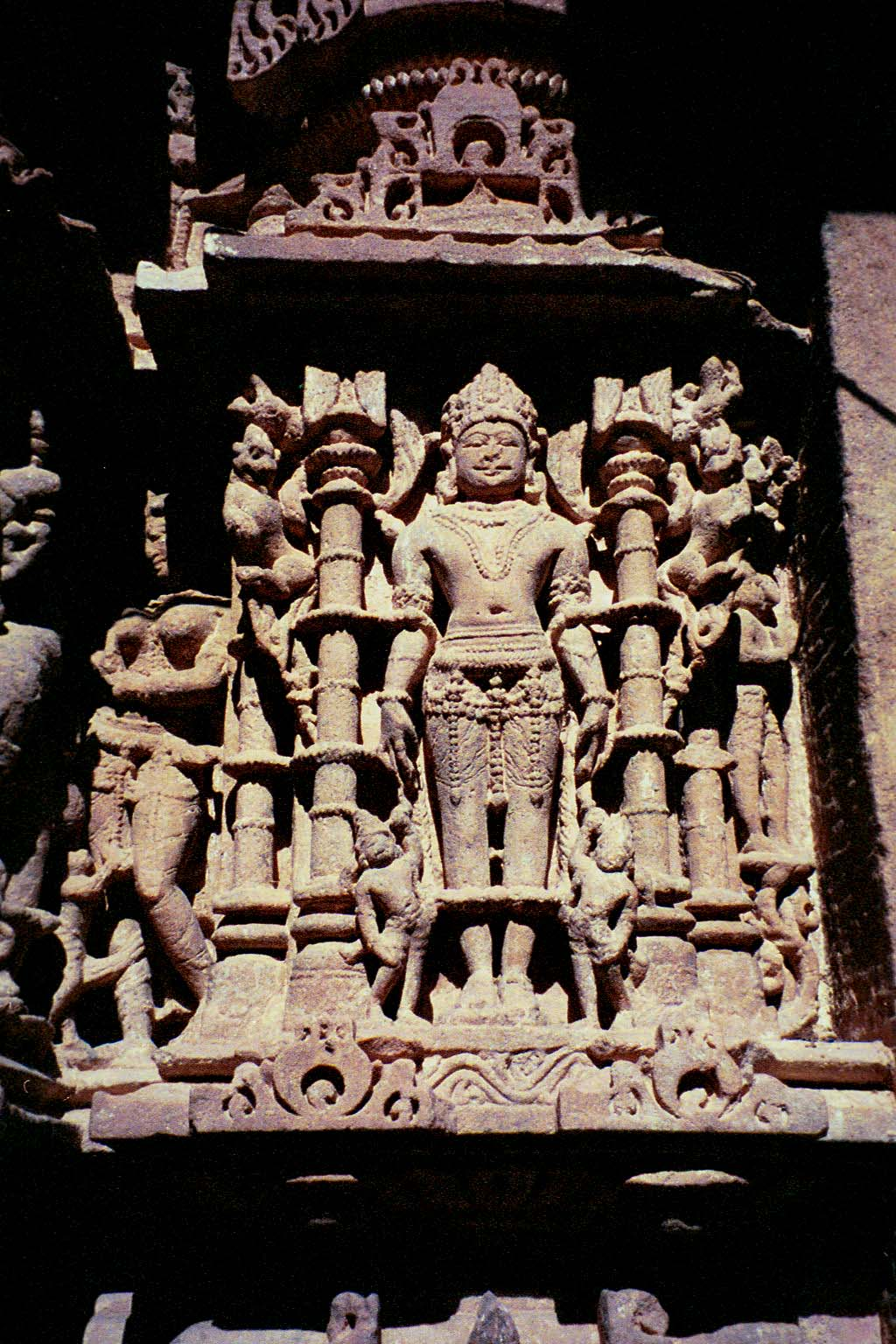
Jivantasvami image of Tirthankara carved on Torana

The Jain temple is dedicated to Mahavira and belongs to Śvētāmbara sect of Jainism. The temple is considered a testimony of architecture Gurjara-Pratihara dynasty. This a large temple surrounded by enclosing wall consisting of garbhagriha, mandapa. The temple features a sanctum, a closed hall, an open porch and an ornate Torana (gateway) and exquisite sculptures. The temple has one closed and two pillared halls elongated the axis of principal shrine. The torana in front of the sanctum is rich with ornate carvings of tirthankaras, 12 in padmasan posture and 4 kayotsarga positions. The pillars of the temple feature intricate artwork are particular Maha-Maru tradition. The temple has seven subsidiaries, four on the eastern and three of the western side of the sanctum. These shrines are joined by pradaksinapatha. Eastern parts of the shrine have figures of Mahavira and Parshavanatha. The Shikhara of the garbhagriha and subsidiary shrine are crowned with amalaka and kalasa. The shikhara above mulprasad was constructed later with Māru-Gurjara architecture.

The temple has a large image of Mahavira covered with 400 grams (14 oz) of gold is placed inside the garbhagriha. The outer and inner walls of the sanctum and closed hall are profusely decorated with carvings of Asta-Dikpalas, yaksha—yakshi, tirthankara, vidyadevi, and other deities. Vidyadevi sculptures are portrayed as playing musical instruments. The northern, southern, western walls of the temple have carvings of Neminatha's life like birth, war, renunciation, etc. The antarala ceiling of every shrine in the temple complex is rich with carvings of flowers. Dev-Kulika temple is also part of the temple complex.

There are three 5.7 feet (1.7 m) Jivantasvami images inside temple. Two of these idols are identical, with one having inscription dated 1044 C.E. that identifies the idol to be of Rishabhanatha. These idols depicts Tirthankara in Kayotsarga posture with ashta-pratiharya (barring lion-throne), yaksha—yakshi, mahavidyas, and miniature Jina figures on patrika.

A Dādābadī housing footprints of Jain monks is also present near the Mahavir temple.

Mahavira temple is one of the most renowned temples in India. The elaborate architecture is comparable to that Parshvanatha temple, Khajuraho and Ranakpur Jain temple.

== Gallery ==
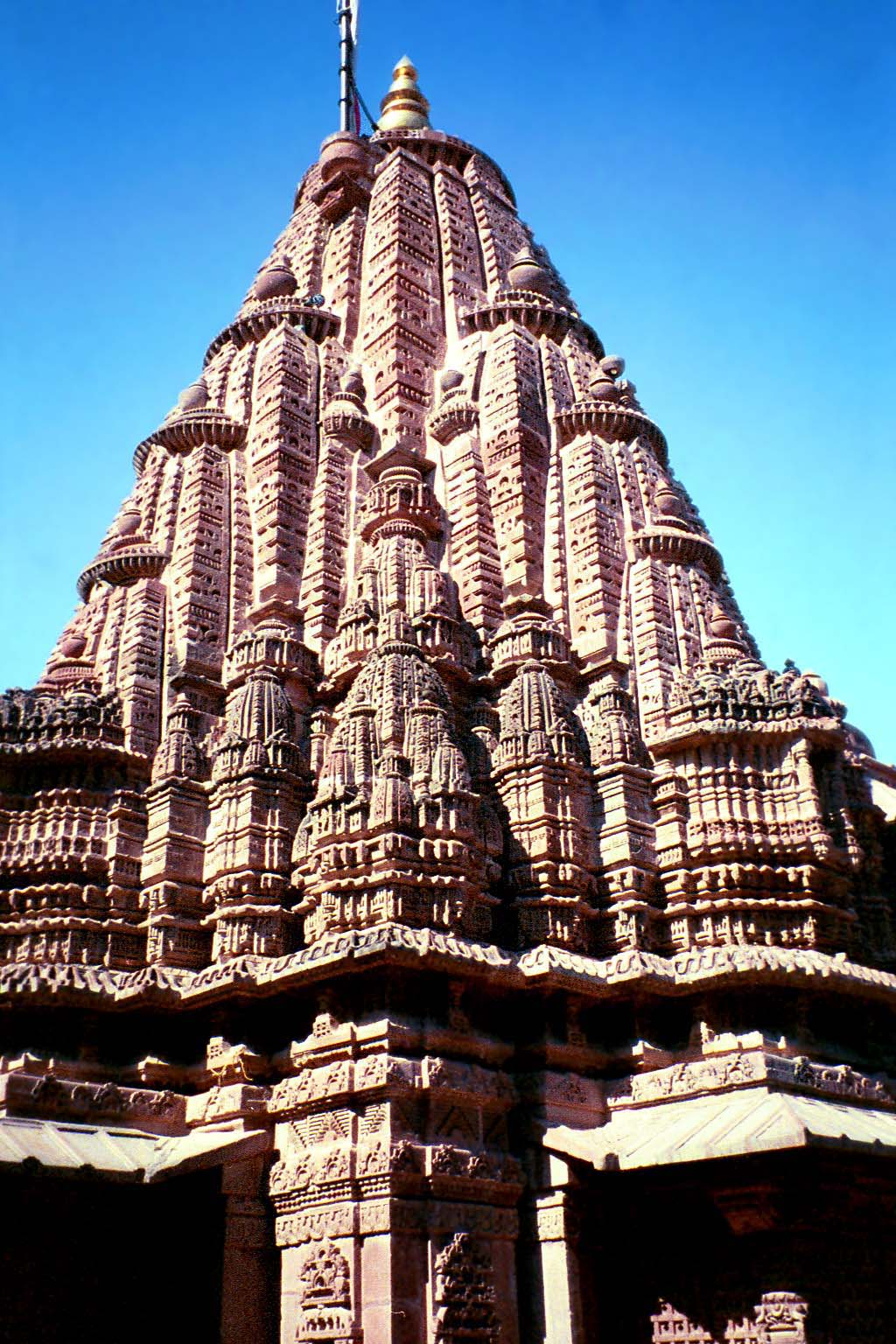
Sikhara of the temple

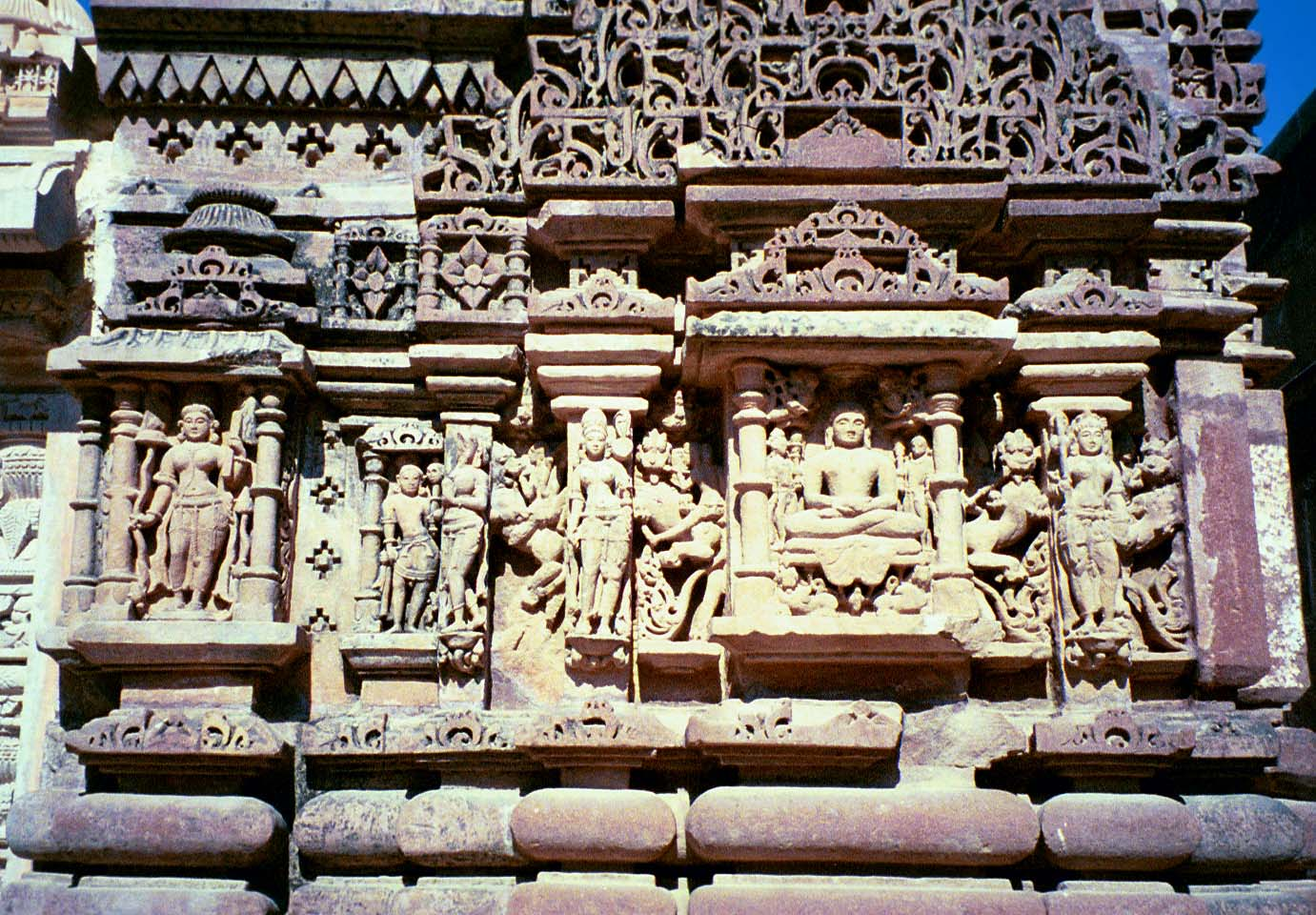
Detailed carving on wall

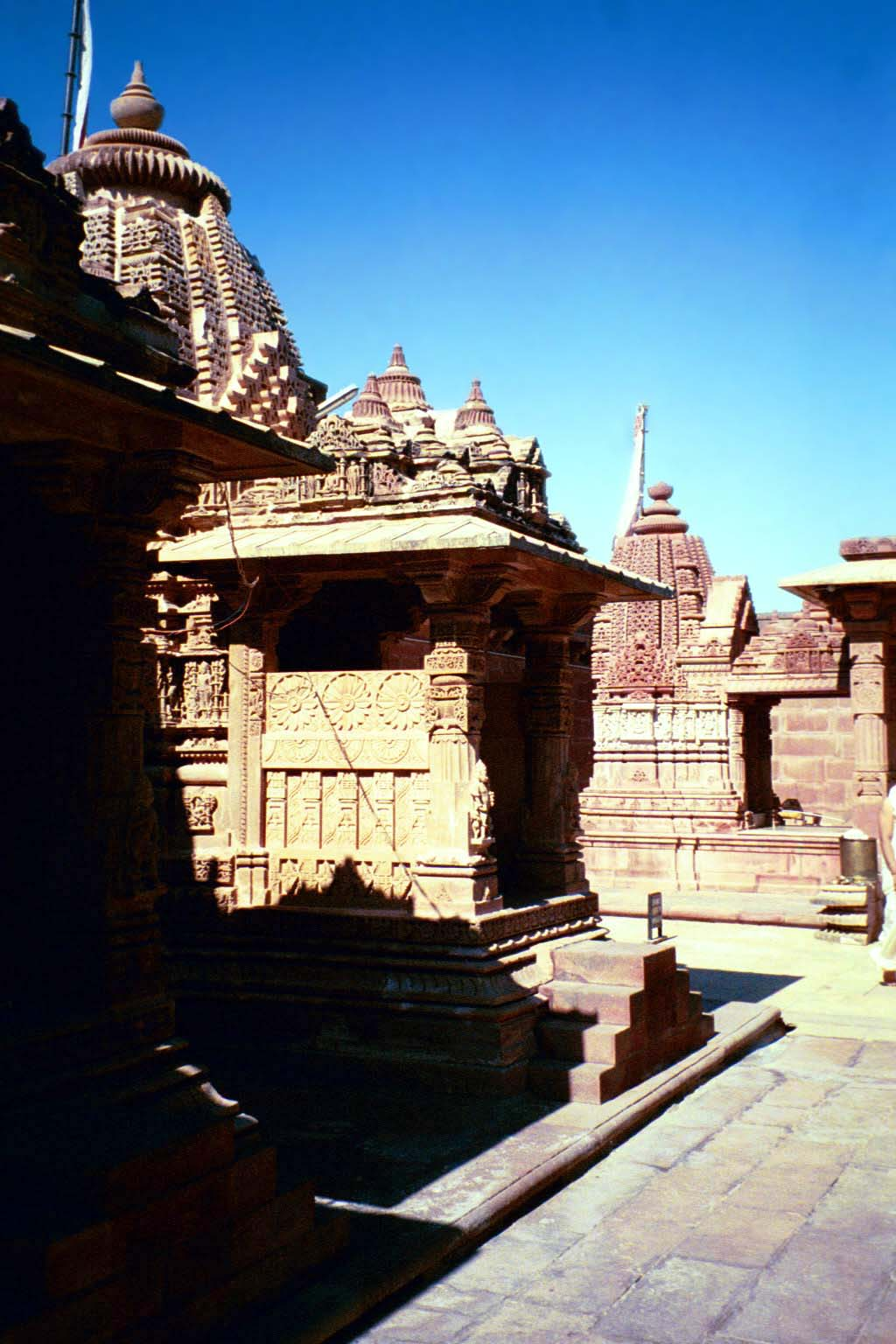
Temple side view

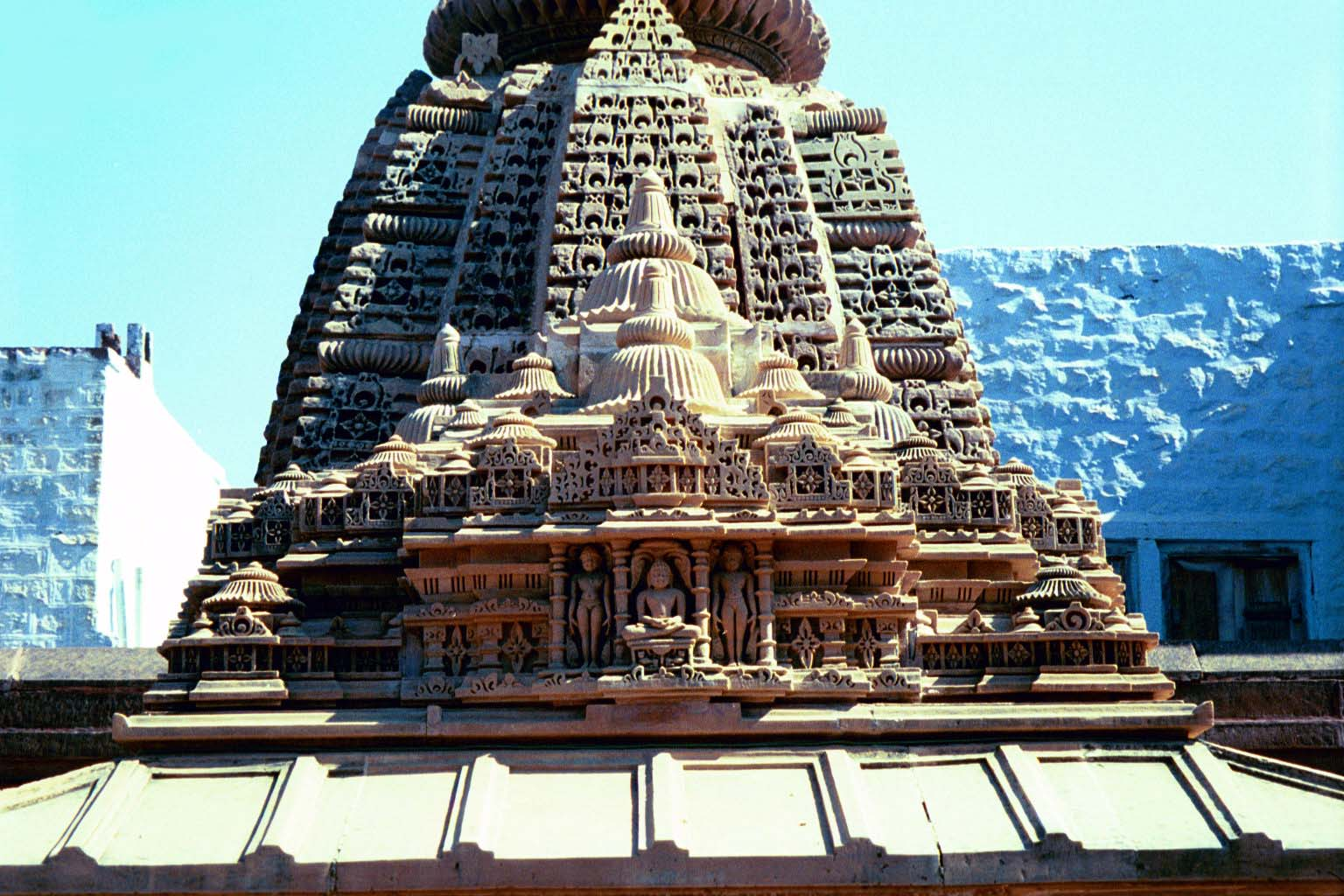
Shikhar

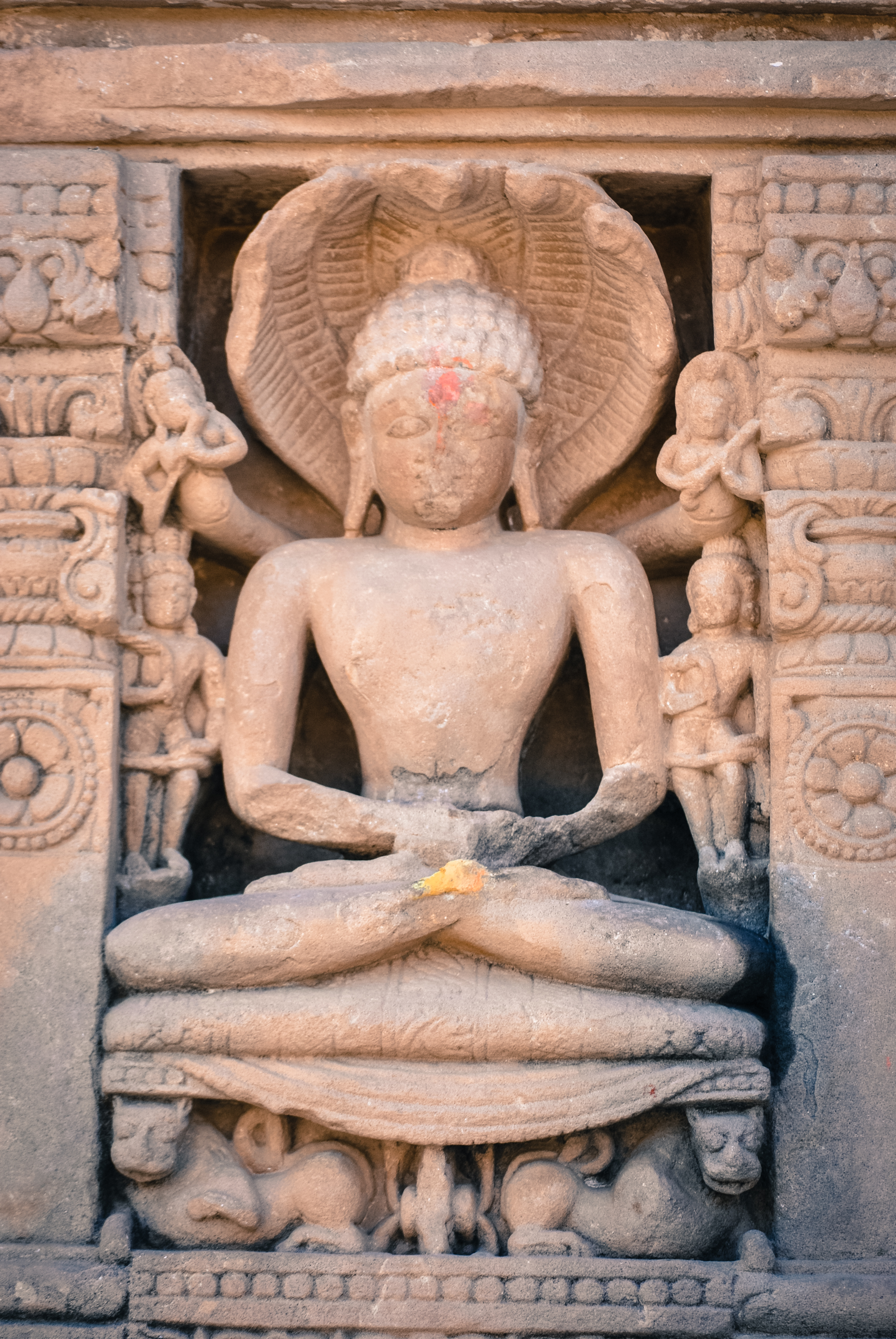
Carving of Parshvanath on wall

Pillars in Jaina temple Osia in India 1897

== Conservation ==
The temple has undergone repairs, renovations, and modifications. The temple is protected by Archaeological Survey of India.

== See also ==
- Jainism in Rajasthan
- Naugaza Digambar Jain temple
- Swayamprabhasuri
- Porwal
