= Ratnaprabhasuri =

Indian Jain ascetic (527 BC – 443 BC)

Ācārya Ratnaprabhasuri Mahārāja Sāheb
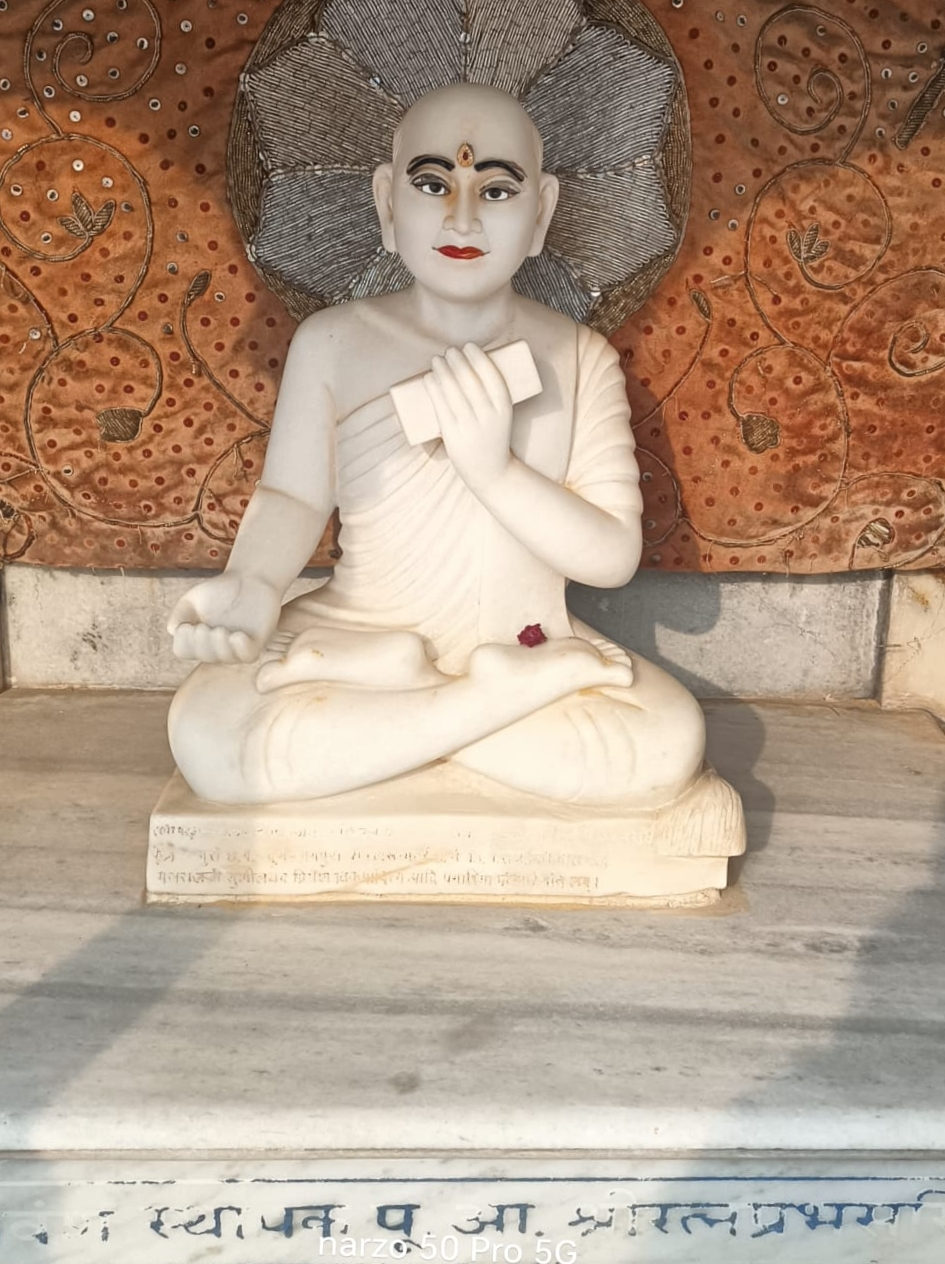
- An idol of Acharya Ratnaprabhasuri at Uvasaggaharam Śvetāmbara Jain Tirth, Chhattisgarh

Personal life
- Born: Ratnachuda Vidyādhara; 527 BC Mount Vaitādhya
- Died: 443 BC Palitana temples
- Known for: Condemnation of animal sacrifice and creation of Oswāl clan
- Other names: Ratnachudamuni, Ratnaprabhamuni, Ratnachuda Vidyādhara
- Honours: Purvadhāri, Śrut Kevalī

Religious life
- Religion: Jainism
- Lineage: of Parshvanatha
- Sect: Śvetāmbara; Upkeśa Gaccha
- Initiation: by Ācārya Swayamprabhasuri

Religious career
- Predecessor: Swayamprabhasuri
- Successor: Yakshadevasuri

Ratnaprabhasuri was a Śvetāmbara Jain ascetic and the 6th successor in the lineage of the monastic heads of the Chaturvidha Sangha's (transl. four-fold congregation) Upkeśa Gaccha. He succeeded Swayamprabhasuri and is believed to have existed in 6th–5th century BC. He is most well-known as the founder of the Oswāl clan of Śvetāmbara Jains.

== Birth and initiation ==
As per scriptures of the Śvetāmbara sect, he is believed to have been born in the 5th century BC in a royal family belonging to the Vidyādhara clan as Prince Ratnachuda. Later on, he became a Vidyādhara king. As a member of the Vidyādhara clan, he is said to have possessed several vidyās (magical powers). Śvetāmbara scriptures have vivid descriptions of Vidyādhara kingdoms and legends about the magical powers possessed by the members of this clan.

According to legends, Swayamprabhasuri was once preaching lay followers about renouncing and embracing monkhood, and King Ratnachuda was flying above him like Vidyādharas usually did. Ratnachuda halted to hear the sermon. Moved by the sermon, the soft-hearted king expressed his will to become a monk. He renounced his wealth and kingdom. His son, Kanakchuda, succeeded him as the next Vidyādhara king. With 500 other Vidyādharas, Ratnachuda accepted initiation into the Jain sangha and was known as Ratnachudamuni.

== Monastic lineage ==
According to the 23rd chapter of the Uttaradhyayana Sutra, an ancient canonical text of the Śvetāmbara sect, Keśiśramanācharya, the 4th pattadhār in Parshvanatha's lineage, had a conversation with Mahavira's prime disciple Gautama Swami about the differences in the teachings of Parshvanatha and Mahavira. Disciples of Parshvanatha wore colored (usually dark-brown) clothes and those of Mahavira wore seamless white clothes. It is such differences that Keśiśramanācharya discusses with Gautama Swami.

The text further states that upon receiving adequately satisfying answers from Gautama Swami, Keśiśramanācharya and all his disciples accepted the order of Mahavira and merged into Mahavira's Chaturvidha Sangha. Later on, this lineage came to be known as the Upkeśa Gaccha. Even after the merger, this gaccha (transl. administrative sub-sect) always maintained its unique identity of being one of Parshvanatha's lineage until its extinction in and around 1930 AD. Ratnaprabhasuri was the 6th head of the Upkeśa Gaccha after Ganadhara Shubhadatt, Arya Haridattsuri, Arya Samudrasuri, Keśiśramanācharya and Swayamprabhasuri.

== Ascetic life ==
Just like his preceptor Swayamprabhasuri, he is also said to have been well-versed with the Dvādaśāṅga (transl. 12 aṅgas) and the 14 purvas of the Jain canon. He is, considered to have known the complete canon, making him one of the Śrut Kevalīs. Since he knew the 14 purvas, he is considered to have been a Purvadhāri as well. The full text of 12th aṅga Drstivada including the 14 purvas is completely lost now.

According to a non-canonical Śvetāmbara text "Upkeśa Gaccha Caritra" (transl. Biography of the Upkeśa Gaccha) of the Śvetāmbara sect, 52 years after Mahavira's nirvana, Swayamprabhasuri consecrated Ratnachudamuni as the next acharya (transl. head of the monastic order) of Upkeśa Gaccha and named him Ācārya Ratnaprabhasuri.

He became the 6th pattadhār (transl. head of the monastic order) in the 23rd tirthankara Parshvanatha's lineage. Therefore, unlike most Jain ascetics today who trace their lineage to the 24th Tirthankara Mahavira, Ratnaprabhasuri traces his monastic lineage to the 23rd Tirthankara Parshvanatha.

Scriptures describing his life mention that he helped eliminate violent practices of animal sacrifice in the name of religion, especially the rituals of Shaktism in several regions, with his efforts at Osian being the most popular and recognized.

== Creation of the 'Oswāl clan' ==
=== History of Upkeśapattan (or Osian) ===
Ratnaprabhasuri's preceptor Swayamprabhasuri had converted King Jayasena, the ruler of Śrīmal, into a devout Jain Śrāvaka. The king had two sons, namely Bhīmasena and Chandrasena. The former was a devout Shaiva and the latter a devout Jain. Since Bhīmasena was older than Chandrasena, he acceded to the throne after the king's death. Injustice to Jains became commonplace. All Jains, along with Chandrasena moved towards Mount Abu, and established a new town named Chandrāvati with Chandrasena as their ruler. Chandrasena constructed 300 Jain temples at Chandravati, the consecration of which was performed by Swayamprabhasuri. Meanwhile, Bhīmasena was regretting his decision. He also changed the name of Śrīmal to Bhinmal. Bhīmasena had two sons, namely Shrīpunja and Uppaldeva. Due to internal disputes, Uppaldeva left the kingdom to establish a kingdom on his own. He established the town of Upkeśapattan near modern-day Jodhpur. Later, this town came to be known as Osian. Several householders from various towns and villages moved to Upkeśapattan. The merchants of the town did well and the town flourished.

=== Ratnaprabhasuri's penance near Upkeśapattan ===
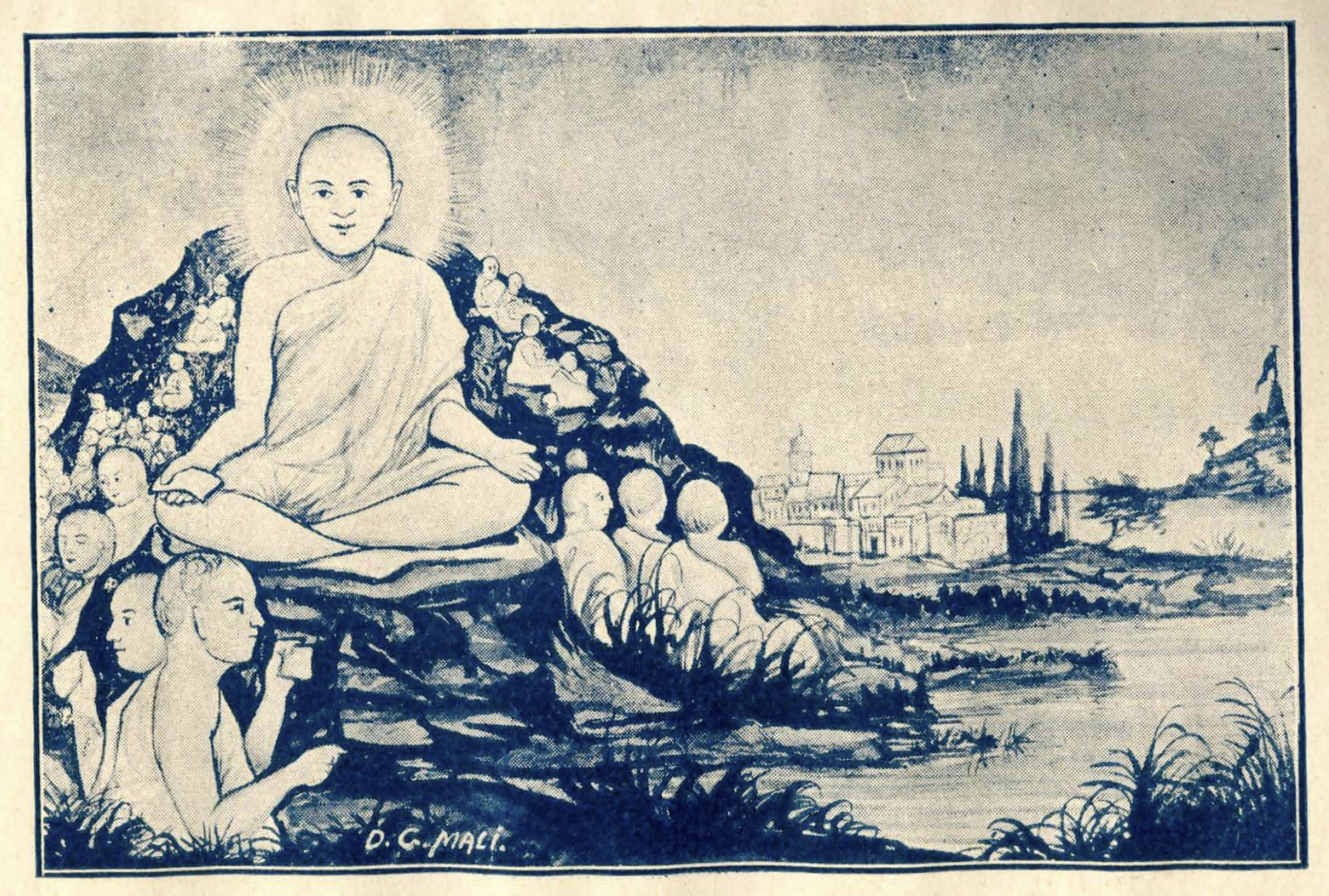
Ratnaprabhasuri and his 500 disciples doing a month-long fast and penance at Lunaadri hill near Osian

According to a legend, in 457 BC, Ratnaprabhasuri was at Mount Abu, and demi-goddess Chakreshvari appeared before him and urged him to spread the word of Jainism and save animals from religious violence in Maru Pradesh. She said that Swayamprabhasuri could not go beyond Śrīmal and Chandravati. He agreed to her and started moving towards Rajasthan with his 500 disciples. Upon reaching, he and his disciples started a month-long penance on a small hill just outside the town. When it was time to break the fast, his disciples entered the town to beg for alms. They could not find food 'free from 42 faults' as all residents of the town worshipped Chamunda, performed animal sacrifice, and consumed food unfit for Jain monks. In such situation, it was getting difficult for monks to survive and Ratnaprabhasuri ordered all his disciples to begin moving to another city.

=== Ratnaprabhasuri's chaturmasya at Upkeśapattan ===
Legends say that demi-goddesses Chamunda and Chakreshvari are friendly to one another. Due to this relationship between them and knowing that the monks sent by Chakreshvari were going away, Chamunda met Ratnaprabhasuri and urged him to stay for chaturmasya. He ordered monks who would not be able to perform severe penance to start walking towards another town. 465 monks left and 35 monks stayed with him.

Uppaldeva's daughter Saubhāgyadevi was married to his minister Uhada's son. He was bitten by a snake and all forms of treatment did not help revive him. When he was being taken for cremation, Chamunda took the form of a white-clad Jain monk and told the people that he was still alive and then disappeared. When Uppaldeva heard this, he and the others took his son-in-law to Ratnaprabhasuri. The water collected after washing Ratnaprabhasuri's feet was splashed on the prince's face and he was instantly revived. The king felt indebted to Ratnaprabhasuri and gifted him valuables. However, the latter denied stating that he had given up his kingdom at Mount Vaitādhya to become a monk. He said that he would not accept any such materialistic repayment. The people requested him to deliver a sermon.

=== Ratnaprabhasuri's sermon ===
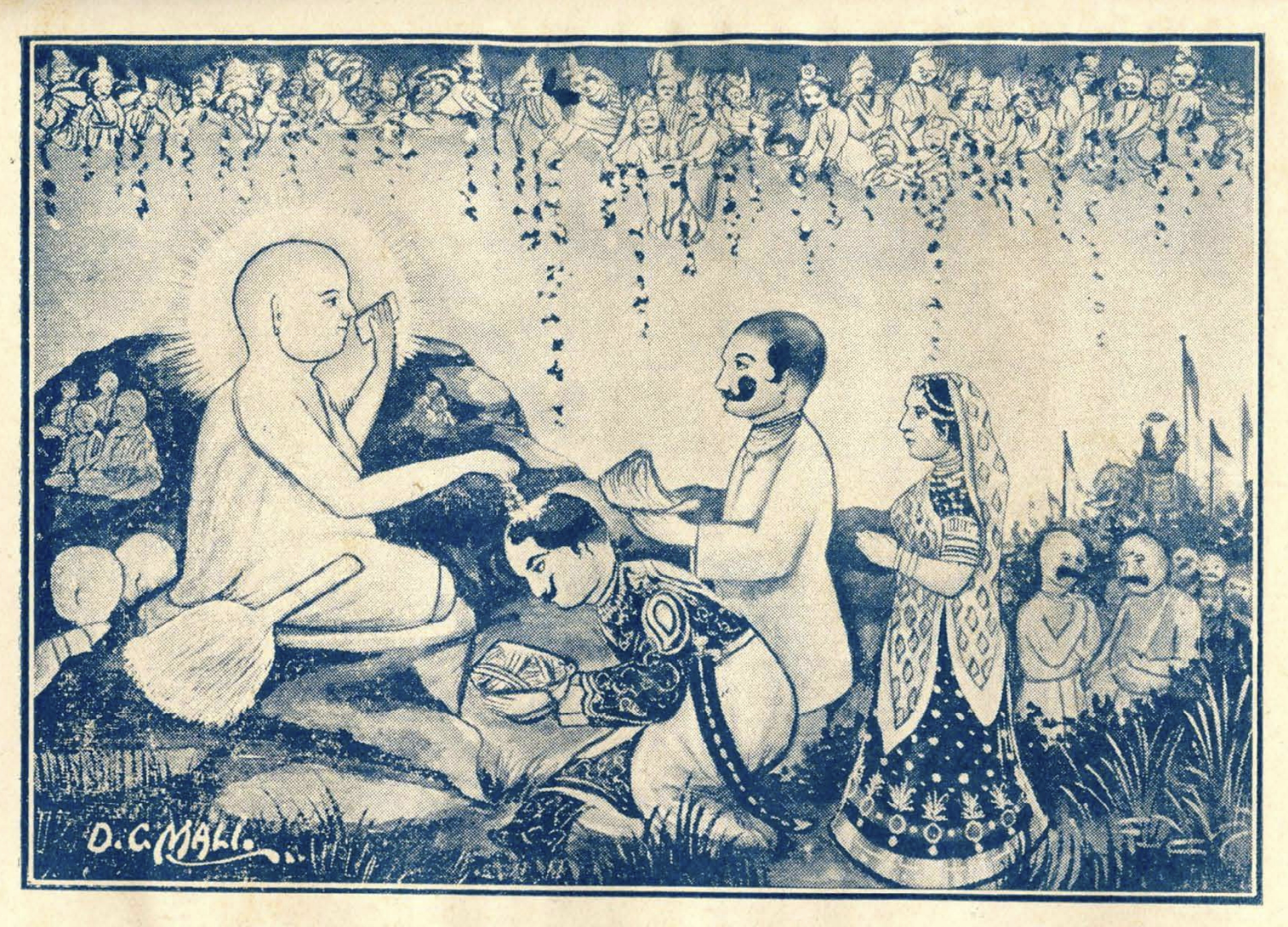
Ratnaprabhasuri converts Utpaldeva and residents of Osian into Jains

He delivered an impactful sermon on the various bodies a soul wanders in and how rare a birth a human is. He emphasized that in such a rare state, one should perform acts of righteousness and embrace non-violence. He then preached about the twelve vows of householders and five vows of Jain monks that lead to Ratnatraya and eventual moksha. He condemned the consumption of alcohol and meat sternly and on giving up animal sacrifice. He also insisted upon embracing non-violence. Further, he preached about establishing Jain temples, installing icons of Tirthankaras, and worshipping them regularly. Everyone regretted their acts of violence the moment his sermon ended. All residents of the town, along with King Uppaldeva accepted Jainism wholeheartedly.

=== Ratnaprabhasuri's debate with Brahmins ===
Shaiva Brahmins were infuriated looking at the influence of Ratnaprabhasuri on the residents of the town. They demanded a Śāstrārtha (transl. debate on religious ideologies and scriptures). Ratnaprabhasuri and his 35 disciples agreed to it. The Brahmins began by stating the lack of devotion in Jains and questioning Jainism's antiquity. Ratnaprabhasuri's disciple Vīrdhawalopādhyāya countered this claim by stating accounts of Jainism in the Brahmin scriptures. Ratnaprabhasuri concluded the debate stating that they have no benefit in people accepting or rejecting Jainism and that it is their moral duty to spread the word of Jainism. Brahmins eventually lost the debate and the entire town converted to Jainism. Several Jain temples were established several icons were consecrated. Ratnaprabhasuri also wrote several non-canonical scriptures such as Tattvamimansa, Tattvavichār etc.

=== Establishment of Osian's 'Mahavira Temple' ===
Osiyan Mahavira Swami Śvetāmbara Jaina Temple

Uppaladeva's minister Uhada was already establishing a temple dedicated to Vishnu. However, the construction was being hindered. Ratnaprabhasuri suggested him to construct it with Mahavira as the principal deity. The temple was ready. The residents of the town asked Ratnaprabhasuri about an icon to consecrate. He knew that Chamunda was preparing one using sand and the milk of a cow, so he asked the residents to keep patience. According to scriptural and local legends, one day, the cowherd saw his cow discharging milk at a part in the village. He informed Minister Uhada and the latter dug the land there. He found an idol of the 24th Tirthankara Mahavira. They urged Ratnaprabhasuri to consecrate this idol in the temple. However, the preceptor knew that the idol was unfinished and needed 7 more days to be completely sculpted by the demi-goddess. However, looking at the excitement and devotion among the people, he allowed digging and taking the idol out. Chamunda was angered by this and forced every householder to sacrifice one goat and every household to sacrifice one buffalo every day during the 9 days of the Navaratri.

=== Conversion of Chāmundā into 'Sacchiya Mātā' ===
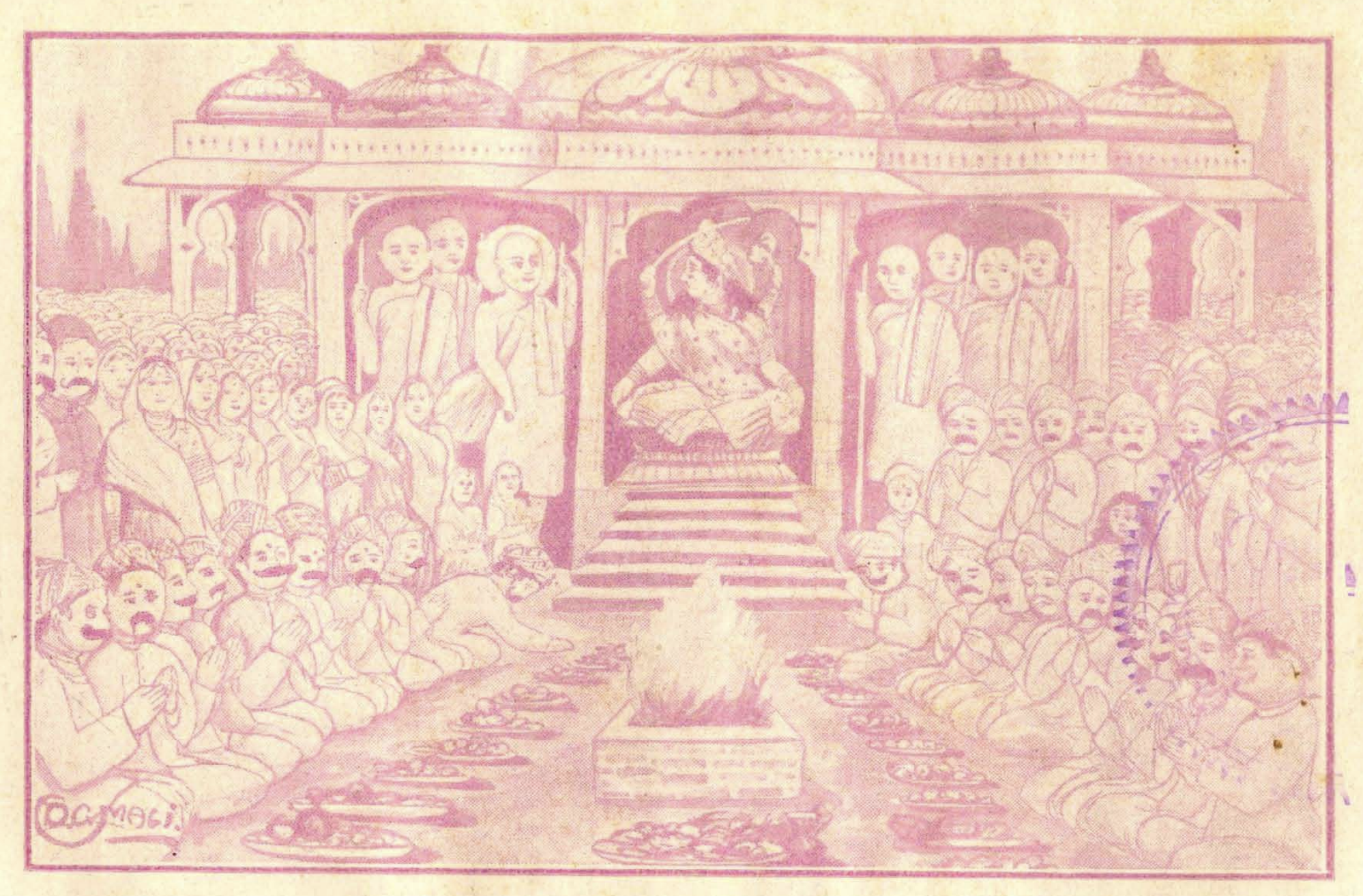
Ratnaprabhasuri converts Chamunda into Sacciya Mata

After a lengthy sermon by Ratnaprabhasuri, Chāmundā realized that violence was not the correct way and attained the Ratnatraya. She became a samyaktvi (one of right faith, knowledge, and conduct) demi-goddess. She was renamed to Sacchiya Mātā by Ratnaprabhasuri and was consecrated as the adhiśthāyikā (transl. protecting deity) of the Mahavira Jain temple, Osian. A shrine dedicated to her was also constructed on the small hill where Ratnaprabhasuri had performed penance. Later, the idol of Mahavira was consecrated.

=== Establishment of the 'Oswāl clan' ===
The residents of the town insisted upon Ratnaprabhasuri to name their clan different from Śrīmalis and Porvāls. Ratnaprabhasuri named the clan Oswāl. They were strict adherents of the Śvetāmbara sect. A poetic version of the legend was also written by a later monk belonging to the Upkeśa Gaccha.

== Death and legacy ==
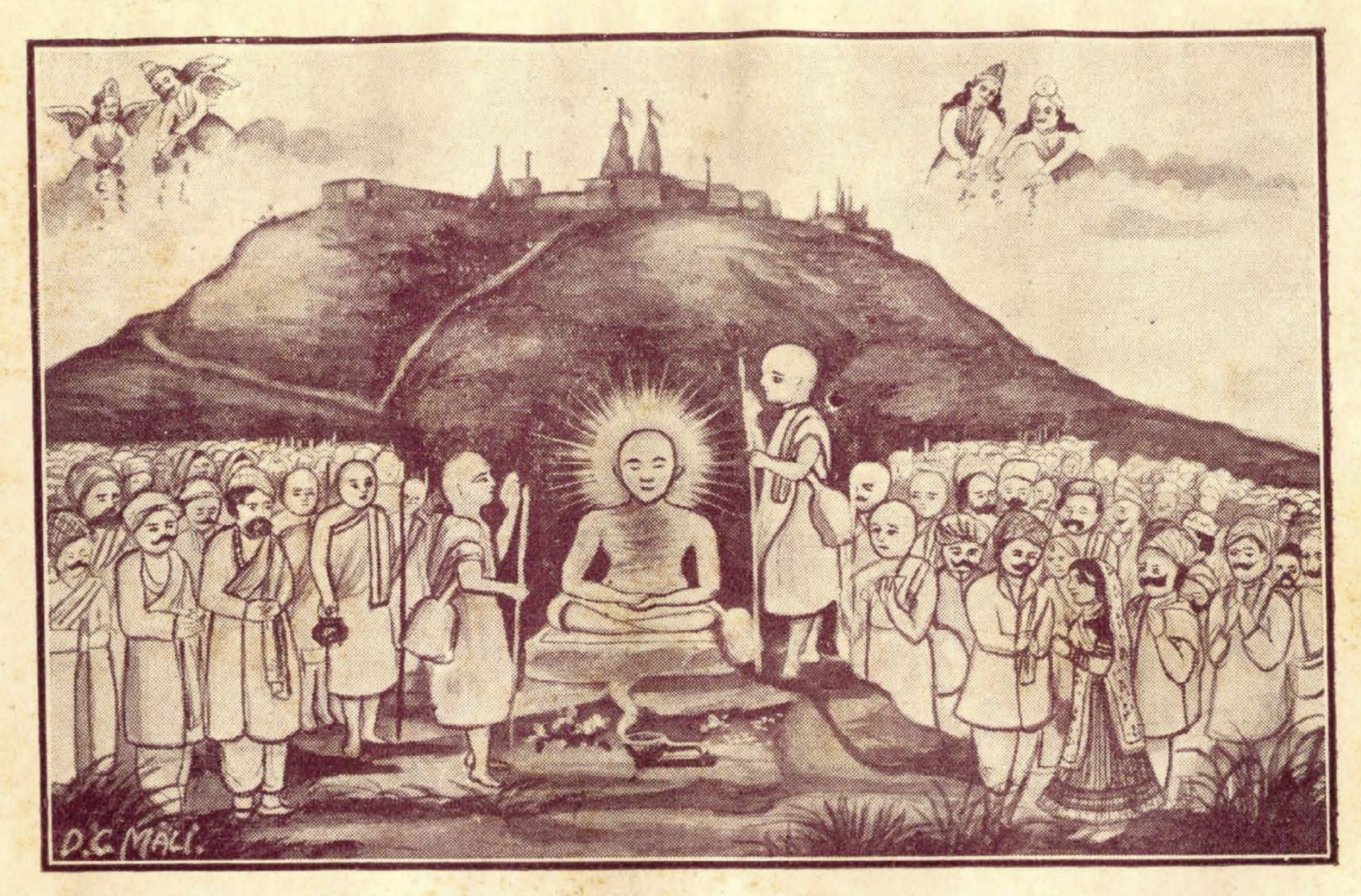
Ratnaprabhasuri fasts and dies at Palitana

Just like his preceptor Swayamprabhasuri, he went to Palitana and performed Sallekhana and died after a month-long fast at the age of 84 in 443 BC. Before he died, he consecrated Vīrdhawalopādhyāya as the next head of the monastic order of Upkeśa Gaccha and named him Yakshadevasuri. Ratnaprabhasuri is the subject of several non-canonical Śvetāmbara scriptures such as Ratnaprabhasuri's (a later monk and not the subject of this article) "Upkeśa Gaccha Caritra" (transl. Biography of the Upkeśa Gaccha) as well as the pattavali of Upkeśa Gaccha that is mentioned in Vijayanandsuri's Ajnāna-timira-bhāskara, which was also translated by renowned Indologist and professor A. F. Rudolph Hoernle. These and other similar biographical scriptures called pattavali caritras describe his ascetic life and life as a king in great detail. It is said that Ratnaprabhasuri was one of the most impactful Śvetāmbara Jain monks, given the success of the Oswal clan.

Several scholars have studied his life, seeing him as a crucial figure in the history and culture of Jainism because he is considered to be the founder of the Oswāl clan. Today, roughly three-fourths of Śvetāmbara Jains belong to the Oswāl clan.

His monastic lineage and ancestry came to be known as Upkeśa Gaccha only after his efforts at Osian, which was also known as Upkeśapattan or Upkeśapur.

In veneration to him, his footprints have been installed at Dilwara Temples and Mahavira Jain temple, Osian.

== See also ==
- Uttaradhyayana Sutra
- Tapa Gaccha
- Hiravijayasuri
- Sudharmaswami
