= Dunedin Academic Press =

Academic publisher in Edinburgh, Scotland

Dunedin Academic Press Ltd (Dunedin) was a small independent academic publisher in Edinburgh, Scotland which published books for the tertiary (undergraduate) level and periodically for postgraduate/research audiences. Dunedin also published books appealing to non-specialist adults interested in learning more about earth sciences, particularly geology.

Dunedin's list of publications was acquired by Liverpool University Press on 1 January 2024.
