= Osian, Rajasthan =

Osian Uvasisala, Ukesa and Upkesapur-pattana
- Town
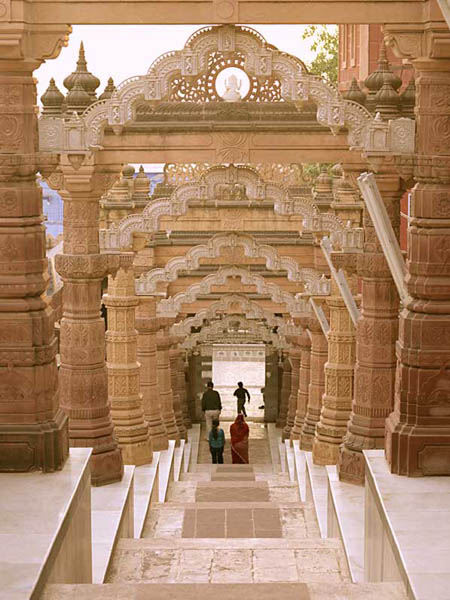
- Sachiya Mata Temple, Osian
- Nickname: Bhubaneswar of Rajasthan
- Location in Rajasthan, India Osian (India)
- Coordinates: 26.7167°N 72.9167°E
- Country: India
- State: Rajasthan
- District: Jodhpur
- Tehsil: Osian

Area
  - Total: 10.4306 km^{2} (4.0273 sq mi)
  - Rank: 1
- Elevation: 323 m (1,060 ft)

Population (2011)
  - Total: 12,548

Languages
  - Official: Hindi
- Time zone: UTC+5:30 (IST)
- PIN: 342303
- Telephone code: +91-2922
- Vehicle registration: RJ-19

Osian (also spelt Osiyan) is an ancient town located in the Jodhpur District of Rajasthan state in western India. It is an oasis in the Thar Desert. The town is a panchayat village and the headquarters for Osian tehsil. It lies 69 km (43 mi) by road north of the district headquarters at Jodhpur, on a diversion off the main Jodhpur – Bikaner Highway. The under-construction Amritsar Jamnagar Expressway passes through this town.

Osian is famous as home to the cluster of ruined Hindu and Jain temples dating from the 8th to 12th century AD. The city was a major religious centre of the kingdom of Marwar during the Gurjara Pratihara dynasty. Of the 18 shrines in the group, the Surya Temple, Sachiya Mata Temple, Katan Bawari and the Jain temple dedicated to Mahavira stands out in their grace and architecture.

The town was a major trading center at least as early as the Gupta period. It maintained this status, while also being a major center of Hinduism and Jainism for hundreds of year. This came to an abrupt end when the town was attacked by the armies of Muhammed of Ghor in 1195. Osian is a famous tourist destination.

== History ==
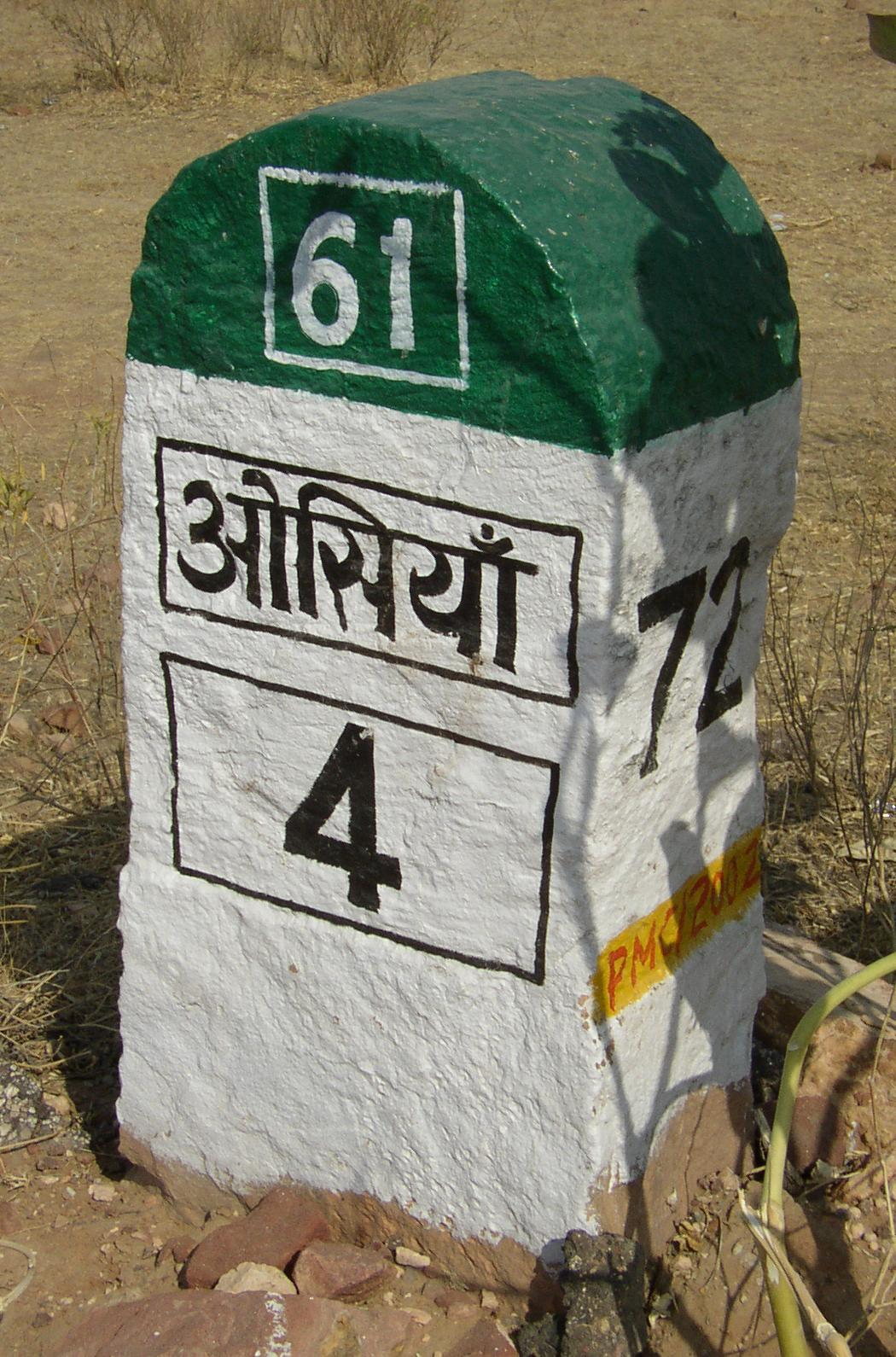
Kilometre sign

Evidence suggests that Osian is a very old settlement. Some of its early names include Uvasisala, Ukesa and Upkesapur-pattana. In its early history, the village was a center for Brahmanism. It was a major stop for camel caravans during the Gupta period. The town was an important center for the Pratihar dynasty. Tradition states that, after being abandoned for a time, the village was re-established by Utpaladeva (c. 900-950). Utpaladeva converted to Jainism, and turned the village into a center for the religion. However, Jainism had a presence in the village long before that. The town was prosperous and successful at this time. At its peak, it had over three hundred Jain temples.

Muhammad of Ghor and his Turkish and Muslim armies attacked the town in 1195. The people of the city fled during these attacks. Most of the city, and most of its temples, were destroyed. After this attack, the residents did not return, and the city became deserted.

The Jain Harivamsa Purana refers to Vatsaraja's rule in Saka year 705 (A.D. 783). It is believed that he was highly influential in Upakesapura (Osian), as inscriptions of Vikram Samvat dating back to 1013 (A.D. 956), and referring to this place, have been found.

== Religion ==
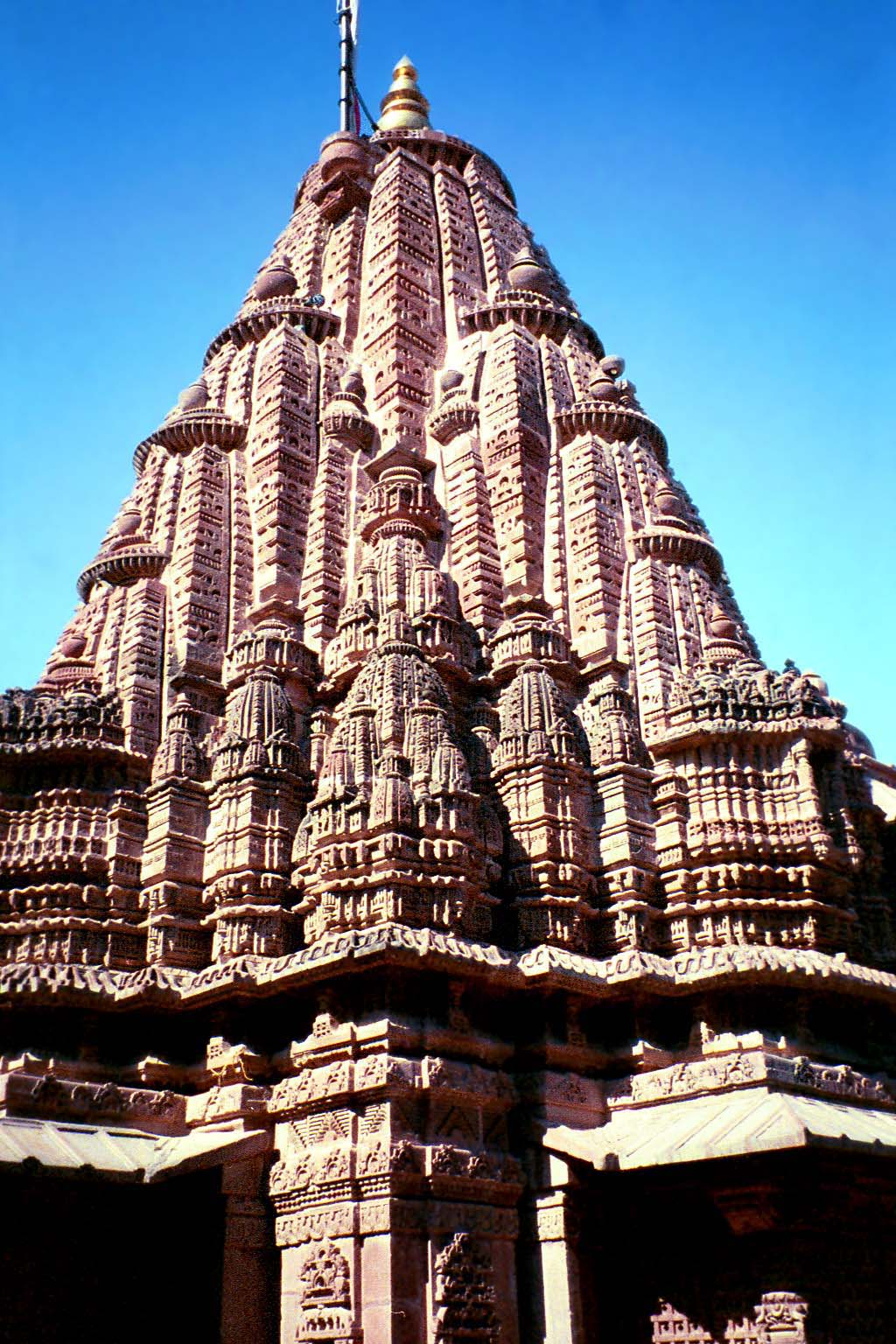
Shikhar of Mahaviraji temple, Osian

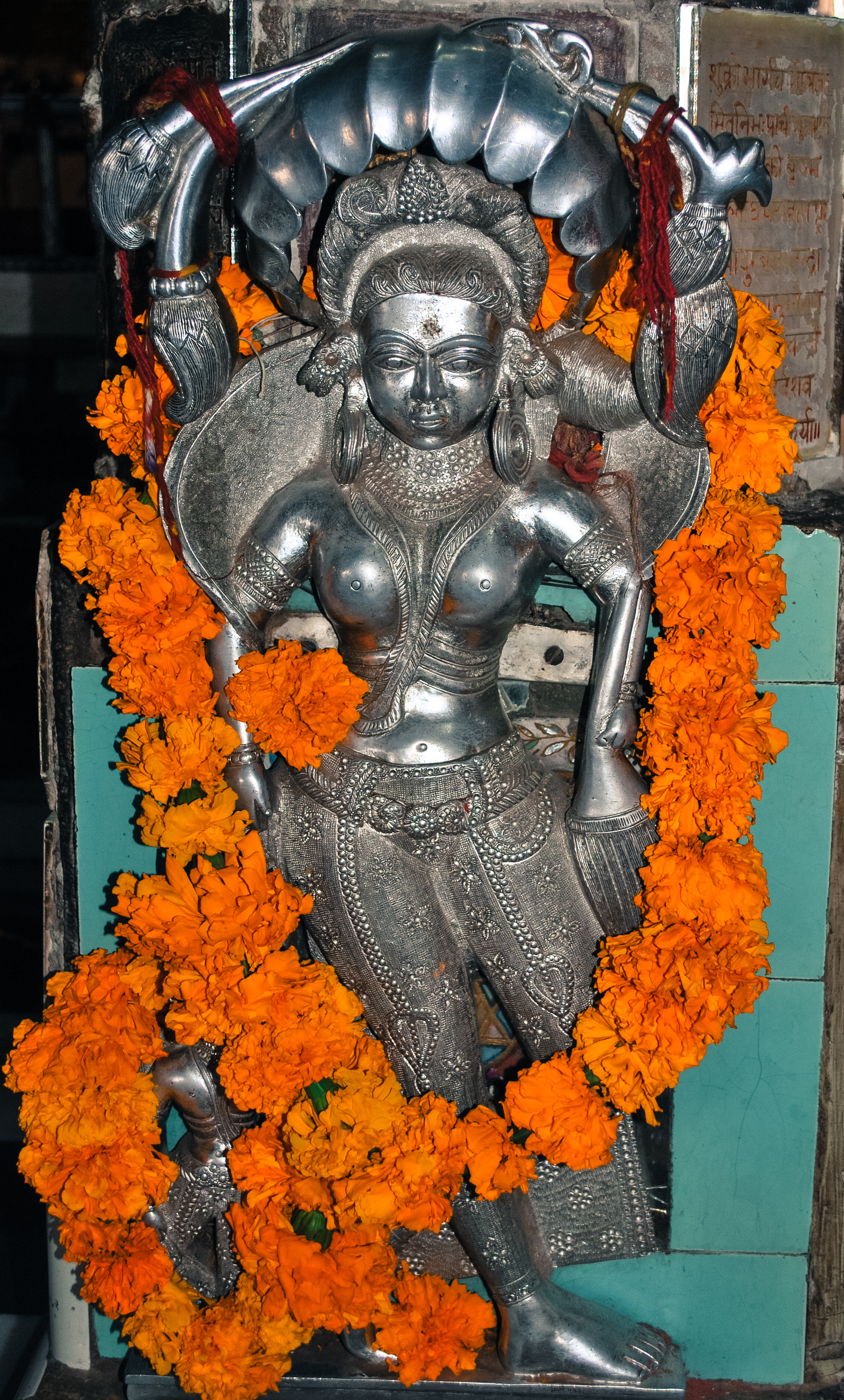
Goddess Osian Idol

It is believed from several pieces of evidence that the people of Osian become Jain by Acharya Ratnaprabhasuri, who had impressed the populace of the region with his supernatural powers.

The Mahavira Temple is an important tirtha for Jains. According to an inscription found at Sachiya Mata Temple dating back to 956 A.D., it was built during the Gurjara-Pratihara dynasty by King Vatsaraja in 783 AD, making it the oldest surviving Jain temple in Western India. According to Jain legends, Acharya Ratnaprabhasuri in (c. 457 BCE) restored the life of son of a prominent brahman following this even the villagers converted to Jainism and this place for origination of Oswal community. Witnessing the power of Ratnaprabhasuri Goddess Chamunda was compelled to become a Jain vegetarian deity and became the protector deity of the temple, protecting devotees who worship image of Mahavira in the temple. Ratnaprabhasuri then named her Sachiya Mata as she truthfully advised Ratnaprabhasuri to stay in Osian during Chaturmas.

Osian is an important Jain pilgrimage center for the Maheshwari and Oswal Jain communities. The (Mahavira, महावीर) Temple, built here in A.D. 783, is an important tirtha for Jains built by Gurjara Pratihara King Vatsaraja.

The Sachiya Mata Temple also equally old and important situated on a hill north-east of Mahavira Temple, enable us some clues to understand the social history of that period. This Temple was built by Utpaldev who is the brother of Raja Punj the son of King 'Bheemsain' (king of Bhinmal). This has many decorative features of a Jain temple and its construction can be attributed to Jains. Jains worship this deity as a samyaktvi (transl. one who has Ratnatraya) goddess and as protector of the land, of their clan of Oswals and of the Mahavira Jain temple, Osian.

The Shingavi, Baid, Bafna, Lunawat, Tated, Parekh, Karnavat and many other clans of Jain community conduct their 'Mundan-Sanskar' in Sachiya Mata Temple.

== Demographics ==
In the 2011 India census, Osian reported 12,548 inhabitants, 6,572 of whom were male and 5,976 of female, which gave a gender ratio of 909 females per thousand males.

== Transport ==
The nearest airport is at Jodhpur Airport. State Highway 61 passes through Osian. Osiyan railway station is on the Jodhpur–Jaisalmer line of North Western Railway.

== Gallery ==
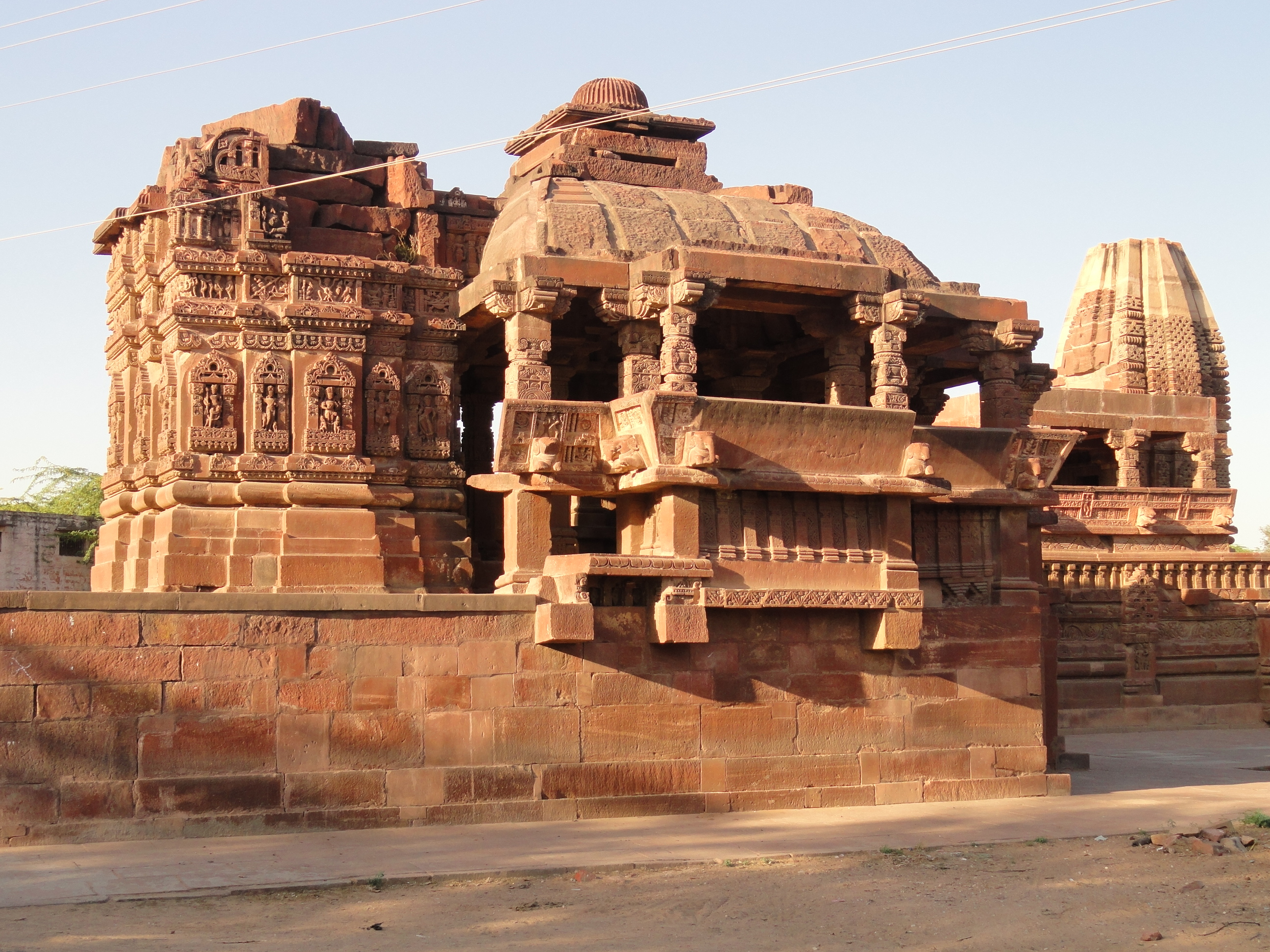
Monument at Osian

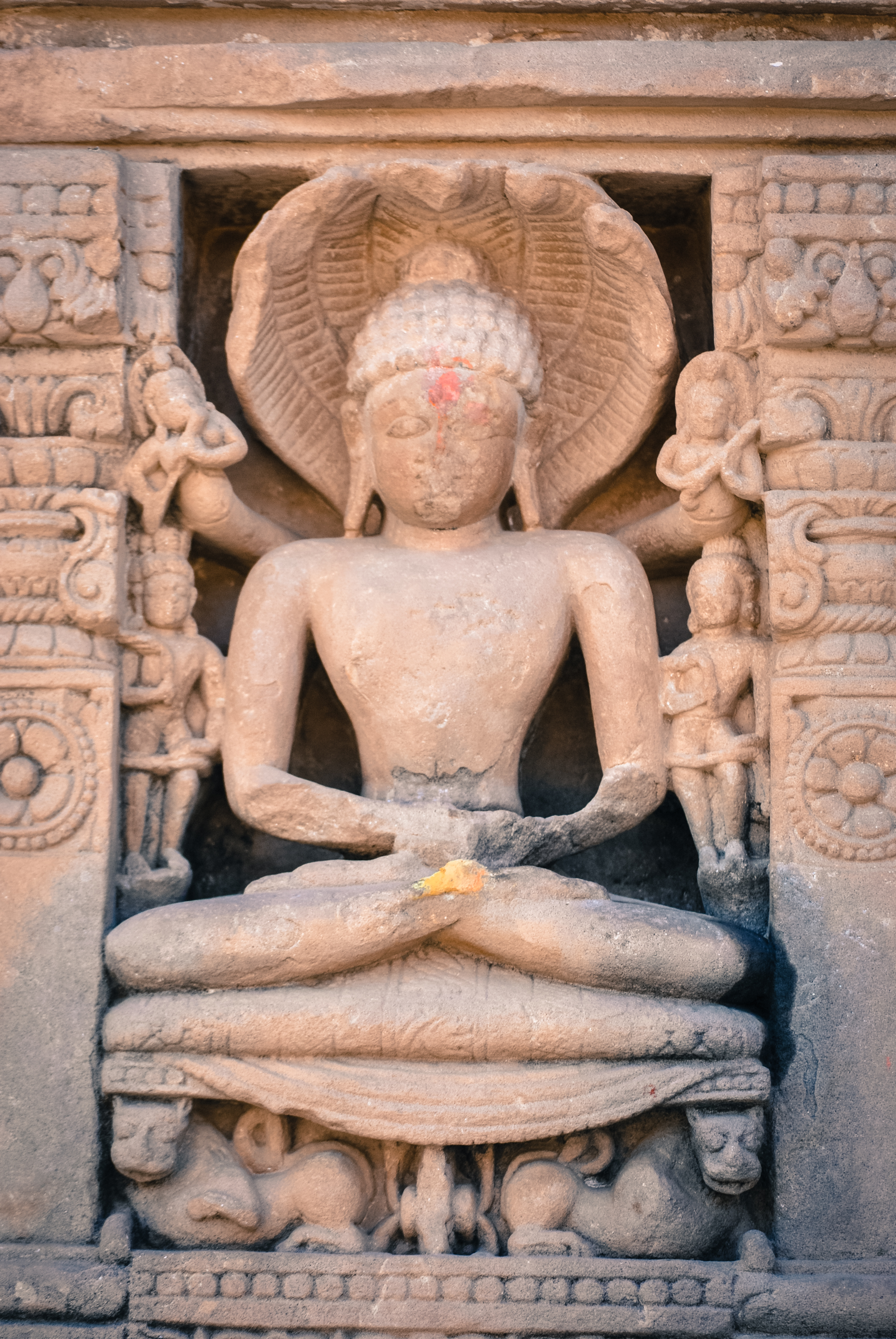
Parshvanath statue

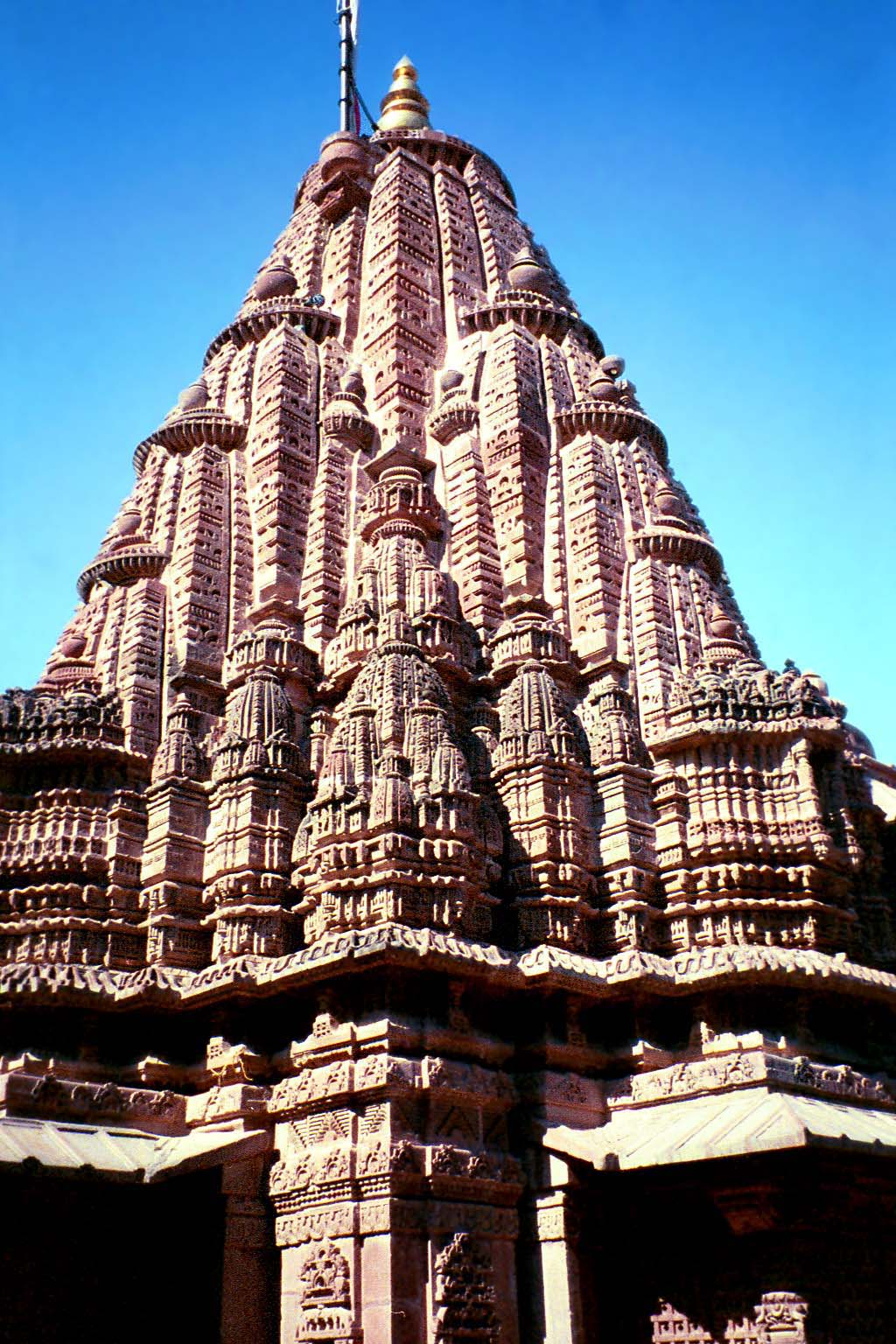
Shikhar of Mahavira Jain temple, Osian

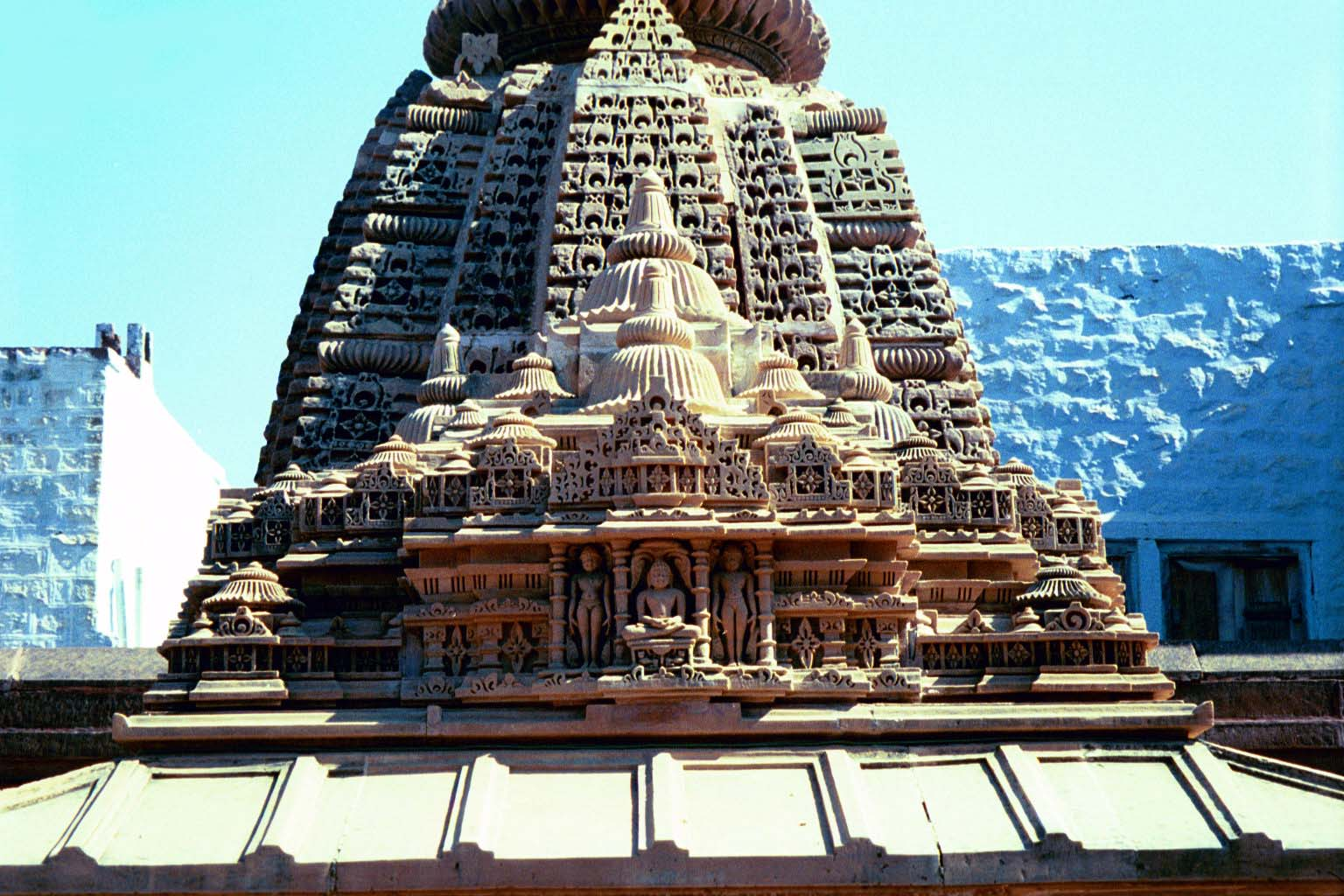
Top of Jain Temple

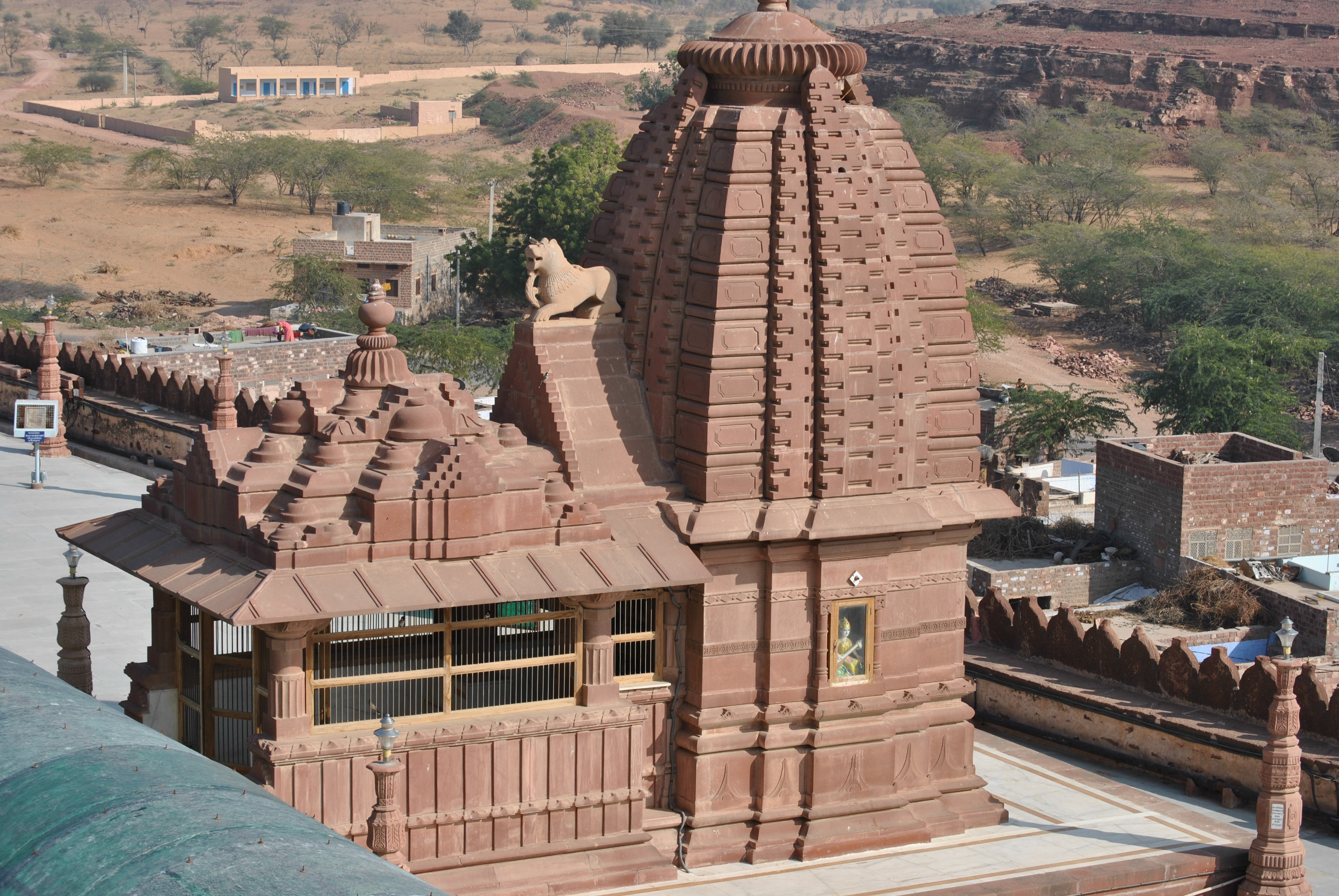
Jain Temple in Osian

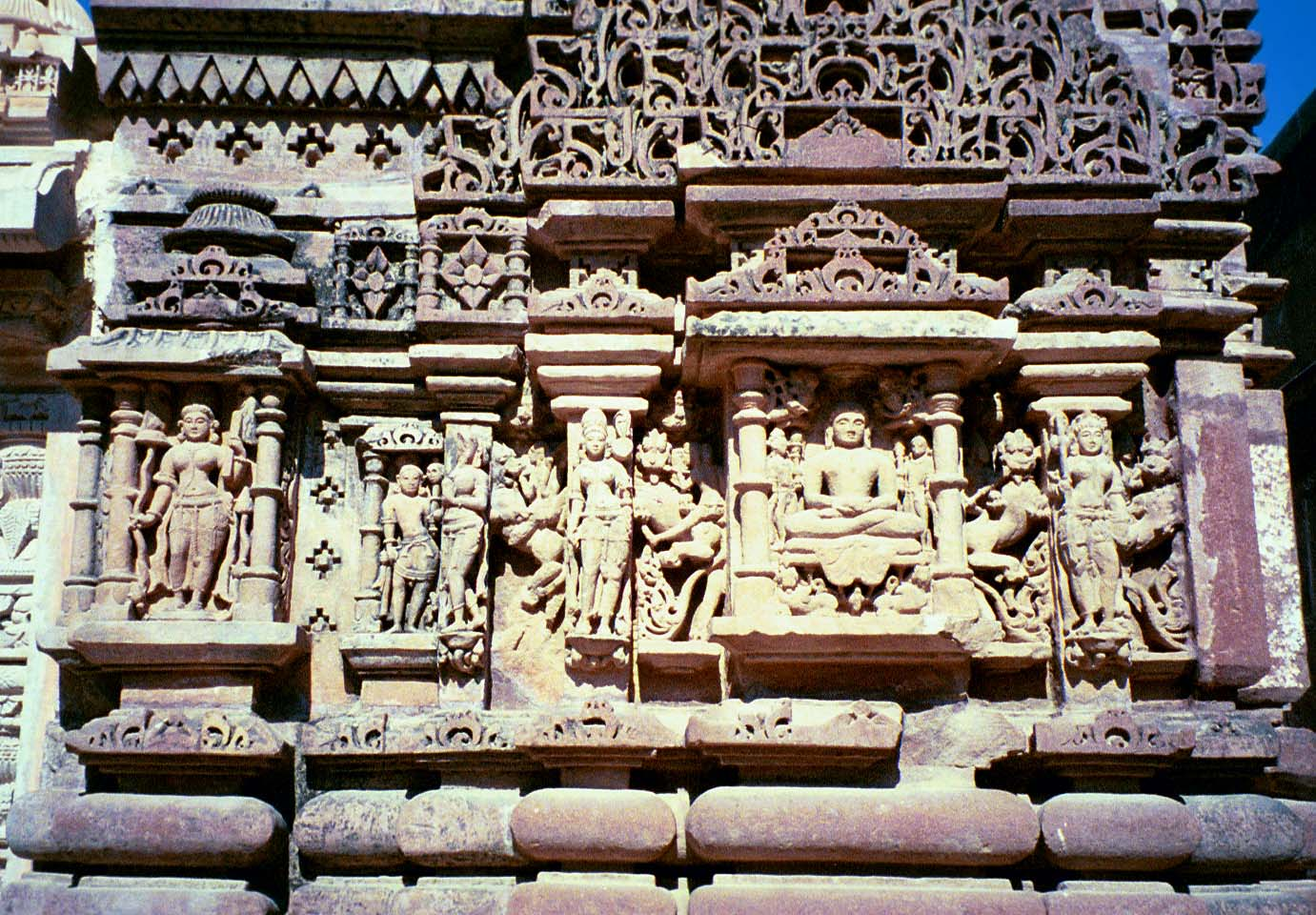
Carving on the walls of Osian Jain temple

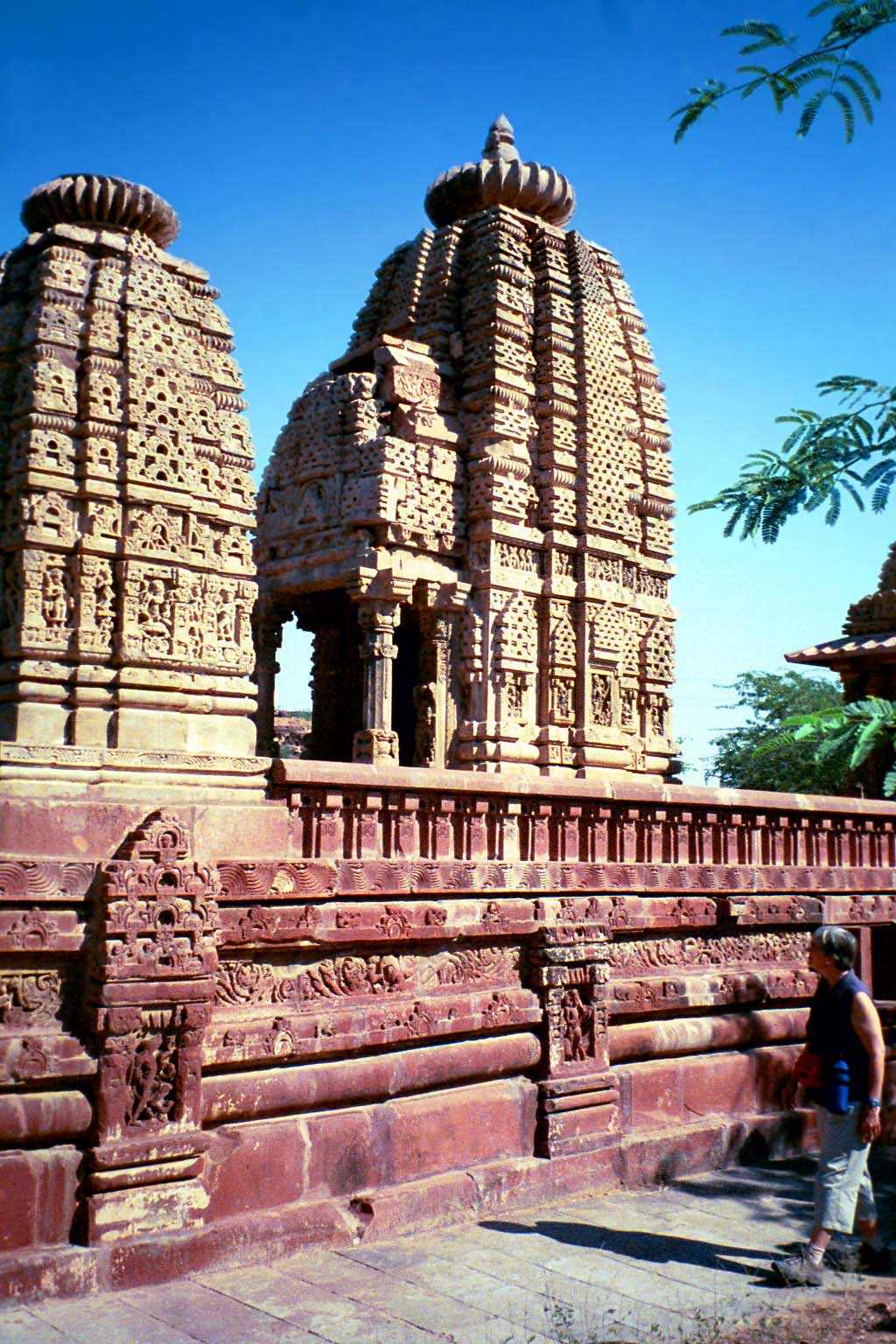
Harihara temple

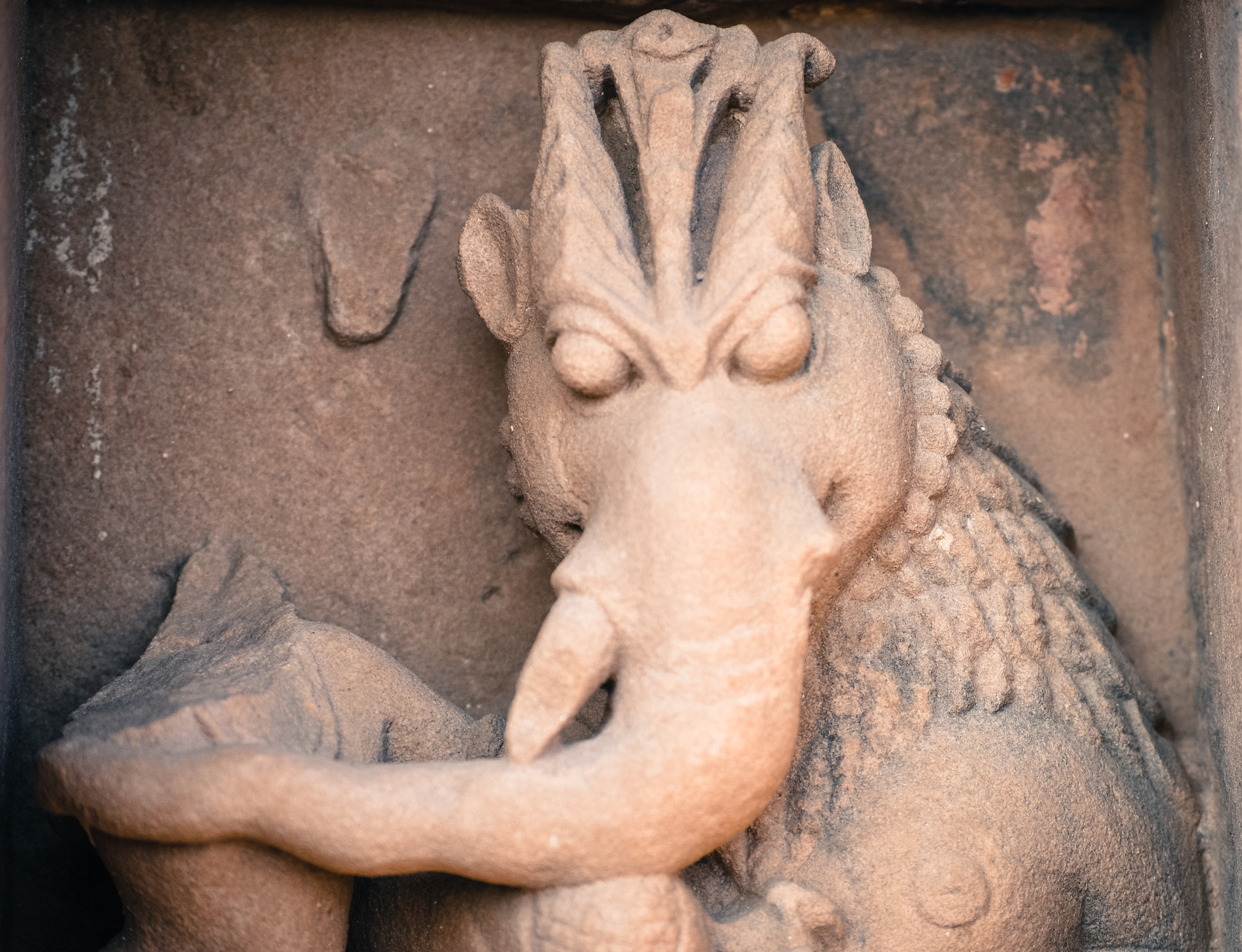
Elephant Carving on wall

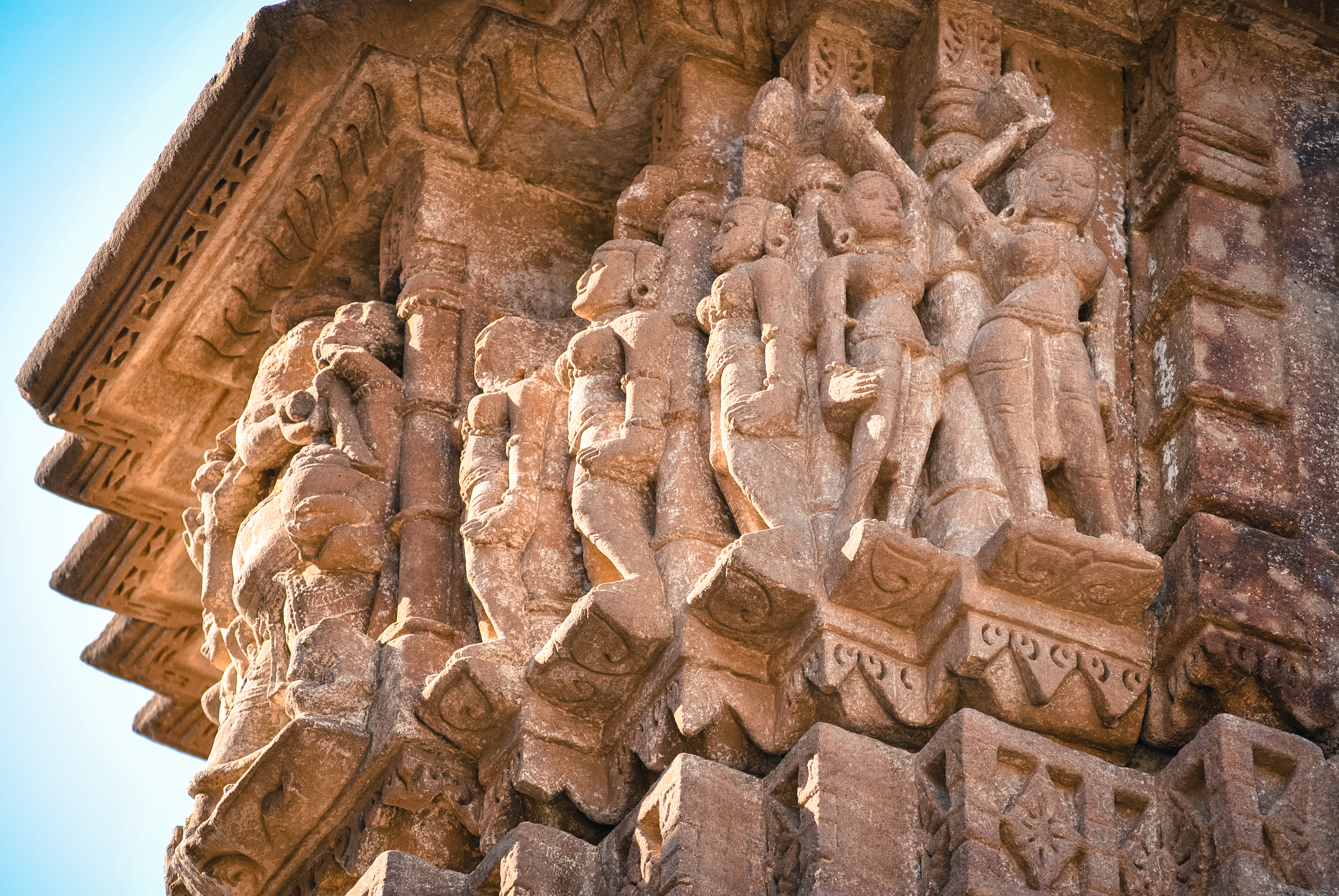
Osiya temple and Architecture

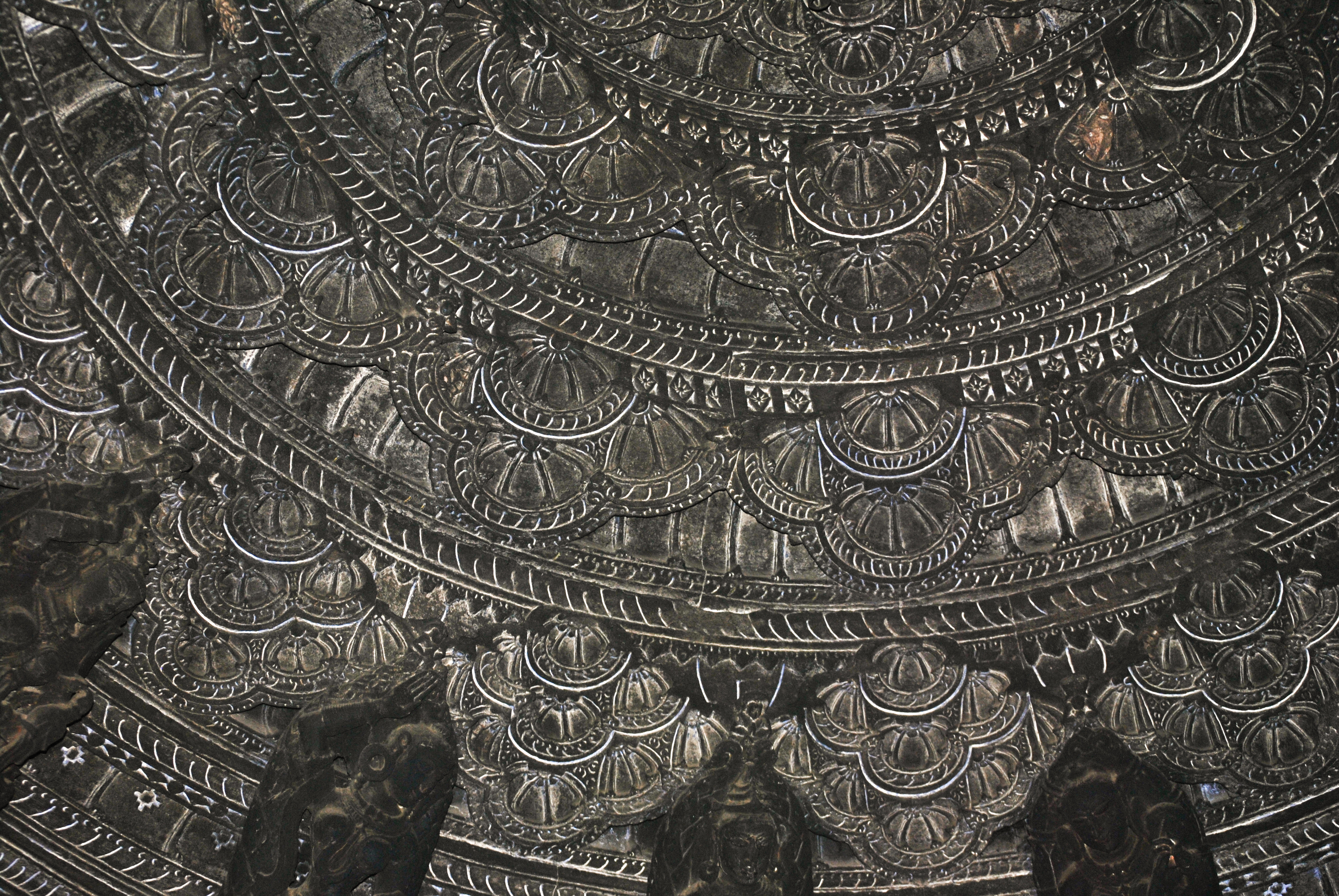
Inside the main temple

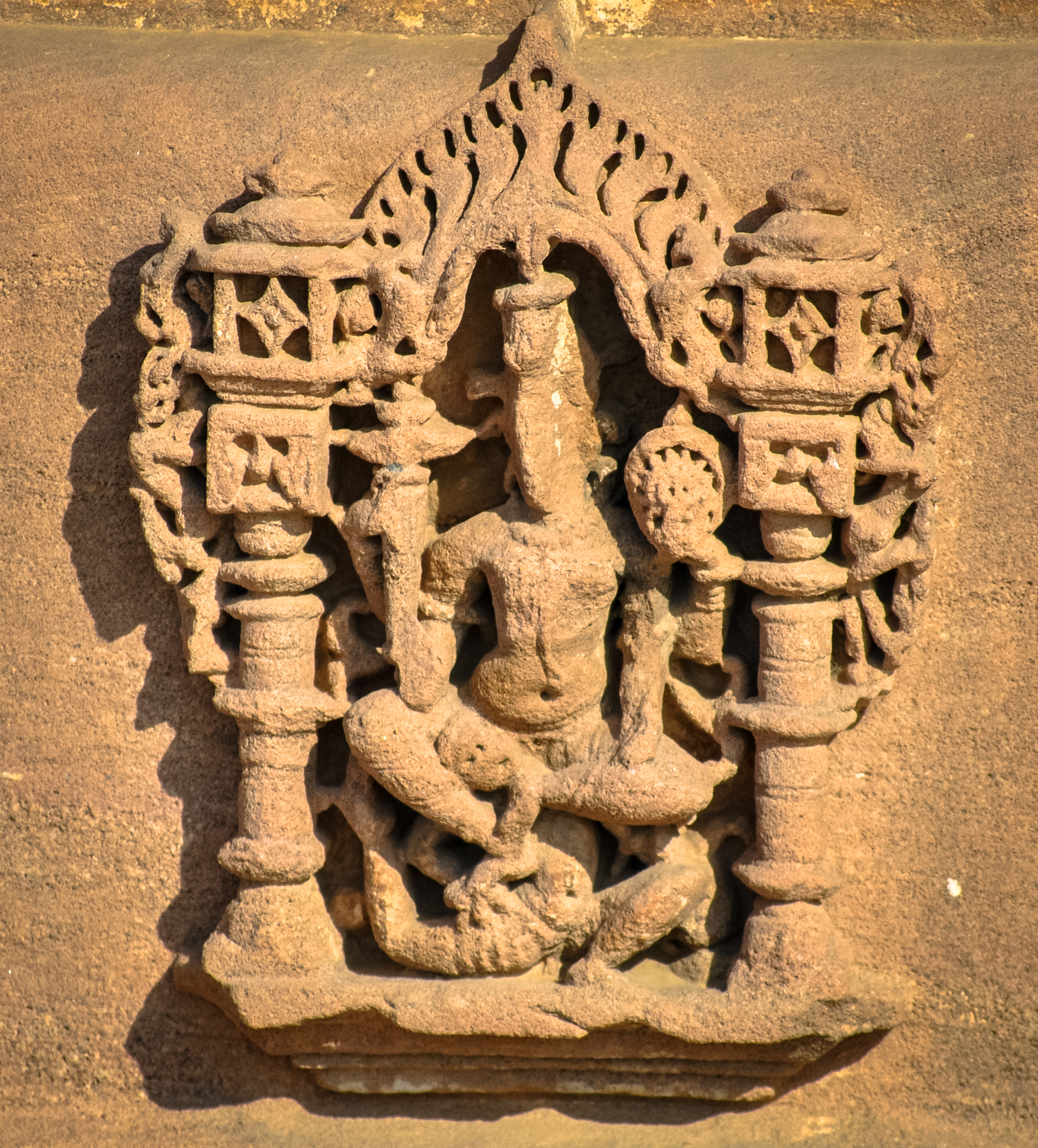
Sculpture inside the temple

Jain temple in Osian, 1897

== See also ==
- Oswal
- Bhinmal
- Mandore
- Swayamprabhasuri

== Sources ==
- Babb, Lawrence A. (10 August 2004). Alchemies of Violence: Myths of Identity and the Life of Trade in Western India. New Delhi: SAGE Publishing. ISBN 9788132103219.
- Babb, Lawrence A. (28 May 2015). Understanding Jainism. Understanding Faith. Dunedin Academic Press. ISBN 9781780465357.
- Bose, Melia Belli (25 August 2015). Royal Umbrellas of Stone: Memory, Politics, and Public Identity in Rajput Funerary Art. Brill's Indological Library. New Delhi: Brill Publishers. ISBN 9789004300569.
- Cort, John E. (1998). Open Boundaries: Jain Communities and Cultures in Indian History. SUNY Press. ISBN 9780791437865.
- Dundas, Paul (2002) [1992]. The Jains (Second ed.). London and New York: Routledge. ISBN 978-0-415-26605-5.
- Hassan, Syed Siraj ul (1989). The Castes and Tribes of H.E.H. the Nizam's Dominions. Vol. 1. Asian Educational Services. ISBN 9788120604889.
- Kalia, Asha (1982). Art of Osian Temples: Socio-economic and Religious Life in India, 8th-12th Centuries A.D. Abhinav Publications. ISBN 9780391025585.
- Panikar, Agustin (2010). Jainism: History, Society, Philosophy and Practice. Lala Sunder Lal Jain research series. Vol. 24. Delhi: Motilal Banarsidass. ISBN 978-81-208-3460-6.
- Qvarnström, Olle (2010). Jainism and Early Buddhism: Essays in Honor of Padmanabh S. Jaini. Jain Publishing Company. ISBN 978-0-89581-956-7.
