= Osian tehsil =

- Tehsil
- Location of Osian Tehsil in Jodhpur Rural district
- Country: India
- State: Rajasthan
- District: Jodhpur District
- Headquarters: Osian

Osian tehsil is a tehsil in Jodhpur District of Rajasthan state in western India. Headquarters for the tehsil is the town of tiwari

Osian tehsil is the most central of the eleven tehsils in Jodhpur District. It borders Phalodi tehsil to the northwest and north, Nagaur District to the northeast, Bhopalgarh tehsil and Bawadi tehsil to the southeast, Mandor tehsil to the south; and Balesar tehsil to the west.

== Villages ==
There are forty-one panchayat villages in Osian tehsil.
