= List of Jain monks =

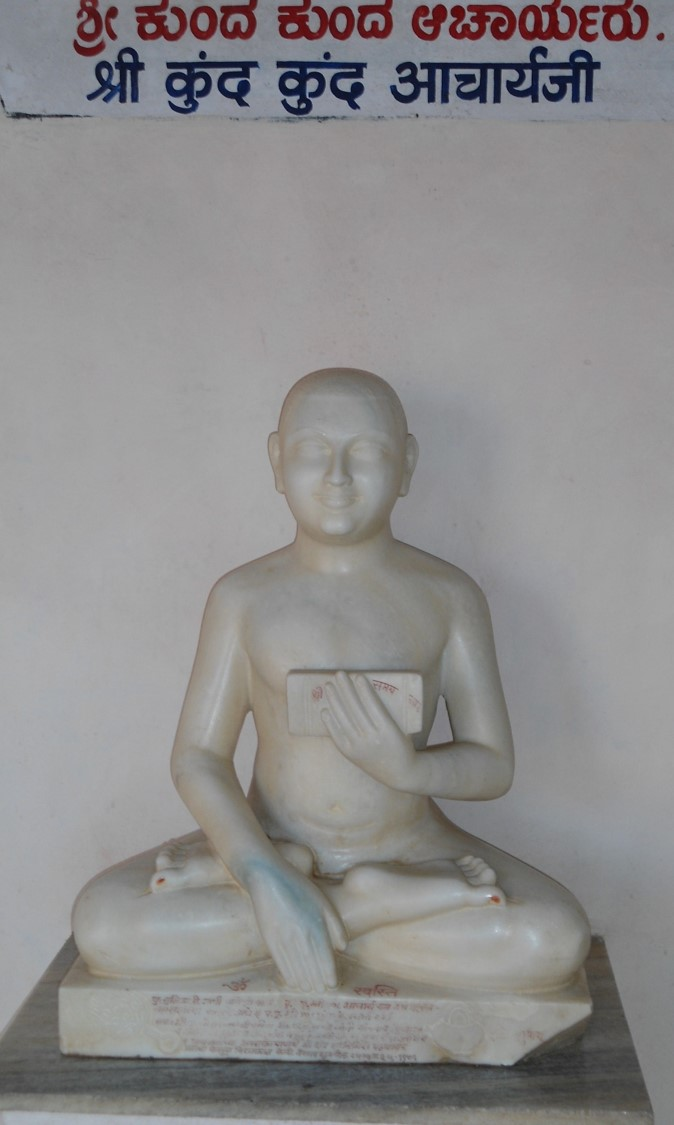
Idol of Kundakunda, the most revered Digambara acharya

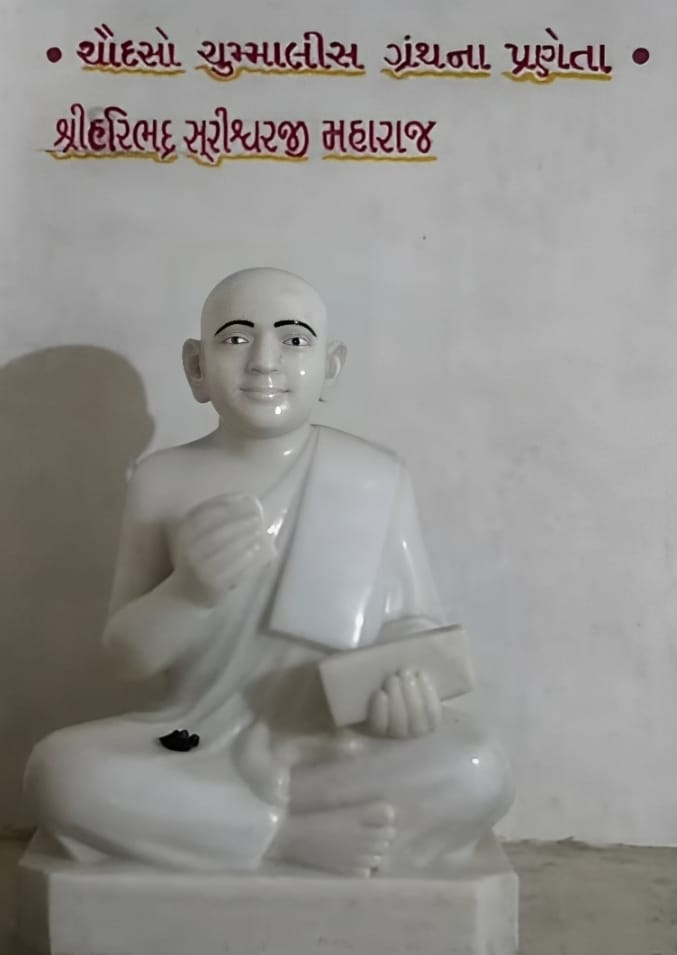
Author of 1444 volumes and the most revered Śvetāmbara Acharya: Yākini Mahattarā Srunu Acharya Haribhadrasuri Ji Maharaja

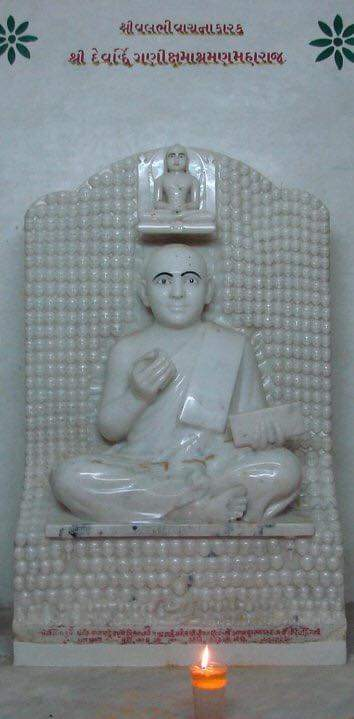
Idol of Devardhi Ksamashramana at vallabhi tirth, the most revered Śvetāmbara acharya

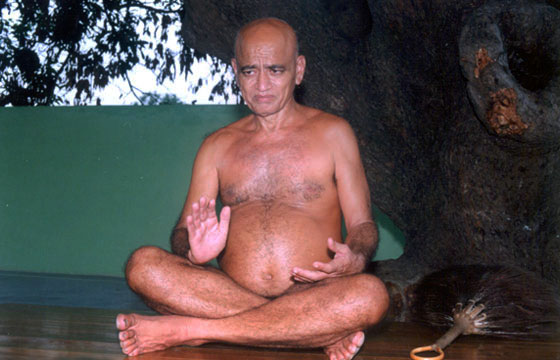
Vidyasagar (Jain monk)

This is a list of Jain ascetics. The list include the names of ascetics who are known for their contributions to Jain philosophy and Jainism in general.

- Indrabhuti Gautama
- Bhadrabahu, c. 4th century BCE. Last acharya of undivided Jain sangha.
- Kundakunda- 1st century BCE
- Sudharma Swami
- Umaswami- Author of the Jain text, Tattvarthsutra
- Mantunga composer of Bhaktamara Stotra recognized by both, Digambar and Śvētāmbara.
- Akalank ji
- Jambuswami

== Digambara ascetics ==
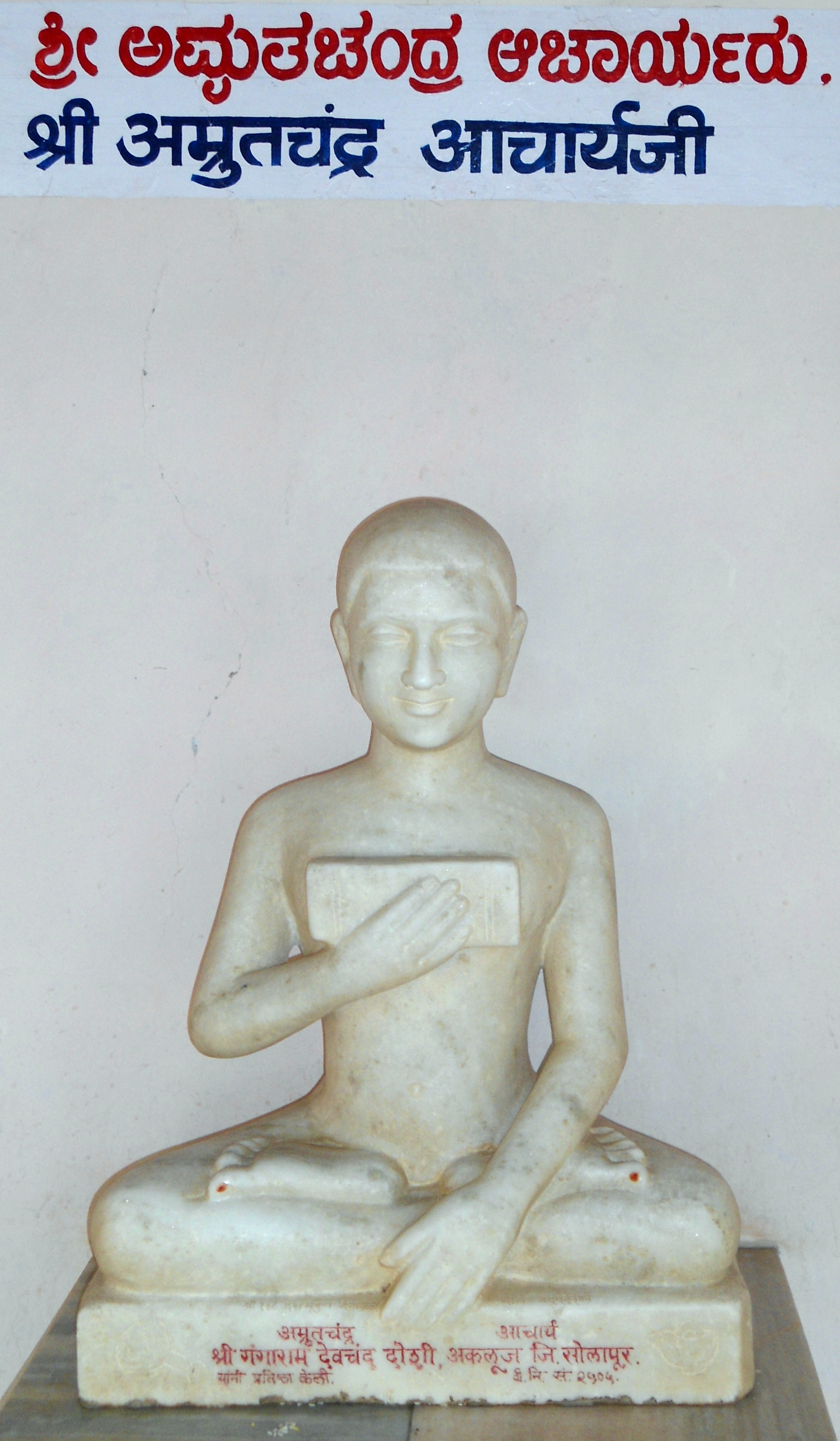
Image of Acharya Amritchandra, author of the Jain text, Puruşārthasiddhyupāya

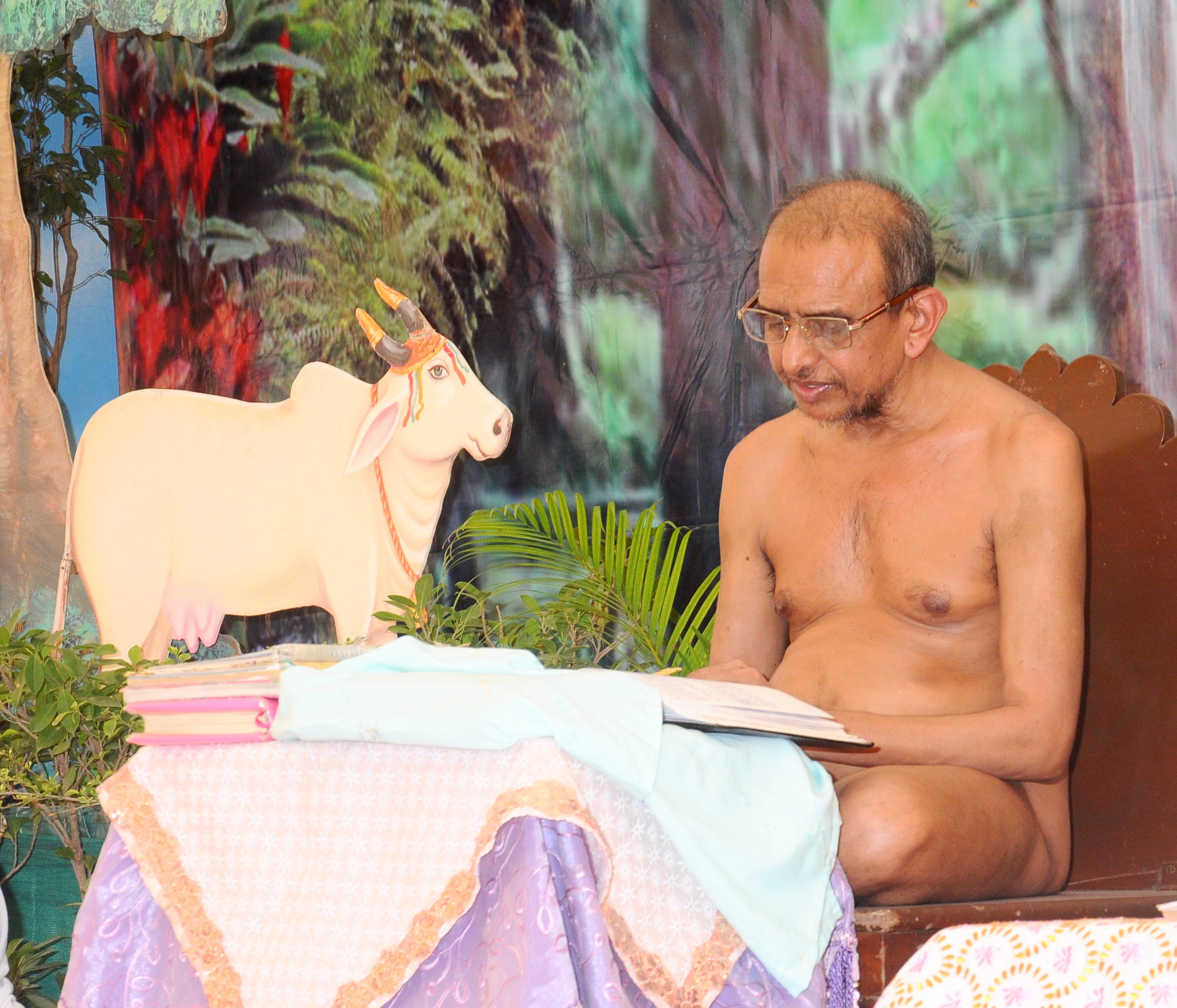
Acharya Gyansagar

- Acharya Samantabhadra - Author of The Ratnakaranda śrāvakācāra, Āpta-mīmāṁsā, Svayambhustotra
- Akalanka, c. 8th century CE. Digambara acharya known for his works on Jain logic.
- Nemichandra Siddhant Chakravarti- Author of Gommatsāra
- Yativṛṣabha- Author of Tiloya Panatti
- Prabhācandra
- Virasena, Digambara, 790–825 CE
- Pujyapada
- Aparajita
- Aryanandi, 20th century Digambara acharya
- Aacharya Aadisagar (1866 – 1944)
- Vidyasagar, Digambara, 1946-2024
- Ganeshprasad Varni, 1874–1961 CE. Digambara. Founder of many Jain Institutions.
- Ilango Adigal
- Jinasena, Digambara, preceptor of the Rashtrakuta rulers, 800–880 CE.
- Jinendra Varni, 1922-1983, author of Jinendra Varni
- Gyansagar
- Kumudendu
- Manatunga composer of Bhaktamara Stotra
- Shantisagar, Digambara, 1872–1955
- Aachary Mahaveerkirti
- Aachary Vimalsagar
- Aachary sanmati sagar (Tapasvi samrat)
- Somadeva Suri
- Acharya Deshbhushan- Jain Acharya of the 20th century
- Acharya Vidyananda - Acharya of the 20th Century
- Aachary sunilsagar
- Tarunsagarji
- Acharya Viraag sagar
- Acharya Vishudh Sagar
- Adikavi Pampa - poet, one of the "three gems of Kannada literature".
- Gyanmati

== Śvētāmbara ascetics ==
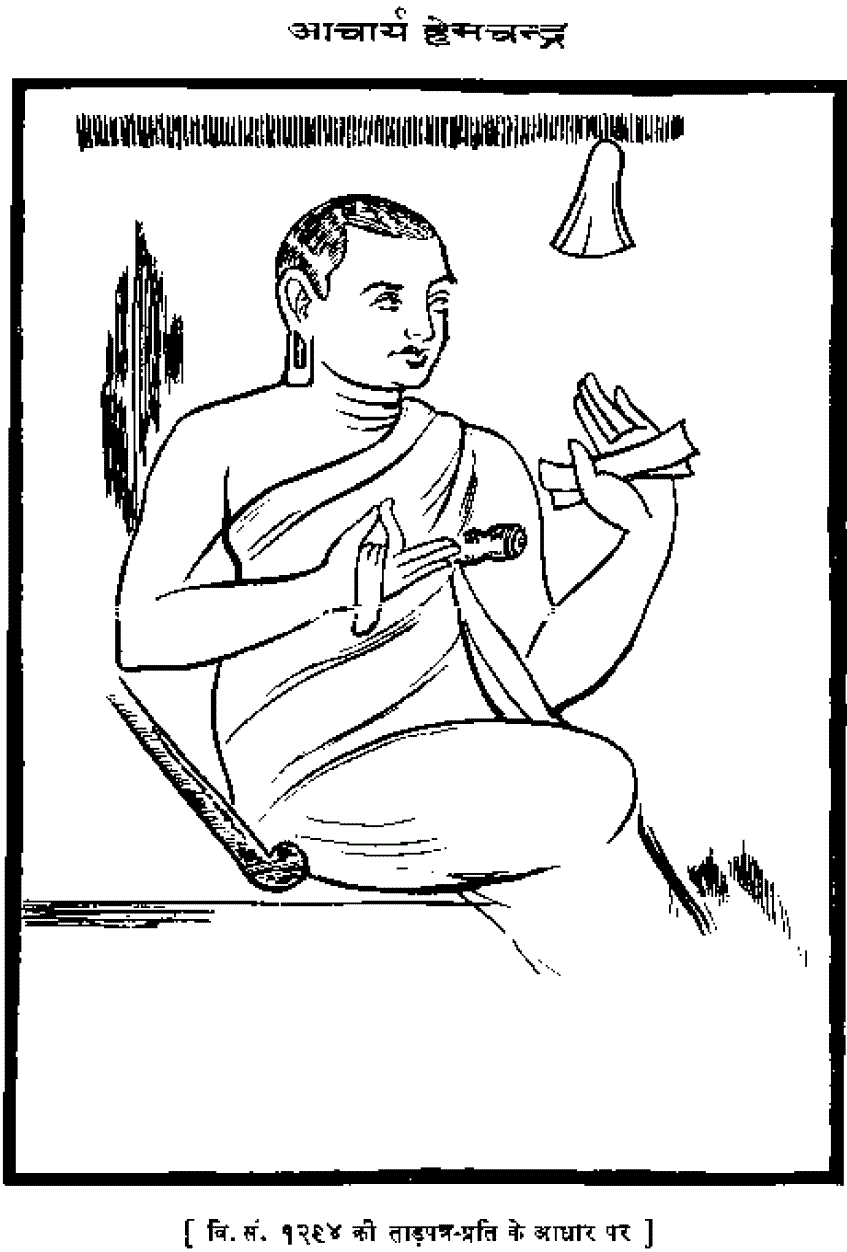
Hemachandra

Drawing of kalikālasarvajña Hemchandra based on Vikram Samvat 1294 palm leaf.

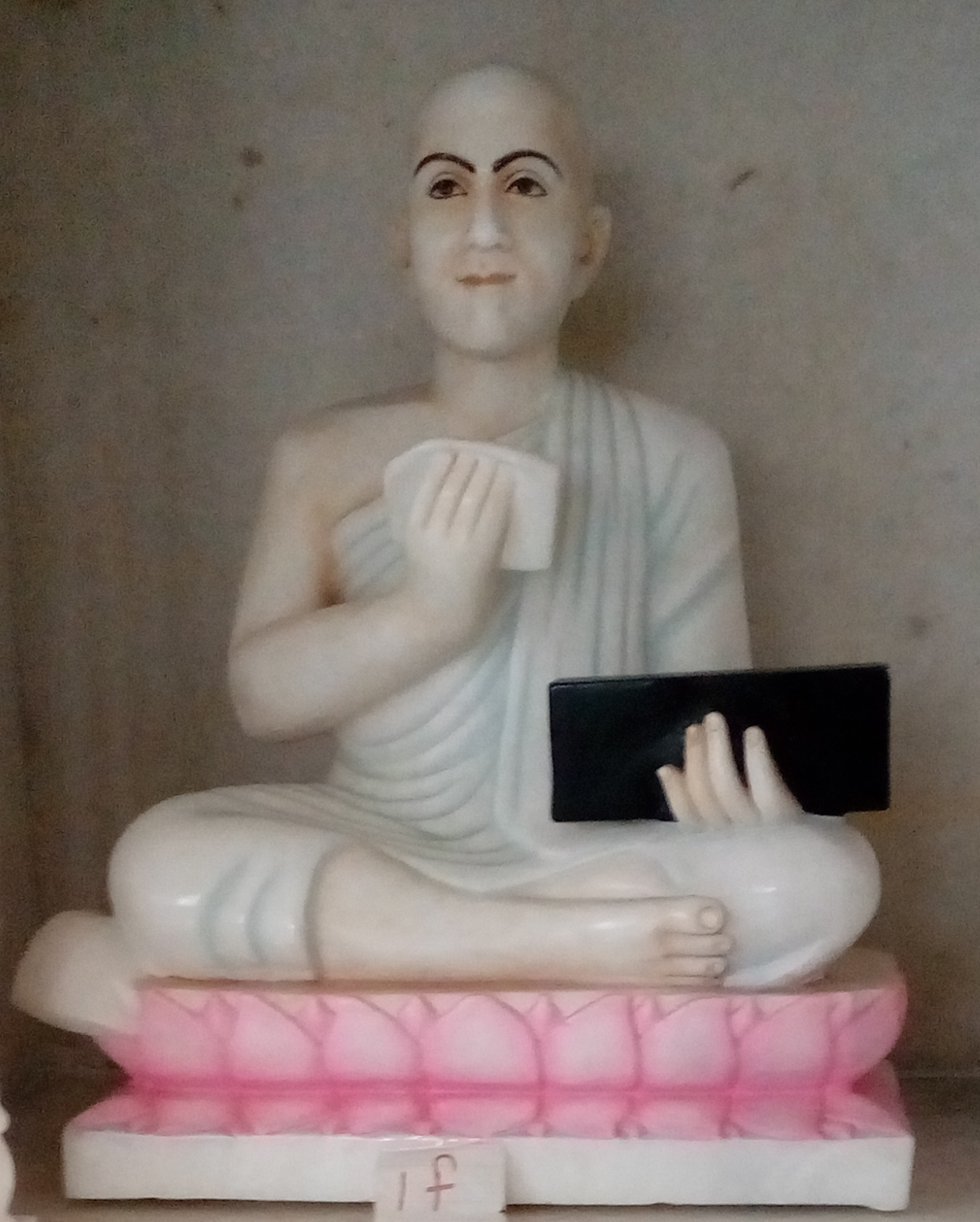
Idol of Mahamahopadhyay Yashovijaya, a seventeenth-century Jain monk, a notable Indian philosopher, logician and prominent author of Jain Scriptures

- Keśiśramanācharya: The 4th monk in the lineage of monastic heads of the Upkeśa Gaccha, the lineage of Parshvanatha.
- Swayamprabhasuri: The 5th successor in the lineage of the monastic heads of the Chaturvidha Sangha's (transl. four-fold congregation) Upkeśa Gaccha. He succeeded Keśiśramanācharya and is believed to have existed in 6th–5th century BC. He is known for establishing the Śrīmali and Porvāl clans of Śvetāmbara Jains.
- Ratnaprabhasuri: The 6th successor in the lineage of the monastic heads of the Chaturvidha Sangha's (transl. four-fold congregation) Upkeśa Gaccha. He succeeded Swayamprabhasuri and is believed to have existed in 6th–5th century BC. He is most well-known as the founder of the Oswāl clan of Śvetāmbara Jains.
- Vimalsuri- a 3rd century Jain monk of the Śvetāmbara Murtipujaka sect. He is best known for his composition "Paumachariyam", the earliest known Jain version of the Ramayana and the oldest work of literature written in Maharashtri Prakrit.
- Devardhi Ksamashramana-Mainly known for his notable contributions revolve around the preservation of Jain scriptures, especially at the second Jain councils of Vallabhi held in 453 AD.
- Siddhasena Divakara-a jain monk of the Śvetāmbara sect in the fifth century CE who wrote works on Jain philosophy and epistemology. He is credited with the authorship of many Jain scriptures. Sanmatitarka (‘The Logic of the True Doctrine’) is the first major Jain work on logic written in Sanskrit. Among the most popular of his works, the Kalyan Mandir Stotra is a Sanskrit hymn dedicated to the 23rd Tirthankara Parshvanatha.
- Hemachandra, a 12th century (c. 1088 – c. 1172/1173 CE) Indian Jain saint, One of the prominent authors of Jain Scriptures, scholar, poet, mathematician, philosopher, yogi, grammarian, law theorist, historian, lexicographer, rhetorician, logician, and prosodist. Noted as a prodigy by his contemporaries, he gained the title kalikālasarvajña, "the knower of all knowledge in his times" and father of the Gujarati language.
- Mahopadhya Yasovijayaji-a seventeenth-century Jain philosopher-monk, was a notable Indian philosopher and logician. He was a thinker, prolific writer and commentator who had a strong and lasting influence on Jainism.
- Vijayanandsuri - Vijayanand Suri also known as Atmaramji of Gujranwala, was the first Swetambar Murtipujaka Jain monk in modern times to receive the title of Acharya. Born and raised in Punjab, he was initiated as a Sthanakvasi monk and later joined the Murtipujaka tradition. He travelled extensively in Gujarat, Rajputana and Punjab; he organised and reformed Jain community, ascetic orders and literature. He wrote several books in Hindi and was invited to the first World Parliament of Religions in 1893 which was attended by Virchand Gandhi later.
- Jambuvijaya
- Vallabhsuri
- Jinaratnasuri
- Ram Chandra Suri, Śvetāmbara, Samvat 1952–2047
- Anand Rishiji Maharaj
- Andayya - Kannada poet
- Haribhadra - 12th century philosopher
- Ranna - poet, one of the "three gems of Kannada literature".
- Sri Ponna - poet, one of the "three gems of Kannada literature". He was honoured by the title Kavichakravarthi for his prowess and domination of the Kannada literary circles at that time.
- Sthulabhadra
- Bhikshu, 1726–1803 CE. Creator of Terapanthi sect of Jainism.
- Haribhadra, c. 7th century CE. Śvetāmbara.
- Hiravijaya,(belonging to the Tapa Gaccha tradition of Śvetāmbara Jains) who influenced the Mughal Emperor Akbar to give up eating meat.
- Acharya Mahaprajna - Acharya of Terapanth sect
- Kalapurnasuri
- Daulatsagarsuri (1920–2024) - a Jain ascetic, philosopher, and a revered saint. He was the head of the monastic order (Gacchadhipati) of the "Sagar Samudaay" of the Tapa Gaccha. While he was alive, he was the preceptor of 900 monks and nuns. He was awarded the rarest of the rare and ancient title of "Shri Sangh Sthavir" based on his austerity, knowledge of the canonical scriptures of Jainism, and spiritual leadership, becoming the only second of the modern Jain ascetics to have achieved this feat.
- Rashtrasant Yugdivakar Pujya Param Gurudevshri Namramuni Maharajsaheb
- Acharya Rajendrasuri - Acharya of the 20th century
- Acharya Mahasharman - 11th Acharya of Jain Swetamber Terapanth Community.
- Acharya Vijay Vallabh suri
- Vimalsagarsuri - Acharya of the 21st century
