= Parikh =

Parikh is a name found among Hindus, Jains and Memon from India. It means assayer in the Gujarati language and has its roots in the Sanskrit word for examiner. Both the Oswal and Porwal communities of India, Canada and United States have clans called Parekh.

People bearing the name, who may or may not be affiliated with the above communities, include:

- Shrenu Parikh, Indian television actress
- Narhari Parikh, Indian freedom fighter and social reformer
- Rasiklal Chhotalal Parikh, Gujarati writer, poet, and Indologist
- Rohit Jivanlal Parikh, Indian-American mathematician and logician
- Himanshu Parikh, Indian architect
- Jayant Parikh, Indian painter, printmaker, and muralist
- Vasant Parikh, Indian politician and social worker
- Deepak Parikh, CEO of Clariant Chemicals India
- Tej Parikh, former Chief Economist, Institute of Directors
