= Keśiśramanācharya =

6th-century BC Śvetāmbara Jain monk

- Parshvanath's Ganadhara.
- Venerated in: Śvetāmbara Jainism
- Predecessor: Ārya Samudradatta
- Successor: Swayamprabhasuri
- Symbol: Tree or Jain Chihna
- Height: 1.8m

Genealogy
- Born: 511 BCE (historical); 534 BCE (traditional); Sarnath (ancient in Shaptārshis dynasty)

Keśiśramanācharya was the leader of the order of monks of the twenty third Tirthankara, Parshvanatha, who is said to have met the Ganadhara (chief disciple) of the twenty fourth Tirthankara, Mahavira, Indrabhuti Gautama. He was the disciple of Ārya Samudradatta. His monastic lineage later came to be known as the Upkeśa Gaccha of the Śvetāmbara tradition of Jainism.

== Monastic lineage ==
He is not mentioned in literature of the Digambara sect. The Śvetāmbaras claim him exclusively. The time period between Parshvanatha and Mahavira was only 250 years, which is relatively short when compared to the periods between any two consecutive tirthankaras. According to ancient Śvetāmbara texts such as Uttaradhyayana Sutra, owing to this short period of time between both the tirthankaras, monks of Parshvanatha's lineage existed during Mahavira's time period. Keśiśramanācharya was a monk of Parshvanatha's lineage, who is said to have met Gautama Swami, the prime disciple of Mahavira. Parshvanatha's monastic lineage is said to have begun with his prime disciple Arya Śubhadatta. Later, this lineage came to be known as the Upkeśa Gaccha of the Śvetāmbara tradition.

Keśiśramanācharya was the 4th head of the monastic order in Parshvanatha's monastic lineage. His disciple, Swayamprabhasuri, went on to create the Porwal and Srimali castes by preaching Jainism and strongly opposing animal sacrifice in Bhinmal and Padmavati region of present-day Rajasthan. Later, Swayamprabhasuri's disciple Ratnaprabhasuri preached Jainism in Osian and created the Oswal caste. The monastic lineage of Upkeśa Gaccha is particularly important as it narrates the history of Jainism before Mahavira and describes the creation of three of the most prominent castes of Jain followers. It also suggests the antiquity of the Śvetāmbara tradition and that white-clad ascetics were the original followers of Jainism and of Parshvanatha, who preceded naked ascetics of the Digambara sect.

== See also ==
- Mahavira
- Swayamprabhasuri
- Ratnaprabhasuri
