= Veerwal =

Veerwal (also spelled as Virwal) is a Jain community in the Mewar region in Rajasthan, India.

The Veerwals are followers of Sameer Muniji Maharaj who introduced them to Jainism in 1950. His death anniversary is celebrated by the All Indian Jain Veerwal Jain Sangh every year.

Sameer Pavan Dham in Ahimsa Nagar in Chittorgarh serves as a main center. Ahimsa Nagar, located about 4 miles from Chittorgarh, was inaugurated by Mohanlal Sukhadia in 1966. Even though Sameer Muniji belonged to the Sthanakvasi tradition, Sameer Pavan Dham hosts Jain dignitaries from other traditions also.

== See also ==
- Bhinmal
- Chittorgarh
- Oswal
