= Upkeśa Gaccha =

Monastic order of Śvetāmbara Jainism

Upkeśa Gaccha is the oldest gaccha (monastic order) of Śvetāmbara Jainism. It is one of the 84 gacchas of the Śvetāmbara sect that were once in existence. Unlike most other gacchas that follow Mahavira's lineage and begin with his disciple Sudharmaswami, it follows the lineage of the 23rd Tirthankara Parshvanatha and is said to have begun with his prime disciple Ganadhara Shubhadatta. It went extinct in about 1930 CE.

== History ==
According to Śvetāmbara scriptures, lineage-wise, Upkeśa Gaccha is the oldest of all the 84 gacchas to ever exist. It is said to be of Parshvanatha's lineage. Historically, Parshvanatha's śāsana-kāl (transl. time between Mahavira and Parshvanath, when Parshvanatha's teachings are followed and applied by Jains) was 250 years, which is the smallest difference between two Tirthankaras in this Avasarpiṇī. As a result, ascetics of Parshvanatha's unbroken lineage were around when Mahavira was born.

As per Kalpa Sūtra, an important canonical scripture of the Śvetāmbaras, Mahavira's parents were Śrāvakas (lay-followers) of Parshvanatha's ascetics. Deepvijay Kaviraaj's Mahavir Swami nu Halardu, a musical lullaby composed in the late 18th or early 19th century, describes Trishala singing it for Mahavira. It also describes Keśiśramanācharya, the then head of Parshvanatha's monastic order, informing Trishala that her child will be the 24th Tirthankara after she described the 14 auspicious dreams.

According to the 6th century BC Jain text Uttaradhyayana Sutra, Keśiśramanācharya was around during most of Mahavira's life-span and is said to have met Gautama Swami, Mahavira's prime disciple. The text says that he met Gautama Swami to clarify his doubts about the differences in the teachings of both the Tirthankaras. Parshvanatha's ascetics wore coloured clothes (usually dark brown). Upon receiving satisfactory responses from him, Keśiśramanācharya merged his monastic order with Mahavira's congregation and all his monks became Śvetāmbara (white-clad) monks. Even though they merged into Mahavira's congregation, Upkeśa Gaccha always maintained its unique identity of tracing its monastic lineage to Parshvanatha.

In 457 BC, 70 years after Mahavira attained nirvana, Ratnaprabhasuri, the then head of this monastic lineage won the debate against Brahmins who advocated animal sacrifice in the name of religion at Upkeśapattan. As a result of that, his lineage came to be known as the Upkeśa Gaccha.

History of the Upkeśa Gaccha enables a deeper understanding of the antiquity of the Śvetāmbara sect and the religious history of Western India and Central India.

== Monastic Lineage ==
Several names of monks in the monastic lineage are repeated every few generations. According to the English translation of Vijayanandsuri's Ajnāna-timira-bhāskara by indologist and professor A. F. Rudolph Hoernle, the monastic lineage of the heads of this gaccha is found to be as follows: -

1. Ganadhara Arya Shubhadatta: The prime and senior-most disciple of the 23rd Tirthankara Parshvanatha.
2. Arya Haridatta: The prime disciple of Ganadhara Shubhadatta.
3. Arya Samudradatta: The prime disciple of Arya Haridatta.
4. Keśiśramanācharya: The prime disciple of Arya Samudradatta and a contemporary of the 24th Tirthankara Mahavira and Mahavira's Ganadhara Gautama Swami. He is said to have met Gautama Swami and cleared his doubts about the differences in the teachings of Parshvanatha and Mahavira. Upon receiving satisfactory clarification from Gautama Swami, he and his monastic order merged into the Chaturvidha Sangha of Mahavira.
5. Acharya Swayamprabhasuri: The successor of Keśiśramanācharya. He condemned and abolished animal sacrifice in Bhinmal and Padmavati and founded the Śrīmali and Porvāl clans in 470 BC. He was a contemporary of Gautam Swami, but there are no accounts of them meeting each other.
6. Acharya Ratnaprabhasuri: The prime disciple of Swayamprabhasuri and the most prominent of the monks of this monastic lineage. His monastic lineage is known as Upkeśa Gaccha as a result of his efforts in abolishing animal sacrifice at Osian in 457 BC. He also founded the Oswal clan. Today, nearly four-fifths of Śvetāmbaras belong to this clan. As a result of that, he is the most celebrated monk of this lineage. His footprints are worshipped at the Vimal Vasahi at Dilwara Temples.
7. Acharya Yakshadevasuri: The prime disciple of Ratnaprabhasuri and the monk who is said to have converted the yakṣa (transl. protecting deity/demi-god) Māṇbhadra and relieved the pain of the Chaturvidha Sangha. He was consecrated as an acharya from the position of upadhyaya. His name before his installation as the head preceptor was Vīrdhawalopādhyāya.
8. Acharya Kakkasuri
9. Acharya Devaguptasuri
10. Acharya Siddhasuri
11. Acharya Ratnaprabhasuri
12. Acharya Yakshadevasuri
13. Acharya Kakkasuri: The prime disciple of the previous preceptor Yakshadevasuri (of the 12th generation). He is said to have alleviated the violent calamities caused by Chamunda due to the chiselling of the idol of Mahavira at the Osian temple by some young lay-followers. Legend has it that he was told by Sacciya Mata that the town of Upkeśapattan will be deserted as a result of the chiselling of the idol of Mahavira. He is said to have alleviated the problems that fell upon Oswals by a ritualistic bathing of the idol, 303 years after its consecration by Ratnaprabhasuri.
14. Acharya Devaguptasuri
15. Acharya Siddhasuri
16. Acharya Ratnaprabhasuri
17. Acharya Yakshadevasuri: He existed in the 585th year of Vira Nirvana Samvat. The Kalpa Sūtra mentions a 12-year long famine that occurred 585 years after Mahavira attained nirvana. During that famine, Vajraswami's disciple Vajrasena's four disciples — Nāgendra, Chandra, Vidyādhara, Nivṛtti were initiated by Yakshadevasuri after the death of their preceptor Vajrasena. These four disciples went on to establish four branches of the Upkeśa Gaccha — Nāgendra Gaccha, Chandra Gaccha, Vidyādhara Gaccha, and Nivṛtti Gaccha.
18. Acharya Kakkasuri
19. Acharya Devaguptasuri
20. Acharya Siddhasuri
21. Acharya Ratnaprabhasuri
22. Acharya Yakshadevasuri
23. Acharya Kakkasuri
24. Acharya Devaguptasuri
25. Acharya Siddhasuri
26. Acharya Ratnaprabhasuri
27. Acharya Yakshadevasuri
28. Acharya Kakkasuri
29. Acharya Devaguptasuri
30. Acharya Siddhasuri
31. Acharya Ratnaprabhasuri
32. Acharya Yakshadevasuri
33. Acharya Kakkasuri: He performed a penance called Ṣaṣṭhtap (transl. a penance involving taking one meal in every three days) for 12 years. A merchant named Sheth Somaka of Marotakota was released from fetters by reciting a hymn praising him. He is also credited with producing water for the devotees at Mount Abu and bringing clarified butter from Jaisalmer to Bharuch as a token of affection for his co-religionists and disciples.
34. Acharya Devaguptasuri
35. Acharya Siddhasuri
36. Acharya Kakkasuri
37. Acharya Devaguptasuri
38. Acharya Siddhasuri
39. Acharya Kakkasuri
40. Acharya Devaguptasuri: He is said to have been given the position of the head of this monastic order in 938 CE.
41. Acharya Siddhasuri: He is said to have been a viśaviśvopaka (transl. one who has the 36 qualities of an acharya).
42. Acharya Kakkasuri: He was the author of the Śvetāmbara non-canonical scripture Pancha-pramān (transl. the five proofs).
43. Acharya Devaguptasuri: He was given this position in 1015 CE. He was the author of the non-canonical work Nava-pada-prakaraṇa (transl. the context of the nine supreme virtues - Arihanta, Siddha, Acharya, Upadhyaya, Sadhu, Samyak Darshan, Samyak Gyan, Samyak Charitra, Samyak Tap).
44. Acharya Siddhasuri
45. Acharya Kakkasuri
46. Acharya Devaguptasuri
47. Acharya Siddhasuri
48. Acharya Kakkasuri
49. Acharya Devaguptasuri: Several legends are associated with him. One of them is the turning of water as a remedy to poison during after being used to wash his feet.
50. Acharya Siddhsuri
51. Acharya Kakkasuri: In 1097 CE, on being advised by Hemachandra and King Kumarapala, he expelled monks who were lax with their conduct (yatis) from Patan.
52. Acharya Devaguptasuri
53. Acharya Siddhasuri
54. Acharya Kakkasuri: He is said to have restored Marotakota.
55. Acharya Devaguptasuri
56. Acharya Siddhasuri
57. Acharya Kakkasuri
58. Acharya Devaguptasuri
59. Acharya Siddhasuri
60. Acharya Kakkasuri
61. Acharya Devaguptasuri
62. Acharya Siddhasuri
63. Acharya Kakkasuri
64. Acharya Devaguptasuri
65. Acharya Siddhasuri: He was consecrated as the head of the monastic order in 1272 CE. He is known as the preceptor who consecrated the idol of Rishabhanatha in the main temple at Palitana hills after the sixth reconstruction of Palitana temples, which was performed by Samara Shah.
66. Acharya Kakkasuri: He is said to have authored Machchha Prabandha which describes the lives, character, and conduct of the wealthy Jain Śrāvaka Samara Shah and his brother Sahaja Shah.
67. Acharya Devaguptasuri: He was installed as the head in 1352 CE at Delhi. The event was organized by Sārandhara, a Śrāvaka at the cost of 5000 gold coins.
68. Acharya Siddhasuri
69. Acharya Kakkasuri: In 1387 CE, he stopped animal sacrifice in the province of Kachha and converted the king to Jainism.
70. Acharya Devaguptasuri
71. Acharya Siddhasuri
72. Acharya Kakkasuri
73. Acharya Devaguptasuri
74. Acharya Siddhasuri

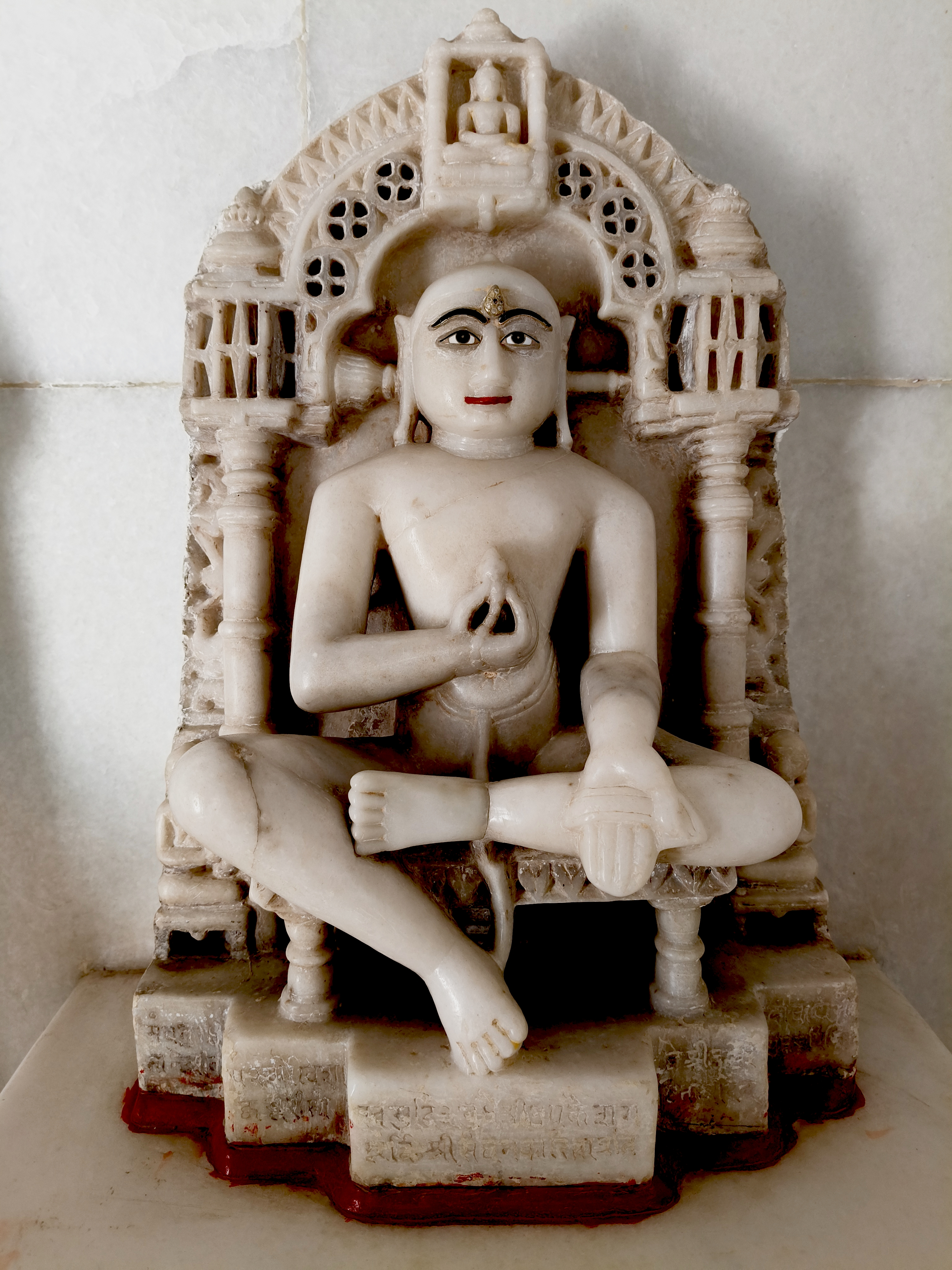
An idol of Kakkasūri of Upakeśa Gaccha at Pañcāsara Pārśvanātha (new) Temple. The idol was consecrated in 1452 Vikrama Saṃvat (=1395-96 C. E.))

== Contributions ==
- Upkeśa Gaccha forms the backbone of several gacchas of the Śvetāmbara sect including Nāgendra Gaccha, Chandra Gaccha, Vidyādhara Gaccha, and Nivṛtti Gaccha.
- Heads of this monastic order strongly condemned animal sacrifice and established the Oswal, Porwal, and Shrimali clans. Most Śvetāmbaras in Western India belong to one of these clans.
- Śrāvakas of the Oswal, Porwal, and Shrimali clans went on to establish several temples of devotional importance amongst Śvetāmbaras such as Dilwara Temples, Ranakpur Jain temple, Kesariyaji Tirth, Nakodaji Tirth, Jirawala Tirth, several Jain temples on the Pavagadh Hill, several Jain temples at Palitana etc.
- Preceptors of this gaccha are also credited with inspiring the sixth reconstruction of Palitana temples.
- Several works of literature such as Machchha Prabandha, Nava-pada-prakaraṇa, Pancha-pramān, Tattvamimansa, Tattvavichār etc. were written by monks of this gaccha.

== See also ==
- Mahavira
- Swayamprabhasuri
- Ratnaprabhasuri
