= Parik =

Parik or Pařík is a surname. Notable people with the surname include:

- Jüri Parik (1889–1929), Estonian lawyer and politician
- Karel Pařík (1857–1942), Czech architect

== See also ==
- Parikh, surname
