= Bhagal Bhim =

Village in Jalore district Rajasthan, India

- Village
- Location in Rajasthan, India Bhagal Bhim (India)
- Coordinates: 25°21′35″N 72°41′40″E
- Country: India
- State: Rajasthan
- District: Jalore
- Tehsil: Bhinmal

Population (2011)
  - Total: 3,708

Bhagal Bhim is a village in the Jalore district Rajasthan, India. According to the Census 2011 data, it is home to over 500 families with a total population 3,708.
