= Hindu sacrifice =

Hindu sacrifice may refer to:

- Yajna
- Puja (Hinduism)
- Animal sacrifice in Hinduism
