= Swayamprabhasuri =

6th-century BC Indian Śvetāmbara Jain ascetic

Ācārya Swayamprabhasuri Mahārāja Sāheb

Personal life
- Died: Palitana
- Known for: Condemnation of animal sacrifice and creation of Śrīmali and Porvāl castes
- Other names: Svayamprabhasuri, Somaprabhasuri
- Honours: Purvadhāri, Śrut Kevalī

Religious life
- Religion: Jainism
- Lineage: of Parshvanatha
- Sect: Śvetāmbara; Upkeśa Gaccha
- Initiation: by Keśiśramanācharya

Religious career
- Predecessor: Keśiśramanācharya
- Successor: Ratnaprabhasuri

Swayamprabhasuri or Svayamprabhasuri was a Śvetāmbara Jain ascetic and the 5th successor in the lineage of the monastic heads of the Chaturvidha Sangha's (transl. four-fold congregation) Upkeśa Gaccha. He succeeded Keśiśramanācharya and is believed to have existed in 6th–5th century BC. He is known for establishing the Śrīmali and Porvāl clans.

== Birth and initiation ==
Although not much is known about him, some non-canonical scriptures such as Ratnaprabhasuri's "Upkeśa Gaccha Caritra" (transl. Biography of the Upkeśa Gaccha) describe his ascetic life in detail and life before initiation into the Jain Sangha succinctly. As per scriptures of the Śvetāmbara sect, he is believed to have been born in the 6th century BC in a family belonging to the Vidyādhara clan.

He is believed to have been initiated by Keśiśramanācharya, the 4th pattadhār (transl. head of the monastic order) in the 23rd tirthankara Parshvanatha's lineage. Therefore, unlike most Jain ascetics today who trace their lineage to the 24th Tirthankara Mahavira, Swayamprabhasuri traces his ascetic ancestry to the 23rd Tirthankara Parshvanatha.

== Monastic lineage ==
According to Uttaradhyayana Sutra, an ancient canonical text of the Śvetāmbaras, it is believed that Keśiśramanācharya had a conversation with Mahavira's prime disciple Indrabhuti Gautama about the differences in the teachings of both the Tirthankaras. It is said that the disciples of Parshvanatha wore colored (usually dark-brown) clothes and those of Mahavira wore white clothes. It is such differences that Keśiśramanācharya came to discuss with Indrabhuti Gautama.

The text further states that upon receiving adequately satisfying answers from Indrabhuti Gautama, Keśiśramanācharya and all his disciples accepted the order of Mahavira and became white-clad mendicants. Later on, his lineage came to be known as the Upkeśa Gaccha. Even though it merged into Mahavira's Chaturvidha Sangha, this gaccha (transl. administrative sub-sect) always maintained its unique identity until its extinction in and around 1930 AD. Swayamprabhasuri was the successor of Keśiśramanācharya and the next head of the Upkeśa Gaccha.

== Ascetic life ==
He is said to have been well-versed with the Dvādaśāṅga (transl. 12 aṅgas) and the 14 purvas of the Jain canon. Today, the 14 purvas are considered to have been lost along with the rest of the text of the 12th aṅga Drstivada. He is, therefore, considered to have known the complete canon, making him one of the Śrut Kevalīs. Since he knew the 14 purvas, he is considered to have been a Purvadhāri as well. Since he was born in the Vidyādhara clan, he is also said to have known several of the magical rituals (or vidyās) that members of the Vidyādhara clan knew.

Scriptures describing his life mention that he headed the congregation of 'several thousands' of ascetics (which is said to have been only Parshvanatha's congregation and their work is separately acknowledged from Mahavira's followers) and helped eliminate violent practices of animal sacrifice in the name of religion, especially the rituals of Shaktism.

== Creation of the Śrīmali clan ==
Scriptural accounts of his life describe his visit to Rajasthan 57 years after Mahavira's nirvana which was in 527 BCE. This would date his visit to Śrīmal in 470 BCE. Most of the non-canonical texts of the Śvetāmbara sect agree upon this account and describe him as one of the first few Jain monks to visit Rajasthan. Following is a brief scriptural account of the establishment of the Śrīmali clan by Swayamprabhasuri.

In Maru Pradesh (modern-day Rajasthan), monks neither of Jainism, nor of Buddhism had preached due to the difficult terrain (desert). Brahmins had a monopoly in this part of India. It is said that practices of Kundapanth and Caliyapanth, branches of Tantric Hinduism, were very popular. It is believed that they promoted several tantric malpractices in the name of religion. It is further stated that Śrīmal (modern-day Bhinmal), a town in Rajasthan, was at the center of such practices.

Once, Swayamprabhasuri was wandering with his disciples near Mount Abu for the first time after visiting Palitana temples. Several merchants from Śrīmal visited Mount Abu for business. Some of them happened to come across Swayamprabhasuri's sermons on non-violence. They insisted upon him to visit Śrīmal to end such malpractices. Later, he visited Śrīmal where preparations for an Ashvamedha Yagya were being made. Several animals were readied for sacrifice. When his disciples went out to beg for food, they returned without any food stating that only meat being cooked at all households they went to and that they could not find food 'free from 42 faults' in the town.

Upon hearing this, Swayamprabhasuri immediately went to King Jayasen's palace where Brahmins were preparing for the animal sacrifice. The king welcomed him and asked about the reason for his visit. Swayamprabhasuri clearly stated the Jain principle of "Ahimsa parmo dharma" (transl. non-violence is the first act of righteousness). Interrupting his sermon, the Brahmin leader for the sacrificial ritual told the king that Jains do not follow the Vedas and must not be heeded to. However, Swayamprabhasuri stayed determined on his point and a lengthy debate followed. Swayamprabhasuri emerged victorious in the debate and King Jayasen, along with 90000 households of the town turned towards non-violence and eventually, Jainism after Swayamprabhasuri preached them about the 12 vows for householders.

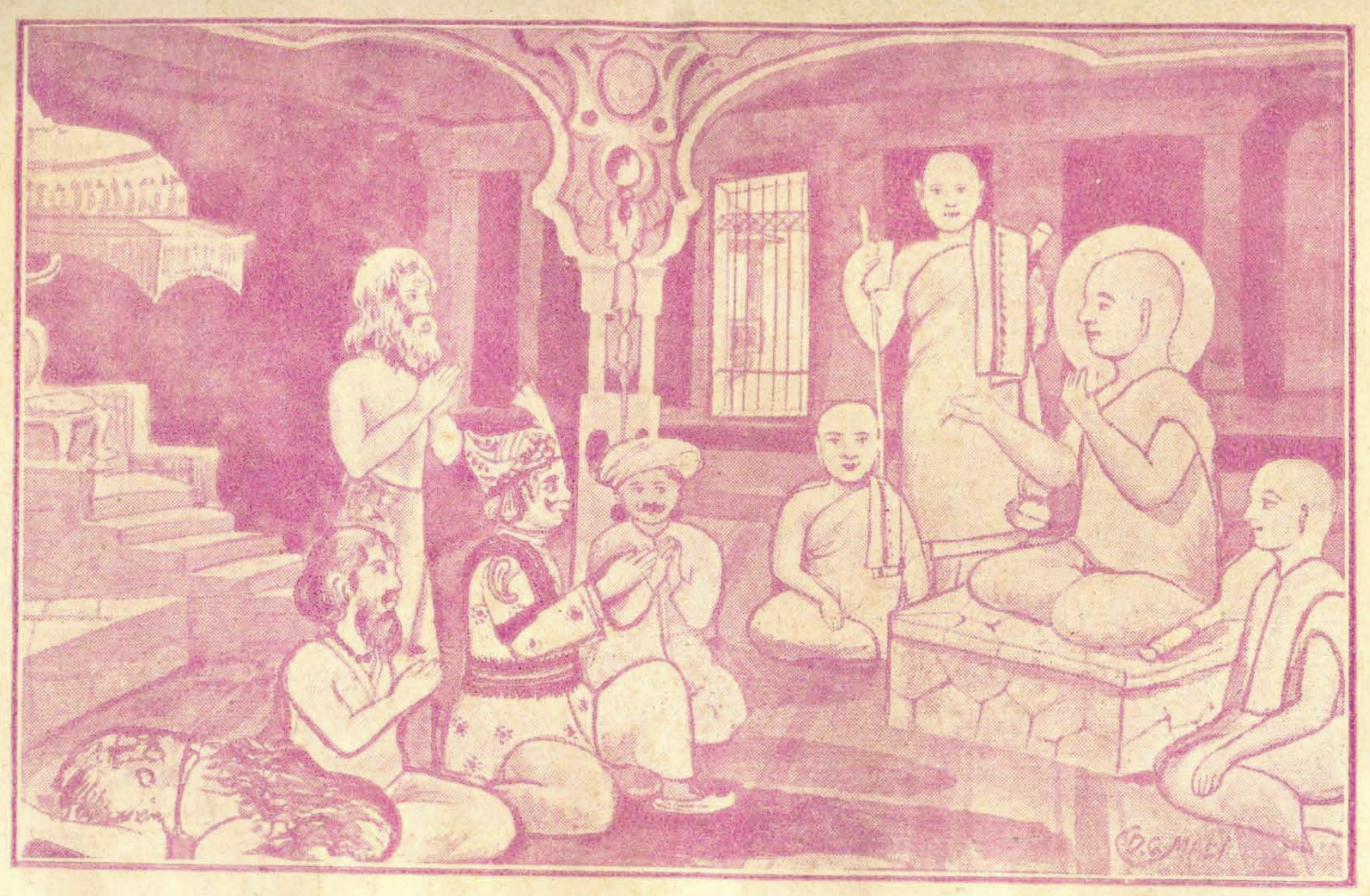
Swayamprabhasuri delivering a sermon in the court of King Jayasena of Srimal

Later on, residents of this large town moved to various parts of Rajasthan and their clan was named Śrīmali after their hometown Śrīmal.

It is believed that Swayamprabhasuri consecrated a temple and an idol of the 1st Tirthankara Rishabhanatha at Śrīmal. A pilgrimage procession to Palitana temples was also organized by the Jain Sangha at Śrīmal. It is further stated that they also renovated Jain temples at Mount Abu.

== Creation of the Prāgvat (Porvāl) clan ==
After his sermons at Śrīmal, householder and King Jayasen requested him to visit the region of Padmavati near Aravalli Range since similar practices of animal sacrifice were being performed there. He agreed to it and owing to his labdhi and vidyā, reached Padmavati within a period of 48 minutes the morning of when the Ashvamedha Yagya was scheduled to be performed. He entered the king's court.

Since this was a while after Swayamprabhsuri's sermons in Śrīmal, Brahmins stated that they knew of his sermons at Śrīmal and that they would not accept his ideology. Swayamprabhasuri emphasized the importance of a bhāv yagya (Homa performed mentally and not physically). He further explained with the analogy that with karma as the wood and non-violence as the sacrifice, one purifies their soul and becomes eligible for moksha. He further explained the meaning of the Ratnatraya.

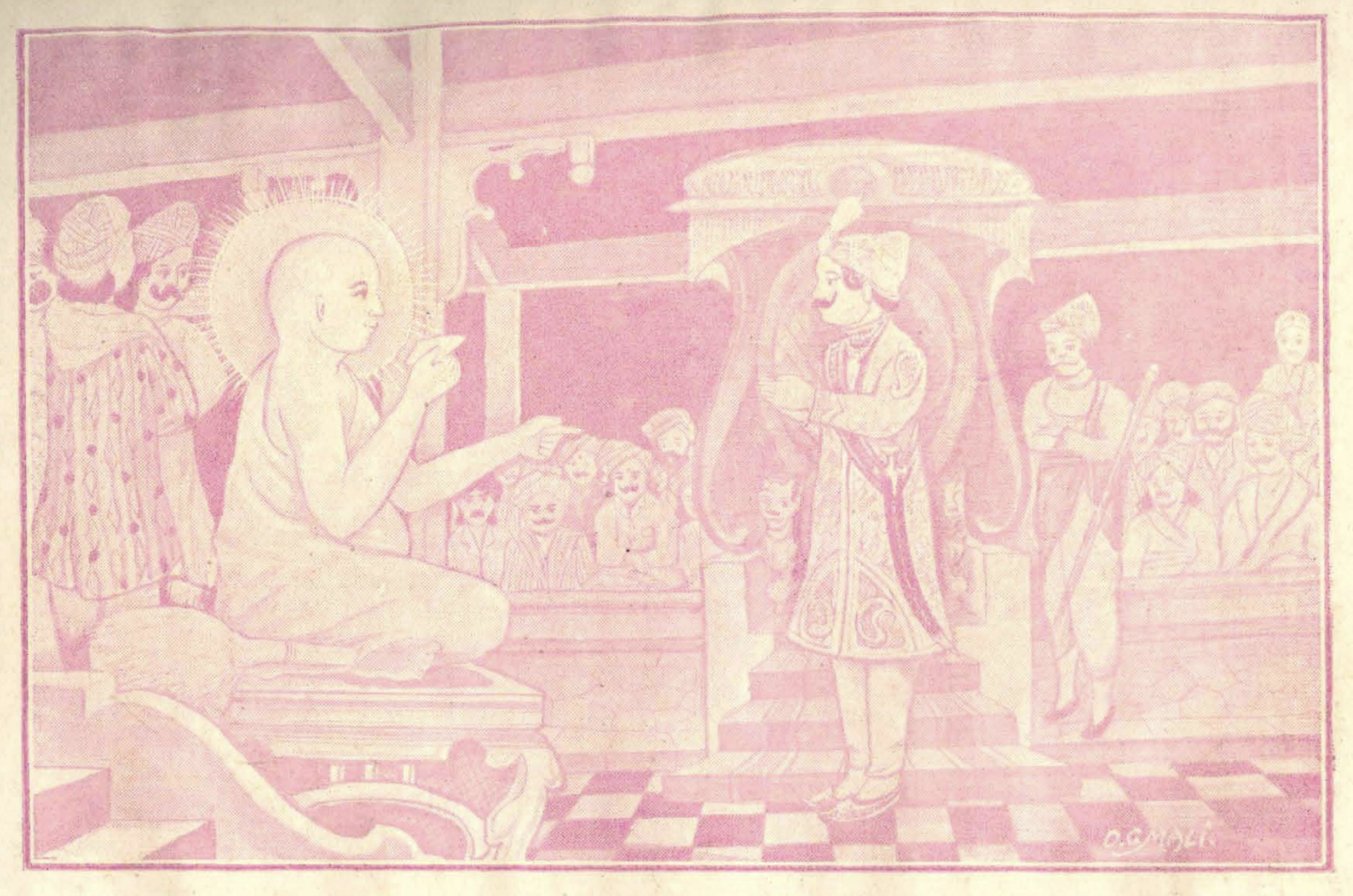
Swayamprabhasuri delivering a sermon in the court of King Padmasena of Padmavati

Brahmins lost the ensuing debate, and the residents of 45000 households of the kingdom and King Padmasena accepted Jainism. However, as a to respect the Brahmins, the name of the newly established caste was decided to be Prāgvat as the Brahmins who lost were Prāgvata Brahmins. Later on, the clan came to be known as Porvāl.

It is further stated that he consecrated a temple and an idol of the 16th Tirthankara Shantinatha at Padmavati among several temples and icons he consecrated at various villages and towns surrounding Padmavati.

== Initiation of Ratnachuda Vidyādhara ==
According to legends, Swayamprabhasuri was once preaching lay-followers, and Ratnachuda, a king of the Vidyādhara clan was flying above him. The latter halted to hear the sermon. The soft-hearted king was moved by the sermon and he expressed his will to become Swayamprabhasuri's disciple. He renounced his kingdom and consecrated his son, Kanakchuda, as the king and along with 500 other Vidyādharas, accepted initiation into the Jain sangha.

According to non-canonical scripture "Upkeśa Gaccha Caritra" (transl. Biography of the Upkeśa Gaccha) of the Śvetāmbara sect, 52 years after Mahavira's nirvana, in 465 BC, Swayamprabhasuri consecrated Ratnachudamuni as the next acharya (transl. head of the monastic order) of Upkeśa Gaccha and named him Ācārya Ratnaprabhasuri who went on to create the Oswal clan.

== Death and legacy ==
At a later time, he went to Palitana, and performed Sallekhana by fasting for one month and passed away.

Mahavira, Gautama Swami, Sudharmaswami, Jambuswami attained moksha during his time as the head of the monastic order of Upkeśa Gaccha. He is also credited with the establishment of the mercantile and warrior clans of Prāgvata (Poravāla) and Śrīmali, the members of which are some of the wealthiest merchants of India today. Wealthy merchants of the Poravāla community constructed some of the most important pilgrimage sites of Śvetāmbara Jains such as Ranakpur Jain temple, and Dilwara Temples.

== See also ==
- Uttaradhyayana
- Tapa Gaccha
- Hiravijaya
