= Kshemkari Mata Temple =

- Location in Rajasthan Kshemkari Mata Temple (India)

Religion
- Affiliation: Hinduism
- District: Jalore
- Deity: Kshemkari Devi

Location
- Location: Bhinmal
- State: Rajasthan
- Country: India
- Coordinates: 24.998°N 72.239°E

Architecture
- Creator: unknown
- Completed: unknown

Kshemkari Mata temple is a temple of the Hindu goddess Kshemkari, also known as Khimaj Mata on a mountain at latitude 24.998°N and longitude 72.239°E, in Bhinmal, Jalore District, Rajasthan, India.
