= Slum networking =

Slum networking is a holistic approach to improving urban infrastructure, developed by Himanshu Parikh

It addresses a range of facilities needed by slum dwellers:

- roads and footpaths
- storm drainage
- sanitation and sewerage
- water supply
- earthworks and soft landscaping
- street lighting
- solid waste management

This is achieved minimal donor funding by maximizing community participation and using microcredit systems.

== Technical aspects ==
World Bank funded public toilet block in Indore City, surrounded by a cesspit

Drainage and sewerage are made lower cost by making them follow the topography. Thus sewers do not need to be buried deeply, digging is reduced, and pumping of sewage is avoided as the sewers follow the natural drainage paths.

In a lecture for Engineers Without Borders (UK), Himanshu Parikh explained that his research into the growth of slums had led to the realisation that slums always develop along natural drainage paths. Therefore, the cheapest way to provide sewerage to a city is to build major sewers through the slums and connect the higher (and usually richer) areas of the city to them. This then provides sewerage to the whole city for lower costs than just providing sewerage to the rich areas.

This approach opens up funding from local and national governments, which can then be matched by donor funding if necessary to construct sewerage and water supply systems. The cost savings provide leverage to get the local government to provide tenure to slum dwellers. The slum dwellers, once given tenure, are willing to spend their own money on developing the slums as the risk of losing their investment is removed. Microcredit schemes mobilise this funding and allow slum housing to be connected to sewers and water systems and for slums to be landscaped and lit.

The evidence from Indore City is that two years after the upgrade programme the slums are no longer recognisable as slums.

== Awards ==
The scheme has won several awards, including the Dubai Award, the 1994 World Habitat Award and the Aga Khan Award for Architecture.
