= Heubach Colorants India =

Indian chemical company

Heubach Colorants India Limited
- Formerly: Colour-Chem Ltd (1956–2006); Clariant Chemicals India Ltd (2006–2022)
- Company type: Public
- Traded as: BSE: 506390; NSE: HEUBACHIND
- Industry: Speciality chemicals
- Founded: 1956
- Headquarters: Navi Mumbai, India
- Products: Pigments, Textile Chemicals & Leather Chemicals
- Parent: Heubach Group

Heubach Colorants India Ltd, formerly known as Clariant Chemicals India Ltd, is an Indian specialty chemicals manufacturing company, headquartered in Navi Mumbai. It is engaged in the manufacture of specialty chemicals for domestic and industrial use. It manufactures and markets pigments, pigment preparations and dyes for textiles, leather, paints, plastic, printing, personal care and agrochemicals sectors in India and international markets.

== History ==
In 1956, the company was incorporated as Colour-Chem Ltd with technical and financial collaboration from Hoechst and Bayer. It was founded by three Indian business groups: the Ruias, the Khataus, and Ghias.

In 1997, Hoechst's specialty chemicals division merged with Clariant, as a result of which Hoechst's 50.1% controlling stake in Colour-Chem Ltd was transferred to Clariant. Clariant increased its stake in the company to 70.1% following an open offer in 2003. In 2005, Clariant announced the merger of four group companies into Colour-Chem Ltd, and Colour-Chem Ltd was renamed as Clariant Chemicals India Ltd in 2006.

In 2022, Clariant Chemicals India Ltd was renamed to Heubach Colorants India Ltd, after Clariant sold its pigments business to Heubach Group and SK Capital Partners.

In October 2024, Sudarshan Chemical Industries announced the acquisition of Heubach Group for €127.5 million in an asset and share transaction, months after the latter filed for insolvency. The acquisition was completed in March 2025.
