= Himanshu Parikh =

Indian architect

- Born: 14 April 1951 (age 74); Dar-es-Salaam
- Occupation: Architect

Himanshu Parikh (born 14 April 1951) is a leading Indian engineer.

== Early life ==
Himanshu Parikh was born in Dar es Salaam, Tanzania. He graduated from Cambridge University, where he obtained both his bachelor's and master's degrees in engineering sciences with honours. He practised in Cambridge for ten years before moving to India in 1982. In India, he has done innovative work in structural engineering as well as in urban planning, environmental upgradation, and infrastructure design, with an emphasis on low-income urban and rural areas. His focus is to use water and environmental sanitation infrastructure as a principal catalyst for poverty alleviation. In structures, Mr. Parikh has developed the concept of ‘mindful buildings’ based on simplicity, frugality, and multiplicity. Currently, he spends most of his time in India on developmental work, teaching intermittently.

== Career ==
He established Himanshu Parikh Consulting Engineers in Ahmedabad, India, in 1982.

His practice focuses on urban planning, infrastructure design, and environmental upgrading. He developed a new concept for slum development called "Slum Networking."

On the structural engineering front, his work offers an alternative paradigm to "green buildings" in order to deliver affordable and low embodied energy structures within the holistic framework of light, ventilation, and thermal comfort.

=== Teaching career ===
Parikh was a professor at the School of Planning, CEPT University, Ahmedabad, a visiting lecturer at the Human Settlements Management Institute in Delhi, and has taught occasionally at Martin's School of Architecture at Cambridge University. He has also presented his concepts, both in infrastructure and structures, at several international fora.

== Awards ==
- Fazlur Khan International Travelling Fellowship for excellence in structural engineering in 1985
- The United Nations World Habitat Award for Urban Development in 1993
- Aga Khan Award for Architecture for his slum-networking project at Indore
- The Habitat II Best Practice recognition for Slum Networking in 1996
