= Oswal =

The Oswal (sometimes spelled Oshwal or Osval) are a Jain merchant community with origins in Osian, a town in the Marwar region of Rajasthan, India. According to research by Colonel James Tod, Osavālas are purely of Rajput origins and they belong to not one, but several different Rajput tribes. The Osavālas origin legend has multiple aspects, all of which include a fierce, meat-eating goddess who becomes pacified by a Jain ascetic, involving the conversion of a king to Jainism. In modern times, there are barely any Osavālas living in Osiyān, but they still regard the Mahavira temple and Sachiya Mata Temple as their "mother temples". They reside in Rajasthan, Malwa, Gujarat, and Kutch.

They were formerly also found in the Tharparkar district of Sindh (pre-partition), in present-day Pakistan. The Oswal community is traditionally associated with both the Śvetāmbara and Digambara sects of Jainism. While the majority of Oswals follow Śvetāmbara practices, certain subgroups, such as the Bardias, were influenced by the Digambara monk "Acharya Nemichandra Suri" and have maintained the Digambara tradition over generations.. This demonstrates the historical diversity of religious practices within the Oswal community.

== Creation of the Oswāl clan ==
=== Ratnaprabhasuri's penance near Upkeśapattan ===
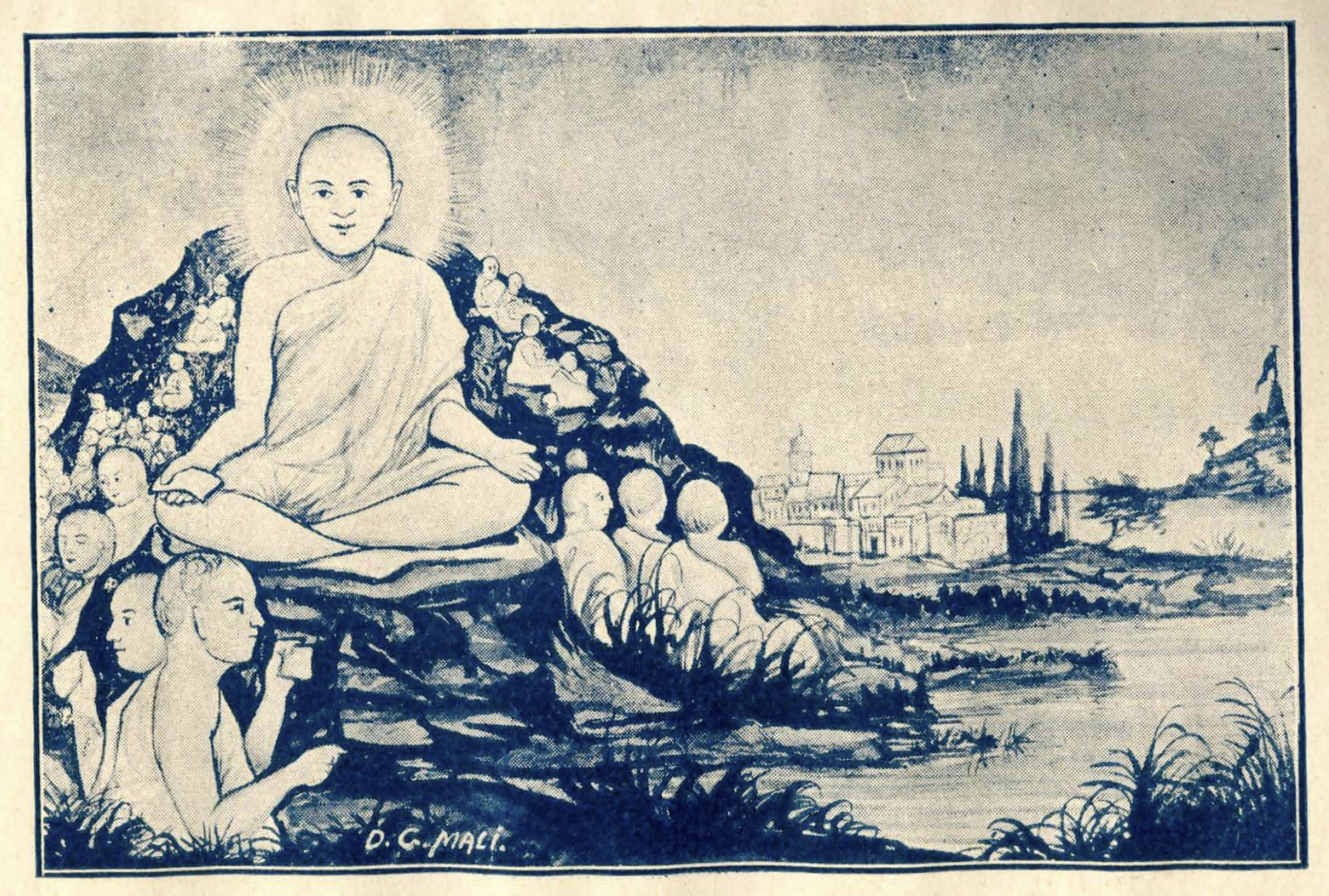
Ratnaprabhasuri and his 500 disciples doing a month-long fast and penance at Lunaadri hill near Osian

According to a legend, in 457 BC, Ratnaprabhasuri was at Mount Abu, and demi-goddess Chakreshvari appeared before him and urged him to spread the word of Jainism and save animals from religious violence in Maru Pradesh. She said that Swayamprabhasuri could not go beyond Śrīmal and Padmavati. He agreed to her and started moving towards Rajasthan with his 500 disciples. Upon reaching, he and his disciples started a month-long penance on a small hill just outside the town. When it was time to break the fast, his disciples entered the town to beg for alms. They could not find food 'free from 42 faults' as all residents of the town worshipped Chamunda, performed animal sacrifice, and consumed food unfit for Jain monks. In such situation, it was getting difficult for monks to survive and Ratnaprabhasuri ordered all his disciples to begin moving to another city.

=== Ratnaprabhasuri's chaturmasya at Upkeśapattan ===
Legends say that demi-goddesses Chamunda and Chakreshvari are friendly to one another. Due to this relationship between them and knowing that the monks sent by Chakreshvari were going away, Chamunda met Ratnaprabhasuri and urged him to stay for chaturmasya. He ordered monks who would not be able to perform severe penance to start walking towards another town. 465 monks left and 35 monks stayed with him.

Uppaldeva's daughter Saubhāgyadevi was married to his minister Uhada's son. He was bitten by a snake and all forms of treatment did not help revive him. When he was being taken for cremation, Chamunda took the form of a white-clad Jain monk and told the people that he was still alive and then disappeared. When Uppaldeva heard this, he and the others took his son-in-law to Ratnaprabhasuri. The water collected after washing Ratnaprabhasuri's feet was splashed on the prince's face and he was instantly revived. The king felt indebted to Ratnaprabhasuri and gifted him valuables. However, the latter denied stating that he had given up his kingdom at Mount Vaitādhya to become a monk. He said that he would not accept any such materialistic repayment. The people requested him to deliver a sermon.

=== Ratnaprabhasuri's sermon ===
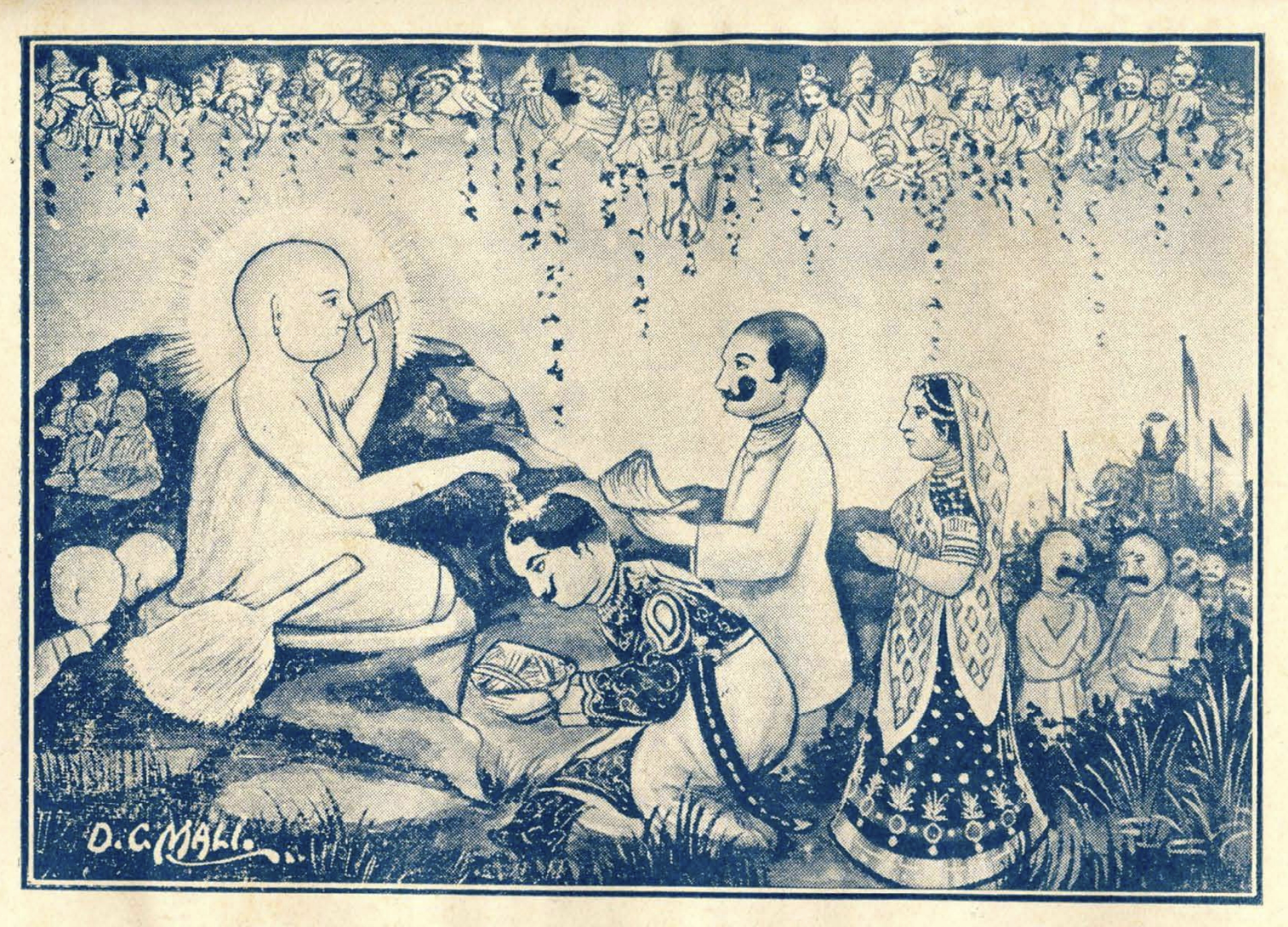
Ratnaprabhasuri converts Utpaldeva and residents of Osian into Jains

He delivered an impactful sermon on the various bodies a soul wanders in and how rare a birth a human is. He emphasized that in such a rare state, one should perform acts of righteousness and embrace non-violence. He then preached about the twelve vows of householders and five vows of Jain monks that lead to Ratnatraya and eventual moksha. He condemned the consumption of alcohol and meat sternly and on giving up animal sacrifice. He also insisted upon embracing non-violence. Further, he preached about establishing Jain temples, installing icons of Tirthankaras, and worshipping them regularly. Everyone regretted their acts of violence the moment his sermon ended. All residents of the town, along with King Uppaldeva accepted Jainism wholeheartedly.

=== Ratnaprabhasuri's debate with Brahmins ===
Shaiva Brahmins were infuriated looking at the influence of Ratnaprabhasuri on the residents of the town. They demanded a Śāstrārtha (transl. debate on religious ideologies and scriptures). Ratnaprabhasuri and his 35 disciples agreed to it. The Brahmins began by stating the lack of devotion in Jains and questioning Jainism's antiquity. Ratnaprabhasuri's disciple Vīrdhawalopādhyāya countered this claim by stating accounts of Jainism in the Brahmin scriptures. Ratnaprabhasuri concluded the debate stating that they have no benefit in people accepting or rejecting Jainism and that it is their moral duty to spread the word of Jainism. Brahmins eventually lost the debate and the entire town converted to Jainism. Several Jain temples were established several icons were consecrated. Ratnaprabhasuri also wrote several non-canonical scriptures such as Tattvamimansa, Tattvavichār etc.

=== Establishment of Osian's 'Mahavira Temple' ===
Uppaladeva's minister Uhada was already establishing a temple dedicated to Vishnu. However, the construction was being hindered. Ratnaprabhasuri suggested him to construct it with Mahavira as the principal deity. The temple was ready. The residents of the town asked Ratnaprabhasuri about an icon to consecrate. He knew that Chamunda was preparing one using sand and the milk of a cow, so he asked the residents to keep patience. According to scriptural and local legends, one day, the cowherd saw his cow discharging milk at a part in the village. He informed Minister Uhada and the latter dug the land there. He found an idol of the 24th Tirthankara Mahavira. They urged Ratnaprabhasuri to consecrate this idol in the temple. However, the preceptor knew that the idol was unfinished and needed 7 more days to be completely sculpted by the demi-goddess. However, looking at the excitement and devotion among the people, he allowed digging and taking the idol out. Chamunda was angered by this and forced every householder to sacrifice one goat and every household to sacrifice one buffalo every day during the 9 days of the Navaratri.

=== Conversion of Chāmundā into 'Sacchiya Mātā' ===
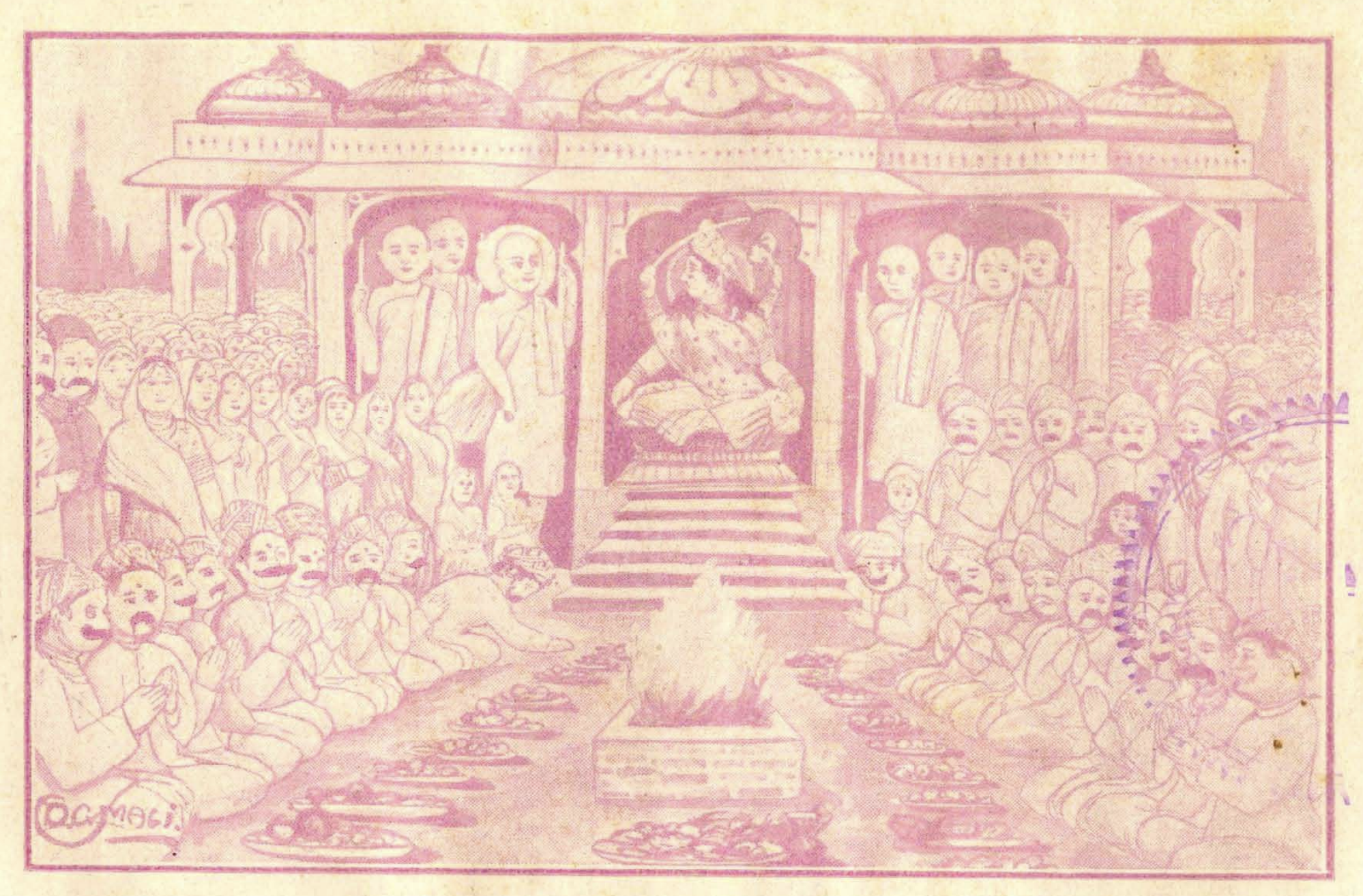
Ratnaprabhasuri converts Chamunda into Sacciya Mata

After a lengthy sermon by Ratnaprabhasuri, Chāmundā realized that violence was not the correct way and attained the Ratnatraya. She became a samyaktvi (one of right faith, knowledge, and conduct) demi-goddess. She was renamed to Sacchiya Mātā by Ratnaprabhasuri and was consecrated as the adhiśthāyikā (transl. protecting deity) of the Mahavira Jain temple, Osian. A shrine dedicated to her was also constructed on the small hill where Ratnaprabhasuri had performed penance. Later, the idol of Mahavira was consecrated.

=== Establishment of the 'Oswāl clan' ===
The residents of the town insisted upon Ratnaprabhasuri to name their clan different from Śrīmalis and Porvāls. Ratnaprabhasuri named the clan Oswāl. They were strict adherents of the Śvetāmbara sect. A poetic version of the legend was also written by a later monk belonging to the Upkeśa Gaccha.

== Notable people ==
- Jhaveri family
  - Shantidas Jhaveri (1584–1659), jeweller, bullion trader, and moneylender
  - Khushalchand Jhaveri (1680–1748), jeweller and financier
  - Lalbhai Dalpatbhai (1863-1912), industrialist
- Jagat Seth family, merchant, banking, and moneylender family in Bengal
- Premchand Raichand, stockbroker, businessman, and founder of the Bombay Stock Exchange.
- Bhamashah a financier, general and minister in the court of the great Rana Pratap of Mewar.
- Bharmal Shah, qiledar of Ranthambore fort appointed by Rana Sanga and was later prime minister under Maharana Udai Singh.

== Sources ==
- Sangave, Vilas Adinath (1980), Jaina Community: A Social Survey (2nd ed.), Bombay: Popular Prakashan, ISBN 978-0-317-12346-3
