= Porwal =

Regions with significant populations
- Southern Rajasthan, India

Religion
- Jainism, Hinduism

Related ethnic groups
- Sorathia, Kapol, Jangad Porwal, Oswal, Navnat, Meshri (Pushtimarga followers)

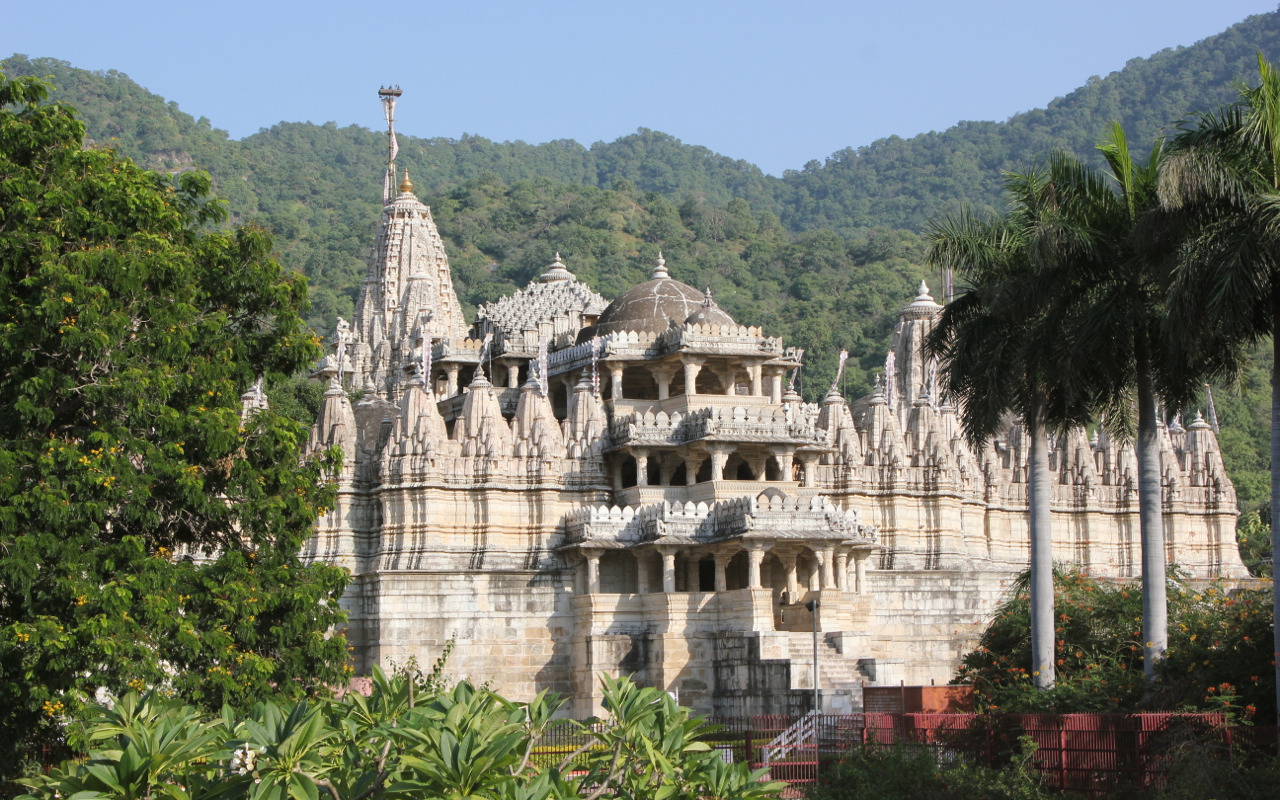
Ranakpur Jain Temple, built by Dharna Shah, a Porwal Jain Businessman from Ghanerao.

Poravāla, correctly called Poravāḍa, is a Kshatriya community that originated in southern Rajasthan, India. They are mainly of Jain or Hindu faith. The name Poravāla was applied on the basis of the names of other Bania communities (Osavāla, Agaravāla, Khaṇḍelavāla, etc.).

The name Poravāḍa is derived from Prāgavaṭa. The caste is divided into 24 gotras. They are also divided into three sections (from highest to lowest status): Visā, Dasā and Pañcā Poravāḍas. According to tradition the Visā and Dasā divisions arose in the 13th century. The brothers Vastupāla and Tejapāla were the sons of Poravāḍa father and Śrīmāli mother. The Poravādas who chose to eat with the brothers became Dasā, and those who refused became Visā. The Visā and Dasā interdine but do not intermarry. The Visās tend to be Jain while Dasā's tend to be Vaishnav. Formerly interreligious marriages occurred between Jains and Vaishnavs of the same sub-caste.

They originated from a region east of ancient Shrimal. In antiquity, they appear to be numerous and among the wealthiest communities in the region.

Many Jain temples were built by the Porwals, including:

- Ranakpur Jain temple of Dharna Shah, completed in 1441 CE
- Luna Vasahi (1231 CE) of Vastupal and Tejpal at Mount Abu
- The Adinath temple at Shatrunjaya by Javad Shah in 961 AD, which was subsequently renovated several times.

The Porwal community became divided into several regional communities including the Pure Poravāḍas, Soraṭhiya Poravāḍas, and Kapola Poravāḍas.

Poravāḍa Jains are mostly Śvetāmbara with some Digaṁbaras. The historian H. L. Jain has suggested that Krisha, the patron of Muni Srichandra, a Digambara monk, belonged to the same Ninanvaya clan as Vimala who built the Vimala Vasahi temple at Abu.

In the 16th century, Pushti Marga was founded by Vallabha, a Brahmin scholar from Telangana, who proposed that in the modern age, it is too hard to follow the Jnana and Karma Margs. He proposed Pushti Marga (Raag, Bhog and Shringar used in the seva of Shri Krishna) as an alternative. A section of the Porwals converted to Pushtimarga. Those who have converted to the Pushtimarg are known as Meshri (derived from Maheshwari) or Vania.

== Creation of the Prāgvat (Porvāl) Clan ==
After his sermons at Śrīmal and creation of the Śrīmali clan, householders and King Jayasen requested Śvetāmbara Jain monk Acharya Swayamprabhasuri to visit the region of Padmavati near Aravalli Range since similar practices of animal sacrifice were being performed there. He agreed to it and owing to his labdhi and vidyā, reached Padmavati within a period of 48 minutes the morning of when the Ashvamedha Yagya was scheduled to be performed. He entered the king's court.

Since this was a while after Swayamprabhsuri's sermons in Śrīmal, Brahmins stated that they knew of his sermons at Śrīmal and that they would not accept his ideology. Swayamprabhasuri emphasized the importance of a bhāv yagya (Homa performed mentally and not physically) to prevent animal sacrifice. He further explained with the analogy that with karma as the wood and non-violence as the sacrifice, one purifies their soul and becomes eligible for moksha. He further explained the meaning of the Ratnatraya.

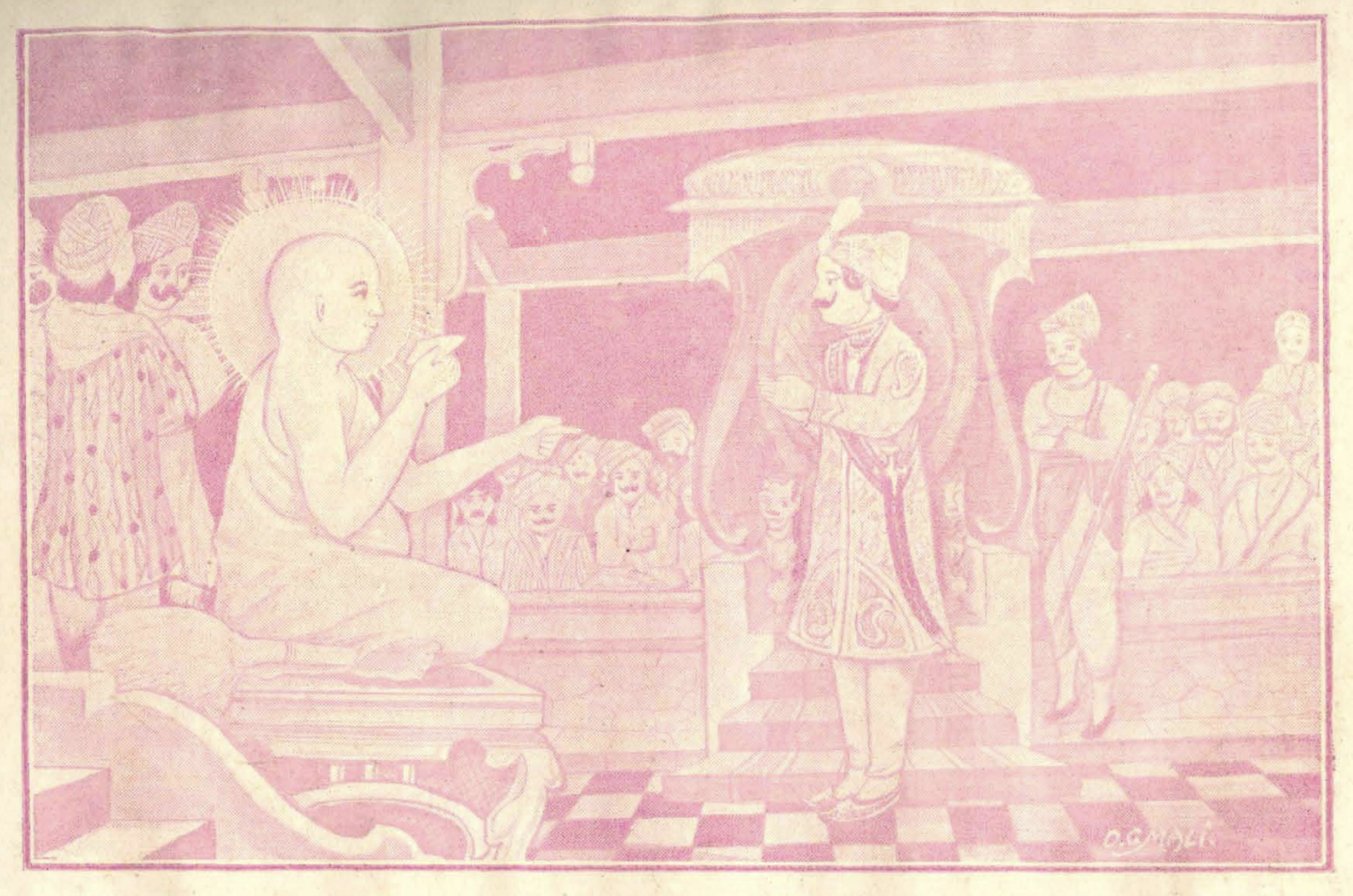
Swayamprabhasuri delivering a sermon in the court of King Padmasena of Padmavati

Brahmins lost the ensuing debate, and the residents of 45000 households of the kingdom and King Padmasena accepted Jainism. However, as a token of respect to the Brahmins, the name of the newly established caste was decided to be Prāgvat as the Brahmins who lost were Prāgvata Brahmins. Later on, the clan came to be known as Porvāl.

It is further stated that he consecrated a temple and an idol of the 16th Tirthankara Shantinatha at Padmavati among several temples and icons he consecrated at various villages and towns surrounding Padmavati.

== See also ==
- Jainism in Rajasthan
