= Bhinmal =

City in Jalore (Rajasthan), India

Bhinmal Mini Mumbai
- City
- Bhinmal District
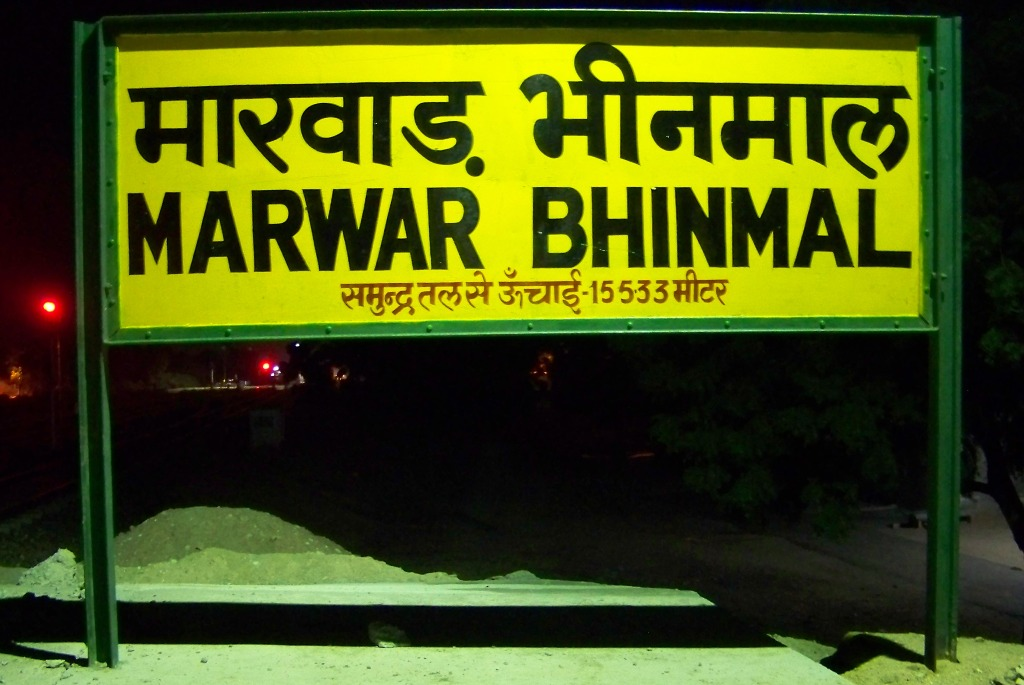
- Marwar Bhinmal Railway Station

- Location within India Location within Rajasthan
- Coordinates: 25.0°N 72.25°E
- Country: India
- State: Rajasthan
- District: Jalore

Government
  - Type: Municipal
  - Body: NagarPalika
  - Mayor/Chairman: Vimla Suresh Bohra
  - MP (Member of Parliament): Lumbaram Choudhary
  - MLA (Member of Legislative Assembly): Samarjit Singh
- Elevation: 155.33 m (509.6 ft)

Population (2011)
  - Total: 302,553

Languages
  - Official: Hindi
- Time zone: UTC+5:30 (IST)
- PIN: 343029
- Telephone code: 02969
- Vehicle registration: RJ-46 (New)

Bhinmal (previously Shrimal Nagar) is an ancient town in the Jalore District of Rajasthan, India. It is 72 kilometres (45 mi) south of Jalore. Bhinmal was the early capital of Gurjara-Pratihara dynasty, comprising modern-day southern Rajasthan and northern Gujarat. The town was the birthplace of the Sanskrit poet Magha and mathematician-astronomer Brahmagupta.

== History ==
Its older name was Srimal, from which Shrimali Brahmins took their name. Xuanzang, the Chinese Buddhist pilgrim who visited India between 631 and 645 AD during Harsha's reign, mentioned this place as Pi-lo-mo-lo. There are different views about the origin of its name. It is suggested that it may from its Bhil population, whereas Shrimalamahatmaya said the name arose because of the poverty caused by Islamic invaders, which caused most of its people to migrate from the area. It was the early capital of the kingdom of Gurjara-Pratihara dynasty. The dynasty is first mentioned in Banabhatta's Harshacharita in the seventh century AD. Its king is said to have been defeated by Harsha's father Prabhakaravardhana, who died c. 605 AD. The surrounding kingdoms were Sindha (Sindh), Lāta (southern Gujarat) and Malava (western Malwa), indicating that the region included northern Gujarat and southern Rajasthan.

Xuanzang mentioned the Gurjara country (Kiu-che-lo) with its capital at Bhillamala (Pi-lo-mo-lo) as the second largest kingdom of Western India. He distinguished it from the neighbouring kingdoms of Bharukaccha, Ujjayini, Malava, Valabhi and Surashtra. The Gurjara dynasty was said to have measured 833 miles in circuit and its ruler was a 20-year old Kshatriya, distinguished for his wisdom and courage. It is believed that the king must have been the immediate successor of the Chavda dynasty ruler Vyāgrahamukha, under whose reign the mathematician-astronomer Brahmagupta wrote his treatise in 628 AD.

The chroniclers of Sindh (an Arab province from 712 AD onward) narrated the campaigns of Arab governors on Jurz, the Arabic term for Gurjara. They mentioned it jointly with Mermad (Marumāda, in Western Rajasthan) and Al Baylaman (Bhinmal). The country was first conquered by Mohammad bin Qasim (712-715) and, for a second time, by Junayd (723-726). Upon bin Qasim's victory, Al-Baladhuri mentioned that the Indian rulers, including that of Bhinmal, accepted Islam and paid tribute . They presumably recanted after bin Qasim's departure, which made Junayd's attack necessary. After Junayd's reconquest, the kingdom at Bhinmal appeared to have been annexed by the Arabs.

A new dynasty was founded by Nagabhata I at Jalore, near Bhinmal, in about 730 AD, soon after Junayd's death in a battle against the pratihara king of . Nagabhata is said to have defeated the "invincible Gurjaras", presumably those of Bhinmal. Many other account credits him for having defeated a "Muslim ruler". Nagabhata is also known to have repelled the Arabs during a later major attack.

The Gwalior Inscription of Mihira Bhoja praises Nagabhata for destroying mlecchas (Arabs):

"स्तस्यानुजोसौ मघवमदमुषो मेघनादस्य संख्ये सौमित्त्रिस्तीव्रदण्डः प्रतिहरणविधेयः प्रतीहार आमोत् तहन्शे प्रतिहारकेतनभृति त्रैलोक्यरक्षास्पदे देवो नागभट : पुरातनमुनर्मूतिर्बभूवाद्भुतं । येनासौ सुक्कतप्रमाथिबलनम्लेच्छा।।

In that family, which extended shelter to the triple world and bore the emblem of Pratihāra, the king Nāgabhața appeared as an incarnation' of the Old Sage in a strange way.Wherefore he seemed to break up the complete army of the kings of Mlecchas the destroyers of virtue, with four arms lustrous because of the glittering and terrible weapons.

His dynasty expanded to Ujjain, and Nagabhata's successor Vatsaraja lost Ujjain to the Rashtrakuta prince Dhruva, who claimed to have driven him into "trackless desert". An inscription in Daulatpura from 843 AD mentions Vatsaraja having made grants near Didwana. Later, the Pratiharas became the dominant force of the Rajasthan and Gujarat regions, and established an empire centered at Kannauj, the former capital of Harshavardhana. Raja Man Pratihar ruled Bhinmal in Jalore when Parmara Emperor Vakpati Munja(972-990 CE) invaded the region – after this conquest he divided these conquered territories among his Parmara princes. His son Aranyaraj Parmar was granted the Abu region, and his son Chandan Parmar and nephew Dharnivarah Parmar were given the Jalore region. Raja Man Pratihar's son Dewalsimha Pratihar was a contemporary of Abu's Raja Mahipal Parmar (1000–1014 CE). Raja Devalsimha made unsuccessful attempts to free his country or re-establish Pratihar hold on Bhinmal. He finally settled for the territories to the southwest of Bhinmal, comprising four hills: Dodasa, Nadwana, Kala-Pahad and Sundha. He made Lohiyana (present-day Jaswantpura) his capital. Gradually their jagir included 52 villages in and around modern Jalore district. The Dewal Pratiharas participated in Jalore's Chauhan Kanhaddeo's resistance against Allauddin Khilji. Thakur Dhawalsimha Dewal of Lohiyana supplied manpower to Maharana Pratap and married his daughter to the Maharana, in return Maharana gave him the title of "Rana" which has stayed with them to now.

=== Shrimala ===
Bhinmal was also called Shrimala, which was recorded in the Shramali Purana. The Brahmins and merchants of Bhinmal were called Shrimali Brahmanas and Shrimali Vaniyas respectively. After Vanaraja Chavda established a new capital at Patan, the symbolic centre of these communities shifted to Patan. The main image of Mahalakshmi was moved from Bhinmal to Patan in 1147.

== Creation of the Śrīmali Clan ==
Jain scriptural accounts of Acharya Swayamprabhasuri's life describe his visit to Rajasthan 57 years after Mahavira's nirvana which was in 527 BCE. This would date his visit to Śrīmal in 470 BCE. Most of the non-canonical texts of the Śvetāmbara sect agree upon this account and describe him as one of the first few Jain monks to visit Rajasthan. Following is a brief scriptural account of the establishment of the Śrīmali clan by Swayamprabhasuri.

In Maru Pradesh (modern-day Rajasthan), monks neither of Jainism, nor of Buddhism had preached due to the difficult terrain (desert). Brahmins had a monopoly in this part of India. It is said that practices of Kundapanth and Caliyapanth, branches of Tantric Hinduism, were very popular. It is believed that they promoted several tantric malpractices in the name of religion. It is further stated that Śrīmal (modern-day Bhinmal), a town in Rajasthan, was at the center of such practices.

Once, Swayamprabhasuri was wandering with his disciples near Mount Abu for the first time after visiting Palitana temples. Several merchants from Śrīmal visited Mount Abu for business. Some of them happened to come across Swayamprabhasuri's sermons on non-violence. They insisted upon him to visit Śrīmal to end such malpractices. Later, he visited Śrīmal where preparations for an Ashvamedha Yagya were being made. Several animals were readied for sacrifice. When his disciples went out to beg for food, they returned without any food stating that only meat being cooked at all households they went to and that they could not find food 'free from 42 faults' in the town.

Upon hearing this, Swayamprabhasuri immediately went to King Jayasen's palace where Brahmins were preparing for the animal sacrifice. The king welcomed him and asked about the reason for his visit. Swayamprabhasuri clearly stated the Jain principle of "Ahimsa parmo dharma" (transl. non-violence is the first act of righteousness). Interrupting his sermon, the Brahmin leader for the sacrificial ritual told the king that Jains do not follow the Vedas and must not be heeded to. However, Swayamprabhasuri stayed determined on his point and a lengthy debate followed. Swayamprabhasuri emerged victorious in the debate and King Jayasen, along with 90000 households of the town turned towards non-violence and eventually, Jainism after Swayamprabhasuri preached them about the 12 vows for householders.

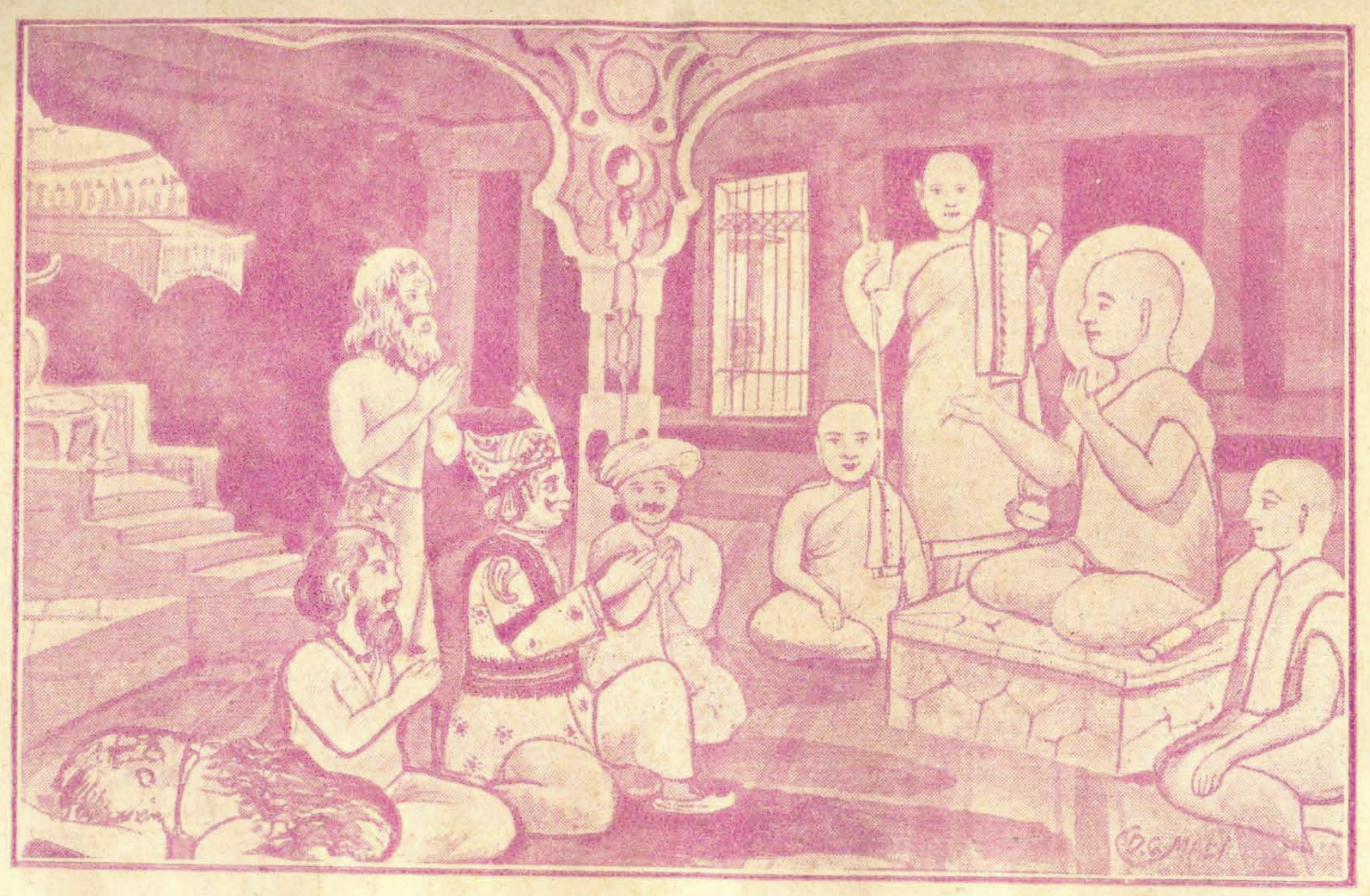
Swayamprabhasuri delivering a sermon in the court of King Jayasena of Srimal

Later on, residents of this large town moved to various parts of Rajasthan and their clan was named Śrīmali after their hometown Śrīmal.

It is believed that Swayamprabhasuri consecrated a temple and an idol of the 1st Tirthankara Rishabhanatha at Śrīmal. A pilgrimage procession to Palitana temples was also organized by the Jain Sangha at Śrīmal. It is further stated that they also renovated Jain temples at Mount Abu.

== Geography ==
Bhinmal is located at 25.0°N 72.25°E.

== Infrastructure ==
=== Education ===
On 23 August 2013 Bhinmal College was upgraded to post-graduate status by the Department of College Education.

== Administrative set-up ==
- Bhinmal has a septate District Transport Office (DTO) including Vehicle Registration Code RJ-46 allotted by Transport Department of Govt of Rajasthan on 19 July 2013.
- Bhinmal constituency elects one member to the Vidhan Sabha (Rajasthan State Assembly)
- Joraram Choudhary is the current district president of the vishva hindu parishad (VHP) for the Bhinmal unit in Jalor district. ----https://dainik.bhaskar.com/FSRvgjn0SXb

== Demography ==
According to the 2011 Census of India, Bhinmal had a population of 302,553, subdivided into a rural population of 254,621 and an urban population was 47,932, Males constituted 50.6% of the population and females 49.4%. Bhinmal had an average literacy rate of 53.6%, lower than the national average of 74%, with male literacy of 70.2% and female literacy of 36.8%. 17% of the population were under six years of age.

== Monuments ==
- Dadeli Baori
- Mahalakshmi Kamaleshvari Temple - Dhora Dhal - Bhinmal
- Shri Parshwa Nath temple - During construction work, a 450-year-old temple structure was unearthed in 2002. The temple possesses five images of Jain Tirthankars made of white marble.

== In popular culture ==
A documentary made on Bhinmal, My Beautiful Village Bhinmal, by Azad Jain, won "Best Documentary-Writing" Award in Rolling Frames Short Film Summit, Bangalore, in 2014. It was also screened at the Ekotop Junior Film Festival; Slovak Republic, Europe; Pink City Short Film Festival, Jaipur; and Wanderlust Film Festival, Jaisalmer. Newspapers from Rajasthan mentioned it as it was the only film in the festival about a Rajasthani village and its people.

== See also ==
- Swayamprabhasuri
- Kshemkari Mata Temple
- Bhandavapur

== Bibliography ==
- Bhandarkar, D. R. (1929), "Indian Studies No. I: Slow Progress of Islam Power in Ancient India", Annals of the Bhandarkar Oriental Research Institute, 10 (1/2): 25–44, JSTOR 41682407
- Blankinship, Khalid Yahya (1994), The End of the Jihad State: The Reign of Hisham Ibn 'Abd al-Malik and the Collapse of the Umayyads, SUNY Press, ISBN 978-0-7914-1827-7, archived from the original on 9 November 2023
- Campbell, James MacNabb; Reginald Edward Enthoven (1901). Gazetteer of the Bombay Presidency. Govt. Central Press, 2. ISBN 81-206-0651-5.
- Cort, John E. (2001), Jains in the World: Religious Values and Ideology in India, Oxford University Press, ISBN 978-0-19-803037-9
- Malabari, Behramji Merwanji; Krishnalal M. Jhaveri (1998). Gujarat and the Gujaratis: Pictures of Men and Manners Taken from Life. Asian Educational Services, ISBN 81-206-0651-5.
- Puri, Baij Nath (1986). The History of the Gurjara-Pratiharas. Delhi: Munshiram Manoharlal.
- Rajasthan (India) (1973). Rajasthan [district Gazetteers].: Jalore. Gazetteer of India. Printed at Government Central Press. Archived from the original on 9 November 2023.
- Romila Thapar (2005). Somanatha: The Many Voices of a History. Verso. ISBN 978-1-84467-020-8. Archived from the original on 9 November 2023.
- Sharma, Sanjay (2006), "Negotiating Identity and Status Legitimation and Patronage under the Gurjara-Pratīhāras of Kanauj", Studies in History, 22 (22): 181–220, doi:10.1177/025764300602200202, S2CID 144128358
- Sharma, Shanta Rani (2012), "Exploding the Myth of the Gūjara Identity of the Imperial Pratihāras", Indian Historical Review, 39 (1): 1–10, doi:10.1177/0376983612449525, S2CID 145175448
- Sircar, D.C. (1990), Studies in the Geography of Ancient and Medieval India, Motilal Banarsidass, ISBN 978-81-208-0690-0
- Wink, André (2002) [first published 1990], Al-Hind: The Making of the Indo-Islamic World (Third ed.), Brill, ISBN 0391041738
