= Animal sacrifice in Hinduism =

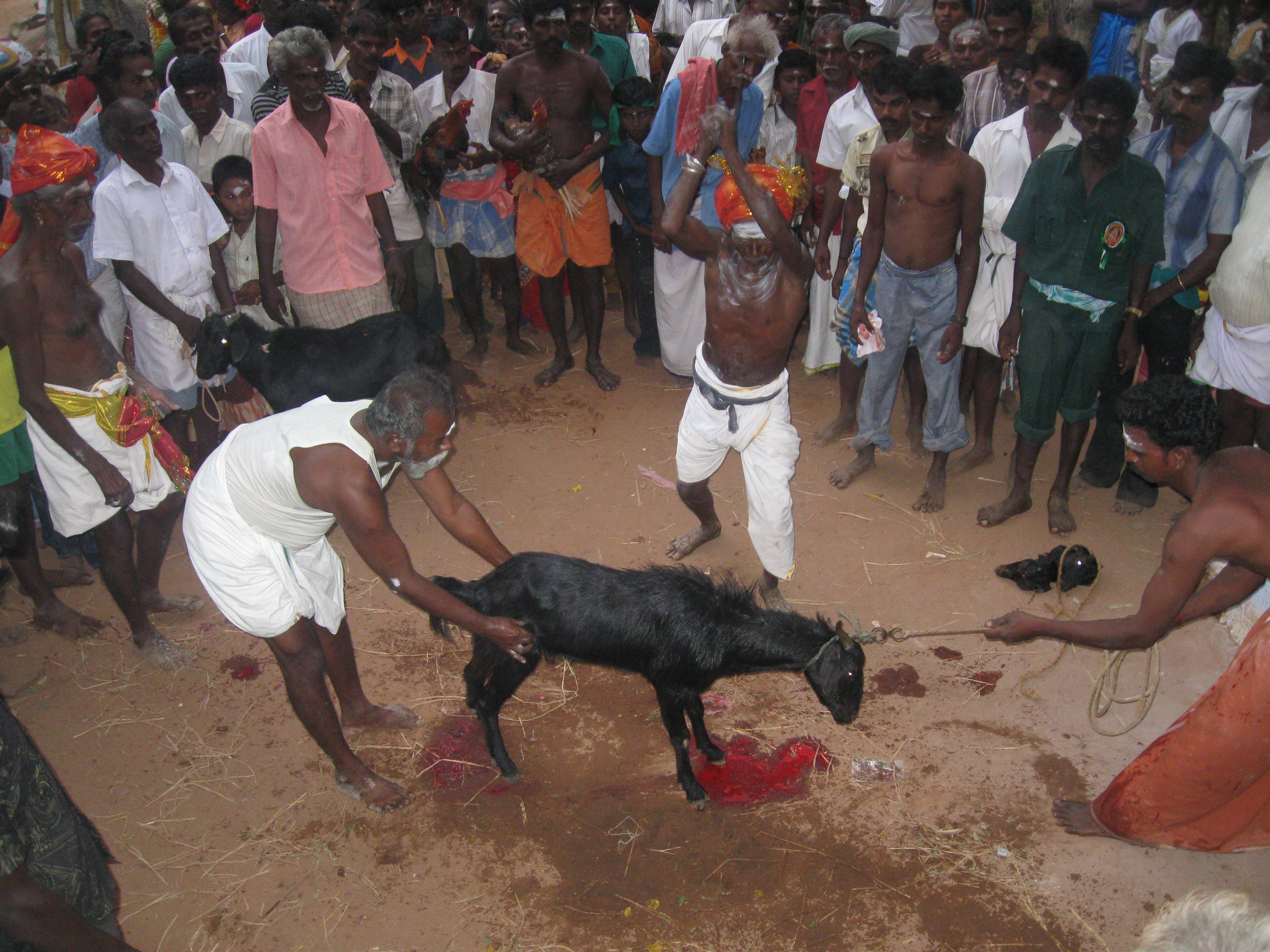
A goat being sacrificed in a Temple festival in Tamil Nadu.

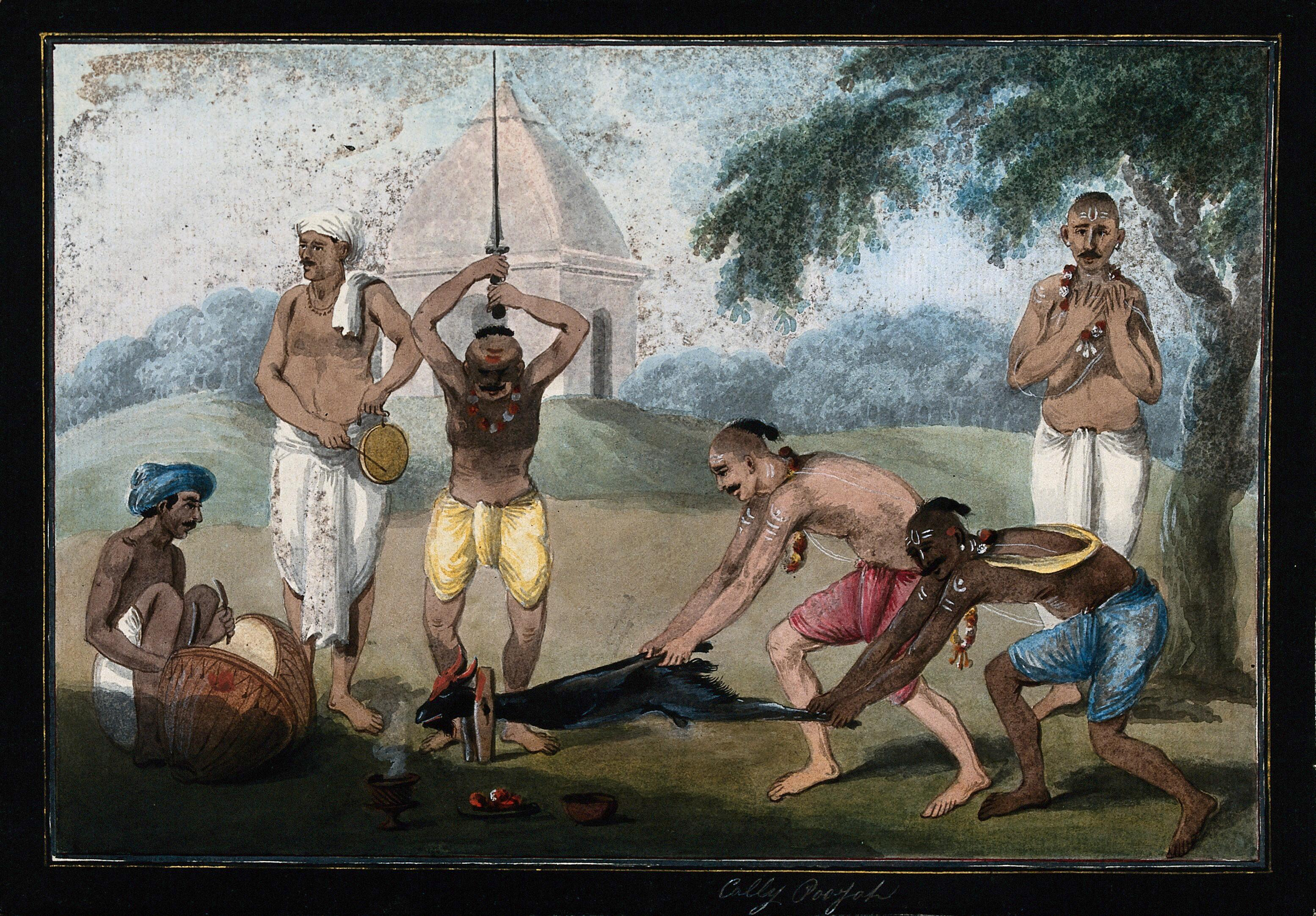
A goat being slaughtered at Kali Puja, painting by an Indian artist. Dated between 1800 and 1899. Inscription on verso: "A Hindoo sacrifice"

The practice of animal sacrifice in Hinduism in recent times are mostly associated with Shaktism, and in currents of folk Hinduism strongly rooted in local popular or tribal traditions. Animal sacrifices were an important part of the ancient Vedic Era in India, and are mentioned in the Vedas as Yajna. Over the period, the shape of rituals and sacrifice changed with the shifting of the pastoral economy of the Early-vedic period to an agricultural economy of the Later-vedic. This shift in economy also impacted the rituals and sacrifice, replacing animal sacrifice with grains (rice, wheat, etc.) in Srauta Yajnas. During the Medieval period, religious movements like the Bhakti movement also had a great impact on this tradition, as is evident in Hindu scripture like the Brahma Vaivarta Purana, which forbids the Srauta Asvamedha Horse sacrifice in Kali Yuga. The perception that animal sacrifice was only practiced in the ancient Non-Vedic Era is opposed by instances like Srauta Ashvamedha and other rituals that are rooted in the Vedas. Both the Itihasas and the Puranas like the Devi Bhagavata Purana and the Kalika Purana as well as the Saiva and Sakta Agamas prescribe animal sacrifices.

== Terminology ==
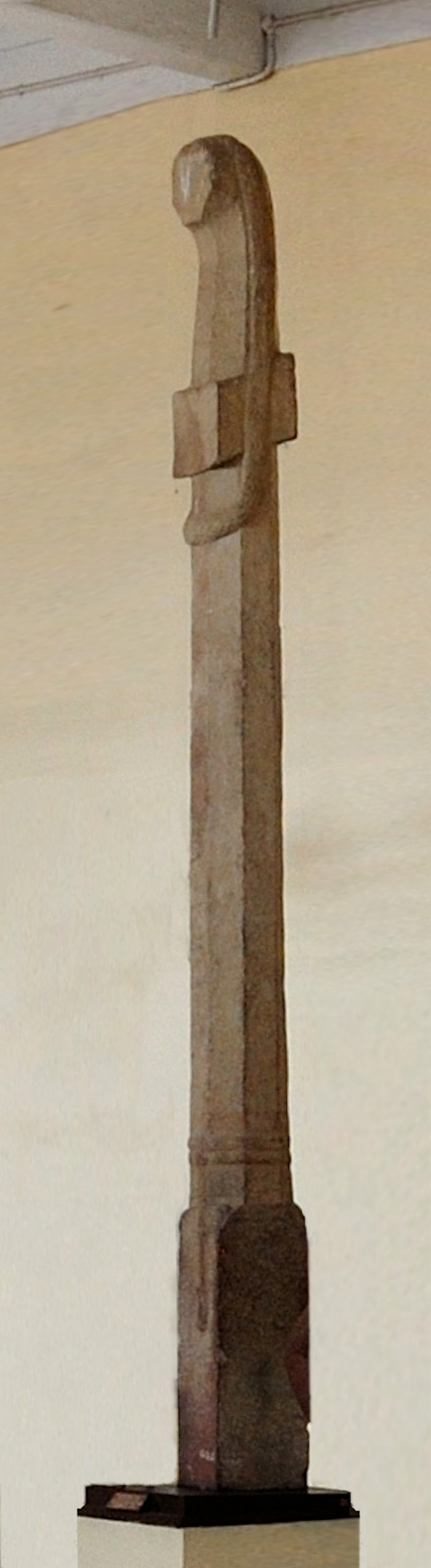
Yupa sacrificial pillar of the time of Vasishka, Isapur, near Mathura. Mathura Museum.

A Sanskrit term used for animal sacrifice is bali, in origin meaning "tribute, offering or oblation" generically ("vegetable oblations [... and] animal oblations,"). Bali among other things "refers to the blood of an animal" and is sometimes known as Jhatka Bali among Hindus.

The Kalika Purana distinguishes bali (sacrifice), mahabali (great sacrifice), for the ritual killing of goats, elephant, respectively, though the reference to humans in Shakti theology is symbolic and done in effigy in modern times. For instance, Sir John Woodroffe published a commentary on the Karpuradistotram, where he writes that the sacrificial animals listed in verse 19 are symbols for the six enemies, with "man" representing pride.

== Hindu scriptures ==
Acharya Hemchandra, a Jain sage, cited passages from Manusmriti, one of the law book of Hindus, to demonstrate how, in light of false scriptures, Hindus have resorted to violence, and criticized Hindu animal sacrifice. Akalanka, another Jain monk, sarcastically said that if killing can result in enlightenment, one should become a hunter or fisherman. The Brahmanic texts explicitly state that five creatures were suitable for sacrifice in Vedic India, in descending order: man, horse, cattle, sheep, and goat. The text of the Rigveda and other Vedas provide detailed description of sacrifices including cattle sacrifice.

The Ashvamedha, a ritual in which a horse was allowed to roam freely for a year, then finally sacrificed, is mentioned in the Vedic texts such as the Yajurveda. In the epic Mahabharata, Yudhishtra performs the Ashwamedha after winning the Kurukshetra War to become the Chakravartin emperor. The Mahabharata also contains a description of an Ashvamedha performed by the Chedi king Uparichara Vasu. In the Shanti Parva of the Mahabharata, King Vasu is granted a divine vision not because he had become spiritually enlightened, but because God was pleased that his Ashvamedha involved no animal slaughter.

The rulers of the Gupta Empire, the Chalukya dynasty, and the Chola dynasty all performed the Ashvamedha.

Agnisomiya was the simplest of all Soma sacrifices in which animal sacrifice played an important part; it required that a goat be sacrificed to Agni and Soma preceding the day of offering of nectar to the gods. In the Savaniya sacrifice, victims were offered throughout the day of offering to Agni. These rituals didn't focus on the killing of the animal but as a symbol to the powers it was sacrificed.

In Bhagavata Purana written in 6th to 8th century CE, Krishna tells people not to perform Srauta animal sacrifices in the Kali Yuga, the present age. The Brahma Vaivarta Purana describes Srauta animal sacrifices as kali-varjya or prohibited in the Kali Yuga. The Adi Purana, Brihan-naradiya Purana and Aditya Purana also forbid Srauta animal sacrifice in Kali Yuga. The Padma Purana encourages respect for all living beings. Some orthodox interpreters of Hindu scriptures, such as Sri Chandrasekharendra Saraswathi, believed that the prohibition in Kali Yuga applies only to a few types of animal sacrifices, notably cow and horse sacrifices. Such interpretations justify Vedic animal sacrifice viewing it "as a little hurt caused in the cause of a great ideal" and believing that "the animal sacrificed attains an elevated state".

== Animal sacrifice in contemporary Hindu society ==
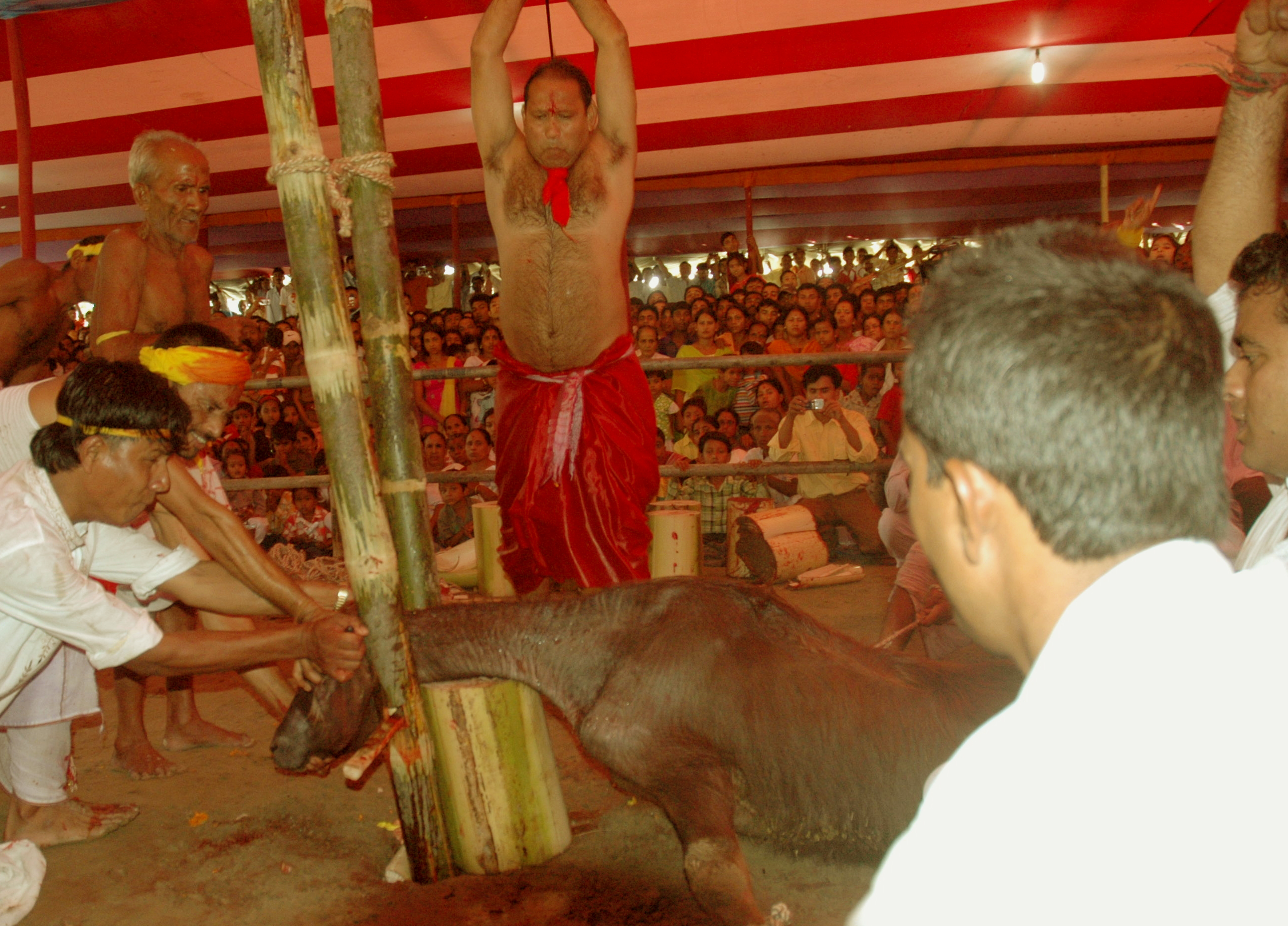
A male buffalo calf about to be sacrificed by a priest in the Durga Puja festival. The buffalo sacrifice practice, however, is rare in contemporary India.

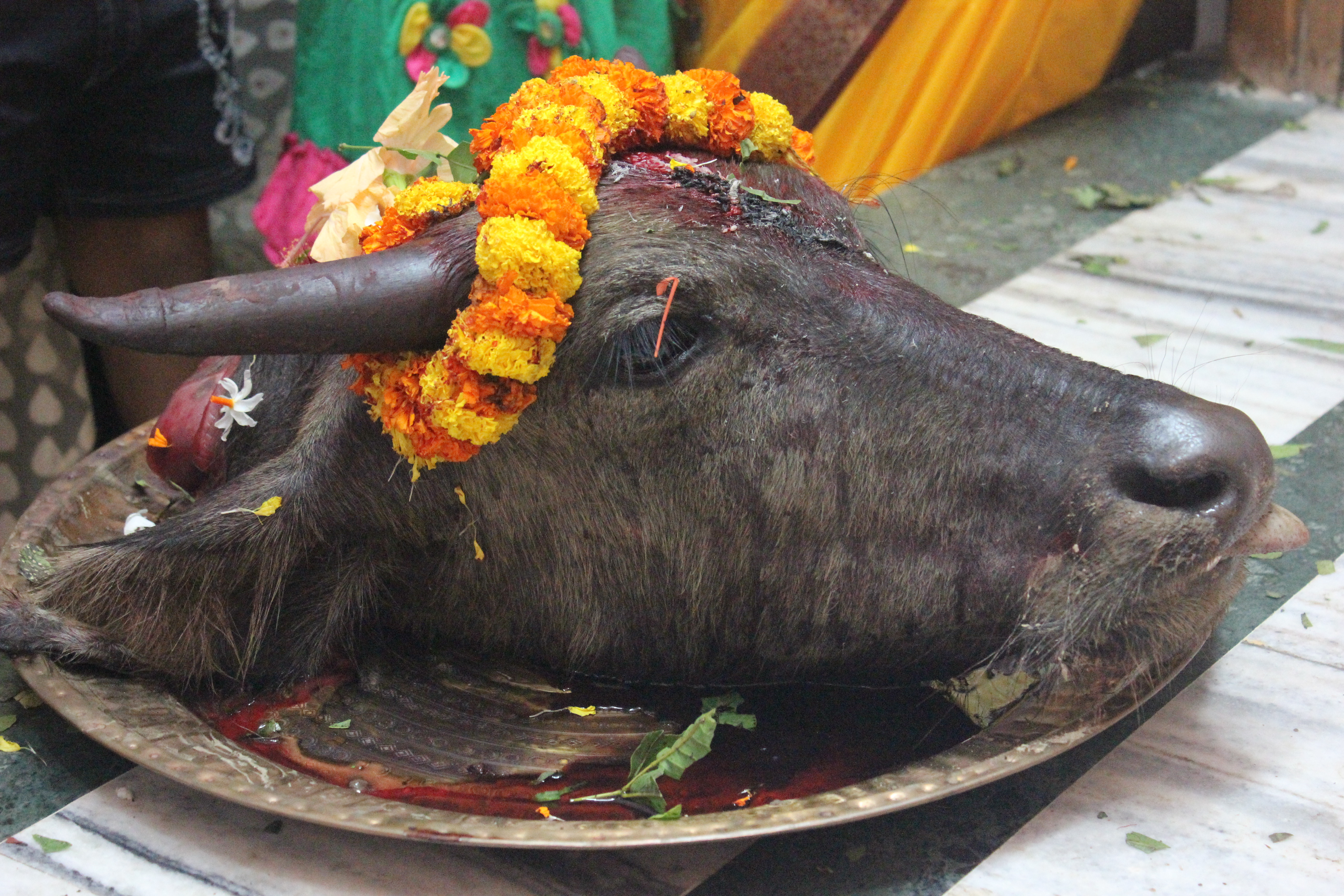
The sacrificed buffalo's head kept in a large brass utensil

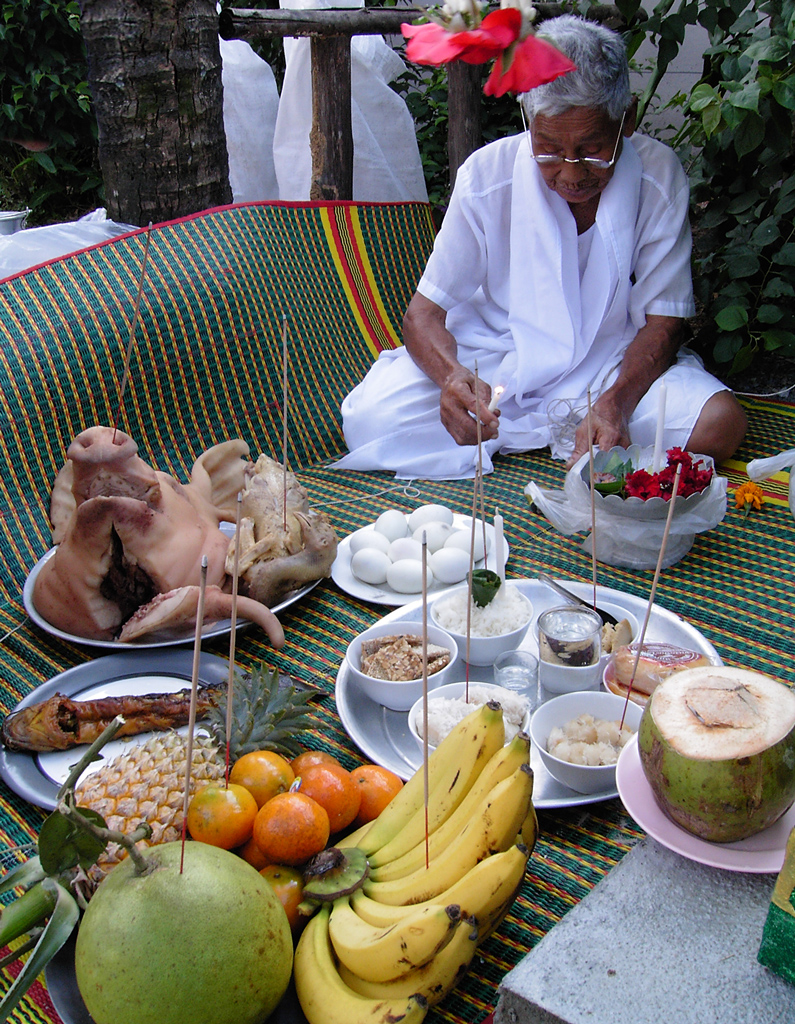
A sacrificed boar, cooked mutton, chicken and eggs being offered in a spirit house consecration by a Thai Brahmin.

While some modern Hindus avoid animal sacrifice, there are numerous exceptions throughout India. In general, where animal sacrifice is practiced, it will be seen as desired by some deities, but not by others.

Though Hindu food offerings are generally vegetarian, offering of sacrificed animals is prevalent and remains "important ritual in popular Hinduism". Animal sacrifice is practiced in the states of Assam, Odisha, Jharkhand, West Bengal and Tripura in Eastern India, as well as in the nation of Nepal. The sacrifice involves slaying of goats, chickens, pigeons and male Water buffaloes. For example, one of the largest animal sacrifice in Nepal occurs over the three-day-long Gadhimai festival. In 2009 it was speculated that more than 250,000 animals were killed while 5 million devotees attended the festival. The Gadhimai festival was banned by the Nepal government in 2015.

Animal sacrifice is offered to fierce forms of Hindu deities such as Durga, and Kali; village goddesses like Shitala, Mariamman; Bhairava (Shiva's uninhibited form); Narasimha (Vishnu's ferocious avatar) and malevolent spirits. The purpose of the sacrifice is to pacify the anger of these wrathful deities and seek their grace.

In the state of Odisha, every year, animals like goat and fowl are sacrificed before Kandhen Budhi, the reigning deity of Kantamal in Boudh district, on the occasion of her annual Yatra/Jatra (festival) held in the month of Aswina (September–October). The main attraction of Kandhen Budhi Yatra is Ghusuri Puja. Ghusuri means a child pig, which is sacrificed to the goddess every three years. During the Bali Jatra, male goats are offered as a sacrifice to the goddess Samaleswari in her temple in Sambalpur, Odisha. Bali Jatra of Sonepur in Odisha, India is also an annual festival celebrated in the month of Aswina (September–October) when animal sacrifice is an integral part of the ritual worship of deities namely Samaleswari, Sureswari and Khambeswari. Bali refers to animal sacrifice and hence this annual festival is called Bali Jatra.

Animal sacrifice is a part of some Durga puja celebrations during the Navratri in the eastern states of India. The goddess is offered sacrificial animal in this ritual in the belief that it stimulates her violent vengeance against the buffalo demon. According to Christopher Fuller, the animal sacrifice practice is rare among Hindus during Navratri, or at other times, outside the Shaktism tradition found in the eastern Indian states of West Bengal, Odisha and Northeastern India, Assam and Tripura. Further, even in these states, the festival season is one where significant animal sacrifices are observed. In some Shakta Hindu communities, the slaying of buffalo demon and victory of Durga is observed with a symbolic sacrifice instead of animal sacrifice. (Note: In these cases, Shaktism devotees consider animal sacrifice distasteful, practice alternate means of expressing devotion while respecting the views of others in their tradition. A statue of asura demon made of flour, or equivalent, is immolated and smeared with vermilion to remember the blood that had necessarily been spilled during the war. Other substitutes include a vegetal or sweet dish considered equivalent to the animal.)

The Rajputs worship their weapons and horses on Navratri, and formerly offered a sacrifice of goat or male water buffalo to a goddess revered as Kuldevi – a practice that continues in some places. The ritual requires slaying of the animal with a single stroke. In the past this ritual was considered a rite of passage into manhood and readiness as a warrior. The Kuldevi among these Rajput communities is a warrior-pativrata guardian goddess, with local legends tracing reverence for her during Rajput–Muslim wars.

The tradition of animal sacrifice is not prevalent in temples and households around Banaras where vegetarian offerings are made to the Goddess.

Animal sacrifice is practiced by Shaktism tradition where ritual offering is made to a Devi. In Southern Indian states of Karnataka, Andhra Pradesh, and Tamil Nadu, it is most notably performed in front of local deities or clan deities. In Karnataka, the goddess receiving the sacrifice tends to be Renuka. The animal is either a male buffalo or a goat.

In some sacred groves of India, particularly in Western Maharashtra, animal sacrifice is practiced to pacify female deities that are supposed to rule the groves. Animal sacrifice is also practiced by some rural communities around Pune to placate deities at temples of Waghjai and Sirkai. In the region around Pune, goats and fowl are sacrificed to the God Vetala. The Kathar or Kutadi community of Maharashtra, while observing the Pachvi ceremony after delivery of a child in the family, offer worship to their family deity, Saptashrungi and also offer a sacrifice of a goat. Following this they hold the naming ceremony of the child on the 12th day. Goats and chicken are sacrificed at the temple of Ekvira adjacent to the Karla caves in Pune district. In Maharashtra, Prasad offerings to Goddess Bhaväni at Tuljapur sacrificial offering of goat meat.

There is a general misconception that Vaishnava sect dedicated to the god Vishnu, which the majority of Hindus follow, prohibits animal sacrifice. This is incorrect because Vaishnava Acharyas like Ramanuja, Madhva, Vallabhacharya, Nimbarka, etc. have accepted vedic animal sacrifices in the Bhashyas. Sattada srivaishnavas, a subsect of Tenkalai srivaishnavas have a history of consumption of liquor and meat on festive occasions in line with grihyasutras and smritis

Ahobilam in Andhra Pradesh, is the centre of worship of Narasimha, the lion-headed avatar of Vishnu, to whom the nine Hindu temples and other shrines are all dedicated.  A certain amount of sacrifice of goats and rams is still performed weekly. This is now highly unusual in the worship of Vishnu,[60][61] suggesting a "transitional state between a wild and unregulated tribal deity and an orthodox form of the god Vishnu".[60]

In the Kallalagar temple of Vishnu in the state of Tamil nadu, animals are presented to a closed door that acts as a shrine of the guardian deity Karuppan and then ritually sacrificed outside the temple. Many "low-caste" devotees believe that sacrifice is to the presiding form of Vishnu, rather than Karuppan. Karuppan, as the guardian deity of the Tamil village god Aiyanar, is offered animal sacrifice, while the main deity is covered with a curtain, to avoid the sight of the sacrifice. Tamil village goddesses like Mariamman are said to enjoy animal sacrifice. Karuppan or another guardian deity receives animal sacrifice on her behalf; however animal sacrifice is offered directly to the goddess in festivals, generally outside the temple premises.

A popular Hindu ritual form of worship of North Malabar region in the Indian state of Kerala is the blood offering to Theyyam gods. Theyyam deities are propitiated through the cock sacrifice where the religious cockfight is a religious exercise of offering blood to the Theyyam gods.

Shaktism or mother goddess worship nearly always requires Panchamakara worship as does that of Bhutas, or the local deities which were the primordial inhabitants of any given place. This practice exists throughout Greater India, even where Hinduism has declined as Burmese Nat (deity) worship, Indochinese Spirit house worship and the Philippine Diwata anito worship. The Shaiva Agamas refer to the Shakta Agamas and Kaula (Hinduism) tantras such as Yamala and Matrutantras when dealing with Panchamakara rituals. Kulamarga is also known by the name 'Bhuta tantra'.

Animal sacrifice was outlawed in the state of Tamil Nadu in 1951 and revoked in 2004 while still stands outlawed in Gujarat from 1971. Formerly buffalo sacrifice was practiced by Rajput rulers, but the practice has since ceased, and the offerings to mother goddesses have become vegetarian.

Animal Sacrifice is practiced by some Hindus on the Indonesian island of Bali. The religious belief of Tabuh Rah, a form of animal sacrifice of Balinese Hinduism includes a religious cockfight where a rooster is used in religious custom by allowing him to fight against another rooster in a religious and spiritual cockfight, a spiritual appeasement exercise of Tabuh Rah. The spilling of blood is necessary as purification to appease the evil spirits, and ritual fights follow an ancient and complex ritual as set out in the sacred lontar manuscripts.

== See also ==
- Cattle slaughter in India
- Criticism of Hinduism
